= HSEEP =

Document published by the United States Department of Homeland Security

The Homeland Security Exercise and Evaluation Program (HSEEP) was developed by the United States Department of Homeland Security as a disaster-preparedness resource. The program's guiding documents contain a set of standard principles for all levels of training programs, as well as a common approach to exercise program management, design and development, conduct, evaluation, and improvement planning.

== History and justification ==
In 2002, the National Strategy for Homeland Security motivated Homeland Security Presidential Directives (HSPD) 5, 7, and 8, which then provided these national initiatives. HSEEP focuses on development of training sessions for all levels of community stakeholders, and relies upon capabilities-based planning, National Response Plan (NRP), National Incident Management System (NIMS), the Universal Task List (UTL) and the Target Capabilities List (TCL) as established by the U.S. Federal Government.

== Training and Readiness ==
Preparedness trainings play a vital role in national disaster mitigation. This document permits individual communities, via their leaders and stakeholders, to create standard programs which meet an agreed-upon standard, validate their community's plans and capabilities, and identify areas for improvement. Utilizing the same format and structure during nationwide disaster preparation helps to minimize confusion during emergency situations and maximize understanding and communication across different organizations.

These exercises should ideally test a community's capabilities, familiarize local personnel with roles and responsibilities, and foster meaningful interaction and communication between federal, state, and local organizations. These lessons and drills should ideally bring together and strengthen the whole community in ongoing efforts to prevent, protect against, mitigate, respond to, and recover from all hazards.
