= Ohio Military Reserve =

State paramilitary organization

- Emblem of the Ohio Military Reserve
- Active: 1985–present
- Country: United States
- Allegiance: Ohio
- Type: State Defense Force
- Size: 744
- Part of: State Defense Forces of Ohio
- Headquarters: Haubrich Armory, Columbus, Ohio
- Website: ohiomilitaryreserve.com

Commanders
- Commander-In-Chief: Governor Mike DeWine
- Adjutant General: Brigadier General Matthew S. Woodruff, ARNG
- Commander, State Defense Forces of Ohio: Brigadier General (OH) Larry M. Pinkerton, Jr.
- Commander, 4th Civil Support and Sustainment Brigade: Colonel (OH) Gary D. Lehman

The Ohio Military Reserve (OHMR) is one of three separate components that make up the Ohio State Defense Force (SDF). Like other SDF's the Ohio Military Reserve functions as a reserve to the Ohio National Guard.

State Defense Forces are not eligible for federal funding and must request their assets from the state. The OHMR had an organizational budget of $77,491 for Ohio Fiscal Year 2025. Personnel are unpaid for their drill weekends and training. They must also provide their own uniforms and equipment.

The OHMR serves under the Adjutant General and is headquartered at the Haubrich Armory in Columbus, Ohio.

As of 2023, the OHMR operates as a brigade level entity. Its sole brigade is the 4th Civil Support and Sustainment Brigade. For Ohio Fiscal Year 2025, the OHMR had a total authorized strength of 744 soldiers, of which 160 were filled.

The OHMR has a "sister service", the Ohio Naval Militia which operates out of Camp Perry, located near Port Clinton, Ohio.

== History ==
=== 20th century ===
During World War I, 120 companies of Home Guard were organized across the cities and towns of Ohio to replace the Ohio National Guard, which was sent overseas. Organized at a local level, members were classified as policemen or deputy sheriffs by local authorities. In 1918, the Governor of Ohio recognized the units officially, reclassifying them as the Ohio Home Guard under authority of the governor, so that they could receive rifles and other equipment from the federal government.

The Ohio Home Guard was reactivated during World War II under the name "Ohio State Guard." The Ohio State Guard reached a strength of over 4,000 by June 1944. Among other responsibilities, the Ohio State Guard staffed a mobile gas warfare demonstration school which instructed more than 25,000 civil defense workers in addition to its own units.

Ohio maintained its state defense through the Cold War as well. The Ohio Defense Corps was established in May 1949; a minimum cadre for five regiments was recruited within a month.

=== Reorganization ===
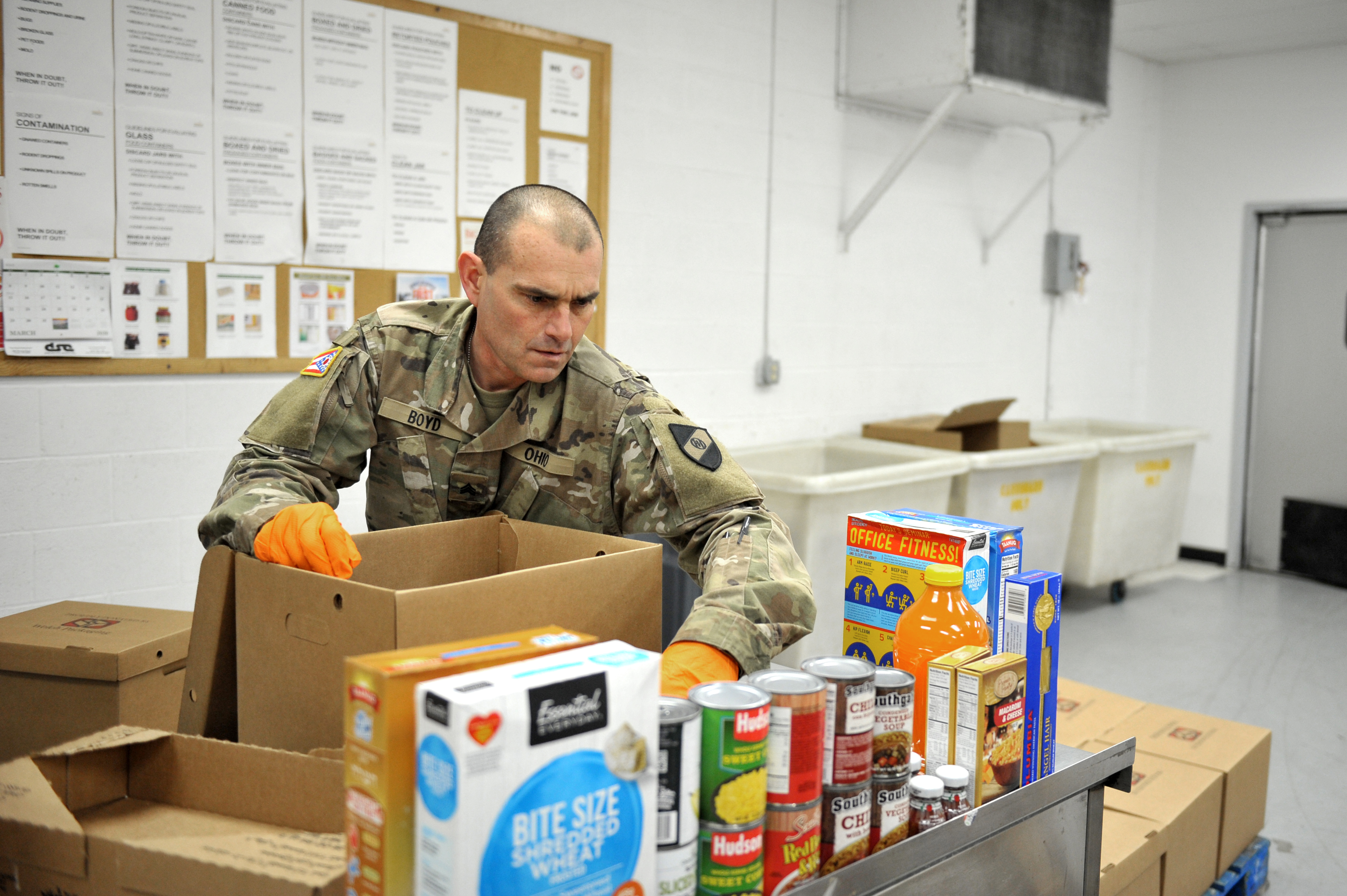
Sgt. Terry Boyd, assigned to the Ohio Military Reserve's Bravo Company 1st Battalion, packages meal boxes at the Toledo Northwestern Ohio Food Bank.

In 2009, the OHMR underwent a reorganization which changed its mission to emergency management. The OHMR began a transformation process that took it from its former mission as a cadre state defense force held in reserve to its current mission as an active force. The current mission focuses on FEMA Emergency Support Functions (ESF) 6 and 7. This includes aiding in operating mass care facilities (ESF 6) and warehouses, distribution centers, and support facilities (ESF 7).

The transformation took part in three phases. The first phase was integration, which ended in September 2010. In the second phase, the OHMR became initially operational capable during the Fiscal Year 2011, and the third resulted in the OHMR becoming fully operational capable in Fiscal Year 2012.

=== Modern era ===
On 25 October 2019, Governor Mike DeWine signed into law a bill which created a volunteer Ohio Cyber Reserve (OhCR) made up of trained civilians and organized as a part of the Ohio Military Reserve. The stated purpose of the unit is to be available for the governor to assist eligible municipalities with cybersecurity vulnerabilities and provide recommendations to reduce cyber threats. The first teams are expected to be created by the end of January 2020.

Beginning in March 2020, members of the Ohio Military Reserve were activated as a part of Operation Steady Resolve, as part of Ohio's response to the COVID-19 pandemic. The initial mission was to assist twelve food banks across Ohio with packaging, transporting and distributing food and other essential items to vulnerable populations across Ohio. In Columbus, the National Guard and Military Reserve packed boxes and served meals to men staying at the Downtown YMCA, including those who have been relocated from homeless shelters.

== Personnel and training ==
Enlistment is voluntary, however all soldiers swear an oath of enlistment or appointment. Officers hold state, not federal, commissions. Units are co-located in state-owned readiness centers (armories) with National Guard units across the state. Most units drill one weekend a month and all troops must attend one week of training annually (annual training, or AT). In the past, troops trained with pistols and shotguns, however, the cost of maintenance and annual re-certification has caused this training to be dropped. Although they are covered by the State's insurance and workers’ compensation program, soldiers are not paid for their training time or AT period. However, if mobilized, they would be compensated. §5903.02 of the Ohio Revised Code provides OHMR personnel protection under the Uniformed Services Employment and Reemployment Act (USERRA) which addresses military leave from employment for both training and deployment.

In 2010, as part of its shift to an emergency management mission, the OHMR sponsored training on National Incident Management System (NIMS) compliance and Community Emergency Response Teams (CERT) for all soldiers in the OHMR.

The OHMR maintains a military training academy to conduct state versions of standard Army professional development courses such as Basic Entry Level Training (required for all non-prior service personnel), Primary Leadership Development Course, Basic Non-commissioned Officer Course, and the Basic Officer Course. In addition, the OHMR Academy offers a series of Army Institute for Professional Development (AIPD) correspondence courses.

OHMR members can earn the Military Emergency Management Specialist Badge from the State Guard Association of the United States, The badge includes Basic, Senior and Master level qualifications.

== Uniform ==
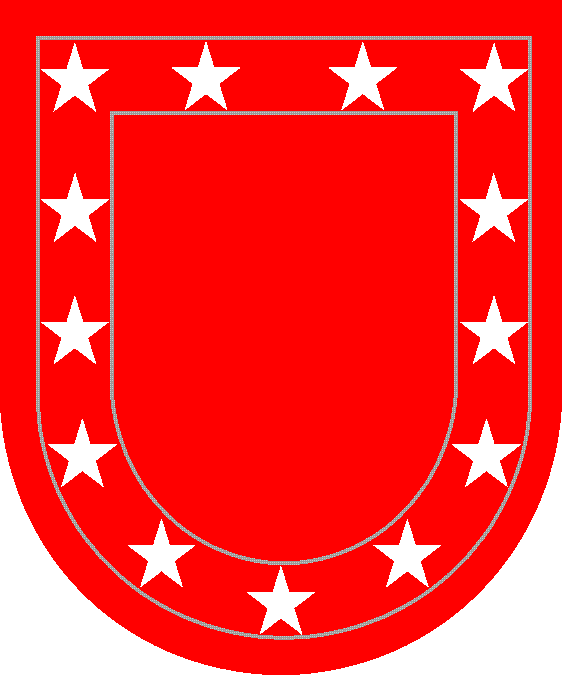
State Defense Force Beret Flash

The current uniform of OHMR is the OCP (Operational Camouflage Pattern) with tan name tags, the Ohio flag patch on the right arm and OHMR unit patch on the left arm. The members of OHMR are authorized to wear the Army Service Uniform (ASU), with the exception of a red, rather than black, nameplate, OHMR or Ohio buttons, and SDF specific insignia. The OHMR wears the service cap (with modified insignia) with the ASU as well as the black beret with the red "State Defense Force" Beret Flash worn by some other states.

== Legal protection ==
Under Ohio law, members of the Ohio Military Reserve are guaranteed the same employment rights and protections as federal reservists enjoy under the Uniformed Services Employment and Reemployment Rights Act (USERRA). Among other legal rights guaranteed under this provision, OHMR members are protected from discrimination based on their membership in the OHMR both during the hiring process and after becoming employed; they are also guaranteed a leave of absence from their places of employment whenever they are activated for training or to take part in an emergency, and their employers are required to reinstate these employees to their previous positions when they return from deployment.

Members of the OHMR, being a part of the Ohio Organized Militia are treated as law enforcement officers and are immune from arrest during state active duty deployment except in case of treason or felony when aiding the civil authorities after being called upon by the Governor with executing the laws of the state, suppressing insurrection, repelling invasion, or promoting the health, safety, and welfare of the citizens of this state. Arrest powers are limited in scope in that the arrest must be made with the immediate intent to deliver the person in custody to civil authorities.

== Awards and decorations ==
The OHMR issues multiple awards and decorations to its members, and allows members to wear OHMR-approved ribbons from the State Guard Association of the United States. Members are also permitted to be awarded certain State of Ohio, Ohio National Guard awards when approved by the Adjutant General of the State of Ohio.

- OHMR Medal of Valor
- OHMR Distinguished Service Medal
- OHMR Medal of Merit
- OHMR Purple Cross Medal
- OHMR Lifesaving Medal
- OHMR Commendation Award
- OHMR Achievement Award
- OHMR Search and Rescue Award
- OHMR Community Service Award
- OHMR Aid to Civil Authority Award
- OHMR Good Conduct Award
- OHMR Longevity Service Award
- OHMR Soldier of the Year Award
- OHMR Honor Graduate Award
- OHMR Officer Training Graduate Award
- OHMR NCO Training Graduate Award
- OHMR Basic Entry Level Training Graduate Award
- OHMR Physical Fitness Award
- OHMR Federal Service School Award
- OHMR Military Indoctrination Award
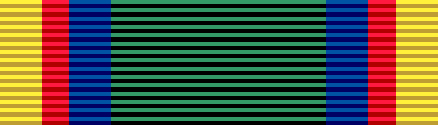
- OHMR Emergency Service Training Award
- OHMR Volunteer Service Award
- OHMR Military Award Readiness
- OHMR Recruiting Achievement Award
- OHMR Military Proficiency Award
- State Guard Association of the United States Membership Ribbon
- State Guard Association of Ohio Member Ribbon
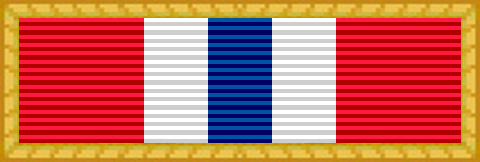
- OHMR Outstanding Unit Citation Award
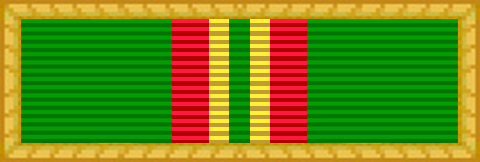
- OHMR Commanding General's Meritorious Unit Service Award

== See also ==
- Ohio Wing Civil Air Patrol
- United States Coast Guard Auxiliary
