= Federal Response =

Federal Response is a generic terms for a government response, usually to disaster. It is usually applies to the United States, which has a federal system of government. It can refer to:

== In the United States Government ==
- National Response Plan, also known as the Federal Response Plan
- National Response Framework, which replaced the National Response Plan
- Specific disasters:
  - Rescue and recovery effort after the September 11 attacks on the World Trade Center, 2001
  - Criticism of the government response to Hurricane Katrina, 2005

== Other uses ==
- Federal Response (Jericho episode), an episode of the TV series Jericho
