= Bottom-up and top-down approaches =

Strategies for composition and decomposition

Illustration of bottom-up and top-down approaches to the heap sort

Bottom-up and top-down are strategies of composition and decomposition in fields as diverse as information processing and ordering knowledge, software, humanistic and scientific theories (see systemics), time management, and organization. In practice they can be seen as a style of thinking, teaching or leadership.

A top-down approach (also known as stepwise design and stepwise refinement and in some cases used as a synonym of decomposition) is essentially the breaking down of a system to gain insight into its compositional subsystems in a reverse engineering fashion. In a top-down approach an overview of the system is formulated, specifying but not detailing, any first-level subsystems. Each subsystem is then refined in yet greater detail, sometimes in many additional subsystem levels until the entire specification is reduced to base elements. A top-down model is often specified with the assistance of black boxes, which makes it easier to manipulate. However, black boxes may fail to clarify elementary mechanisms or be detailed enough to realistically validate the model. A top-down approach starts with the big picture, then breaks down into smaller segments.

A bottom-up approach is the piecing together of systems to give rise to more complex systems, thus making the original systems subsystems of the emergent system. Bottom-up processing is a type of information processing based on incoming data from the environment to form a perception. From a cognitive psychology perspective, information enters the eyes in one direction (sensory input, or the "bottom") and is then turned into an image by the brain that can be interpreted and recognized as a perception (output that is "built up" from processing to final cognition). In a bottom-up approach the individual base elements of the system are first specified in great detail. These elements are then linked together to form larger subsystems, which then in turn are linked, sometimes in many levels until a complete top-level system is formed. This strategy often resembles a "seed" model by which the beginnings are small but eventually grow in complexity and completeness. But "organic strategies" may result in a tangle of elements and subsystems, developed in isolation and subject to local optimization as opposed to meeting a global purpose.

== Computer science ==
=== Software development ===
In the software development process, the top-down and bottom-up approaches play a key role.

Top-down approaches emphasize planning and a complete understanding of the system. It is inherent that no coding can begin until a sufficient level of detail has been reached in the design of at least some part of the system. Top-down approaches are implemented by attaching the stubs in place of the module. But these delay testing of the ultimate functional units of a system until significant design is complete.

Bottom-up emphasizes coding and early testing, which can begin as soon as the first module has been specified. But this approach runs the risk that modules may be coded without having a clear idea of how they link to other parts of the system, and that such linking may not be as easy as first thought. Re-usability of code is one of the main benefits of a bottom-up approach.

Top-down design was promoted in the 1970s by IBM researchers Harlan Mills and Niklaus Wirth. Mills developed structured programming concepts for practical use and tested them in a 1969 project to automate the New York Times morgue index. The engineering and management success of this project led to the spread of the top-down approach through IBM and the rest of the computer industry. Among other achievements, Niklaus Wirth, the developer of Pascal programming language, wrote the influential paper Program Development by Stepwise Refinement. Since Niklaus Wirth went on to develop languages such as Modula and Oberon (where one could define a module before knowing about the entire program specification), one can infer that top-down programming was not strictly what he promoted. Top-down methods were favored in software engineering until the late 1980s, and object-oriented programming assisted in demonstrating the idea that both aspects of top-down and bottom-up programming could be used.

Modern software design approaches usually combine top-down and bottom-up approaches. Although an understanding of the complete system is usually considered necessary for good design—leading theoretically to a top-down approach—most software projects attempt to make use of existing code to some degree. Pre-existing modules give designs a bottom-up flavor.

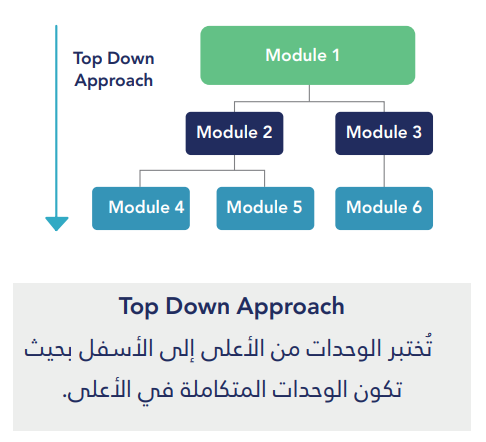
Top-down approach to integration testing

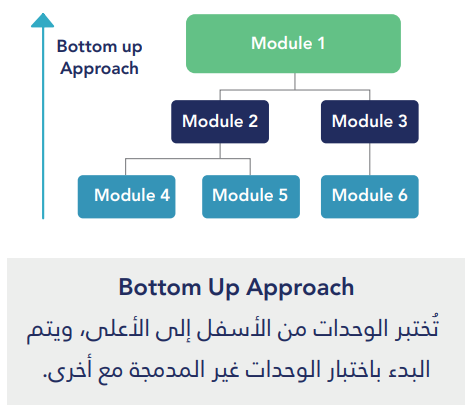
Bottom-up approach

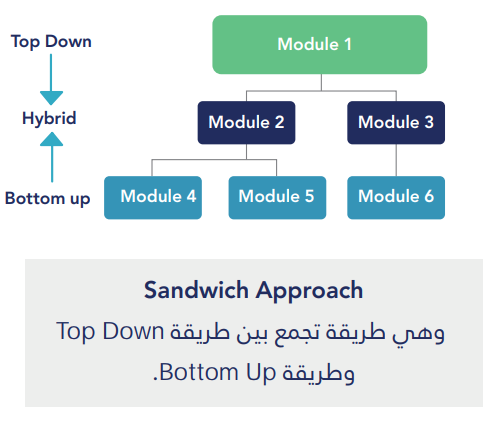
Sandwich approach

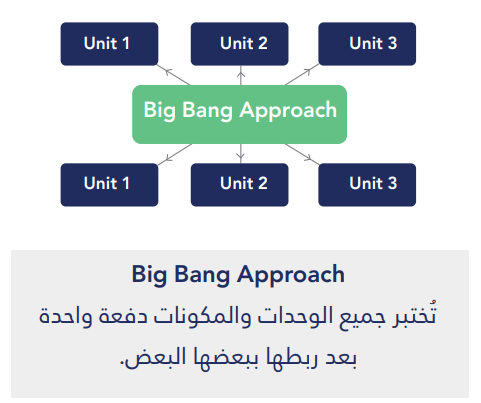
Big bang approach

=== Programming ===
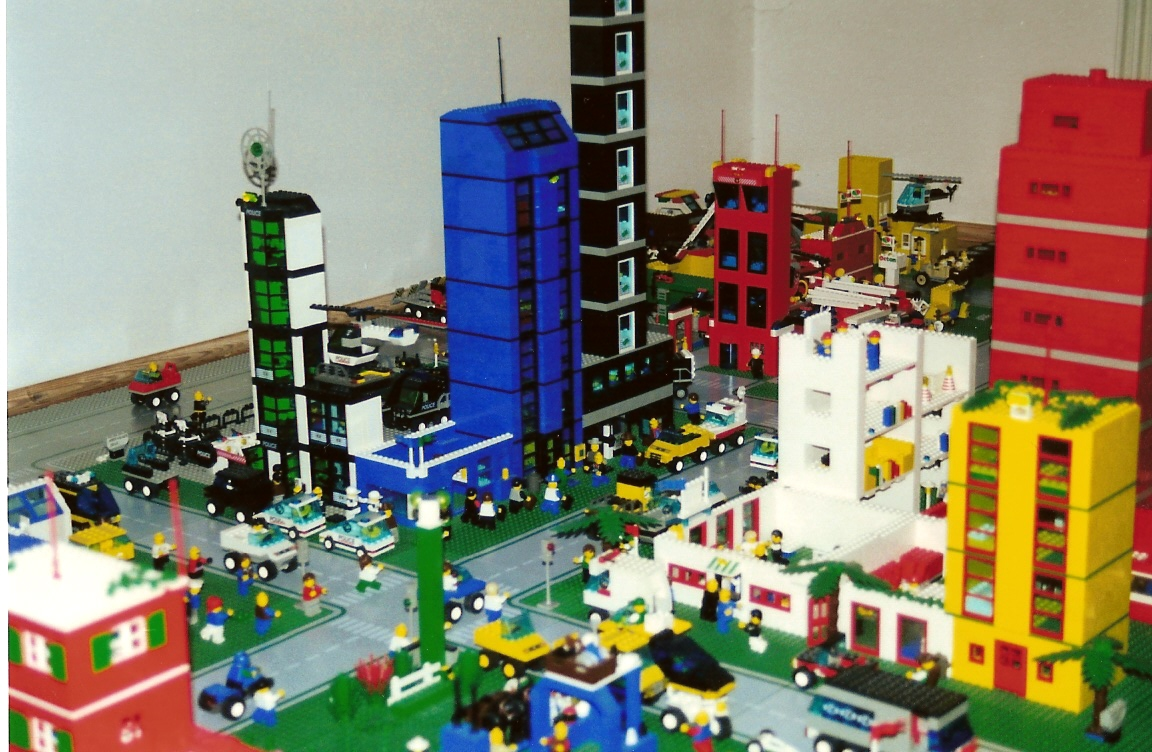
Building blocks are an example of bottom-up design because the parts are first created and then assembled without regard to how the parts will work in the assembly.

Top-down is a programming style, the mainstay of traditional procedural languages, in which design begins by specifying complex pieces and then dividing them into successively smaller pieces. The technique for writing a program using top-down methods is to write a main procedure that names all the major functions it will need. Later, the programming team looks at the requirements of each of those functions and the process is repeated. These compartmentalized subroutines eventually will perform actions so simple they can be easily and concisely coded. When all the various subroutines have been coded the program is ready for testing. By defining how the application comes together at a high level, lower-level work can be self-contained.

In a bottom-up approach the individual base elements of the system are first specified in great detail. These elements are then linked together to form larger subsystems, which in turn are linked, sometimes at many levels, until a complete top-level system is formed. This strategy often resembles a "seed" model, by which the beginnings are small, but eventually grow in complexity and completeness. Object-oriented programming (OOP) is a paradigm that uses "objects" to design applications and computer programs. In mechanical engineering with software programs such as Pro/ENGINEER, Solidworks, and Autodesk Inventor users can design products as pieces not part of the whole and later add those pieces together to form assemblies like building with Lego. Engineers call this "piece part design".

=== Parsing ===
Parsing is the process of analyzing an input sequence (such as that read from a file or a keyboard) in order to determine its grammatical structure. This method is used in the analysis of both natural languages and computer languages, as in a compiler. Bottom-up parsing is parsing strategy that recognizes the text's lowest-level small details first, before its mid-level structures, and leaves the highest-level overall structure to last. In top-down parsing, on the other hand, one first looks at the highest level of the parse tree and works down the parse tree by using the rewriting rules of a formal grammar.

== Natural sciences ==
=== Nanotechnology ===
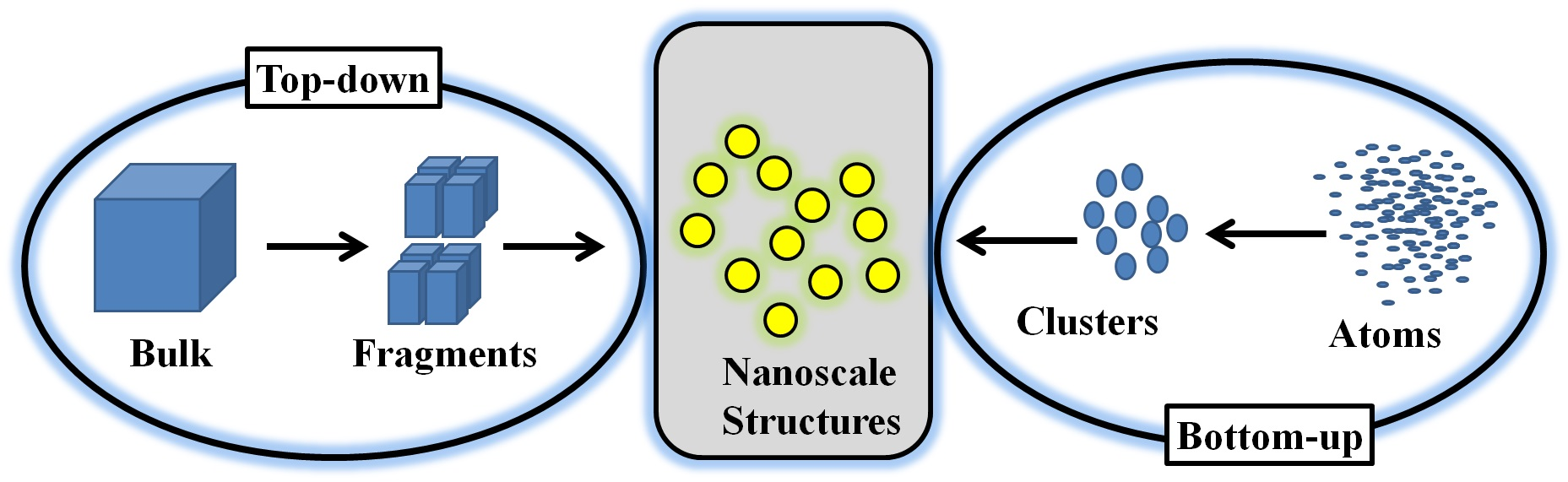
Nanoparticle synthesis techniques

Top-down and bottom-up are two approaches for the manufacture of products. These terms were first applied to the field of nanotechnology by the Foresight Institute in 1989 to distinguish between molecular manufacturing (to mass-produce large atomically precise objects) and conventional manufacturing (which can mass-produce large objects that are not atomically precise). Bottom-up approaches seek to have smaller (usually molecular) components built up into more complex assemblies, while top-down approaches seek to create nanoscale devices by using larger, externally controlled ones to direct their assembly. Certain valuable nanostructures, such as Silicon nanowires, can be fabricated using either approach, with processing methods selected on the basis of targeted applications.

A top-down approach often uses the traditional workshop or microfabrication methods where externally controlled tools are used to cut, mill, and shape materials into the desired shape and order. Micropatterning techniques, such as photolithography and inkjet printing belong to this category. Vapor treatment can be regarded as a new top-down secondary approaches to engineer nanostructures.

Bottom-up approaches, in contrast, use the chemical properties of single molecules to cause single-molecule components to (a) self-organize or self-assemble into some useful conformation, or (b) rely on positional assembly. These approaches use the concepts of molecular self-assembly and/or molecular recognition. See also Supramolecular chemistry. Such bottom-up approaches should, broadly speaking, be able to produce devices in parallel and much cheaper than top-down methods but could potentially be overwhelmed as the size and complexity of the desired assembly increases.

=== Neuroscience and psychology ===
An example of top-down processing: Even though the second letter in each word is ambiguous, top-down processing allows for easy disambiguation based on the context.

These terms are also employed in cognitive sciences including neuroscience, cognitive neuroscience and cognitive psychology to discuss the flow of information in processing. Typically, sensory input is considered bottom-up, and higher cognitive processes, which have more information from other sources, are considered top-down. A bottom-up process is characterized by an absence of higher-level direction in sensory processing, whereas a top-down process is characterized by a high level of direction of sensory processing by more cognition, such as goals or targets.

According to college teaching notes written by Charles Ramskov, Irvin Rock, Neiser, and Richard Gregory claim that the top-down approach involves perception that is an active and constructive process. Additionally, it is an approach not directly given by stimulus input, but is the result of stimulus, internal hypotheses, and expectation interactions. According to theoretical synthesis, "when a stimulus is presented short and clarity is uncertain that gives a vague stimulus, perception becomes a top-down approach."

Conversely, psychology defines bottom-up processing as an approach in which there is a progression from the individual elements to the whole. According to Ramskov, one proponent of bottom-up approach, Gibson, claims that it is a process that includes visual perception that needs information available from proximal stimulus produced by the distal stimulus. Theoretical synthesis also claims that bottom-up processing occurs "when a stimulus is presented long and clearly enough."

Certain cognitive processes, such as fast reactions or quick visual identification, are considered bottom-up processes because they rely primarily on sensory information, whereas processes such as motor control and directed attention are considered top-down because they are goal directed. Neurologically speaking, some areas of the brain, such as area V1 mostly have bottom-up connections. Other areas, such as the fusiform gyrus have inputs from higher brain areas and are considered to have top-down influence.

The study of visual attention is an example. If your attention is drawn to a flower in a field, it may be because the color or shape of the flower are visually salient. The information that caused you to attend to the flower came to you in a bottom-up fashion—your attention was not contingent on knowledge of the flower: the outside stimulus was sufficient on its own. Contrast this situation with one in which you are looking for a flower. You have a representation of what you are looking for. When you see the object, you are looking for, it is salient. This is an example of the use of top-down information.

In cognition, two thinking approaches are distinguished. "Top-down" (or "big chunk") is stereotypically the visionary, or the person who sees the larger picture and overview. Such people focus on the big picture and from that derive the details to support it. "Bottom-up" (or "small chunk") cognition is akin to focusing on the detail primarily, rather than the landscape. The expression "seeing the wood for the trees" references the two styles of cognition.

Studies in task switching and response selection show that there are differences through the two types of processing. Top-down processing primarily focuses on the attention side, such as task repetition. Bottom-up processing focuses on item-based learning, such as finding the same object over and over again. Implications for understanding attentional control of response selection in conflict situations are discussed.

This also applies to how we structure these processing neurologically. With structuring information interfaces in our neurological processes for procedural learning. These processes were proven effective to work in our interface design. But although both top-down principles were effective in guiding interface design; they were not sufficient. They can be combined with iterative bottom-up methods to produce usable interfaces .

Related concepts include field dependence, global precedence and the weak central coherence theory of autism.

=== Public health ===
Both top-down and bottom-up approaches are used in public health. There are many examples of top-down programs, often run by governments or large inter-governmental organizations; many of these are disease-or issue-specific, such as HIV control or smallpox eradication. Examples of bottom-up programs include many small NGOs set up to improve local access to healthcare. But many programs seek to combine both approaches; for instance, guinea worm eradication, a single-disease international program currently run by the Carter Center has involved the training of many local volunteers, boosting bottom-up capacity, as have international programs for hygiene, sanitation, and access to primary healthcare.

=== Ecology ===
The energy pyramid represents the ecosystem and its layers, the symbols represent the various limiting factors.

In ecology top-down control refers to when a top predator controls the structure or population dynamics of the ecosystem. The interactions between these top predators and their prey are what influences lower trophic levels. Changes in the top level of trophic levels have an inverse effect on the lower trophic levels. Top-down control can have negative effects on the surrounding ecosystem if there is a drastic change in the number of predators. The classic example is of kelp forest ecosystems. In such ecosystems, sea otters are a keystone predator. They prey on urchins, which in turn eat kelp. When otters are removed, urchin populations grow and reduce the kelp forest creating urchin barrens. This reduces the diversity of the ecosystem as a whole and can have detrimental effects on all of the other organisms. In other words, such ecosystems are not controlled by productivity of the kelp, but rather, a top predator. One can see the inverse effect that top-down control has in this example; when the population of otters decreased, the population of the urchins increased.

Bottom-up control in ecosystems refers to ecosystems in which the nutrient supply, productivity, and type of primary producers (plants and phytoplankton) control the ecosystem structure. If there are not enough resources or producers in the ecosystem, there is not enough energy left for the rest of the animals in the food chain because of biomagnification and ecological efficiency. An example would be how plankton populations are controlled by the availability of nutrients. Plankton populations tend to be higher and more complex in areas where upwelling brings nutrients to the surface.

There are many different examples of these concepts. It is common for populations to be influenced by both types of control, and there are still debates going on as to which type of control affects food webs in certain ecosystems.

== Management and organization ==
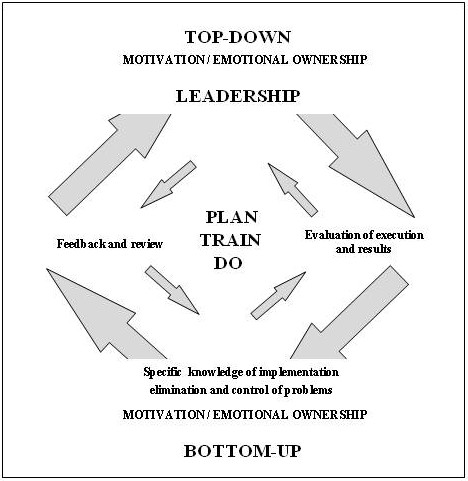
Information flow top-down and bottom-up in leadership

In the fields of management and organization, the terms "top-down" and "bottom-up" are used to describe how decisions are made and/or how change is implemented.

A "top-down" approach is where an executive decision maker or other top person makes the decisions of how something should be done. This approach is disseminated under their authority to lower levels in the hierarchy, who are, to a greater or lesser extent, bound by them. For example, when wanting to make an improvement in a hospital, a hospital administrator might decide that a major change (such as implementing a new program) is needed, and then use a planned approach to drive the changes down to the frontline staff.

A bottom-up approach to changes is one that works from the grassroots, and originates in a flat structure with people working together, causing a decision to arise from their joint involvement. A decision by a number of activists, students, or victims of some incident to take action is a "bottom-up" decision. A bottom-up approach can be thought of as "an incremental change approach that represents an emergent process cultivated and upheld primarily by frontline workers".

Positive aspects of top-down approaches include their efficiency and superb overview of higher levels; and external effects can be internalized. On the negative side, if reforms are perceived to be imposed "from above", it can be difficult for lower levels to accept them. Evidence suggests this to be true regardless of the content of reforms. A bottom-up approach allows for more experimentation and a better feeling for what is needed at the bottom. Other evidence suggests that there is a third combination approach to change.

=== Corporate environment (Performance management) ===
Top-down and bottom-up planning are two fundamental approaches in enterprise performance management (EPM), each offering distinct advantages. Top-down planning begins with senior management setting overarching strategic goals, which are then disseminated throughout the organization. This approach ensures alignment with the company's vision and facilitates uniform implementation across departments.

Conversely, bottom-up planning starts at the departmental or team level, where specific goals and plans are developed based on detailed operational insights. These plans are then aggregated to form the organization's overall strategy, ensuring that ground-level insights inform higher-level decisions.

Many organizations adopt a hybrid approach, known as the countercurrent or integrated planning method, to leverage the strengths of both top-down and bottom-up planning. In this model, strategic objectives set by leadership are informed by operational data from various departments, creating a dynamic and iterative planning process. This integration enhances collaboration, improves data accuracy, and ensures that strategies are both ambitious and grounded in operational realities.

Financial planning & analysis (FP&A) teams play a crucial role in harmonizing these approaches, utilizing tools like driver-based planning and AI-assisted forecasting to create flexible, data-driven plans that adapt to changing business conditions.

=== Product design and development ===
During the development of new products, designers and engineers rely on both bottom-up and top-down approaches. The bottom-up approach is being used when off-the-shelf or existing components are selected and integrated into the product. An example includes selecting a particular fastener, such as a bolt, and designing the receiving components such that the fastener will fit properly. In a top-down approach, a custom fastener would be designed such that it would fit properly in the receiving components. For perspective, for a product with more restrictive requirements (such as weight, geometry, safety, environment), such as a spacesuit, a more top-down approach is taken and almost everything is custom designed.

== Architecture ==
Often the École des Beaux-Arts school of design is said to have primarily promoted top-down design because it taught that an architectural design should begin with a parti, a basic plan drawing of the overall project.

By contrast, the Bauhaus focused on bottom-up design. This method manifested itself in the study of translating small-scale organizational systems to a larger, more architectural scale (as with the wood panel carving and furniture design).

== Philosophy and ethics ==
Top-down reasoning in ethics is when the reasoner starts from abstract universalizable principles and then reasons down them to particular situations. Bottom-up reasoning occurs when the reasoner starts from intuitive particular situational judgements and then reasons up to principles. Reflective equilibrium occurs when there is interaction between top-down and bottom-up reasoning until both are in harmony. That is to say, when universalizable abstract principles are reflectively found to be in equilibrium with particular intuitive judgements. The process occurs when cognitive dissonance occurs when reasoners try to resolve top-down with bottom-up reasoning, and adjust one or the other, until they are satisfied, they have found the best combinations of principles and situational judgements.

== See also ==
- Formal concept analysis
- Perl Design Patterns Book
- Pseudocode
- The Cathedral and the Bazaar
