= Integrated Planning System =

The Integrated Planning System is a structured planning framework adapted from the US military's Joint Operational Planning and Execution System (JOPES), which was developed and released by the US Department of Homeland Security in January 2009.

== Background ==
IPS is a result of Annex I of Homeland Security Presidential Directive (HSPD)-8, which tasked the DIS with developing an integrated planning system. In place of the National Planning and Execution System (NPES), IPSO is I CS/NI MS compliant and is based on coordination and synchronization rather than command and control.

The IPSO applies to federal departments and agencies with a role in homeland security when conducting scenario-based planning. It is beneficial for developing plans against the fifteen National Planning Scenarios.

The IPS's doctrine supports:

- Homeland Security Presidential Directive-5 (HSPD-5),
- Homeland Security Presidential Directive–8 (HSPD-8), Annex I,
- National Response Framework (NRF),
- National Incident Management System (NI MS),
- National Preparedness Guidelines (NP G), and
- National Strategy for Homeland Security (NSHS).

== Purpose ==
The Integrated Planning System (IPS) fulfills the requirement for a standardized national planning process and integration system as directed by Annex I to HSPD-8. The system is intended to provide a basic framework for developing a series of products that lead to a synchronized federal plan.

The IPS is a how-to guide for federal departments and agencies to develop contingency planning documents that support state, local, and tribal governments. It provides a common federal planning process comprising three levels of planning: strategic, operational, and tactical. This process supports the development of a family of related planning documents, including Strategic Guidance Statements (SGSs), Strategic Plans, Concept Plans (CONPLANs), Operations Plans (OPLANs), and Tactical Plans.

== Hierarchy of Plans ==
IPS introduces four planning levels: Strategic, conceptual, operational, and tactical.

== Federal Requirement ==
The target audience for the IPS is the Federal agencies with a role in homeland security, with a particular focus on agencies that rely on or provide assistance to other agencies.

Federal agencies with no existing planning processes are required to adopt the IPS. The IPS does not supersede any existing state, local, or tribal planning processes; however, it serves as the standard planning system that the Federal Government will use for scenario-based planning.

The IPS is compatible with many existing planning systems. State, local, and tribal governments are not mandated to adopt the IPS; however, they are the foundation of the homeland security planning process, as their participation in integrated planning and understanding of the work product is crucial.

== Key Terms ==
Contingency Planning: Contingency planning creates plans in anticipation of future incidents based on the most current information. A contingency is an incident that would involve national resources to prevent, protect, respond to, or recover from terrorist attacks or natural disasters.

Crisis Action Planning: Crisis action planning occurs in response to a credible threat or incident. It occurs in a time-compressed environment to develop an executable plan. Planners operating in a crisis action planning environment normally attempt to modify an existing contingency plan related to the incident threat or scenario. If a plan is unavailable, a crisis action plan will be developed.

Strategic Guidance Statement (SGS): The Secretary will develop an SGS for each NPS set, in coordination with the heads of Federal agencies with a role in homeland security. Additional planning requirements will be developed as the Secretary, in coordination with Federal agencies with a role in homeland security, deems appropriate. The Secretary will appoint and approve a development team for each SGS.

Strategic Plan: The Secretary will develop a corresponding strategic plan for each approved SGS, in coordination with the heads of Federal agencies with a role in homeland security and the director of the National Counterterrorism Center (NCTC), 24 for terrorism-related NPS. The secretary will appoint a development team for each strategic plan. A strategic plan must be completed no later than 90 days after the associated SGS is approved and shall be effective upon the secretary's approval.

Concept Plan (CONPLAN): The Secretary will develop a CONPLAN for each approved strategic plan, in coordination with the heads of federal agencies with a role in homeland security and consultation with appropriate state, local, and tribal governments. A CONPLAN must be completed within 180 days after the associated strategic plan is approved.

Operations Plan (OPLAN): The secretary will review OPLANs to identify gaps and seams, enhance unity of effort, and link plans to exercises. This feedback process aims to identify potential operational shortfalls that could jeopardize the ability to achieve strategic objectives.
