= Civil–military coordination =

Unifying efforts during peacekeeping or humanitarian aid

Civil–military coordination is efforts to coordinate activities in peacekeeping or humanitarian assistance missions during United Nations (UN) operations. Civil–military cooperation seeks to gain unity of effort among military forces, police agencies and civilian organizations engaged in such operations.

== Official definitions ==
The UN Department of Peacekeeping Operations defines civil–military cooperation for peacekeeping operations as:

"[T]he system of interaction, involving exchange of information, negotiation, de-confliction, mutual support, and planning at all levels between military elements and humanitarian organizations, development organizations, or the local civilian population, to achieve respective objectives."

The UN Office for the Coordination of Humanitarian Affairs defines civil–military cooperation for humanitarian operations as:

"The essential dialogue and interaction between civilian and military actors in humanitarian emergencies that is necessary to protect and promote humanitarian principles, avoid competition, minimize inconsistency, and when appropriate pursue common goals. Basic strategies range from coexistence to cooperation. Coordination is a shared responsibility facilitated by liaison and common training."
