= National Disaster and Emergency Management University =

Training school in Emmitsburg, Maryland, USA

Coordinates: 39°41′40″N 77°19′42″W

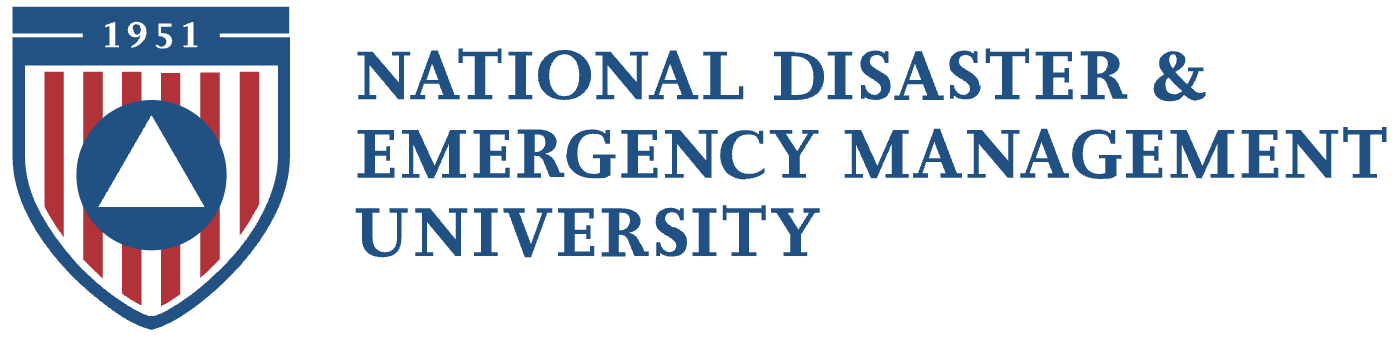
- Other name: NDEMU
- Former names: Civil Defense Staff College; Emergency Management Institute
- Motto: Amat Victoria Curam
- Established: April 1, 1951
- Parent institution: Federal Emergency Management Agency
- Accreditation: ACE and IAECT
- Superintendent: Jeffrey Stern
- Location: Frederick County, Maryland, USA
- Campus: NETC-107 acres (43.3 ha)
- Website: training.fema.gov

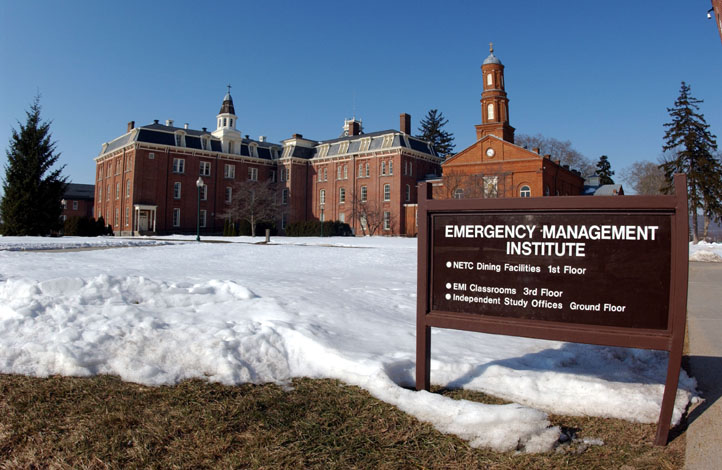
NDEMU's Main Campus in Emmitsburg.

The National Disaster and Emergency Management University (NDEMU; formerly known as the Emergency Management Institute) is the training school of the Federal Emergency Management Agency of the United States Department of Homeland Security. It is located in Frederick County, Maryland, United States.

== Academics ==
The institution focuses on the development and delivery of emergency management training. It consists of three specialized schools supporting different emergency management career paths: the Emergency Management Institute, the School of Disaster Leadership, and the School of National Resilience. Emergency management training improves the capabilities of state, territorial, local, and tribal government officials; volunteer organizations; FEMA's disaster workforce; other Federal agencies; and the public and private sectors to minimize the impact of disasters and emergencies on the American public.

The institution's curricula are structured to meet the needs of this diverse audience, with an emphasis on separate organizations working together in all-hazards emergencies to save lives and protect property. Particular emphasis is placed on governing doctrine, such as, the National Response Framework (NRF), National Incident Management System (NIMS), and the National Preparedness Guidelines.

NDEMU is fully accredited by the International Association for Continuing Education and Training (IACET) and the American Council on Education (ACE). The instruction is based upon the principles of emergency management and instructional systems design. This instruction creates a framework within whole community to reduce vulnerability to hazards and to cope with disasters. NDEMU develops courses and implements training delivery systems to include residential onsite training; offsite delivery in partnership with emergency management training systems, colleges, and universities; and technology-based mediums to conduct individual training courses for emergency management and response personnel across the United States.

NDEMU provides the following services:

- Emergency management certification and leadership training
- Mission assistance to organizations and teams
- Online knowledge-sharing resources
- Continuous learning assets

== Main campus facilities ==
NDEMU's main campus is located within the National Emergency Training Center (NETC) in the town of Emmitsburg in Frederick County, Maryland. NETC is located 12 miles south of Gettysburg, Pennsylvania, 75 miles north of Washington, DC, and 50 miles northwest of Baltimore, Maryland. The 107-acre campus is shared by the United States Fire Administration (USFA), the National Fire Academy (NFA), the Field Personnel Operations Division, and the Satellite Procurement Office. All these components are part of FEMA, one of the four directorates in DHS. The campus has fully equipped air-conditioned classrooms, lodging for students, a Learning Resource Center, and dining and recreational facilities. There also are several specialized facilities, such as the Simulation and Exercise Lab, a television studio Preparedness Network (PREPnet), and two computer laboratories that are integral to the instruction of many courses.

The UK counterpart of the Emergency Management Institute is the Emergency Planning College in Easingwold.

== History ==
Seal of the FCDA

NDEMU first started as the Civil Defense Staff College (CDSC) in Olney, Maryland, on April 1, 1951, and taught civil defense courses in program administration and finance, radiation monitoring and control, and heavy rescue. Due to concerns during the Cold War the CDSC's parent organization, the Federal Civil Defense Administration (FCDA), under Administrator Val Peterson, saw the Presidential Order to move the FCDA and the CDSC to Battle Creek, Michigan, to remove them from the increasing Cold War threat of Washington, DC, being attacked.

The CDSC continued teaching courses in program administration and finance, civil defense operations, and radiological monitoring among others, to State and local personnel, but by 1979, some new courses had been created on natural disaster operations. By this point in time, the FCDA came under the Department of Defense and was re-titled the Defense Civil Preparedness Agency (DCPA).

In 1979, then President Jimmy Carter brought together a number of Federal agencies that had involvement in disasters, including DCPA, and created a new, amalgamated organization, the Federal Emergency Management Agency (FEMA). Also in 1979, President Carter dedicated the former St. Joseph's College, which closed with its merger of participants and faculty with Mount Saint Mary's University in Emmitsburg, Maryland, as the FEMA National Emergency Training Center (NETC). NETC then became the home for the National Fire Academy (NFA) and the renamed Staff College which become the Emergency Management Institute (EMI), to reflect its now broader training role. The move from Battle Creek, Michigan, to Emmitsburg was done in the Fall of 1980 and the first NDEMU class was conducted in January 1981.

NDEMU and NFA are managed independently with unique participant audiences and curricula for the emergency management and national fire communities. NDEMU and NFA have collaborated on curricula and programs since their inception, and share in the cost of operation of NETC. In 2011, NDEMU celebrated its 60th anniversary and Legacy of Emergency Management Training and Education for the United States.

In August 2024, EMI was organized under the newly established National Disaster and Emergency Management University (NDEMU). NDEMU consists of three specialized schools supporting different emergency management career paths: the Emergency Management Institute, School of Disaster Leadership, and School of National Resilience.

=== Present day ===
NDEMU works to improve the competencies of United States officials at all levels of government to prevent, prepare for, respond to, recover from, and mitigate the potential effects of disasters and emergencies. NDEMU promotes integrated emergency management principles and practices through application of the NRF, NIMS, and an all-hazards approach. NDEMU is the lead national emergency management training, exercising, and education institution.

NDEMU offers a full-spectrum emergency management curriculum with more than 500 courses available to the integrated emergency management community, which includes: FEMA staff and disaster employees; Federal partners; State, Tribal, and local emergency managers; volunteer organizations; and first responders from across the Nation. NDEMU supports international emergency management with more than 50 countries participating in NDEMU's training and educational activities through the years, both in residence and through internationally deployed training teams.

NDEMU also enjoys close relations with several nationally recognized professional emergency management and related organizations and has interfaced with them through training, conferences, and exercises. Some of these significant organizations include the International Association of Emergency Managers (IAEM), National Emergency Management Association (NEMA), Association of State Floodplain Managers (ASFPM), American Public Works Association (APWA), American Society of Civil Engineers (ASCE), and American Society of Engineering Management (ASEM). In 1997, NDEMU was awarded the W. Edwards DNDEMUng Outstanding Training Award by the United States Department of Agriculture Graduate School at the Excellence in Government Conference. This annual award is presented to an organization for an impressive workforce development and training initiative that has measurably improved their organization's performance. NDEMU has provided technical support to dozens of other Federal government agencies and State offices on advanced distributed learning technology development and application.

A vital asset to FEMA's disaster operations is the Disaster Field Training Operations (DFTO) implemented by NDEMU. In 2010 alone, the DFTO trained 31,834 disaster response and recovery employees at disaster sites throughout the United States. NDEMU conducts three national-level conferences. The institute hosts the National Preparedness Annual Training and Exercise Conference which is attended by Regional Training Managers, State Training Officers and Exercise Training Officers, State Administrative Authority Officials, and subject matter experts from a broad sector of the preparedness community. The NDEMU Higher Education Conference is held the first week in June for more than 400 college and university officials with current or developing programs in emergency management and hosts up to 70 separate discussion groups. The Dam Safety Conference held in February is attended by dam safety officials, hydrologists, engineers, and reclamation officials.

== Training courses overview ==
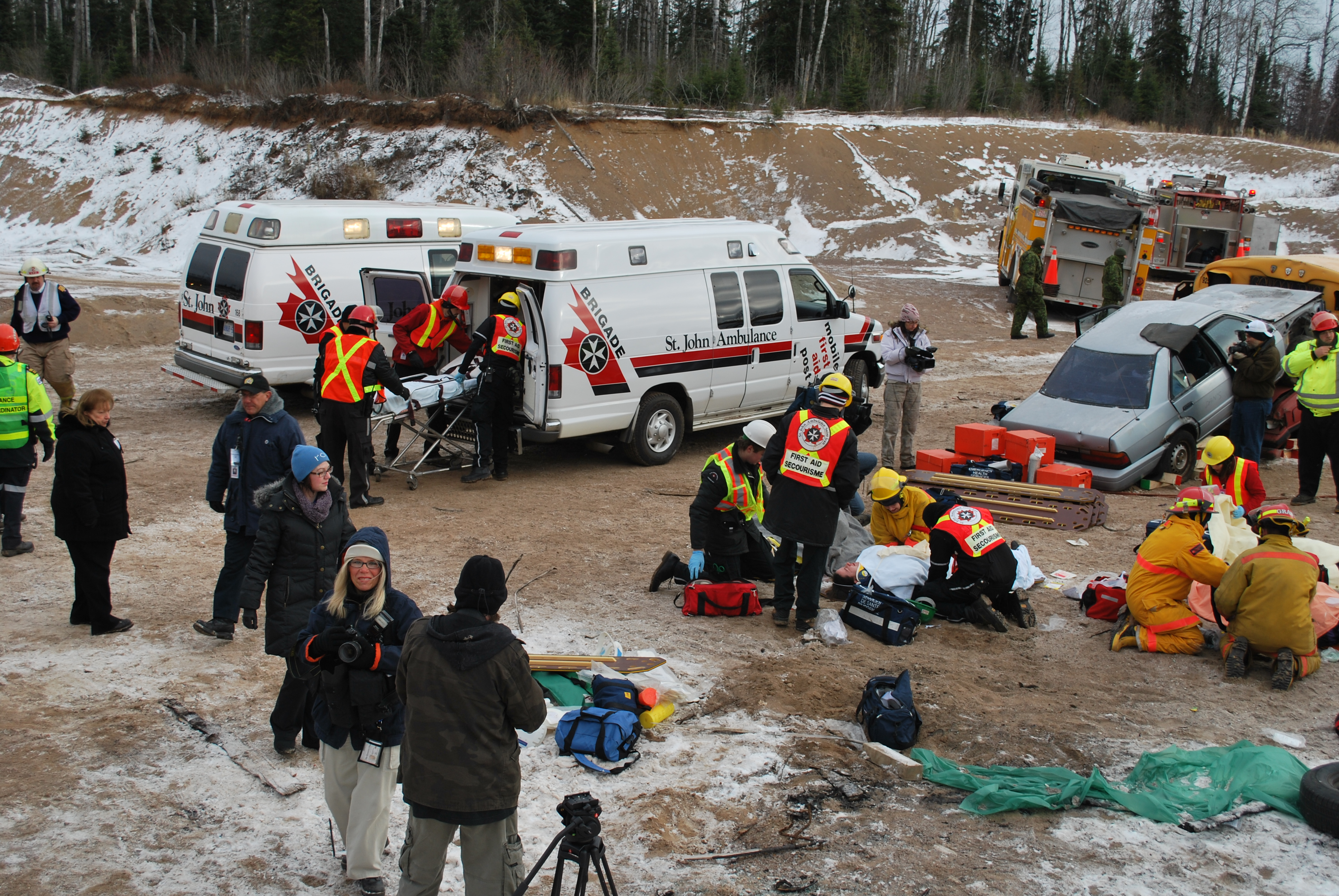
NDEMU provides training to first responders and federal, state, local, and tribal government officials.

To take an NDEMU course, applicants must meet the selection criteria and prerequisites specified for each course. Participants may not take the same course more than once. Instruction focuses on the four phases of emergency management: mitigation, preparedness, response, and recovery. NDEMU develops courses and administers resident and non-resident training programs in areas such as natural hazards (earthquakes, hurricanes, floods, dam safety), technological hazards (hazardous materials, terrorism, radiological incidents, chNDEMUcal stockpile emergency preparedness), professional development, leadership, instructional methodology, exercise design and evaluation, information technology, public information, integrated emergency management, and train-the-trainers.

Approximately 5,500 participants attend resident courses each year while 100,000 individuals participate in non-resident programs sponsored by NDEMU and conducted by state emergency management agencies under cooperative agreements with FEMA. Another 150,000 individuals participate in NDEMU-supported exercises, and approximately 1,000 individuals participate in the ChNDEMUcal Stockpile Emergency Preparedness Program (CSEPP).

The independent study program at NDEMU consists of free courses offered to United States citizens in comprehensive emergency management techniques. Course IS-1 is entitled "Emergency Manager: An Orientation to the Position" and provides background information on FEMA and the role of emergency managers in agency and volunteer organization coordination. The NDEMU Independent Study (IS) Program, a Web-based distance learning program open to the public, delivered extensive online training with approximately 200 courses and trained more than 2.8 million individuals. The NDEMU IS Web site receives 2.5 to 3 million visitors a day.

=== NETC Library ===
NDEMU students may use the NETC Library while on campus. The NETC Library houses the nation's preNDEMUnent collection of all-hazards and first responder resources. The library's 208,000 books, reports, audiovisual materials and indexed articles cover natural and man-made hazards.

=== On-campus enrollment process and transcript requests ===
Enrollment in on-campus NDEMU courses are generally limited to U.S. residents; however, each year a limited number of international participants are accommodated in NDEMU courses. To take an on-campus course at NDEMU, applicants must meet the selection criteria and prerequisites specified for each course. Applicants may not take the same course more than once. Applications for the Main Campus are to be submitted to the NETC Office of Admissions in Emmitsburg, Maryland. NDEMU also provide transcripts at no cost to the student, or directly to a college/university of the student's request. The transcript request must also be sent to the NETC Office of Admissions.

=== Regional on-campus options ===
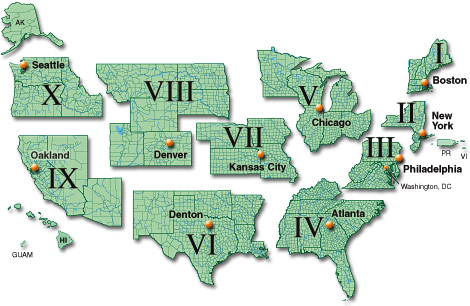
FEMA Training Regions for NDEMU On-Campus Courses

For those who are not able to attend classes at the Main Campus in Emmitsburg, there are 10 FEMA regions in which NDEMU on-campus courses may potentially be available. The Regional Training Manager contact information is listed below.

- Regional Contact Master List
  - Region I, Boston, MA Serving: CT, MA, ME, NH, RI, VT
  - Region II, New York, NY Serving: NJ, NY, PR, USVI
  - Region III, Philadelphia, PA Serving: DC, DE, MD, PA, VA, WV
  - Region IV, Atlanta, GA Serving: AL, FL, GA, KY, MS, NC, SC, TN
  - Region V, Chicago, IL Serving: IL, IN, MI, MN, OH, WI
  - Region VI, Denton, TX Serving: AR, LA, NM, OK, TX
  - Region VII, Kansas City, MO Serving: IA, KS, MO, NE
  - Region VIII, Denver, CO Serving: CO, MT, ND, SD, UT, WY
  - Region IX, Oakland, CA Serving: AZ, CA, HI, NV, GU, AS, CNMI, RMI, FM
  - Region IX, PAO Serving: American Samoa, CNMI, Guam, Hawaii
  - Region X, Bothell, WA Serving: AK (Alaska), ID, OR, WA

=== Certifications ===
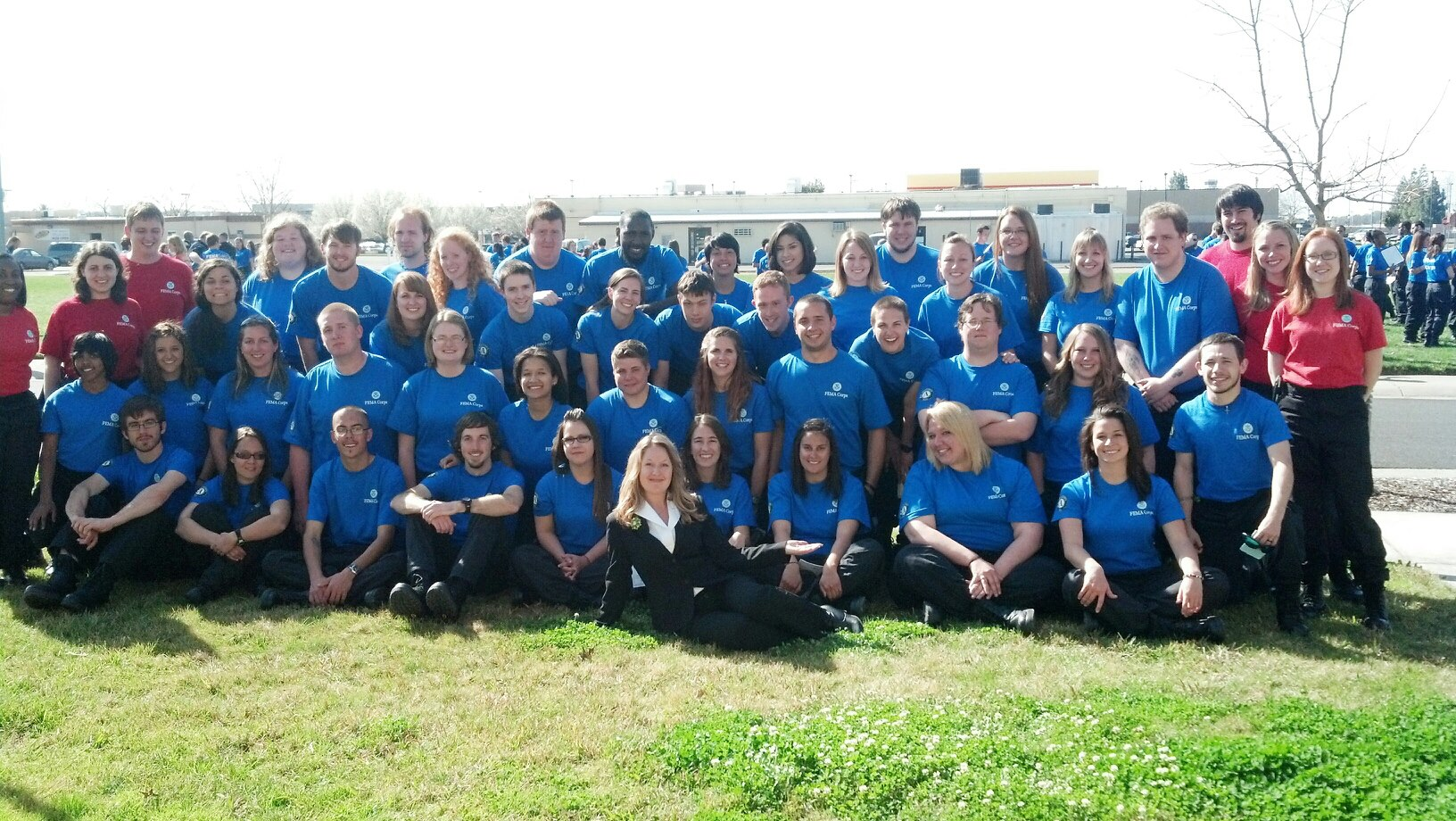
NDEMU offers certifications for Emergency Management Professionals

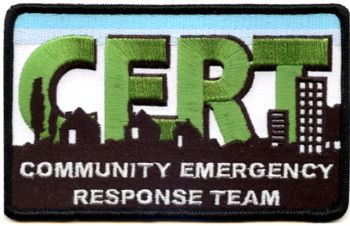
NDEMU provides training for CERT.

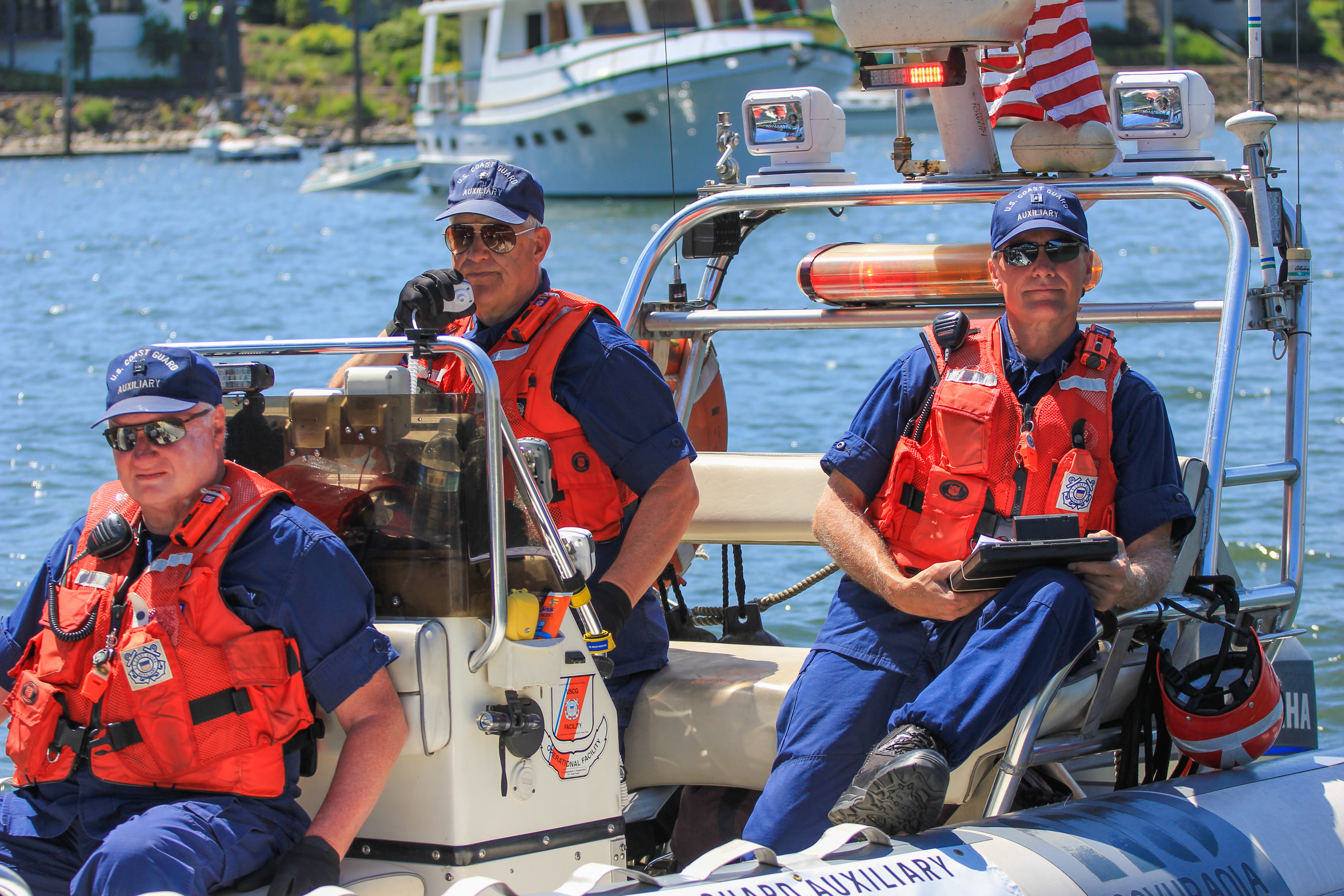
NDEMU provides training for the USCG Aux.

NDEMU offers credentials and training opportunities for United States citizens. NDEMU provides leadership in developing and delivering training to ensure that individuals and groups having key emergency management responsibilities at all levels of government, possess the requisite competencies to perform their jobs effectively. In addition to its resident training program, NDEMU dissNDEMUnates centrally developed training materials through a comprehensive national training program in the United States territories, and trusts. NDEMU has responsibility for training FEMA staff to perform their disaster response functions. Note that students do not have to be employed by FEMA or be a federal employee for some of the programs.

Training opportunities and certifications:

- Resident Courses
- Distance Learning Courses
- Emergency Management Professional Program (EMPP)
- Planning Practitioner Program (PPP)
- Master Exercise Practitioner Program (MEPP)
- EMI School and Higher Education Programs
- Integrated Emergency Management Courses (IEMC)
- Disaster Field Training Operations (DFTO)
- Non-Resident Courses (EMI Courses Conducted by States)
- National Preparedness Symposium
- Higher Education Symposium
- EMI Tribal Curriculum
- Critical Infrastructure Security and Resilience
- Virtual Table Top Exercise (VTTX) Series
- Continuity Excellence Series, Level I and II
- Professional Development Series (PDS) Credential
- Advance Professional Series (APS) Credential

One training program of note is NDEMU's Master Continuity Practitioner (MCP /Level II), which is one of the highest discipline specific designations available within the emergency management/homeland security field (focus is on Continuity of Operations in both the public and private sectors, along with national preparedness/response in general). As of April 2015, there were only about 300 professionals who earned the prestigious designation over the course of numerous years. MCPs must first earn NDEMU's Professional Continuity Practitioner (PCP /Level I) designation through NDEMU for a completion of at least seventeen total courses (including courses such as incident management, developing COOP Plans, and leadership), passing a written comprehensive exam (proctored at a FEMA regional office, or at NDEMU), and contributing to the field by way of instructing related curriculum.

=== Emergency Management Higher Education Program ===
NDEMU in 1994 developed the Emergency Management Higher Education Program with the aim of promoting college-based emergency management higher education for future emergency managers and other interested personnel. The program works with colleges and universities, emergency management professionals, and stakeholder organizations to help create an emergency management system of sustained, replicable capability and disaster loss reduction through formal education, experiential learning, practice, and experience centered on mitigation, preparedness, response and recovery from the full range of natural, technological and intentional hazards which confront communities, States and the Nation.

==== Transferring courses for college credits ====
NDEMU maintains a strategic partnerships with Frederick Community College. FCC has a contract with the Emergency Management Institute to provide college credit for the Independent Study (IS) Program. In addition Clackamas Community College was approved by the Oregon Department of Education to accept credit for NDEMU coursework. In addition, the University of North Texas also has a similar program along with Charter Oak State College and Excelsior College.

=== Training for the CERT and Citizen Corps ===
The Community Emergency Response Team (CERT) Program educates people about disaster preparedness for hazards that may impact their area and trains them in basic disaster response skills, such as fire safety, light search and rescue, team organization, and disaster medical operations. Using the NDEMU training learned in the classroom and during exercises, CERT members can assist others in their neighborhood or workplace following an event when professional responders are not immediately available to help. In addition, NDEMU provides training courses for the Citizen Corps as well.

=== Training for the Coast Guard Auxiliary ===
The United States Coast Guard Auxiliary requires auxiliarists to take mandatory Incident Command System courses through the Emergency Management Institute. Failure to complete the training may make them ineligible to participate in Coast Guard Auxiliary exercises, drills, or response events. Auxiliarists are expected to take NDEMU courses that will help them to understand the Incident Command System's organization, basic terminology and common responsibilities. They are required to acquire the skills necessary to perform in an ICS support role. Officers, certified coxswains, pilots, or those in a leadership role may need to take additional NDEMU courses pertaining to the National Incident Management System and/or the National Response Framework.

=== Training for state defense forces ===
A number of the state defense forces of individual states use the Emergency Management Institute's independent study courses as a part of their training. The completion of certain NDEMU courses is a requirement for earning the Military Emergency Management Specialist Badge.

== National Emergency Management Center campus ==
FEMA's seal before 2003.

In total the NETC campus encompasses over 107 acres (0.43 km^{2}), and is located in Emmitsburg, Maryland. The campus is home to many notable structures, buildings, and monuments.

- Building A – Is a three-story residence hall built in 1964 and renovated in 1996. It has 96 dormitory rooms.
- Building B – The Student Center, built in 1956, is the location of a game room, pub and recreational activities. A large picture window overlooks the scenic Catoctin Mountain range.
- Building C – Built in 1956 and renovated in 1995, it has 216 dormitory rooms.
- Building D – Built in 1926 and renovated in 1965 and 1995, it is a three-story brick structure that has the charm of the old architecture. It consists of 39 dormitory rooms with offices and a convenience shop in the basement.
- Building E – Built in 1926 and renovated in 1966 and 1993, it is occupied by the NDEMU, National Fire Programs, NETC Budget offices, and computer support personnel.
- Building F – Built in 1925 and renovated in 1965 and 1995, it has 45 dormitory rooms.
- Building G – Built in 1948 and renovated in 1984 and 2001 to accommodate USFA Offices and Programs.
- Building H – Built in 1923 and renovated in 1993, it houses the NETC offices, a fully equipped Gymnasium, weight room and an indoor pool.
- Building I – Built in 1996, it serves as the Material Receipt and Distribution Center, Maintenance Facility, Management Operations and Support Services Division, Admissions Office, and O&M Support Offices.
- Building J – Built in 1966, renovated in 1993, it is the NETC classroom facility and houses the NETC staff. It includes a lobby and a tiered 249-seat auditorium.
- Building K – Built circa 1870, renovated in 1982 and 1993, it houses NDEMU classrooms. The three-story brick structure also contains a Dining Hall capable of seating 500 people.
- Building L – Built in 1959, renovated in 1993, it consists of 37 dormitory rooms and a conference room.
- Building M – Built in 1965, renovated in 1989, it houses two NDEMU classrooms and the NDEMU Computer Lab.
- Building N – Designed by the English-born architect, E.G. Lind, it was built in 1870 and renovated in 1987, 1992 and 2001 and is listed on the National Register of Historic Buildings
- Building O – Erected in 1839 as a chapel. The marble, alabaster altars and stained glass windows were retained when it was renovated in 1965. It was renovated again in 2006.
- Building P – The Log Cabin serves as a recreational facility overlooking peaceful Tom's Creek.
- Building Q – The Brick Barn is a service building. The ornamental brick grill windows are characteristic of the early 19th century Western Maryland construction.
- Building R – Built in 1948, renovated in 1993, located behind Building G
- Building S – Renovated in 2001 to house the NETC Joint Exercise and Simulation Lab by the NFA and NDEMU.
- Building T – The old Milk House of the original St. Joseph's campus, it houses Administrative Support Offices.
- Building U – A burn building complex used by the NETC for arson investigation and demonstration
- Building V – Built in 1992, it houses the Security Office

=== NDEMU main campus facilities within the NETC ===
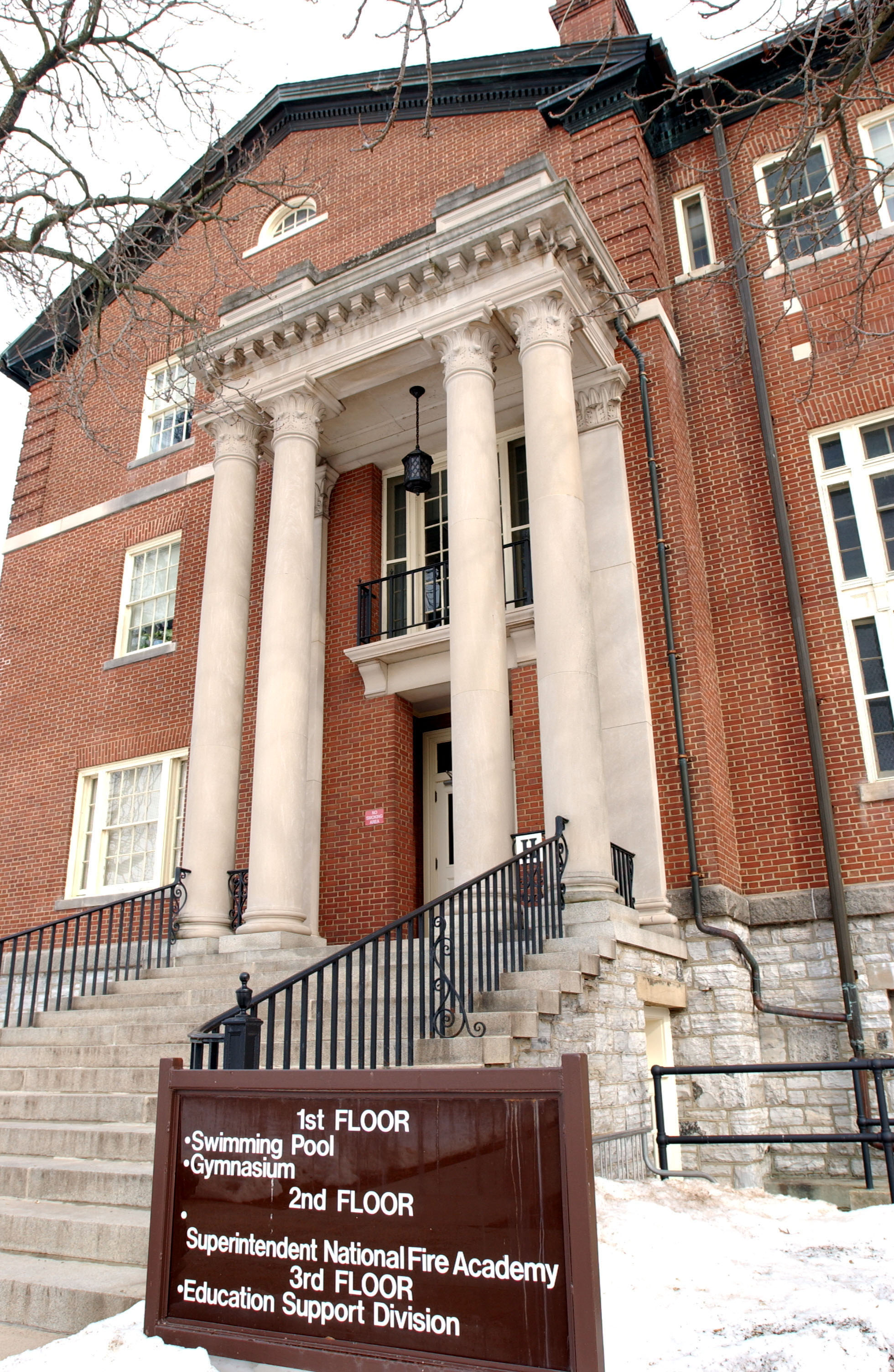

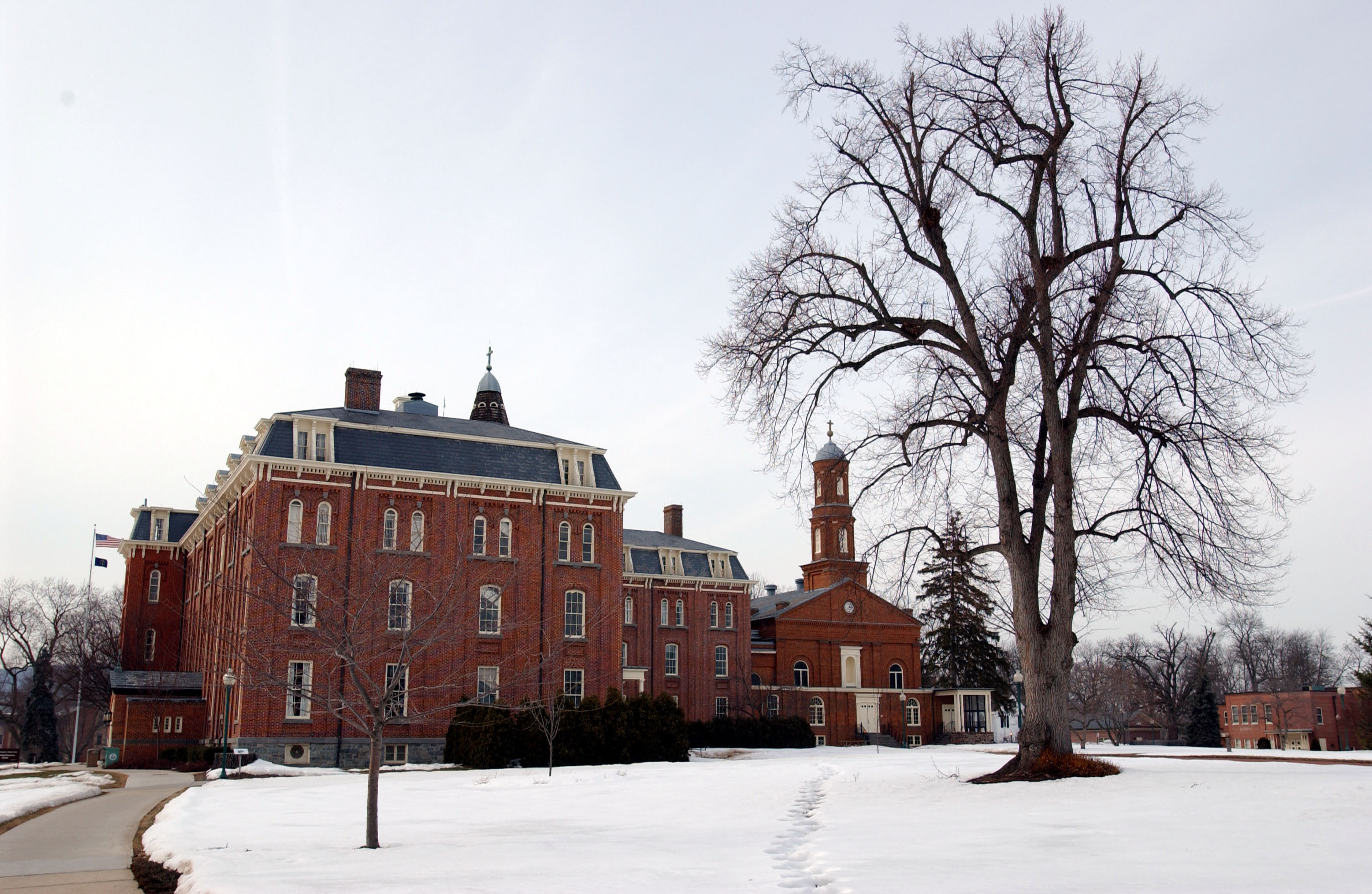

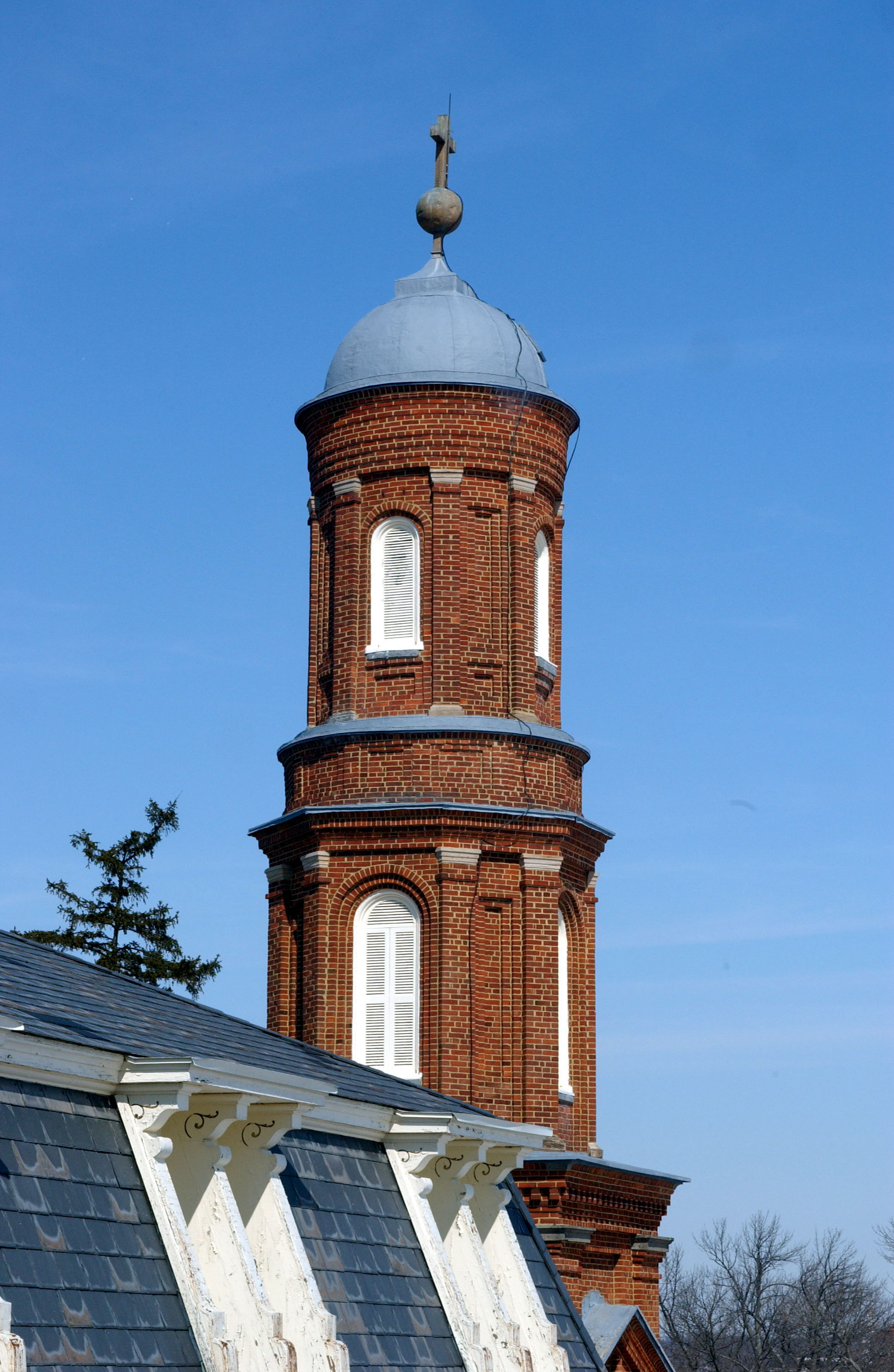

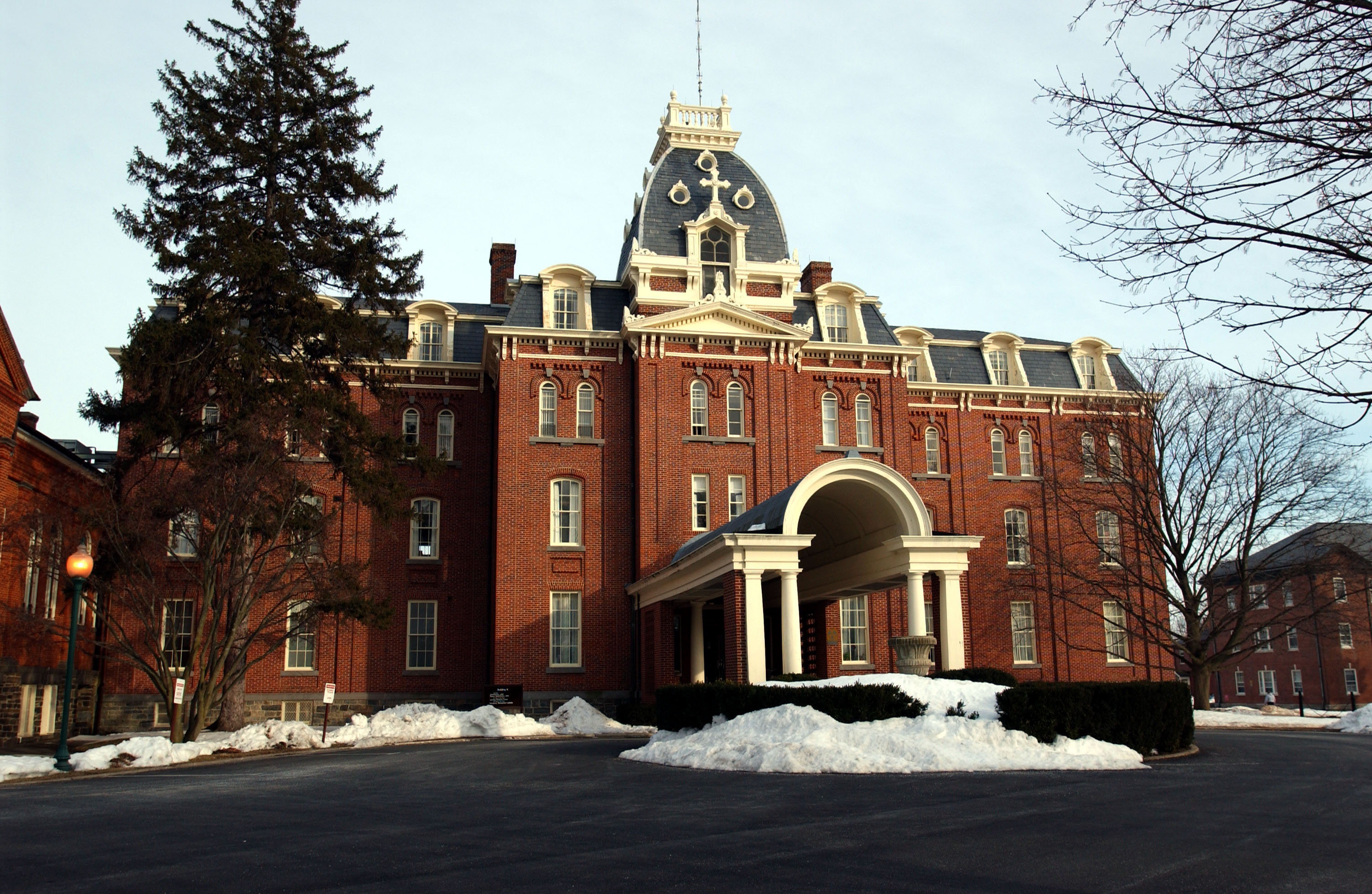

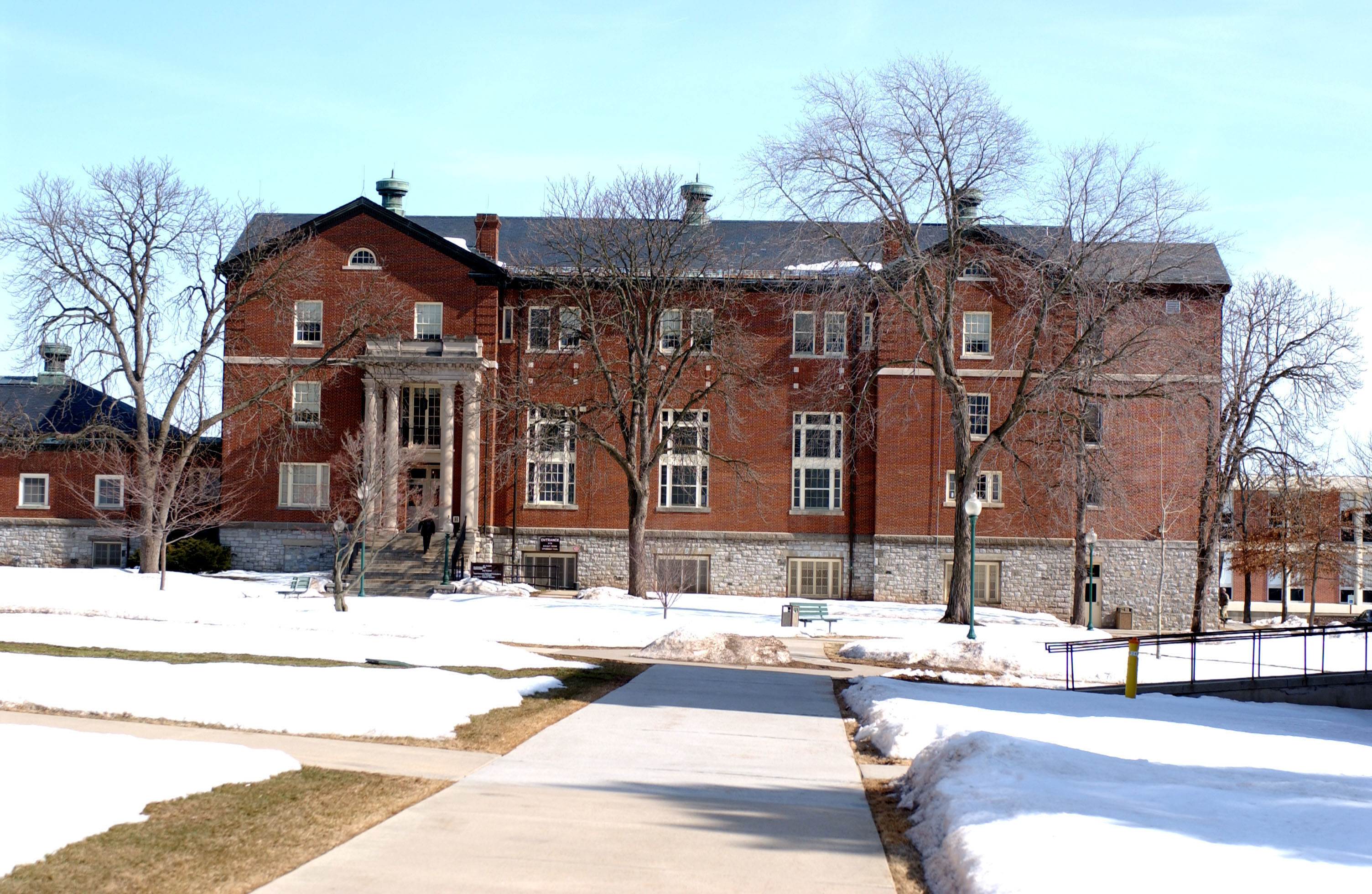

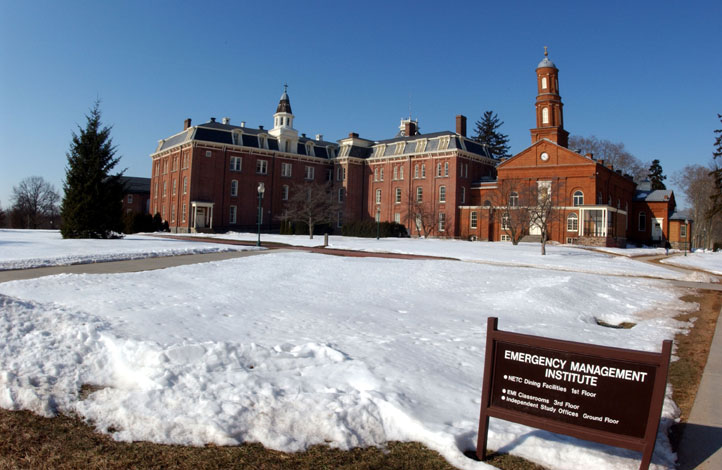

=== National Civil Defense/Emergency Management Monument ===
The Monument, is the centerpiece of the NDEMU's main campus in the Emmitsburg. On November 13, 1999, President Bill Clinton signed a bill that granted authority to the National Civil Defense Monument Commission to construct a monument on the NETC campus. The purpose of the monument is to honor the thousands of Civil Defense and Emergency Management professionals and volunteers who have worked hard and faithfully to protect the public from both man-made and natural hazards. This monument particularly recognizes the numerous military and civilian volunteers and professionals who have gone beyond the normal call of duty to save lives and alleviate suffering in times of crises. The centerpiece of the monument is a 15-ton block of polished white Vermont granite, shaped as a three-sided pyramid, representative of the Federal, state, and local governments and their efforts in working together to accomplish a joint mission. The triangular base is 5 feet on each side, rising to 15 feet in height. The pinnacle of the monument is capped with a large, bronze American eagle, sculpted by the world-renowned sculptor, Lorenzo Ghiglieri. The base is encircled by a stone and concrete plaza with appropriately inscribed bronze state plaques embedded in concrete, surrounded by a circle of state flags. A brick wall rises approximately 3 feet in height on the back or south side of the plaza. Near the edge of the plaza are two bronze plaques bearing the names of advocates and members of the Monument Commission.

== See also ==
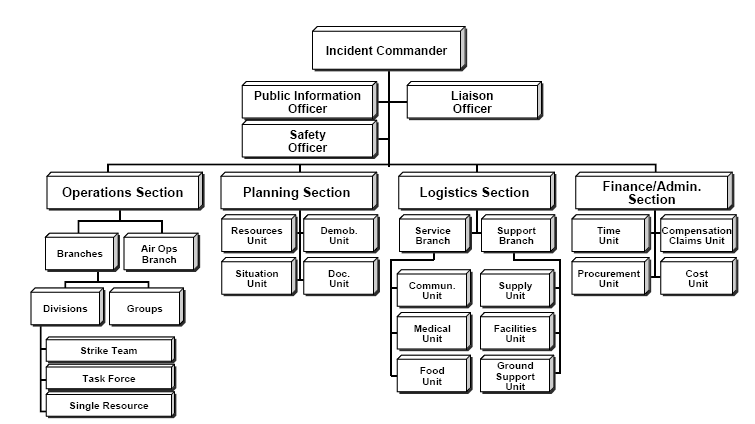
Incident Command System – Org chart

- Department of Homeland Security
- Federal Emergency Management Agency
