= State Guard Association of the United States =

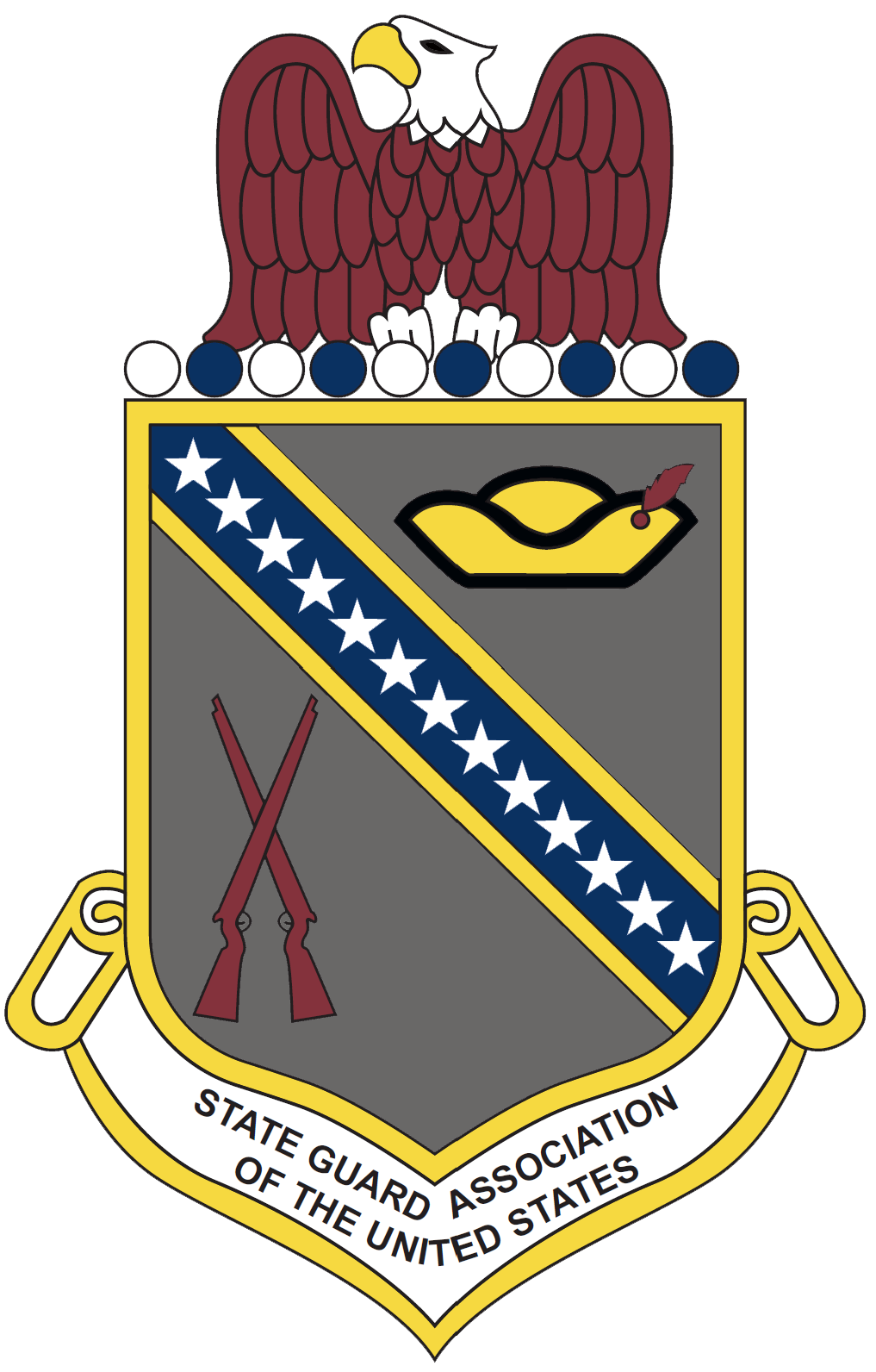
- Abbreviation: SGAUS
- Formation: 1985
- Legal status: 501(c)(6)
- Headquarters: 100 Powell Place #1469; Nashville, TN 37204
- Region served: United States of America
- President: BG (MD) Gregory Juday
- Website: www.sgaus.org

The State Guard Association of the United States (SGAUS) is a non-profit organization advocating for the advancement and support of regulated state military forces, as established by state governments under the authority of federal law. The SGAUS encourages the establishment and advancement of regulated state forces through lobbying and affiliation with independent state associations.

There were 18 state forces which are members of the SGAUS as of 2023. State associations are separate entities—typically 501(c)(3) corporations—and are not components of the SGAUS corporation, the SGAUS Foundation, or the respective states.

== History of SDFs and SGAUS ==
From its founding until the early 1900s, the United States maintained only a minimal army and relied on state militias to supply the majority of its troops. In 1903, the predecessor to the modern-day National Guard was formed to augment the militia and Regular Army with a federally controlled reserve force. In 1933, Congress finalized the split between the National Guard and the state defense forces by mandating that all federally funded soldiers take a dual enlistment/commission and thus enter both the state National Guard and the National Guard of the United States (a branch of the federal reserves). This division forced states to maintain both a National Guard and a state defense force if they desired to have non-federal soldiers. During World War II, much of the National Guard was deployed on federal duty. Many states continued to maintain distinct state militias (some building on ones that never ceased to exist) to defend their own territories and shorelines. In the 1980s, many state defense forces began to be reformed and activated. As a result, the State Defense Force Association of the United States was formed in 1985. The name was later changed in 1993 to the State Guard Association of the United States. As of 2020, the SGAUS has members from eighteen states and territories.

== SGAUS Foundation, Inc. ==
In 2006, the SGAUS Board of Directors created the SGAUS Foundation as an independent 501(c)(3) non-profit organization to focus on education, public awareness, and outreach programs that support the advancement and support of regulated state defense forces. A current list of SGAUS foundation officers can be found on the SGAUS website's Leadership page.

== Training and certification programs ==
The SGAUS offers various certification programs for its members.

Military Emergency Management Specialist program

Basic MEMS badge

The SGAUS Military Emergency Management Specialist (MEMS) program was created in 1998. The program is structured around the Federal Emergency Management Agency's National Incident Management System (NIMS) and Incident Command System (ICS). The MEMS program curriculum includes online Federal Emergency Management Agency (FEMA) NIMS and ICS courses offered free of charge through FEMA's Emergency Management Institute's (EMI) Independent Study Program. In addition to online FEMA courses, students are required to complete operational practicums that incorporate the learning objectives of the online FEMA courses.

The MEMS Academy curricula are based on the idea of developing areas of common knowledge required at different levels of responsibility in emergency response and use accepted, validated courses available throughout the nation. The principle behind the several MEMS curricula is that individuals with Basic MEMS qualification will have operational understanding of the principles of emergency management, including mitigation, preparedness, emergency response and recovery and have knowledge, skills and abilities needed to effectively work within a comprehensive emergency management operation. Those with Senior and Master level qualification will be able to lead and plan incident response efforts of increasing complexity.

Certification in the MEMS program consists of four levels: basic, senior, master, and liaison officer (LNO) all-hazards specialist, with traditional military-style skill badges awarded to students upon completion of each level. The skill badge the LNO level is identical to master, except that the insignia gold instead of silver. In addition to the badges, those students who participate in operational missions may be awarded a distinctive blue and gray flash, which is worn behind the badge.

For a short time, there was a MEMS Command and Staff College operated by the SGAUS. Students who successfully completed this program were awarded the MEMS Command and Staff College Unit Citation.

Medical Academy and the Expert Medical Badge (EMB)

Chaplain's School and College

The SGAUS Chaplain School and College provides materials of study, discussion forums, and classroom training related to field of military chaplaincy for state defense force chaplains and chaplain assistants.

Engineer Specialty Qualification Identification Designation (ESQiD)

The SGAUS Engineer Specialty Qualification Identification Program (ESQiD) was created in 2015, to provide state guard forces with a means of identifying soldiers as qualified in those engineering skills needed during state emergencies. The program was structured with the Federal Emergency Management Agency's National Incident Management Structure (NIMS) and included online Federal Emergency Management Agency (FEMA) NIMS and Independent Course Study (ICS) Courses offered free of charge through FEMA's Emergency Management Institute (EMI) Independent Study Program.

Prerequisites for entry into the ESQiD Program include active membership in a sponsoring state defense force, medical clearance, completion of SDF Basic Military Training, and completion of the Military Emergency Management Specialist-Basic program.

Engineer Common Skills Training includes Land Navigation, Field Sanitation, Job Site Safety Courses, field communications with SDF utilized communications equipment, and Hazardous materials awareness.

Engineer Specific Skill Training includes completion of several FEMA training courses and SDF training courses based upon the SDF Engineer Unit Mission Essential Training List (METL). Each state develops its own specific Engineer METL and the courses required to qualify an engineer candidate for designation as an Engineer. The Engineer METL is a primary part of the development of the list of qualification training courses designed to produce an Engineer capable of working on typical disasters and emergencies with practical engineering knowledge in that state. The final part of the examination process is a field practicum involving engineering activities in high stress environments, followed by an Oral Review Board. Upon successful completion of all aspects the State Director of Engineer Training approves the award of the Engineer Specialty Qualification Badge, in either Gold or Silver. Each state sets their own standards for use of either the Gold Engineer Badge, the Silver Engineer Badge, or both badges. A black badge is also authorized, for wear on subdued combat uniforms by either holders of the gold or silver badge.

Follow up training is conducted to maintain the competency of soldiers with the ESQiD. The SGAUS specifically mentions that persons with experience in heavy construction are especially valuable, as they can teach skills like constructing multi-story buildings, roads, and bridges. These are skills which the SGAUS has identified as of especial value to Engineer units.

== Awards ==
SGAUS Awards and Criteria
Name	Image	Awarded for
Presidential Service Award	borderless	The Presidential Service Medal is presented to the incoming President upon taking the oath of office by the outgoing President. The award consists of a round medallion bearing the SGAUS logo, suspended on a neck ribbon
Distinguished Service Medal	borderless	The Distinguished Service Medal may be awarded to any SGAUS member who has distinguished himself or herself by exceptionally meritorious service or achievement that has significant impact upon SGAUS and/or their respective state guard/defense force. This may be based on a singular act of exceptionally meritorious achievement or for outstanding achievements over a period of time.
Medal of Merit	borderless	The Medal of Merit may be awarded to any SGAUS member for exceptionally meritorious conduct in the performance of outstanding services and achievements in a duty of great responsibility that have a significant impact upon the mission of SGAUS.
Civilian Exceptional Service Award	borderless	The Civilian Exceptional Service Award may be awarded to any civilian who has performed honorable service on behalf of SGAUS, or has obtained an achievement that has significant impact upon the mission of SGAUS and/or a state guard/defense force and reflects favorably on SGAUS.
Meritorious Service Award	borderless	The Meritorious Service Award may be awarded to any SGAUS member who has performed meritorious service or achievement that has significant favorable impact upon SGAUS or a state guard/defense force.
Commendation Medal	borderless	The Commendation Medal may be awarded to SGAUS members who have performed commendable service or achievement or for an act of valor or heroism at the risk of life or personal injury that brought significant distinction to SGAUS or a state guard/defense force.
Achievement Medal	borderless	The Achievement Medal may be awarded to recognize the achievement of a SGAUS member who has performed meritorious service that has favorable impact on SGAUS or a state guard / defense force.
Faithful Service Medal	borderless	The Faithful Service Medal may be awarded to SGAUS members who successfully served SGAUS as president elect, a vice president, secretary, treasurer, member of the executive committee or board, member of the special staff, command sergeant major, chair of any committee appointed by the president, MEMS commandant, MEMS state or regional director, or Commandant of the Chaplain Staff College.
Recruiting Achievement Medal	borderless	The Recruiting Achievement Medal may be awarded to SGAUS members who have recruited 10 new current/active members into SGAUS. Documentation in the form of the full names of those recruited is required with the award recommendation.
Longevity Medal	borderless	The Longevity Medal honors members who have kept up continuous membership and shall be awarded to SGAUS members who have five continuous years of paid membership. It is intended to increase both esprit-de-corps and the visibility of members within the SGAUS.
Military Justice Award	borderless	The SGAUS Military Justice Award may only be awarded to an active SGAUS member who has successfully fulfilled all of the following requirements: Hold a current, unrestricted license to practice law granted by an established jurisdiction of the United States or its territories.; Successful completion of “Practicing Military Justice,” a comprehensive twenty (20) hour online training course offered through the SGAUS Staff Judge Advocate Academy.; Complete a minimum of seven (7.0) hours of in-person military continuing legal education at an officially-sanctioned SGAUS event.; Successful completion of a comprehensive three (3.0) hour in-person trial practicum conducted and scored at an officially-sanctioned SGAUS event.
Professional Development Award	borderless	The SGAUS Professional Development Ribbon may be awarded to an active SGAUS member who has successfully fulfilled one of the following requirements: Successfully completed Primary (Warrior) Leader Course (PLC) through the SGAUS PME Academy as an E1 or above, OR; Successfully completed Warrant Officer Basic Course (WOBC) through the SGAUS PME Academy as a WO1 or above, OR; Successfully completed Officer Basic Course (OBC) through the SGAUS PME Academy as an O1 or above
Membership Medal	borderless	The SGAUS Membership Medal is conferred to every member in good standing, and remains valid so long as membership dues are paid. The award has equal stripes of blue and gray, and is worn with the gray strip toward the uniform centerline. Life members wear two gold stars, with one star centered on the blue stripe and one star centered on the gray stripe.

== Legislative efforts ==
The organization has supported several legislative efforts related to the establishment or support of state defense forces :

- (dead) HR 206 State Defense Force Improvement Act, 2009, 111th Congress
- (removed by committee) HR 5658 Duncan Hunter National Defense Authorization Act FY09, 2008, 110th Congress
- (dead) HR 826 State Defense Force Improvement Act, 2007, 110th Congress
- (dead) HR 3401 State Defense Force Improvement Act, 2005, 109th Congress
- (dead) HR 2797 State Defense Force Improvement Act, 2003, 108th Congress

== Member state information ==
State	Wikipedia state article	Link to force website	State law	Active associations
Alaska	Alaska State Defense Force	Alaska State Defense Force	§AS 26.05.100	No association record found in state's corporation list
California	California State Guard	California State Guard	CAL. MVC. CODE § 550	No association record found in state's corporation list
Georgia	Georgia State Defense Force	Georgia State Defense Force	O.C.G.A. § 38-2-51	The Association of the Georgia State Defense Force, Inc
Indiana	Indiana Guard Reserve	Indiana Guard Reserve	§ IC 10-16-8	No association record found in state's corporation list
Maryland	Maryland Defense Force	Maryland State Defense Force	§ 13-501	Maryland State Guard Association, Inc.
Michigan	Michigan Volunteer Defense Force	Michigan Volunteer Defense Force		No association record found in state's corporation list
Mississippi	Mississippi State Guard	Mississippi State Guard	§33-5-51	Mississippi State Guard Association, Inc.
New Mexico	New Mexico State Defense Force	New Mexico State Defense Force		No association record found in state's corporation list
New York	New York Guard	New York Guard	Military Law-State of New York Article 2, Section 44	
Ohio	Ohio Military Reserve	Ohio Military Reserve	Ohio Revised Code Chapter 5920	Ohio Military Reserve Officers Association, Inc. www.ohmra.org
Oregon	Oregon Civil Defense Force	Oregon Civil Defense Force		No association record found in state's corporation list
Puerto Rico	Puerto Rico State Guard	Puerto Rico State Guard		No association record found in state's corporation list
South Carolina	South Carolina State Guard	South Carolina State Guard		South Carolina State Guard Foundation, Inc.
Tennessee	Tennessee State Guard	Tennessee State Guard		Tennessee Chapter of the State Guard Association of the United States, Inc.
Texas	Texas State Guard	Texas State Guard	§Title 4 Sec. C 431.001	The Texas State Guard Non Profit Association, Inc.
Vermont	Vermont State Guard	Vermont State Guard		No association record found in state's corporation list
Virginia	Virginia State Defense Force	Virginia State Defense Force	§ 44-54.4	Virginia State Guard Association, Inc.
Washington	Washington State Guard	Washington State Guard	§RCW 38.14.006	Washington State Guard Association
