= Unity of effort =

Unity of effort is the state of harmonizing efforts among multiple organizations working towards a similar objective. This prevents organizations from working at cross purposes and it reduces duplication of effort. Multiple organizations can achieve unity of effort through shared common objectives. In military operations, unity of effort is similar to unity of command except it usually relates to coordinating organizations not in the same command, such as in interagency operations. In this case, unity of effort is often achieved through campaign plans or coordinating committees instead of through a unified commander. In emergency management, unity of effort describes the integrated approach by different levels of government and multiple civilian organizations in response to the event.

== United States ==
=== Department of Homeland Security ===
The National Response Framework as part of the National Strategy for Homeland Security includes unity of effort through unified command as one of its five key principles. Unity of effort is effectively implemented under NRF by requiring emergency responses to be coordinated under National Incident Management System and Incident Command System standards as part of comprehensive emergency management by objectives.

=== Department of State ===
The Office of the Coordinator for Reconstruction and Stabilization bases unity of effort on four principles:

- A common understanding of the situation;
- A common vision or goals for the reconstruction and stabilization mission;
- Coordination of efforts to ensure continued coherency;
- Common measures of progress and ability to change course if necessary.

=== Security Sector Reform (SSR) ===
Unity of effort is used to not conflict SSR programs with one another.
