= Homeland Security Presidential Directive 8 =

Homeland Security Presidential Directive (HSPD)-8, National Preparedness, describes the way United States Federal agencies will prepare for an incident. It requires Department of Homeland Security to coordinate with other Federal agencies and with State, local, and Tribal governments to develop a National Preparedness Goal with Emergency management. Congressional laws enacted, following the wake of 9/11, which resulted in new developments in the way security was assessed and addressed in the United States, to prevent and respond to threatened or actual domestic terrorist attacks, disasters, and other emergencies by requiring a national domestic all-hazards preparedness goal. HSPD 5, HSPD-7, HSPD-8, and HSPD-8 Annex 1 are directives that deal with the preparedness goals.

== HSPD-8 ==
The goal of HSPD-8, is the coordination and implementation of all-hazards preparedness in the United States, to help ensure the preparedness of the Nation to prevent, respond to, and recover from threatened and actual domestic terrorist attacks, major disasters, and other emergencies. The goal is to be attained by:

- a. Providing for the effective, efficient, and timely delivery of federal preparedness assistance to state and local governments; and
- b. Supporting efforts to ensure First responders are prepared to respond to major events, especially prevention of and response to threatened terrorist attacks. First responders can be civilians that are members of a United States national service program under the jurisdiction of the Department of Homeland Security, The National Office of Citizen Corp's (FEMA) Individual and Community Preparedness Division, Community emergency response team (CERT)

== Annex I ==
HSPD-8, Annex I, National Planning; describes a common Federal planning process that supports development of a family of related planning documents, known as the Integrated Planning System (IPS). The IPS concept provides the federal government with a consistent direction and delineation of authorities, responsibilities and requirements, common terms of reference, and plans based on shared assumptions.

== History ==
The domestic incident management plan is provided for from presidential directives HSPD-5 issued February 28, 2003, HSPD-7, HSPD-8, and HSPD-8 Annex 1, as a result of the Homeland Security Act of 2002. These directives set up the laws and regulations for managing domestic incidents by establishing the, comprehensive National Incident Management System (NIMS), and the National Response Framework (NRF). Both of these plans are augmented by the National Integration Center (NIC) and describes the way Federal departments and agencies will prepare for such a response, including prevention activities during the early stages of a terrorism incident.

National Security Presidential Directive 51, Homeland Security Presidential Directive 20 (NSPD-51/HSPD-20), and the National Continuity Policy, dated May 4, 2007, outline the continuity requirements for all Federal departments and agencies, with guidance for non-Federal organizations. These requirements include such things as essential functions, orders of succession, delegations of authority, continuity of operations, continuity of communications, vital records, and human capital. All of these rules and regulations for a national defense against any possible threat of national attack. HSPD-8 Annex 1 resulted in the Integrated Planning System (IPS) by using the Comprehensive Preparedness Guide 101 (CPG).

=== 9/11 ===
The attacks of September 11, 2001, brought about many changes in the country. An attack such as this had never before happened and steps had to be taken to ensure it didn't again.

==== Around the world ====
Many nations were affected by the attacks. Over 3000 lost their lives from the world including Australia, Bermuda, Canada, China, El Salvador, Germany, Grenada, Ireland, Israel, Japan, Sweden, United Kingdom, United States, and 30 that were listed as UNKNOWN.

== In the U.S. ==
Congress was swift to react and enacted laws to protect the United States with the Patriot Act, signed into law by President George W. Bush on October 26, 2001, and the Homeland Security Act of 2002 enacted November 25, 2002, as well as other laws for the protection of the country. This resulted in Presidential Directives, including HSPD-8, and HSPD-8 Annex 1, and formation of NIMS with offices in 10 locations.

== Offices ==
Region I: Boston

- Federal Emergency Management Agency
- 99 High Street
- Boston, MA 02110

Areas: Connecticut, Maine, Massachusetts, New Hampshire, Rhode Island, Vermont

NIMS Coordinator: Mike Brazel

Region II: New York

- Federal Emergency Management Agency
- 26 Federal Plaza, Room 1307
- New York, NY 10278-0002

Areas: New Jersey, New York, Puerto Rico, U.S. Virgin Islands

NIMS Coordinator: Marshall Mabry

Region III: Philadelphia

- Federal Emergency Management Agency
- One Independence Mall, 6th Floor
- 615 Chestnut Street
- Philadelphia, PA 10106-4404

Areas: Delaware, District of Columbia, Maryland, Pennsylvania, Virginia, West Virginia

NIMS Coordinator: John Brasko

Region IV: Atlanta

- Federal Emergency Management Agency
- Federal Regional Center
- 402 South Pinetree Boulevard
- Thomasville, GA 31792

Areas: Alabama, Florida, Georgia, Kentucky, Mississippi, North Carolina, South Carolina, Tennessee

NIMS Coordinator: Rupert Dennis

Region V: Chicago

- Federal Emergency Management Agency
- 536 S. Clark Street
- Chicago, IL 60605

Areas: Illinois, Indiana, Michigan, Minnesota Ohio, Wisconsin

NIMS Coordinator: Bill Sulinckas

Region VI: Denton

- Federal Emergency Management Agency
- Federal Regional Center
- 800 N. Loop 288
- Denton, TX 76209-3698

Areas: Arkansas, Louisiana, New Mexico, Oklahoma, Texas

NIMS Specialist: Sam Garland

NIMS Coordinator: Mike Goldsworthy

Region VII: Kansas City

- Federal Emergency Management Agency
- 9221 Ward Parkway, Suite 300
- Kansas City, MO 64114-3372

Areas: Iowa, Kansas, Missouri, Nebraska

NIMS Coordinator: Tom Morgan

Region VIII: Denver

- Federal Emergency Management Agency
- Denver Federal Center
- Building 710, Box 25267
- Denver, CO 80225-0267

Areas: Colorado, Montana, North Dakota, South Dakota, Utah, Wyoming

NIMS Coordinator: Lanney Holmes

Region IX: Oakland

- Federal Emergency Management Agency
- 1111 Broadway, Suite 1200
- Oakland, CA 94607-4052

Areas: American Samoa, Arizona, California, Guam, Hawaii, Nevada, Marianas Islands, Federated States of Micronesia Republic of the Marshall Islands

NIMS Coordinator: Susan Waller

Region X: Bothell

- Federal Emergency Management Agency
- Federal Regional Center
- 130 228th Street, S.W.
- Bothell, WA 98021-9796

Areas: Alaska, Idaho, Oregon, Washington

NIMS Coordinator: Matthew Bernard

== Current ==
With the November 2010 election results, and the Republicans taking a majority of the seats in the United States House of Representatives, there will be a move to stop what the Republicans consider a breach in national security and tighten laws such as immigration and border security. Existing White House defense and foreign policies will be under fire, such as a withdrawal of troops from Afghanistan, as well as nuclear reduction attempts. The end result will be strengthened Homeland Security enforcement in anticipation of any possible retaliations from the Taliban or Al Qaida.

On March 30, 2011, President Obama issued Presidential Policy Directive 8, which replaces Homeland Security Presidential Directive (HSPD) 8 - National Preparedness (issued Dec 17, 2003) and HSPD-8 Annex I - National Planning (issued December 4, 2007). The Obama directive places significant emphasis on an "all-of-nation" "all-hazards" approach to disasters, fusing together the capabilities of federal, state, and local authorities to respond to crises. It refocuses government resources on mitigation—preventing catastrophes from getting worse—and resilience—how communities actively respond to and recover from a major disaster.
