= Military Emergency Management Specialist Badge =

MEMS Badge
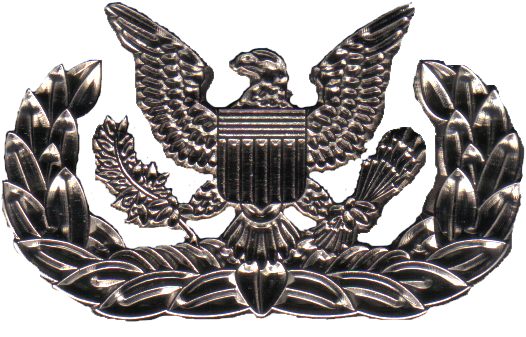
- Basic MEMS Badge
- Type: Skills Badge
- Awarded for: MEMS Training
- Presented by: SGAUS
- Eligibility: Federal Military & National Guard personnel (commanders discretion), State Defense Force personnel and current civilian members of SGAUS
- Status: Currently awarded
- Final award: Currently awarded

Highlights
- Total: Unknown

The Military Emergency Management Specialist Badge(s) (MEMS Badge) are earned through the State Guard Association of the United States (SGAUS) Military Emergency Management specialist Academy (MEMS Academy). The various skill badges are authorized for wear by various agencies, notably State Guard units and state defense forces. The MEMS Academy was founded by LTC (WA) George H. Heart, Ret. of the Washington State Guard in 1998. The academy curriculum and training program is structured around the Federal Emergency Management Agency's National Incident Management System (NIMS) and Incident Command System (ICS).

== Curriculum ==
The MEMS program curriculum includes online Federal Emergency Management Agency (FEMA) NIMS and ICS courses offered free of charge through FEMA's Emergency Management Institute's (EMI) Independent Study Program. In addition to online FEMA courses, students are required to complete operational practicums that incorporate the learning objectives of the online FEMA courses.

The MEMS Academy curricula are based on the idea of developing areas of common knowledge required at different levels of responsibility in emergency response and use accepted, validated courses available throughout the nation. The principle behind the several MEMS curricula is that individuals with Basic MEMS qualifications will have an operational understanding of the principles of emergency management, including mitigation, preparedness, emergency response, and recovery, and have knowledge, skills, and abilities needed to effectively work within a comprehensive emergency management operation. Those with Senior and Master level qualification will be able to lead and plan incident response efforts of increasing complexity.

== Requirements ==
Certification in the MEMS program consists of four levels: basic, senior, master, and liaison officer (LNO) all-hazards specialist, with traditional military-style skill badges awarded to students upon completion of each level. In addition to the badges, those students who participate in operational missions may be awarded a distinctive blue and gray flash, which is worn behind the badge. Participation in the MEMS program is free for current members of the SGAUS; however, nonmembers are required to pay a fee to defray program costs. Once awarded, the badge is permanent.

=== Basic ===
To qualify for the Basic MEMS Badge, an individual must meet the following requirements:

1. Complete select EMI courses.
2. Complete a basic MEMS practicum assigned by a proctor.
3. Complete a basic After Action Report (AAR) or narrative on the practicum option assigned.

=== Senior ===
To qualify for the Senior MEMS Badge, an individual must meet the following requirements:

1. Complete select EMI courses, in addition to those required for the Basic.
2. Complete the ICS 300 course.
3. Complete a senior MEMS practicum assigned by a proctor.
4. Complete a senior After Action Report (AAR) or narrative on the practicum option assigned.

=== Master ===
To qualify for the Master MEMS Badge, an individual must meet the following requirements:

1. Complete select EMI courses, in addition to those required for the Senior.
2. Applicants must have had the Senior MEMS Badge for at least six months.
3. Complete the ICS 400 course.
4. Applicants must have participated at a high level in the planning and execution of emergency plans, exercises, and emergency responses. (Experience in leadership of actual emergency activations may, on a case-by-case basis, be counted as partial fulfillment of the teaching requirement.)
5. Complete a master MEMS practicum assigned by a proctor.
6. Complete a master After Action Report (AAR) or narrative on the practicum option assigned.

== MEMS Command and Staff College ==
Discontinued MEMS Command and Staff College Unit Citation

For a short time, there was a MEMS Command and Staff College operated by the SGAUS. Students who successfully completed this program were awarded the MEMS Command and Staff College Unit Citation, the post-nominal designation of "MEMS" and "LM" (Legati MEMS - Militaris Subitis Procuratio Auctoritas) for MEMS Academy Staff and Faculty (lit. "Ambassadors") and an Emergency Management Maltese Cross and identification badge. The unit citation, the two post-nominal designations, badge and ID are no longer conferred.

== Design ==
The MEMS Badge was designed by the academy's founder and first Commandant (Emeritus), LTC (WA) George H. Heart, Ret., and depicts the historic United States Civil Defense eagle of World War II rampant on a bound laurel wreath, the ancient symbol for victory. The badge is authorized in basic, senior, and master levels. The Senior MEMS Badge has a five-pointed star added above the eagle. The Master MEMS Badge has a five-pointed star in a circular laurel wreath added above the eagle.

The MEMS skill badges are worn in accordance with applicable state military regulations. The badges are available in full-sized and miniature-sized silver, high-gloss metal finish, as well as in full-sized subdued black metal finish. For the older BDU's, there are full-sized subdued black or white on olive drab sew-on patches. For the ACU and OCP uniforms, there are full-sized subdued sew-on patches as well as subdued black metal badges available through the SGAUS store.

== See also ==
- Awards and decorations of the state defense forces
