= United States Continuity of Operations facilities =

US federal emergency management agency

Spread throughout various locations across the country, the United States' Continuity of Operations facilities coordinate the geographic dispersion of leadership, staff, and infrastructure in order to maintain the functions of the United States government in the event(s) that national security is compromised by a terrorist attack or natural disaster.

Some sites are run by the Federal Emergency Management Agency (FEMA), while others are run by the Department of Defense.

== Alphabet sites ==
- Site A: Department of Veterans Affairs Readiness Operations Center - Washington, D.C.
- Site B: Department of Veterans Affairs Medical Center - Martinsburg, West Virginia
- Site C: Department of Veterans Affairs Medical Center - Richmond, Virginia
  - Also provides microwave communications relay to Mount Weather and DoD Site C (Fort Ritchie, Maryland)
- Site E: Veterans Administration Medical Center - Bay Pines, Florida
- Site M: National Military Command Center (NMCC) - the Pentagon, Washington, D.C.
- Site R: Raven Rock - Sabillasville, Maryland

== Site R complex ==
- Site C: microwave communications relay on top of Quirauk Mountain
- Site Creed: Underground complex on west site of Site R
- Site RT: Raven Rock communications relay

== Presidential facilities ==
- White House - Washington, D.C.
- United States Naval Observatory - Washington, D.C.
- Camp David - near Thurmont, Maryland

== See also ==
- Continuity of government
- National Program Office (NPO)
- Post-Attack Command and Control System (PACCS)
- National Emergency Airborne Command Post (NEACP)
- National Military Command Center (NMCC)
- Alternate National Military Command Center (ANMCC)
- Mount Weather Emergency Operations Center
- Warrenton Training Center
