= Perl Design Patterns Book =

Perl Design Patterns Book is an online textbook about Perl style and design and analysis. The contents are licensed under GNU Free Documentation License.
