= National Response Plan =

The National Response Plan (NRP) was a United States national plan to respond to emergencies such as natural disasters or terrorist attacks. It came into effect in December 2004, and was superseded by the National Response Framework on March 22, 2008.

== Background ==
The federal government first actively engaged in emergency management by passing the Congressional Relief Act of 1803, which provided relief after a devastating fire in Portsmouth, New Hampshire. For about the next 150 years, the federal government took a reactive role in emergency response until passing the Federal Civil Defense Act of 1950.

No comprehensive plan for federal emergency response existed until 1979, when President Jimmy Carter signed an executive order creating the Federal Emergency Management Agency (FEMA). FEMA was first charged to absorb emergency response duties from multiple agencies with disjointed plans. In 1988 the Stafford Disaster Relief and Emergency Assistance Act became law. The Stafford Act established a system of federal assistance to state and local governments and required all states to prepare individual Emergency Operations Plans. Also, the Stafford Act authorized the Director of FEMA to prepare a Federal Response Plan (FRP). The FRP brought together multiple organizations to assist states with disaster preparedness and response and was augmented by the National Contingency Plan (NCP) through the Environmental Protection Agency (EPA). The NCP, in existence since 1968, was initially a blueprint for responding to oil spills, but was expanded to include hazardous materials in 1972 with the passing of the Clean Water Act. In 1980, the Comprehensive Environmental Response, Compensation and Liability Act, more commonly known as "Superfund," further expanded the scope of the NCP to include emergency removal actions at hazardous waste sites and required regulated facilities to submit contingency plans. The federal government helped state and local officials protect public health and the environment in the event of a hazardous material release or emergency through the NCP.

President Bill Clinton appointed James Lee Witt as the head of FEMA in 1992. Witt substantially changed FEMA to adopt an all-hazards approach to emergency planning. Clinton elevated Witt to a cabinet-level position, giving the Director access to the President.

In October 1994, the Stafford Act was amended to incorporate most of the former Civil Defense Act of 1950. In 1996 the Federal Radiological Emergency Response Plan (FRERP) was signed into law. The Nuclear Regulatory Commission (NRC) and FEMA prepared a plan outlining the federal government's response for peacetime radiological emergencies within the U.S. or its territories. These emergencies could occur at fixed nuclear facilities or during the transportation of radioactive materials, mishaps with nuclear weapons at military research facilities, satellites returning to earth, or terrorist attacks. By 1996, FEMA developed a guide for individual states to develop individual Emergency Operation Plans known as the Guide for All Hazards Emergency Operations Planning.

The Department of Homeland Security (DHS), which was formed following the September 11 attacks, absorbed FEMA when it was established in 2003.

== Implementation ==
The DHS administered the plan when in came into effect in December 2004. Within the United States, the responsibility for natural disaster planning and response follows a progression in which responsibility first falls on local governments. When a local government has exhausted its resources, it then requests specific additional resources from the county level. The request process then proceeds similarly from the county to the state to the federal government as additional resource needs are identified. In the event of a large-scale emergency, DHS assumes primary responsibility for ensuring that response professionals are prepared. This is intended to prevent the negative consequences of uncoordinated responses by local, state, and federal agencies during emergencies.

The plan was updated on May 25, 2006. The notice of change stated the update "emerged from organizational changes within DHS, as well as the experience of responding to Hurricanes Katrina, Wilma, and Rita in 2005."

On September 10, 2007, DHS released a draft copy of the National Response Framework as a replacement for the National Response Plan. The plan was replaced by the National Response Framework on March 22, 2008.

== Timelines ==
- August 30, 2005 – Secretary Michael Chertoff invoked the National Response Plan the day after Hurricane Katrina hit the Gulf Coast on the morning of August 29, 2005. By so doing, Chertoff assumed the leadership role triggered by the law to bear primary responsibility to manage the crisis. The invocation occurred due to the inability of local and state government to handle the situation.
- September 22, 2005 – In advance of the landfall of Hurricane Rita, Chertoff declared the storm an incident of national significance and put preparations in place in the gulf region of Texas.
