= National Strategy for Homeland Security =

Plans for US civil defense and counterterrorism; formal federal response to 9/11

The United States National Strategy for Homeland Security (NSHS) is a formal government response to the events of September 11, 2001 at the Pentagon and World Trade Center. The document issued by President George W. Bush outlines the overall strategic considerations for cooperation between the federal government, states, private enterprises, and ordinary citizens in anticipating future terrorism attacks as well as natural disasters and other incidents of national significance. The National Response Framework is the part of the homeland security national strategy that is a comprehensive emergency management guideline for implementing scalable responses to disasters and other incidents of national significance.

== Goals ==
The four primary goals of the National Strategy for Homeland Security are:

- Prevent and disrupt terrorist attacks;
- Protect the American people, our critical infrastructure, and key resources;
- Respond to and recover from incidents that do occur; and
- Continue to strengthen the foundation to ensure our long-term success.

The first three goals help to organize national efforts while the last goal entails creating and transforming homeland security principles, systems, structures, and institutions.

== Implementation ==
One of the first steps in implementing the strategy was the creation of the Department of Homeland Security.

According to the "Homeland Security and National Security" section of the national strategy document:

The Preamble to the Constitution defines our federal government's basic purposes as "... to form a more perfect Union, establish justice, insure domestic Tranquility, provide for the common defense, promote the general Welfare, and secure the Blessings of Liberty to ourselves and our Posterity." The requirement to provide for the common defense remains as fundamental today as it was when these words were written, more than two hundred years ago. The National Security Strategy of the United States aims to guarantee the sovereignty and independence of the United States, with our fundamental values and institutions intact. It provides a framework for creating and seizing opportunities that strengthen our security and prosperity. The National Strategy for Homeland Security complements the National Security Strategy of the United States by addressing a very specific and uniquely challenging threat – terrorism in the United States – and by providing a comprehensive framework for organizing the efforts of federal, state, local and private organizations whose primary functions are often unrelated to national security.

=== NIMS/ICS ===
Generally, the United States Federal Emergency Management Agency (FEMA) provides local guidance on implementing the National Incident Management System (NIMS) and Incident Command System (ICS) for local handling of emergency responses. As responses use up local resources, state and federal resources are mobilized under the National Response Framework, so that operational priorities are met during emergency responses of increasing size and complexity. All of these response activities are within the overall scope of the National Strategy for Homeland Security, whether emergency incidents are the result of terrorism or failure to respond may cause increased vulnerability to terrorism that may occur later.
