= National Response Framework =

Current incident management architecture of United States civil defense

The United States National Response Framework (NRF) is part of the National Strategy for Homeland Security that presents the guiding principles enabling all levels of domestic response partners to prepare for and provide a unified national response to disasters and emergencies. Building on the existing National Incident Management System (NIMS) as well as Incident Command System (ICS) standardization, the NRF's coordinating structures are always in effect for implementation at any level and at any time for local, state, and national emergency or disaster response.

== NRF authority ==
The NRF formally replaced the National Response Plan (NRP) on March 22, 2008, sixty days after its publication in the Federal Register. Until that time, the NRF served as information on the national intent for homeland security policy to replace the NRP on that date.

== NRF five key principles ==
Engaged partnership means that leaders at all levels collaborate to develop shared response goals and align capabilities. This collaboration is designed to prevent any level from being overwhelmed in times of crisis.

Tiered response refers to the efficient management of incidents, so that such incidents are handled at the lowest possible jurisdictional level and supported by additional capabilities only when needed.

Scalable, flexible, and adaptable operational capabilities are implemented as incidents change in size, scope, and complexity, so that the response to an incident or complex of incidents adapts to meet the requirements under ICS/NIMS management by objectives. The ICS/NIMS resources of various formally defined resource types are requested, assigned and deployed as needed, then demobilized when available and incident deployment is no longer necessary.

Unity of effort through unified command refers to the ICS/NIMS respect for each participating organization's chain of command with an emphasis on seamless coordination across jurisdictions in support of common objectives. This seamless coordination is guided by the "Plain English" communication protocol between ICS/NIMS command structures and assigned resources to coordinate response operations among multiple jurisdictions that may be joined at an incident complex.

Readiness to Act: "It is our collective duty to provide the best response possible. From individuals, households, and communities to local, tribal, State, and Federal governments, national response depends on our readiness to act."

== NRF core ==
The NRF consists of the core document and annexes. The NRF core covers:

- Roles and responsibilities at the individual, organizational and other private sector as well as local, state, and federal government levels
- Response actions
- Staffing and organization
- Planning and the National Preparedness Architecture
- NRF implementation, Resource Center, and other supporting documents incorporated by reference

== NRF annexes ==
=== NRF ESF Annexes ===
The NRF Emergency Support Function Annexes include the following enumerated protocols:

- ESF #1 - Transportation
- ESF #2 – Communications
- ESF #3 – Public Works and Engineering
- ESF #4 – Firefighting
- ESF #5 – Information and Planning
- ESF #6 – Mass Care, Emergency Assistance, Housing, and Human Services
- ESF #7 – Logistics Management and Resource Support
- ESF #8 – Public Health and Medical Services
- ESF #9 – Search and Rescue
- ESF #10 – Oil and Hazardous Materials Response
- ESF #11 – Agriculture and Natural Resources
- ESF #12 – Energy
- ESF #13 – Public Safety and Security
- ESF #14 – Cross-Sector Business and Infrastructure
- ESF #15 – External Affairs

=== NRF Support Annexes ===
The Support Annexes include:

- Critical Infrastructure and Key Resources (CIKR)
- Financial Management
- International Coordination
- Private-Sector Coordination
- Public Affairs
- Tribal Relations
- Volunteer and Donations Management
- Worker Safety and Health

=== NRF Incident Annexes ===
The Incident Annexes include:

- Incident Annex Introduction
- Biological Incident
- Catastrophic Incident
- Cyber Incident
- Food and Agriculture Incident
- Mass Evacuation Incident
- Nuclear/Radiological Incident
- Terrorism Incident Law Enforcement and Investigation

The Oil and Hazardous Materials Annex has been superseded by ESF #10

== Historical context ==
The NRF represents the American state of the art in the blueprint application of strategic staff planning that has at its roots the model of the Prussian General Staff in 1870, after which the United States Army adopted that form of staff organizational structure and function. This model includes dedicated doctrinal components for an institutional emphasis on leadership training at all organizational levels, combined with continuous historical analysis for acquiring generally understood strategic lessons.

In the specific instance of the NRF model for best-practice strategic staff planning under comprehensive emergency management (CEM) after Homeland Security Presidential Directives 5 and 8, the NRF incorporates military field components as directed by the President or released by the Secretary of Defense. In their parallel command structure to ICS/NIMS under national coordination, these military assets support the operations of ICS/NIMS civilian resources in a given incident scenario under management by objectives. Under the Secretary of Homeland Security, the NRF Resource Center exists a living system that can be revised and updated in a dynamic transparent fashion, where the online Resource Center will allow for ongoing revisions as necessary to reflect the continuous analysis of real-world events and the acquisition of CEM lessons subsequently learned.

== See also ==
- National Incident Management System,
