= Comprehensive emergency management =

Comprehensive emergency management, as defined in various laws throughout the United States, is the preparation for and the carrying out of all emergency functions, other than functions for which the military forces are primarily responsible, to mitigate, prepare for, respond to, and recover from emergencies and disasters, and to aid victims suffering from injury or damage, resulting from disasters caused by all hazards, whether natural, technological, or human caused, and to provide support for search and rescue operations for persons and property in distress.

Comprehensive emergency management is the philosophy that gave birth to the Federal Emergency Management Agency and the eventual decline of the term civil defense in the United States. Under Comprehensive Emergency Management, attention is given to the full range of emergencies from small weather incidents to the "ultimate emergency" of war. Its "all-hazards" philosophy stands in contrast to previous state and federal emergency management that focused solely on a massive nuclear war with the Soviet Union.

For any local or state jurisdiction, Comprehensive Emergency Management involves the creation of an emergency management plan, typically an Emergency Operations Plan that provides for the activation of an Incident Command System as a flexible central command structure for in-coming and committed resources that required to deal with all aspects of the incident as an emergency situation. Other command-level constructs include multiagency coordination and public information systems; overall, the federal command construct for Comprehensive Emergency Management is the National Incident Management System (NIMS).

== See also ==
- Civil defense
- Federal Emergency Management Agency
- United States Civil Defense
