= Coordinated Incident Management System =

Emergency response system in New Zealand

The New Zealand Co-ordinated Incident Management System (CIMS) is New Zealand's system for managing the response to an incident involving multiple responding agencies. Its developers based the system on the United States' Incident Command System (ICS) – developed in the 1970s – and on other countries' adaptations of ICS, such as Australia's Australasian Inter-Service Incident Management System (AIIMS).

The CIMS is intended as a generic framework, to be adapted for each situation by those involved in the response. For example, while there are four management functions, the incident itself determines the size of the incident management team. In an isolated incident, a single officer may perform all of functions; in a very complex incident each function could be sub-divided. Instead, CIMS emphasises consistent terminology, a single multi-agency Incident Control Point for each site or, where possible, wider incident, and planning tools across all agencies. For example, the term "Assembly Area" means the same thing in every incident – although there may well be several Assembly Areas in more complex incidents. Likewise, all trained responders know the roles and responsibilities of the Logistics Manager.

CIMS was initially designed in the late 1990s to be applied to all levels of emergency response management, similar to the USA National Incident Management System (NIMS) and to the UK's Gold Silver Bronze command system, however the original CIMS manual clearly articulated only the incident/site level of response co-ordination.

CIMS was fully reviewed in 2014 subsequent to the 2010–2011 Canterbury earthquakes, the 2010 Pike River Mine disaster, and the 2011 MV Rena grounding. The revised 2014 manual incorporates higher levels of incident and emergency-response co-ordination, consistent with the arrangements and responsibilities outlined in the National Civil Defence Emergency Management Plan (the National CDEM Plan). In some senses, the National CDEM Plan resembles the United States Department of Homeland Security's National Response Framework.

As of 2016 the revised approach to CIMS puts more emphasis on management and co-ordination processes, such as the internationally standard intelligence cycle and a more mature planning process, than it does on co-ordination structures, as such.

A distinguishing factor from other English-speaking systems is the use of the term control rather than command, as in the title "Incident Controller" for "Incident Commander". By implication, this was designed to emphasise that the incident management team is primarily a focused on co-ordinating the response by independent agencies, rather than ordering responders in a militaristic manner. This is complicated to a degree, as the person in charge of the operations function, usually an Operations Manager, does have the authority to command agencies to act.

== Background concepts ==
CIMS is based around several background concepts that provide the basis for the operational elements.

=== Vision and mission ===
CIMS aims to deliver:

Vision: Safer communities through integrated emergency management.

Mission: CIMS will create a legacy of safer communities through a proved, reliable, user-friendly, effective and efficient up-to-date [incident management] system. The system will be fully integrated and flexible and have the confidence of the public.

=== Principles ===
Common structures, roles and responsibilities

Common structures, roles, and responsibilities make it possible for agencies to work effectively alongside each other, and for personnel to interchange roles. They facilitate information flow and understanding by creating parallel structures and appointments.

Common terminology

Common terminology is essential in incident management, especially for multi-agency responses. When agencies have slightly different meanings for terms, confusion and inefficiency can result. Common terminology for functions, processes, and facilities prevents this, improves communications between organisations, and allows faster and more effective responses.

Modular and scalable

The modular and scalable CIMS structure is flexible and can be applied to all responses and to all levels within a response. Agencies may adapt their response structures prior to a response to suit their specific needs, and during a response to reflect changing circumstances. In the context of CIMS, modular organisation primarily means that the management structure can expand and contract depending on the nature of the incident or series of incidents that the agencies are responsible for. This means that at small, isolated incidents a single person may be in charge. At large, complex incidents, such as a major weather event, there will be multiple incident management teams co-ordinated by an overall emergency operations centre (EOC). Local or agency EOCs will be supported and co-ordinated by a regional-level emergency co-ordination centre (ECC) when the incident is of sufficient scale or complexity. This modular model primarily contrasts with developing pre-defined structures. The focus is on maintaining flexibility to each incident as it arises, rather than rote learning specific structures for every type of incident. Modular organisation also means that incident facilities can be established and removed as the incident develops.

Responsive to community needs

All responses aim to mitigate and manage the consequences for the affected community. This requires response personnel to effectively communicate with communities, understand their needs, and base their response and recovery actions on these needs. Communities will actively participate in a response rather than wait passively for assistance. Community response actions need to be co-ordinated with the official response.

Integrated response co-ordination

Integrated response co-ordination is the organisation of the responding agencies into a single, cohesive response. Consolidated action planning is a key component of integrated response co-ordination, as are resource co-ordination, and integrated information management and communications

Consolidated incident action planning

Action Plans describe response objectives, agency and team tasks, and the measures needed to co-ordinate the response. They are proactive, seeking to pre-empt hazards where possible, and to resolve the situation as quickly as possible. A multi-agency Action Plan must have input from all support agencies to be effective.

Integrated information management and communication

Integrated information management and communications enable effective information sharing, supporting more effective action planning and response co-ordination, as well as wider situational awareness. It aims to establish a common operating picture (an understanding of the situation based on the best available information, shared between all response agencies), and requires a common communications plan, standard procedures, clear text, common communication means, and common terminology.

Resource co-ordination

Resource co-ordination organises resources across all response agencies. Agencies inform each other of their available capabilities and resources so that procurement and use of resources can be managed efficiently. Lead agencies monitor resource information, and may set priorities for allocating critical resources. This consolidates control of resources, maximises resource use, provides accountability, and improves situational awareness.

Designated response facilities

Designated response facilities with clearly defined functions assist in effective incident management.

Manageable span of control

Span of control is the number of direct reports any one person can effectively manage, 1:5 being best practice and 1:3 being the optimum for tactical command roles.

=== Supporting intentions ===
In addition to the principles there are three supporting intentions:

Common training standards and accreditation

Common training standards, supported by accreditation, help to ensure that personnel in key positions have the requisite skills and experience to perform their roles, and to provide equivalence between organisations. Common training enhances personal relationships between agency personnel and may provide economies of scale.

Regular review

Regular review of CIMS ensures its effectiveness and relevance. Lessons are only learned when doctrine is amended and training is updated to reflect the new information.

International compatibility

Maintaining international compatibility ensures that New Zealand agencies and personnel are able to operate effectively with overseas organisations and personnel, and enables New Zealand response agencies to more easily analyse and incorporate lessons from overseas experience.

=== Command, control and co-ordination ===
The terms command, control and co-ordination play a big role within CIMS. These terms help define the roles and responsibilities between incident managers that may direct responders from multiple organisations and line managers who act within a single agency. Control operates horizontally between agencies, whereas Command operates vertically within an agency. Co-ordination describes the overall cohesion of agencies working together with defined responsibilities.

=== Lead agencies, support agencies and unified control ===
==== Lead agency ====
A lead agency is the agency with a mandate to manage the response to an incident through legislation, under protocols, by agreement, or because it has the expertise and experience. The lead agency establishes control to co-ordinate the response of all agencies involved.

The lead agency may change between risk reduction, readiness, response, and recovery. It may also change as the incident progresses, if the required authority or expertise changes. When the lead agency cannot be readily identified, response agencies may adopt a joint 'Unified Control' structure (see below).

Some general examples of lead agencies:

General Examples of Lead Agencies at Incidents
Incident Type	Lead Agency	Basis
Earthquake	National Emergency Management Agency	Civil Defence Emergency Management Act 2002
Animal and plant pests and diseases (biosecurity)	Ministry for Primary Industries	Biosecurity Act 1993, Hazardous Substances and New Organisms Act 1996
Infectious human disease (pandemic)	Ministry of Health	Epidemic Preparedness Act 2006, Heath Act 1956
Urban fire	Fire and Emergency New Zealand	Fire and Emergency New Zealand Act 2017
Terrorism	New Zealand Police	Crimes Act 1961, International Terrorism (Emergency Powers) Act 1987, Terrorism Suppression Act 2002
Marine oil spill	Maritime New Zealand	Maritime Transport Act 1994

==== Support agencies ====
A support agency is an agency that provides support to the lead agency in a response. The lead agency tasks and co-ordinates support agencies’ resources and actions. The type of incident determines which support agencies are involved, and these agencies may change as the response progresses. While an agency may have the lead for a particular response, support agencies often have statutory responsibilities and specific objectives of their own, which the lead agency needs to accommodate. The lead agency is responsible for ensuring arrangements and plans are in place prior to incidents where they will have the lead. Support agencies are responsible for assisting in the development of these. Integration of support agencies into the response is a fundamental responsibility of lead agencies.

==== Unified control ====
Unified Control is when the control of an incident is shared between two or more agencies by agreement through a combined decision-making body. The command appointments for each agency establish an agreed concept of operations and a single Action Plan. Unified Control is usually applied when:

- more than one agency has a mandate to manage a particular incident
- it is unclear if any agency is the lead, or
- the lead agency determines that a joint approach will be more effective.

Agencies applying Unified Control establish a joint co-ordination centre (CC), with key appointments filled by the most appropriate personnel from any agency. Agency command appointments do not have to be present at all times, but need to come together to agree on key decisions.

Other than a combined Control function, the joint CC follows usual CIMS practices.

=== Response co-ordination functions ===
==== Control ====
Control is responsible for the overall incident progression, and is performed by the lead agency. The Incident Controller (IC) has overall accountability for the incident. The IC has three main responsibilities:

- Safety
- Incident stability, meaning to implement the strategy that will be the most effective at resolving the incident while maintaining economical use of resources. This strategy is issued through the use of Action Plans (APs).
- Property conservation, which relates to minimising damage generally.

==== Operations ====
The Operations function oversees delivery of the Action Plan, which means making sure that responders are being as productive as possible. Operations is generally responsible for operational command of resources, in order to fulfil the objectives set by the IC. This means allocating agencies specific functions in their areas of expertise, monitoring their performance, and providing a communication link between the responders and the other elements of the IMT, especially Logistics.

==== Planning and intelligence ====
The Planning and Intelligence functions are responsible for forecasting the incident development, anticipating likely needs and drafting the Action Plan. This role is strategic in scope. "This incident will go on for another 12 hours, we will need lighting, food and shelter for the expected rain".

==== Logistics ====
The Logistics function ensures that the operation can continue by ensuring that there are sufficient resources on-site and related functions.

=== Response co-ordination tools ===
Intelligence Cycle

Planning Process

SitRep (Situation Report)

The SitRep is a report from responders as to what is happening now. This information is gathered by the Incident Management Team (IMT) to develop the Action Plan (AP).

Action Plan

The Action Plan (AP) is a template for ensuring that the IMT and all agencies involved in the response have a consistent approach to the incident. It is the single plan that all agencies and responders work to.

Resource Request

Task Plan

Incident Report

== History ==
=== Pre-1990s ===
Despite having had a national fire service since 1976, and a national police force since the late 19th Century, there was no consistency in the management of the response to emergencies. Each agency had its own communication system, jargon, hierarchy and attitude towards a particular type of emergency.

Development of CIMS was also indirectly influenced by a major review of New Zealand's emergency services, which took place in the mid-1990s. This review recommended that agencies should look at working closer together, in order to provide a more integrated service to New Zealand communities.

=== Example of issue ===
Road-vehicle crashes that do not involve fire show how confusion could arise. The Fire Service Act 1975 grants authority to the New Zealand Fire Service for fires, as well as all other emergencies where it feels it can render assistance. The Police, however, have a common-law duty to protect life and property, as well as statutory enforcement authority of transport legislation. Likewise, the local ambulance service may feel it has primary responsibility, because it is responsible for the well-being of anyone injured by the incident. With each agency thinking that it is in charge, effective co-ordination may become difficult.

=== 1996: CIMS conceived ===
In 1996, the New Zealand Fire Service began to promote the idea of implementing an incident management system that was common across all emergency response and management agencies. In March 1997, a workshop of 25 representatives from the New Zealand Police, New Zealand Fire Service, the National Rural Fire Authority, New Zealand Ambulance Board, Civil Defence, local government, New Zealand Defence Force, New Zealand Forest Owners Association and the Department of Conservation was held.

This initial workshop developed the vision, mission and project scope. Since then, the system, nationwide training using consistent training materials and the system's implementation have been carried out.

=== 1998: System developed ===
==== Nationally consistent training ====
By 1998, much of the system was developed. Two levels of training were decided upon, at awareness and practitioner levels. Training was develivered through the NZQA's National Qualifications Framework, with the Fire & Rescue Services Industry Training Organisation (FRISTO) nominated as the Standards Setting Body and holding authority for national moderation.

One unique element of CIMS, is that the practitioner level programmes must be delivered in a multi-agency environment.

==== Co-ordination between the emergency services ====
As well as training individual responders, a wider level of co-ordination between the emergency services was required in order for New Zealand's emergency services to develop towards the model of comprehensive emergency management, as envisaged by the 1995 civil defence emergency management review. During the late 1990s, territorial authorities aligned to form Emergency Management Groups (now known as Civil Defence Emergency Management Groups), in anticipation of legislative change promoting a move away from purely response-focused planning.

In addition to efforts by local government, Emergency Services Coordination Committees were established to enhance operational effectiveness, clarify local capabilities and establish lead agencies for circumstances where statutory authority was unclear, as in the example above. Two examples of committees that remain in existence include those in the Counties-Manukau and Central Hawkes Bay areas.

=== CIMS reviewed 2014 ===
The second edition of CIMS builds on the first by incorporating experience gained since 1998. In particular, it reflects the lessons identified from the responses to a number of large-scale and complex emergencies that occurred in New Zealand from 2010 to 2012. These emergencies emphasised the importance of CIMS, but also subjected the system to new levels of examination, and identified areas where it needs strengthening. Accordingly, this edition of CIMS also gives effect to recommendations from formal reviews and inquiries into those emergency responses, including:

- The Royal Commission on the Pike River Coal Mine Tragedy
- The Independent Review of the Civil Defence Emergency Management Response to the 22 February 2011 Christchurch Earthquake
- The Canterbury Earthquakes Royal Commission
- The Independent Review of Maritime New Zealand's Response to the MV Rena Incident on 5 October 2011; and
- The CTV Building Coronial Inquest (22 February 2011 Christchurch earthquake)

This revised CIMS establishes a modular and scalable framework for consistent response at any level – from a small, single agency response to a larger, multi-agency response that may require co-ordination at the community or incident level or higher. CIMS enables agencies to plan for, train and conduct responses in a consistent manner, without being prescriptive. With this approach CIMS is an essential tool in New Zealand's preparedness to effectively respond to emergencies.

== Current use ==
=== CIMS using organisations ===
CIMS is to be used by all emergency services, government agencies and management agencies, including those agencies involved in the 2012–2014 review:

- Ambulance New Zealand (Hato Hone St John; Wellington Free Ambulance)
- Department of Conservation
- Department of the Prime Minister and Cabinet
- Maritime New Zealand
- Ministry for Primary Industries
- Ministry of Civil Defence & Emergency Management
- Ministry of Health
- Ministry of Social Development
- New Zealand Customs Service
- New Zealand Defence Force
- Fire and Emergency New Zealand
- New Zealand Police
- Ministry of Business, Innovation and Employment participated in 2013 for the purpose of developing an Underground Mines Emergency Protocol

=== Wider adoption ===
==== Business continuity/crisis management ====
In recent years, CIMS has also been recognised as best practice for implementing management structures for response and recovery. Many organisations outside those identified above are now adopting CIMS – including lifeline utilities, universities, and businesses. The key benefits are adopting a recognised standard, and being able to interoperate with other agencies during response to complex events that involve more than one agency.

==== Land search and rescue ====
New Zealand Land Search and Rescue Inc (LandSAR) has widely adopted the use of CIMS.

== Access to CIMS training and education ==
Training is provided by a number of public sector, commercial organisations and NZQA private training establishments. CIMS 2 is widely available from a number of vendors. CIMS 4 can only be delivered as a multi-agency course – usually led in rotation by Police, Fire, Ambulance or the local Civil Defence Emergency Management (CDEM) authority. For more information, contact your local Civil Defence Emergency Management authority for more information.

CIMS training is registered on the National Qualifications Framework, run by the New Zealand Qualifications Authority.

- NZQA Unit Standard 17279 (Level 2, 2 Credits) – Demonstrate knowledge of the co-ordinated incident management system (CIMS).
- NZQA Unit Standard 22445 (Level 4, 4 Credits) – Describe the roles and functions of a CIMS Incident Management Team (IMT) at an incident.

More in-depth study into concepts of Incident Management is available from Massey University in a third-year paper on Incident Command Systems 130301.
