= Hospital incident command system (US) =

In the United States, the hospital incident command system (HICS) is an incident command system (ICS) designed for hospitals and intended for use in both emergency and non-emergency situations. It provides hospitals of all sizes with tools needed to advance their emergency preparedness and response capability—both individually and as members of the broader response community.

== Introduction ==
HICS is based upon the hospital emergency incident command system (HEICS), which was created in the late 1980s as an important foundation for the 5,815 registered hospitals in the United States in their efforts to prepare for and respond to various types of disasters. In developing the fourth edition of HEICS, the value and importance of using an incident management system to assist as well with daily operations, preplanned events, and non-emergency situations became apparent. Thus, the HICS was created as a system for use in both emergency and non-emergency situations, such as moving the facility, dispensing medications to hospital staff, or planning for a large hospital or community event.

HICS was developed by a national work group of twenty hospital subject-matter experts from across the United States. In addition to the contributions of the national work group, ex officio members were included to ensure consistency with governmental, industrial, and hospital accreditation planning efforts and requirements.

== Overview of ICS principles ==
An ICS is designed to:

- Be usable for managing all routine or planned events, of any size or type, by establishing a clear chain of command
- Allow personnel from different agencies or departments to be integrated into a common structure that can effectively address issues and delegate responsibilities
- Provide needed logistical and administrative support to operational personnel
- Ensure key functions are covered and eliminate duplication

The incident planning process takes place regardless of the incident size or complexity. This planning involves six essential steps:

- Understanding the hospital's policy and direction
- Assessing the situation
- Establishing incident objectives
- Determining appropriate strategies to achieve the objectives
- Giving tactical direction and ensuring that it is followed (e.g., correct resources assigned to complete a task and their performance monitored)
- Providing necessary back-up (assigning more or fewer resources, changing tactics, et al.)

== NIMS compliance for hospitals ==
The Homeland Security Presidential Directive-5 (HSPD-5), issued by president George W. Bush in February 2003, created the National Incident Management System (NIMS). Until NIMS, there had been no standard for domestic incident response that united all levels of government and all emergency response agencies. The NIMS is designed to provide a framework for interoperability and compatibility among the various members of the response community. The end result is a flexible framework that facilitates governmental and nongovernmental agencies working together at all levels during all phases of an incident, regardless of its size, complexity, or location.

== Hospital emergency management program ==
The emergency operations plan (EOP) outlines the hospital's strategy for responding to and recovering from a realized threat or hazard or other incident. The document is intended to provide overall direction and coordination of the response structure and processes to be used by the hospital. An effective EOP lays the groundwork for implementation of the incident command system and the needed communication and coordination between operating groups. The essence of the process includes the following steps:

- Designating an emergency program manager program
- Establishing the emergency management committee
- Developing the “all hazards ” emergency operations plan
- Conducting a hazard vulnerability analysis
- Developing incident-specific guidance (Incident Planning Guides)
- Coordinating with external entities
- Training key staff
- Exercising the EOP and incident-specific guidance through an exercise program
- Conducting program review and evaluation
- Learning from the lessons that are identified (organizational learning)

== The HICS ==
HICS incident management team charts depict the hospital command functions that have been identified and represent how authority and responsibility are distributed within the incident management team. In the 2014 HICS Guidebook, the term "incident management team" was changed to "hospital incident management team" or "HIMT", in order to eliminate any potential for confusion with other response agencies that may be deployed to aid in managing the incident. The following link provides the most updated HIMT organizational chart.

The activities at the hospital command center (HCC) are directed by the incident commander, who has overall responsibility for all activities within the HCC. The incident commander may appoint other command staff personnel to assist.

Many incidents that likely will occur involve injured or ill patients. The operations section will be responsible for managing the tactical objectives outlined by the incident commander. Branches of this section include: department level, patient care, infrastructure, business continuity, security, and HazMat.

The planning section will "collect, evaluate, and disseminate incident situation information and intelligence to Incident command" and includes a Resources Unit, Situation Unit, Documentation Unit, and Demobilization Unit. Support requirements will be coordinated by the Logistics Section, and the Finance/Administration account for the costs associated with the response.

Also, several additional incident command principles and practices are covered in this section, including incident command staff identification, building incident command staff depth, job action sheets, and incident response guides.

Example HICS Structure:

- Incident commander – administrator-in-charge, (may re-delegate position, and provide control of the command center (CC)).
  - Public information officer – provides official information to media.
  - Liaison officer – connects to external agencies in response efforts.
  - Safety officer – Identifies hospital threats and takes steps to ensure continued safety of the facility, employees, and patients.
  - Medical/technical specialist – i.e. CDC doctor.
  - Operations chief – (Organize and direct essential activities given by the CC and facilitate proper hospital staffing).
    - Staging manager
    - Medical care branch director
    - Infrastructure branch director
    - HAZMAT branch director
    - Security branch director
    - Business continuity branch director
    - Patient family assistance branch director (added in the 2014 version)
  - Planning chief – (develops action plan for operations sustainment in 4-, 8-, 24-, and 48-hour increments after the disaster incident).
    - Resources unit leader
    - Situation unit leader
    - Documentation unit leader
    - Demobilization unit leader
  - Logistics chief – (direct maintenance and supply operations to ensure patient care, supplies, equipment, and utilities for essential hospital functions).
    - Service branch director
    - Support branch director
  - Finance chief – (track expenditures for repayment and special purchases).
    - Time unit leader
    - Procurement unit leader
    - Compensation/claims unit leader
    - Cost unit leader

In emergency situations, the incident commander has the ability to waive certain policies and procedures in order to assure that immediate assistance is rendered to all patients coming into the hospital. This allows the hospital to handle a surge in patients and render life-saving care to the greatest number of patients.

FEMA, (2004). University of Kentucky hospital emergency management plan. Retrieved January 27, 2013, from – Lab 10 – Handout 10-14-U of KY Hosp EMP.pdf

== Life-cycle of an incident ==
The life-cycle of an incident includes the following steps:

- Alert and notification
- Situation assessment and monitoring
- EOP implementation
- Establishing the HCC
- Building the ICS structure
- Incident action planning
- Communications and coordination
- Staff health and safety
- Operational considerations
- Legal and ethical considerations
- Demobilization
- System recovery
- Response evaluation and organizational learning
