= Emergency management in Australia =

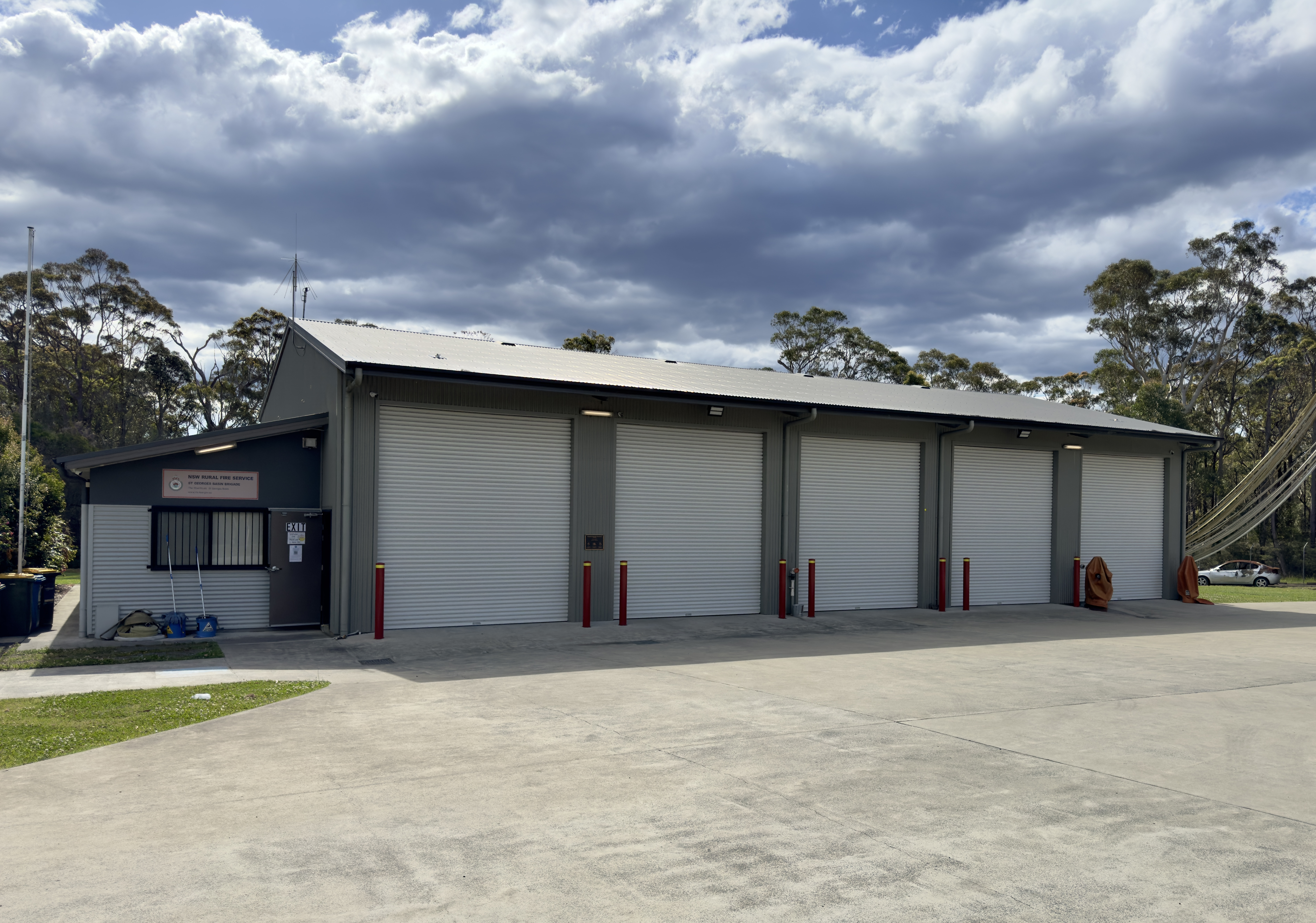
The New South Wales Rural Fire Service station in St Georges Basin. Similar facilities are located in many towns across Australia, as well as the outer suburbs of major cities, and house the equipment and facilities used by volunteer firefighters.

Emergency Management in Australia is a shared responsibility between the Government appointed body Emergency Management Australia and local councils.

== Need ==
Natural disasters are part of life in Australia. Drought occurs on average every 3 out of 10 years and associated heatwaves have killed more Australians than any other type of natural disaster in the 20th century. Flooding is historically the most costly disaster with average losses estimated at $400 Million a year. It's worth noting that the flood of 1990 covered an area larger than Germany.

== History ==
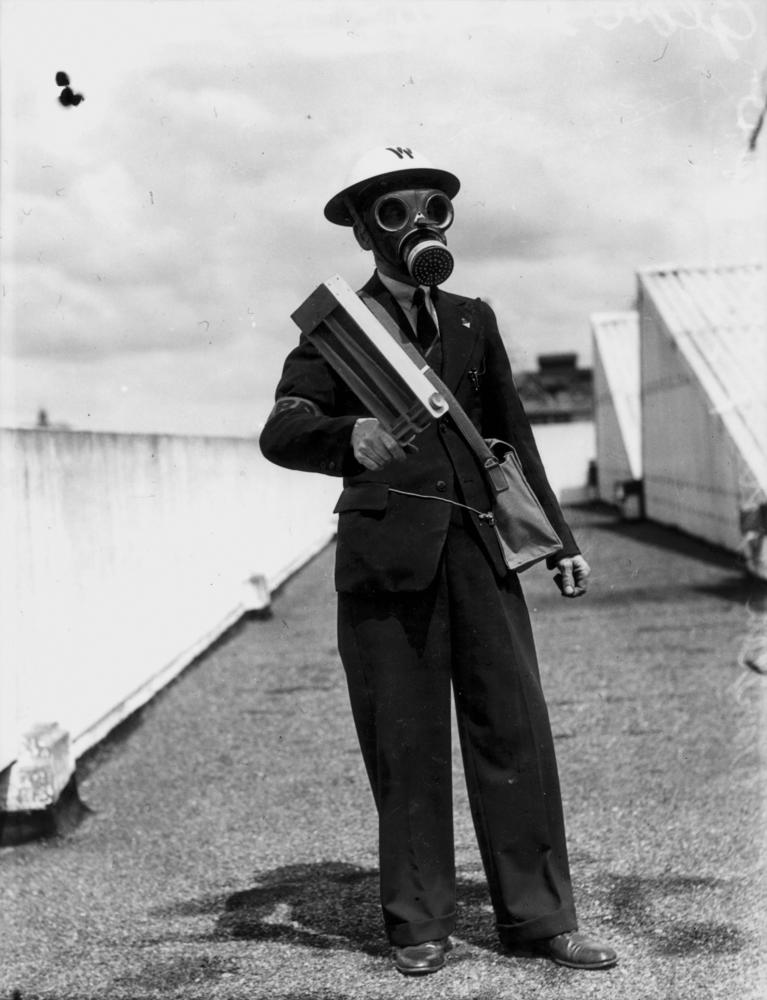
An air raid warden in Brisbane during 1942

Prior to the late 1930s disaster affected communities made do as best they could but in 1938 Australia followed the United Kingdom in establishing an Air Raid Precautions (ARP) Organisation. This was done in response to Giulio Douhet’s theories on aerial warfare that “the bombers will always get through”.

ARP duties included policing blackouts, fire guard messengers, emergency first response until relieved by the emergency and rescue services, as they were trained in basic fire fighting and first aid. They also helped bombed out house holders and assisted the police with crowd control. The Federal Government held the view that the Constitution of Australia gave it the authority to wage war in defence of the nation but the responsibility for the civil protection measures in time of war belonged to its constituent states.

After the Second World War the ARP was substantially reduced but by 1948 public protection issues had again reappeared, centred on the Cold War and the threat posed by nuclear weapons. By 1954 the ARP was disbanded and the State, Territory and Federal Governments agreed to a new rejuvenated “Civil Defence” organisation, with the Federal government providing a supporting role.

During the 1950s and 1960s the Australian community experienced a number of natural disasters and manmade crises. As a public safety asset, these state based Civil Defence organisations were regularly but not always called upon to assist. This changed on 7 February 1967 when the Black Tuesday bushfires swept through the City of Hobart with devastating consequences. The Civil Defence teams had been called out and responded well. The 1967 Tasmanian fires were a seminal point in the development of structured emergency management in Australia. During the early 1970s each state progressively remodelled their Civil Defence organisations to realign their focus away from the protection of the community in wartime to protection of the community in times of disaster. This transformation was also reflected in a name change from Civil Defence to State Emergency Service (SES). In 1974, the Federal Government established the Natural Disaster Organisation (NDO) within the Department of Defence. This was a support organisation only able to provide a coordination and training role. It did not control the state organisations, manage the response or own the resources required to respond effectively to a crisis.

In January 1993 the NDO was relaunched as Emergency Management Australia (EMA). To recognise the civil, community protection basis it was also transferred from the Department of Defence to the Attorney General's Department.

== EMA ==
EMA is the peak body charged with reducing the impact of natural and non-natural disasters in Australia. These are defined as;

=== Natural ===
1. Meteorological - Drought, heatwaves, bushfires, storms, cyclones and tornadoes.
2. Geological - Earthquake, landslides and volcanoes.
3. Biological - Human diseases pandemics, vermin, insect and animal plagues exotic animal diseases foot and mouth disease, anthrax, food crop diseases.
4. Extraterrestrial - Asteroids and meteorites.

=== Nonnatural ===
1. Human caused - Major crime, terrorism, error, riot crowd crushes, shooting massacres.
2. Technological - Transport, mining, hazardous material, explosions, urban fire, bridge collapse, dam failure, nuclear accidents, and space junk impact.

== Risk management ==
In 1995 AS NZS 4360:1995, a standard on risk management was produced (since replaced by AS NZS 31000: 2009). The following year EMA recommended to the State Governments that risk management principles now be applied to natural emergency management principles and practises. EMA maintains national level disaster plans for Australia and the South West Pacific but with its limited authority, still only enhances the capabilities of the States and Territories through support, coordination, training and the provision of extra resources when requested. This role has recently been expanded to address the risk of terrorism, climate change, pandemics and the increasing need to provide international crisis assistance. The latter is co-opted through AusAID which is part of the Department of Foreign Affairs and Trade. Currently, EMA consists of 4 branches as follows;

1. Security Coordination Branch
2. Crisis Coordination Branch
3. Crisis Support Branch
4. Natural Disaster Recovery Program Branch.

== States and territories ==
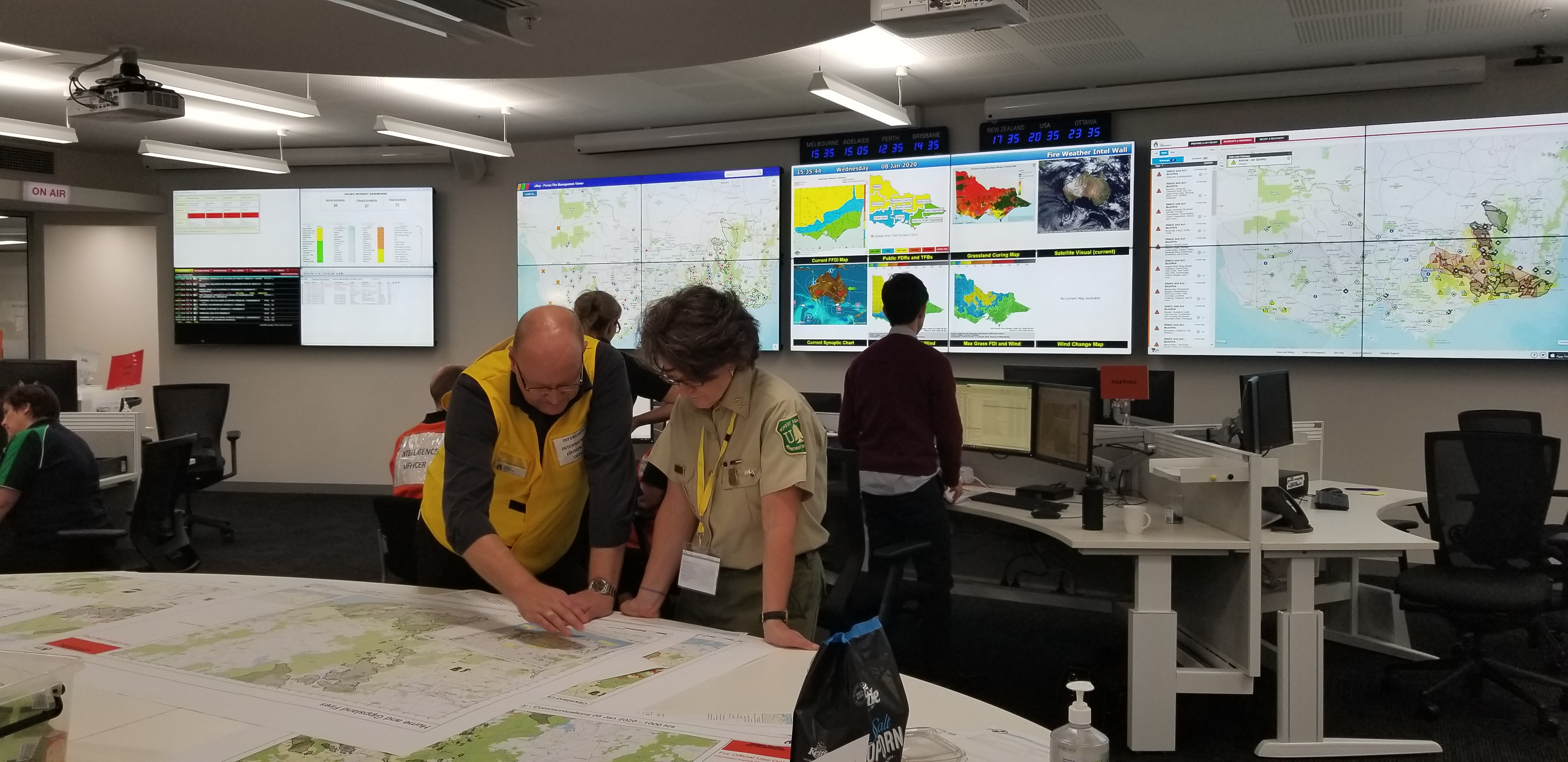
People working inside the State Control Centre in Victoria

EMA operates within a climate of cooperative and constructive dialogue with the States and Territories who operate their own Disaster Acts. There is no federal emergency management legislation. The State and Territory Disaster Acts are administered in most cases by their individual Ministers for Emergency Services who control the peak government agency charged with emergency management at State or Territory level. As each State faces different risks (i.e. fires in the south and floods in the north) their crisis response and management arrangements contain subtle differences. In Queensland the state is divided into 23 District Disaster Management Groups (DDMG) who liaise with EMQ. Its membership is made up of District Police Commanders, regional government departments, government owned corporations, and NGO's. It offers a middle management interface by providing State government assistance, when requested by Local Disaster Management Groups (LDMG).

=== Victoria ===
Those emergency risks of high consequence in order of likelihood in Victoria, Australia are bushfire, flood, pandemic influenza, transport infrastructure emergency, electricity supply disruption then hazardous materials incident. Earthquakes, plant or animal disease outbreaks and liquid fuel storage are not considered risks of much consequence by the Government of Victoria

== Local government ==
A fundamental concept in Australia's emergency management philosophy is sustainability and resilience at a local level. In the state of Queensland, each local Shire, Town, or City Council fund their own community based, volunteer staffed, SES units that report to the peak body which is Emergency Management Queensland (EMQ). There are 73 units in total and each is made up of a single or multiple sub groups, depending on the size of the municipal authority. At this level, LDMG's are established and chaired by the Mayor or other senior elected member of the council.

== State Emergency Service ==
There are a total of 339 SES groups in Queensland. Each group is managed by a Group Leader, qualified in emergency management and its volunteer members are equipped, uniformed, trained and led to a common standard recommended by EMA and enforced by the authority of EMQ. These groups maintain interoperability with each other and interstate SES groups.

== Concepts and principles ==
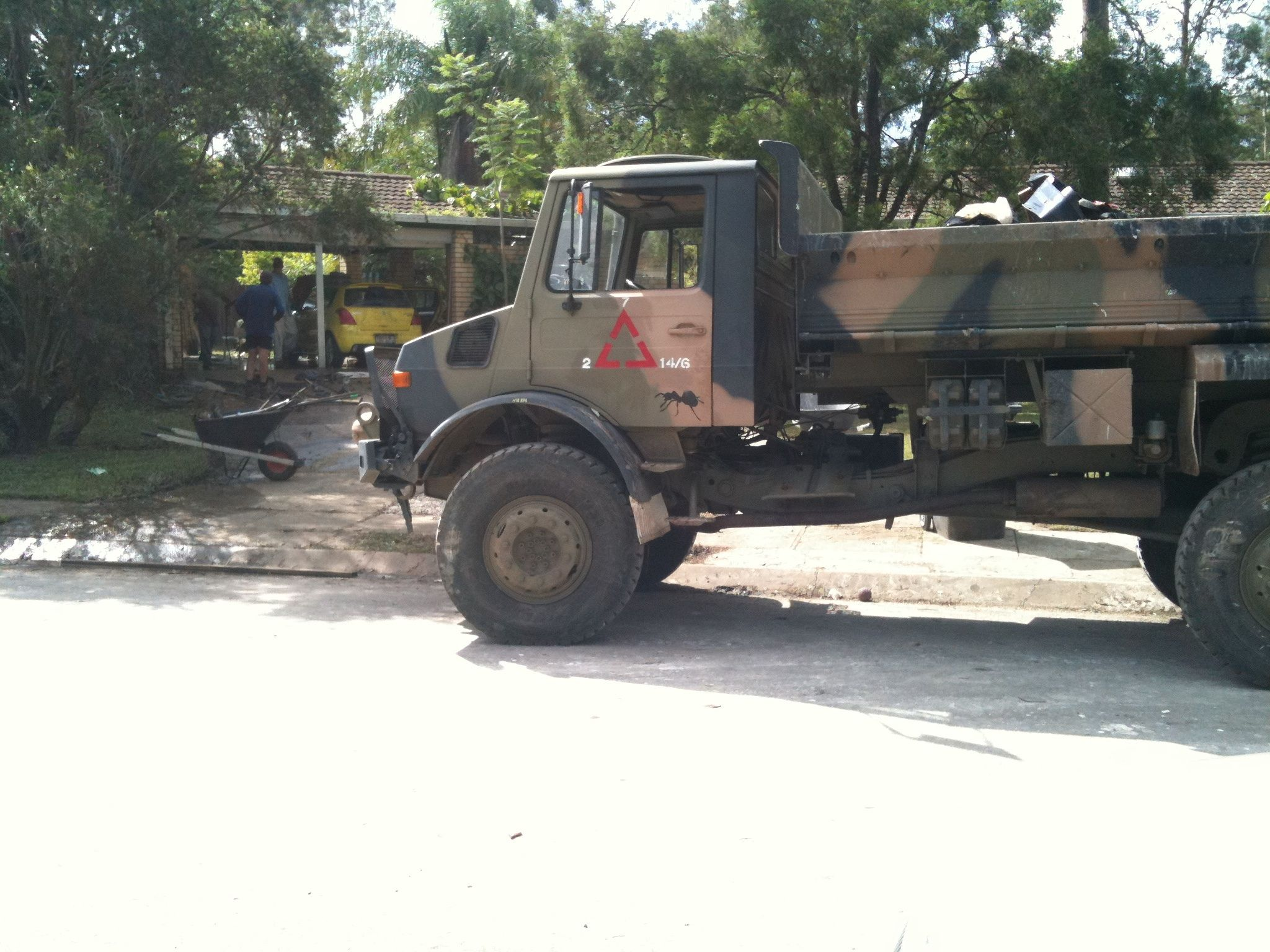
An Australian Army truck being used in the clean up of a Brisbane suburb during the 2010–2011 Queensland floods

Australia's emergency management processes are focused on the concept of the prepared community. This is achieved through the application of the following;

1. The Australasian Inter-Service Incident Management System (AIIMS.) This is an incident command system that is robust, scalable and applicable to all manner of crises. The successful management of disasters is achieved by having various divisions (Incident Controller, Logistics, Operations, Planning, Intelligence and Public Information) with appointed leaders responsible for handling specific aspects associated with the crises, reporting to a single Incident Controller. This system may be used for the effective coordination of resources in response to any incident or event.
2. Comprehensive Approach. This includes the emergency management phases of Preparation, Prevention, Response and Recovery (PPRR). These are not distinct linear segments independent of each other, but can overlap and run concurrently. It embraces the view that a prepared community is a safer community.
3. All Hazards Approach. This describes arrangements managing the wide range of possible outcomes of crises, as many risks cause similar outcomes that require similar responses.
4. Integrated or All Agencies Approach. At a local community level this includes involvement of government agencies such as the Department of Communities, Bureau of Meteorology, local councils, emergency services such as police, fire, ambulance and SES, as well as NGO's such as community groups including local church and religious organisations and school parent and citizen committees, volunteer service organisations and media groups, particularly local radio. It embraces the view that working together, informed, alert, active citizens can do much to help themselves and their community.
5. The Bottom Up Approach. This firmly places the leadership of the emergency management processes in the hands of the controller, on the ground, confronting the disaster.

== Business ==
Disasters are just as destructive to business as they are to communities. The recommended structure for an emergency control organisation in a workplace is laid down in AS NZS 3745:2010 Planning for Emergencies in Facilities. While only a guide, this document is reinforced by Workplace Health and Safety Legislation. This places the responsibility of the person in charge of a workplace to ensure the safety of everyone in the workplace. In the States and Territories this is reinforced by further statute and common law. In Queensland, the Queensland Fire and Rescue Service undertake random but regular audits of workplaces to ensure compliance. In addition, well managed businesses should maintain and test their own business continuity plans in accordance with AS/NZS 5050:2010 - Business Continuity - managing Disruption Related Risk. Again this document is only a guide but this work should come under governance as it enhances an organisation's resilience.

== Understanding the risk ==
In 2009, The Centre for Research on the Epidemiology of Disasters reported that Australia came in at 10th place on the list of countries with the highest number of reported natural disasters during that year. With this understanding of the risk it confronts, Australia maintains a state of preparedness and is constantly advancing its emergency management processes through the resilience improvement cycle.
