= Incident base =

US emergency incident support location

According to the National Incident Management System (NIMS), the Incident Base is one of five predesignated temporary facilities and it is the location at which primary support activities are conducted for emergencies like a wildland fire. A single incident base is established to house all equipment and personnel support operations. The Logistics Section, which orders all resources and supplies, is also located at this base. The Incident Base should be designed to be able to support operations at multiple incident sites.

== See also ==
=== NIMS Predesignated Facilities and Areas ===
- Incident Command Post (ICP)
- Incident Base
- Camp, or fire camp
- Mobilization and staging area
- Helibase and supporting Helispot and Drop Point
