= OnPage Corporation =

- Industry: Critical Communications
- Founded: 2011
- Founder: Judit Sharon
- Headquarters: Waltham, MA, United States
- Website: onpage.com

OnPage Corporation is a provider of SaaS-based Incident Management systems and Clinical Communication platforms. OnPage was founded in 2011 by Judit Sharon and is based in Waltham, Massachusetts.

== Overview and History ==
Before becoming OnPage Corporation, the company was named Onset Technology. Onset Technology was founded in 1997 and focused on facilitating emergency communications for large enterprises in disastrous situations to enable PIN-to-PIN messaging on the BlackBerry mobile device. In 2011, the company released OnPage, a cloud-based and first-to-market pager replacement solution. In 2015, the company was re-branded as OnPage Corporation.

Today, the company is a SaaS-based platform that provides incident alert management tools for professionals in IT support, healthcare, manufacturing, Internet of things (IoT) and managed services.
