= Advanced disaster management simulator =

Emergency and disaster management training simulation system

The ADMS (advanced disaster management simulator) is an emergency and disaster management training simulation system designed to train incident commanders, first responders, and incident command teams in a real-time, interactive virtual reality environment. ADMS was first introduced by Environmental Tectonics Corporation (ETCC:US) in 1992. The development of ADMS was in response to the crash of British Airtours Flight 28M at the Manchester airport in 1985, in which 55 people died. Following the accident research indicated that first responder training should include realistic scenarios. The first ADMS system was produced for the UK Ministry of Defence, and delivered to Royal Air Force's (RAF) Manston Facility. Since its inception, ADMS has evolved into a modular, expandable disaster simulation platform, with systems in use worldwide.

== History ==
=== Virtual reality and emergency management training ===
The successful use of virtual reality simulation in disaster management training initiatives is a popular area for research. It has been found that when trainees are able to participate, both verbally and physically in a training exercise, retention is 90%, in great contrast to a 10% retention rate of what they hear, and 50% retention rate of what they see and hear.

Traditionally classroom lectures, tabletop exercises and live-training drills have been utilized for training. While these teaching methodologies are effective, virtual reality simulation seems to have bridged the gap between them. Virtual reality offers the opportunity to create an emergency situation that could not otherwise be experienced due to safety, cost and environmental factors. From a safety standpoint, training in a synthetic environment allows the student to experiment while carrying out dangerous actions, and offers the ability to repeat the exercise until the trainee feels confident and prepared for real-life incidents.

== Technology ==
The ADMS relies on a physics engine and built in artificial intelligence to provide realistic, 3D emergency situations. The Disaster scenarios include algorithms which take into account: type of threat, time of day, precipitation, wind, visibility, condition of casualties, terrain, and traffic and bystander behavior ADMS training exercises are unscripted and open-ended, requiring interactive decision making and participation from the users to affect the outcome of the training exercise. The development, escalation, or resolution of the situation is determined by the trainees' decisions and the use of intelligent resources they command.

ADMS is a networked framework and a family of applications which may be run on a single station or as a multi-user system with several networked stations giving independent access to several viewpoints and control interfaces within the same environment and scenario. ADMS projects its simulations using panoramic high-definition multimedia interface, visual displays and directional sound. The simulation engine includes key models including: artificial intelligence, physics, logic, and messaging and applications comprising a visual engine, sound engine, messaging daemon and graphical user interface.

=== Environments ===
ADMS environments are developed in either geo-typical or geo-specific environments. Geo-specific environments are created using exact 3D modeling of the specified location, and can include buildings, streets, vehicles, terrain and people, specific airports or schools, or entire cities.

== Products and applications ==
- ADMS-COMMAND Designed for training incident commanders in a diverse range of emergency scenarios, ranging from car accidents to low-frequency, high casualty situations, either in single or multi-agency operations. Trainees make decisions and give verbal commands, enabling the real-time action of the simulator. The system can be expanded to include additional simulation elements, including vehicle controls and cabs, and 180 degree immersive visual displays.
- ADMS-DRIVE Designed to train, assess and recertify drivers in safe and effective driving procedures. It is also utilized as a training platform to train emergency responders to drive under stressful situations, and by airport snow removal teams to train in snow removal operations during winter conditions. ADMS-DRIVE immerses the user in a realistic, virtual environment in which dynamic elements such as traffic, signal lights, people and weather create a realistic and challenging representation of the situation.
- ADMS-ARFF Designed as an aircraft rescue and firefighting vehicle simulator which focuses on correct turret operation, driving and communication, vehicle positioning, firefighting with turrets and Command and Control. The trainee uses controls and joysticks to maneuver the vehicle in an airport environment and deals with airplane disaster.
- ADMS-HRET HRET (High-reach extendable turret) is intended to be a training aid for operators to become familiar with, and enhance the skills necessary for actual hands on operation of the Rosenbauer HRET. HRET is a portable desktop system that comes with a console that includes a real HRET-joystick and relevant switches. Trainees can drive to the scene, train various external and internal fire scenarios, and penetrate the aircraft by using the piercing device.
- ADMS-BART The behavioral assessment research tool (BART) was developed initially for the Netherlands Institute for Safety, Research Department. BART focuses on human behavior and the effect it has in a real-life incident. ADMS-BART creates an environment where virtual human subjects act as they would in a live situation. This system made it possible to use virtual reality for studying virtual behaviors in fires, allowing for changes in the live environment to mitigate the damages in the event of a live incident.
- ADMS-US Is a standardized simulation system, programmed with ten geo-typical situation environments which resemble Anytown USA. ADMS-US is a portable, laptop based simulator which is utilized for either individual or multi-agency training who do not require geo-specific capabilities.

== Compliance ==
On January 27, 2009, the U.S. Army Program Executive Office for Simulation, Training and Instrumentation (PEO STRI) awarded ETC STOC II eligibility for the ADMS. STOC II is an ID/IQ (Indefinite Delivery/Indefinite Quantity) contract vehicle with a ceiling of $17.5 billion over a period of 10 years. All branches of the military are eligible to utilize STOC II to quickly obtain simulation and training solutions from a panel of pre-qualified companies. The purpose of this contract vehicle was to provide an efficient method for the U.S. military and its coalition service members to acquire what they need.

Additionally, ADMS was designed to be NIMS compliant. The National Incident Management System has developed a unified approach to allow governmental agencies to work in unison with the private sector with the common goal of preparing for, preventing, responding to, recovering from, and mitigating the effects of incidents of any cause, size, location, or complexity.

== Users ==
- New York City Office of Emergency Management
- Rochester Fire Department / Public Safety Training Facility (PSTF) - Rochester, NY
- Minneapolis – St. Paul International Airport
- Florida State Fire College
- Netherlands Institute for Safety (NIFV)
- South Korea National Fire Service Academy (SFNFSA)
- Pennsylvania Southeast Region Counter Terrorism Task Force
- Aurora Community College
- Butler County Community College
- Noblesville Fire Department
- Pinellas Park High School
- Rosenbauer
- Rockland County New York fire academy
