= Fire camp =

Campsite for firefighters and support personnel

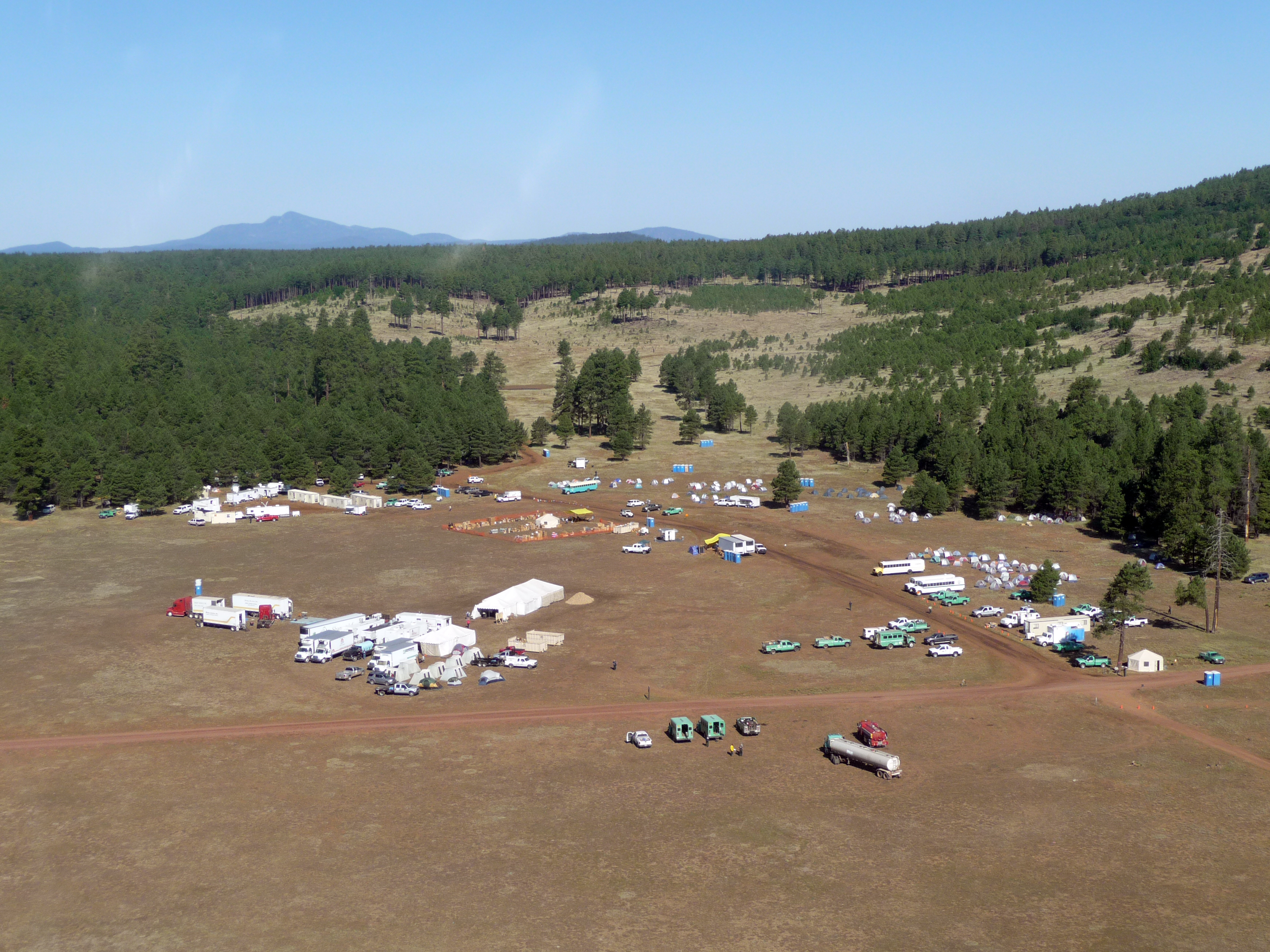
The base fire camp set up to fight the Taylor fire in Coconino National Forest in 2009

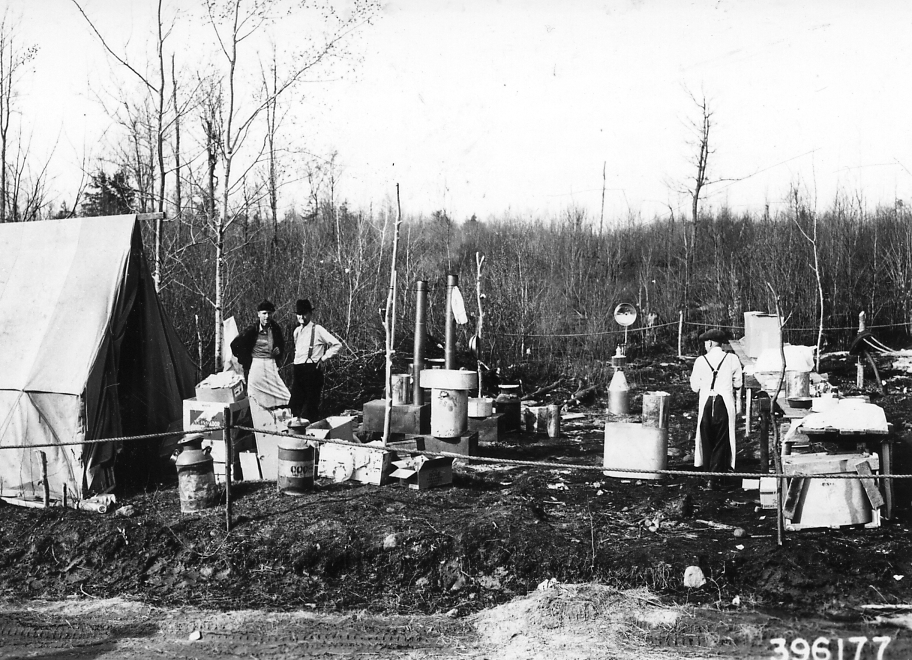
The fire camp for the Hughey Fire near Medford in 1940

A fire camp is a campsite for wildland firefighters and support personnel. It is typically set up for a large project fire which requires a large amount of manpower, organisation and logistics. According to the National Incident Management System (NIMS), a fire camp is one of five predesignated temporary facilities. Fire camps provide certain essential auxiliary forms of support, such as food, sleeping areas, and sanitation for firefighters. Fire camps may also provide minor maintenance and servicing of equipment.

While a fire camp is technically separate from the incident command post and incident base, it is common practice in U.S. wildland firefighting to set up the fire camp at the incident command post or incident base. Spike camps are satellites of the main fire camp and generally draw their supplies and food from the main camp while providing their own sanitation facilities. Spike camps are used to support operation areas that require personnel to travel extended distances to return to the main camp. They are generally seen as a safety measure to prevent excessive fatigue and reduce the probability of a collision with a civilian vehicle or stationary object.

== See also ==
- Mobilization and staging area
- Helibase, Helispot and Helicopter drop point
- California fire camps, an example of fire camps staffed by incarcerated firefighters
