= Multiagency Coordination Systems =

Plans for bureaucratic cooperation in United States civil defense

Multi-agency Coordination Systems (MACS) are a part of the United States standardized Incident Command System. MACS provides the basic architecture for facilitating the allocation of resources, incident prioritization, coordination and integration of multiple agencies for large-scale incidents and emergencies.

== Functions and responsibilities ==
The principal functions and responsibilities of MAC entities typically include the following:

- Ensuring that each agency involved in incident management activities is providing appropriate situational awareness and resource status information;
- Establishing priorities between incidents and/or Area Commands in concert with Incident Commanders or a Unified Command;
- Acquiring and allocating resources required by incident management personnel in concert with the priorities established by Incident or Unified Command;
- Anticipating and identifying future resource requirements;
- Coordinating and resolving policy issues arising from the incident(s); and
- Providing strategic coordination as required.
