= Rocky Mount Fire of 2016 =

Wildfire in Virginia, United States

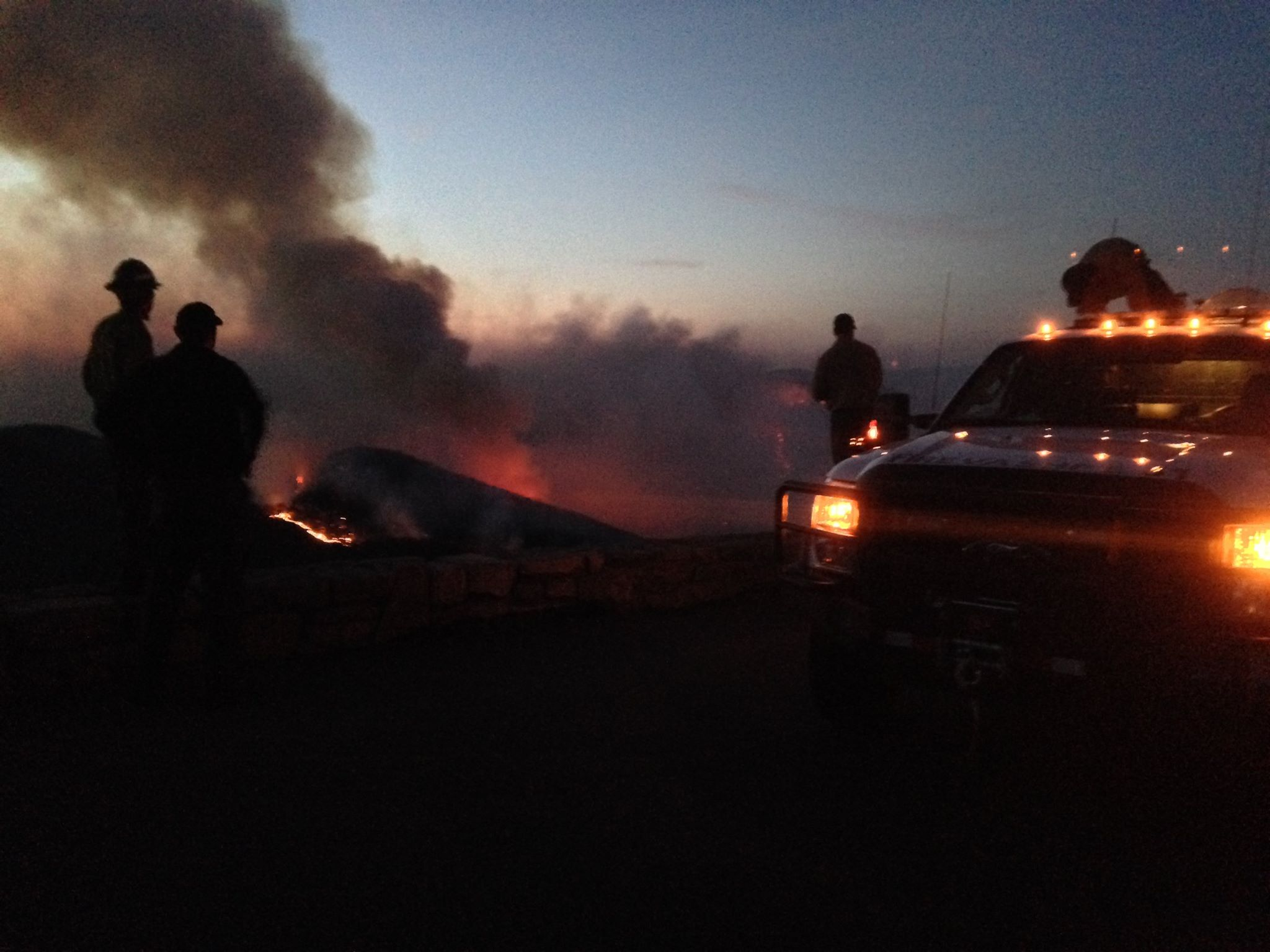
- Firefighters observe Rocky Mount Fire during evening of April 18, 2016
- Date: April 16-May 3, 2016
- Location: Shenandoah National Park, Rockingham County, Virginia, United States
- Coordinates: 38°19′53″N 078°38′59″W

Statistics
- Burned area: 10,326 acres (4,179 ha)
- Land use: Forest

On Friday, April 16, 2016, a 200-acre (81 ha) forest fire was first reported in Shenandoah National Park in the U.S. state of Virginia. The fire originated in the area around Rocky Mount, a mountain in the south district of the park, in a remote region south of Elkton, Virginia. The fire was west of Skyline Drive, the scenic byway that runs through the park. By April 17, the fire had spread to over 500 acres (200 ha), prompting closures of Skyline Drive from mile markers 65 at Swift Run Gap to 79 at Loft Mountain. Additionally, more than a dozen hiking trails were closed, including a section of the Appalachian Trail. By Monday April 18, officials reported that the fire had spread to over 2,000 acres (810 ha) and that a Type 1 incident management team (highest priority) and several hotshot firefighting crews had been dispatched to address the situation. By Wednesday April 20, more than 200 firefighters were on scene or en route, supported by two helicopters carrying water buckets and eight fire engines. National Park Service officials reported on the morning of April 20 that the fire had spread to 4,000 acres (1,600 ha) and that 250 firefighting personnel were engaged in establishing firelines in an effort to control the blaze. By that evening, officials had reported that the fire had expanded to roughly 5,616 acres (2,273 ha) and that at mile marker 76 on Skyline Drive, the fire had crossed the road and burned another 80 to 100 acres (32 to 40 ha). The fire was only 1 percent contained and full containment was not anticipated until April 30 because of ongoing weather conditions favoring fire growth. By the evening of Thursday, April 21, the fire had expanded to 7,935 acres (3,211 ha) and more than 300 firefighting and support personnel had been assigned to the fire. The fire expanded to 8,952 acres (3,623 ha) and 342 firefighters were assigned to the fire by the evening of April 22.

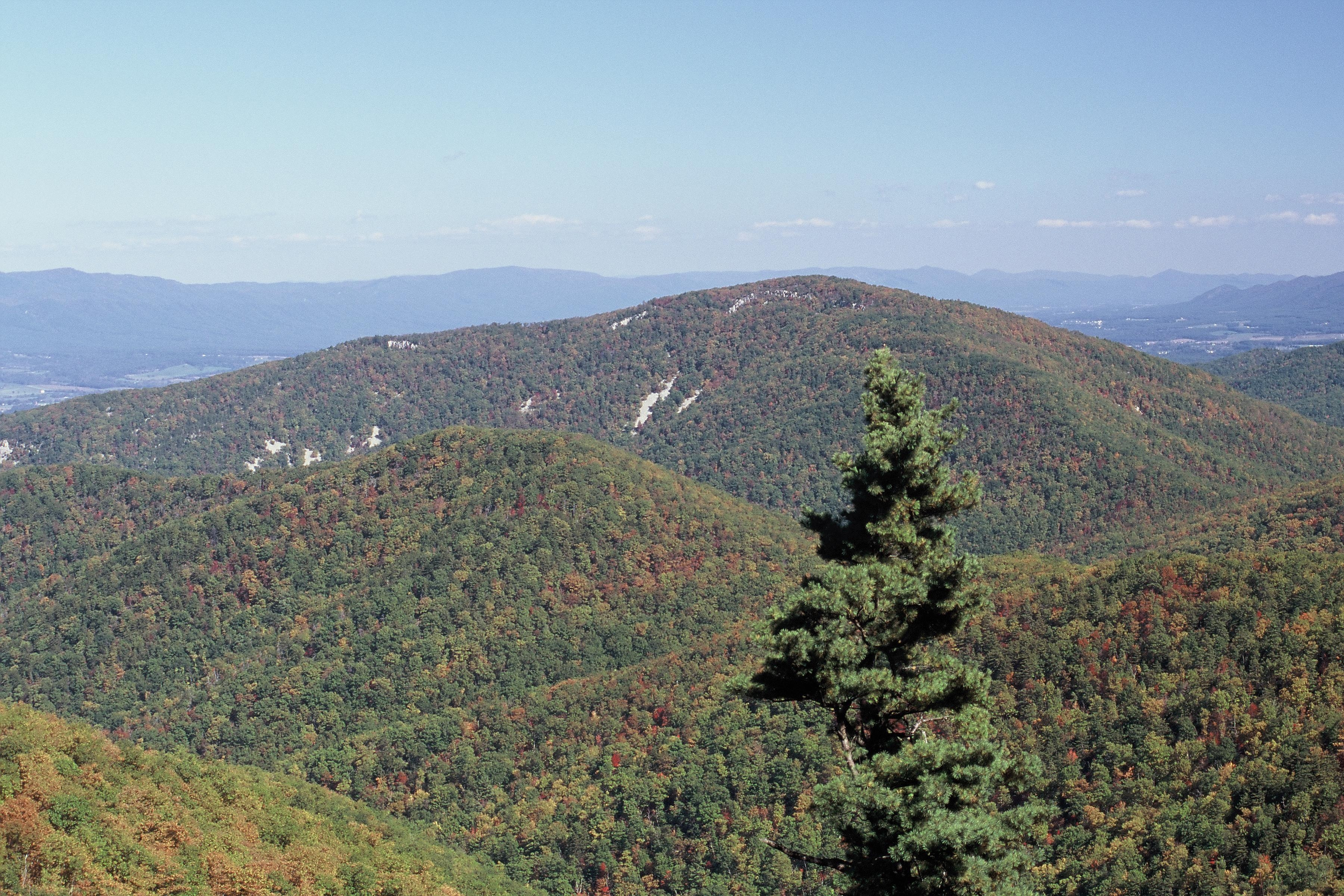
Rocky Mount before the fire

Skyline Drive road closure was extended further south to mile 87 on April 22. By the evening of April 24, the fire had expanded slightly from the previous day to 9,386 acres (3,798 ha). The fire was 60 percent contained and 356 firefighting and support personnel were assigned to the fire. On April 25, total acreage burned was 10,376 acres (4,199 ha), partly due to back burn efforts to burn out vegetation in the path of the main fire. The back-burn was created by dropping "ping pong balls" from a helicopter; these are spheres the size of a ping pong ball filled with a flammable substance that ignites as they impact the ground. On April 28, the fire was 90 percent contained and rainfall and fog made for difficult fireline work for the firefighters. However, the fire was deemed to be well within containment lines and a third of the firefighting personnel were demobilized. Mop up of firelines and rehabilitation of trails and natural resources was expected to continue until May 3. The final figure for acreage burned was determined to be 10,326 acres (4,179 ha); the second largest forest fire in the history of Shenadoah National Park. On April 29, the fire was fully contained and while most of the hiking trails that had been closed to public access remained closed for a few more days, Skyline Drive was reopened to public vehicular traffic.

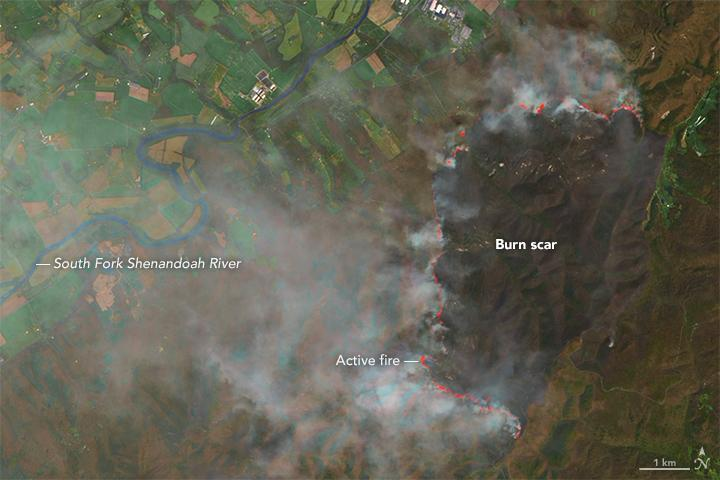
Burn scar area at right showing red areas actively burning on April 22, 2016

Smoke from the fire was reportedly visible in satellite imagery, drifting southeast and causing smoke haze over portions of central Virginia. The cause of the fire is unknown, but officials reported that it was likely human-caused. The fire's expansion was mainly caused by relatively hot and dry conditions compounded by low humidity levels and moderate to occasionally gusty winds. Smoke from the fire that was drifting to the southeast on April 19 shifted to the northwest on the 20th and again to the northeast on the 21st, spreading particulates into the air over Washington, D.C. The wind shift was due to an approaching weather front that brought only .10 inches (2.5 mm) of rain. To accommodate hikers attempting to use the Appalachian Trail, a shuttle service was set up to run every hour during normal business hours for the duration of the fire and trail closure. A no fly zone was also enacted, including prohibiting private drones from flying anywhere near the fire. The fire burned a region that had not previously experienced a fire since the creation of the park, so the area was full of dead and down wood, deep duff and overgrowth that was overdue for a large fire.
