= Resource Ordering Status System =

In the United States, the National Wildfire Coordinating Group operates a nationwide, web-based database system for managing wildland firefighting resources. The system, called National Interagency Resource Ordering and Status System or Resource Ordering and Status System, (or simply ROSS), improves efficiency of borrowing and sending home of fire equipment in a large, campaign-type fire. It coordinates equipment movements across bureaucratic lines, making state and federal resources look more like a single pool of equipment and staff.

In the past, borrowing equipment and staff, called resources, from other agencies required people in a command center to place telephone calls and make radio inquiries to find out what was available. Some agencies had internal computer systems to manage equipment and staff moves but they could not exchange data with the systems of other agencies. This made processes produce non-repeatable results and was labor-intensive, tying up staff on the telephone during their busiest periods. ROSS speeds the process and gives system users an enhanced understanding of:

- what quantity of resources are assigned to a fire.
- what quantity of resources are on the way to the fire.
- how deeply their resources have been depleted by requests.
- how soon local equipment will return from a distant assignment.

Participating agencies include many state fire suppression organizations such as CAL FIRE, and federal entities such as the Bureau of Indian Affairs, Bureau of Land Management, Department of the Interior, United States Fish and Wildlife Service, National Park Service, National Information Technology Center, and the United States Forest Service. The National Wildfire Coordinating Group membership is made up of representatives from each of these Federal land management agencies and the National Association of State Foresters.

== See also ==
- Incident Command System
