= Interagency Fire Qualifications Rating =

An Interagency Fire Qualifications Card or a "Red Card" is a small card issued to wildland firefighters in the United States at the beginning of each season by their home unit.

The card contains information as to which wildland fire positions (outlined in NWCG Publication PMS 310-1) the person is both fully qualified at and which positions they are a trainee for. The cards are required during the check-in process (national response) wildland fires.

Federal wildland fire cards look different from cards issued by most state agencies but they contain the same general information. Each card contains the date of the last physical fitness test, name, qualifications and trainee positions. Wildland firefighters are required to carry their red cards on fires, anyone can ask to see an individual's card at any time to confirm they are qualified at the position they are performing.Interagency Standards for Fire and Fire Aviation Operations - Chapter 13
