= Unified command (ICS) =

In the Incident Command System, a unified command is an authority structure in which the role of incident commander is shared by two or more individuals, each already having authority in a different responding agency. Unified command is one way to carry out command in which responding agencies and/or jurisdictions with responsibility for the incident share incident management.

A unified command may be needed for incidents involving multiple jurisdictions or agencies.

If a unified command is needed, incident commanders representing agencies or jurisdictions that share responsibility for the incident manage the response from a single incident command post. A unified command allows agencies with different legal, geographic, and functional authorities and responsibilities to work together effectively without affecting individual agency, authority, responsibility, or accountability. Under a unified command, a single, coordinated incident action plan will direct all activities. The incident commanders will supervise a single command and general staff organization and speak with one voice.
