= National Wildfire Coordinating Group =

Multi-agency mutual aide response model for forest wildfires

The National Wildfire Coordinating Group Logo

The National Wildfire Coordinating Group (NWCG) was formed in the United States as a result of the aftermath of a major wildfire season in 1970, including the Laguna Fire.

The 1970 fire season underscored the need for a national set of training and equipment standards which would be standardized across the different agencies. NWCG included representatives from the United States Forest Service, the Bureau of Land Management, the National Park Service, the Bureau of Indian Affairs, the U.S. Fish and Wildlife Service, and the National Association of State Foresters.

After a series of meetings in the early 1970s, the NWCG was officially chartered by the Secretaries of the Interior and Agriculture in 1976.

Among the notable results of the NWCG has been the adoption of the Interagency Fire Qualifications Rating system, more commonly known among firefighters as the "red card" qualification system; the establishment of the series of training classes associated with the red card system (such as the basic wildland fire course, S-130/S-190); the establishment of an interagency fire training center at Marana, Arizona; the publication of training manuals such as the Fireline Handbook; and the Resource Ordering Status System.

NWCG was formed independently of two other programs which also formed in the 1970s out of the need for greater interagency coordination: the Boise Interagency Fire Center (now the National Interagency Fire Center), and the FIRESCOPE program in southern California.

== SmoC ==
The NWCG oversees the Smoke Committee (SmoC), an advisory group that addresses strategies and guidance for addressing smoke within fire and fuels programs nationwide.

The Committee's web page describes itself as a forum where air resource and wildland fire management programs and member agencies will discuss and attempt to resolve technical, regulatory and policy matters of joint interest concerning fire emissions and air quality impacts on firefighter and public safety and health from planned and unplanned fires.

== National Incident Management Organization ==
In 2003, an Interagency Team identified strategies to improve incident management. The NWCG accepted the conclusions of the study in 2005 and the National Incident Management Organization (NIMO) was formed. The NIMO is a seven-member team of professional incident managers with complex incident management as their primary focus. In addition to incident management NIMO provides training, leadership development and other support activities.

== See also ==
- Pyne, Stephen J., Fire In America, 1982 University of Washington Press.
- National Incident Management System (NIMS)
- Incident Command System (ICS)
- Wildfire
