= Australasian Inter-Service Incident Management System =

Incident management system

In Australia, the Australasian Inter-Service Incident Management System (AIIMS) is the nationally recognised system of incident management for the nation's fire and emergency service agencies. Organisational principles and structure are used to manage bushfires and other large emergencies (e.g. floods, storms, cyclones etc.) utilising the all agencies approach. AIIMS was first developed by the Forests Commission Victoria (FCV) in wake of the Ash Wednesday Bushfires in 1983 as a derivative of the United States’ NIMS, and is based on the principles of management by objectives, functional management, common terminology and limits to the span of control. AIIMS is a trademark of AFAC and the material in the AIIMS manual and training materials is copyright of AFAC.

== Principles ==
AIIMS is based on five key principles:

- Management by objectives
- Functional management
- Span of control
- Flexibility
- Unity of command

=== History ===
The Forests Commission Victoria (FCV) had begun experimenting with new fire control arrangements from the mid-1970s based on shared experiences with the US Forest Service. Different arrangements had been trialled at Cann River and Warburton during the disastrous 1983 Ash Wednesday bushfires. After the fires, the Forests Commission made major changes on approaching large fire suppression and control on State forest and National Parks. The Country Fire Authority (CFA) were responsible for fires on private land and operated independently on separate radio frequencies under a group structure. Cross agency issues sometimes arose within the “Marginal Mile”; so FCV and CFA liaison officers were often appointed in the event of large or complex bushfires.

During 1984, Kevin Monk from the FCV’s Fire Protection Branch travelled on a Churchill Fellowship to California to study the United States National Incident Management System (NIMS). He brought back the NIMS documentation and developed a Victorian version, which became known as the Large Fire Organisation (LFO). Importantly, the LFO was designed to be scalable; from Level 1 for simple local incidents, through to Level 3 for complex multi-agency and campaign bushfires.

By the summer of 1984-85 the LFO was being progressively adopted, with dedicated Incident Management Teams (IMTs) complete with Incident Controllers, Operations, Planning and Logistics units identified and trained within the new Conservation, Forests, and Lands (CFL) Regions. CFL replaced the Forests Commission in mid 1983.

Athol Hodgson was appointed CFL’s first Chief Fire Officer (1984-87) and was a strong advocate for new emergency arrangements. He led a high-level delegation of Australian bushfire controllers on a study tour to the USA and Canada in 1984. Brian Potter, Chief of the CFA (1985-91), was on the tour and also became an enthusiastic supporter.

The fires of January 1985 in the alps near Mt Buffalo were the first major test for the newly formed Department of CFL. It was also the largest deployment of firefighting aircraft in Australia up to that time, including 20 helicopters and 16 fixed-wing aircraft from the FCV, Australian Defence Force and NSCA. The LFO was given a thorough test run at these fires. Later Chief Fire Officers, Barry Johnston (1987-90), Rod Incoll (1990-96) and Gary Morgan (1996-2005) maintained the momentum for changes to command-and-control arrangements at large bushfires in Victoria.

Significantly, in 1986, the Victorian Emergency Management Act provided for a single controller to be appointed for each joint CFA/CFL bushfire. Later in 1988 the Australian Association of Rural Fire Authorities adopted the principals embodied in LFO and NIMS.

The LFO became the forerunner of the Australasian Inter-Service Incident Management System (AIIMS) which was adopted nationally in the early 1990s under newly formed Australasian Fire and Emergency Service Authorities Council (AFAC).

AIIMS was jointly adopted by the CFA and CFL in 1991 with the intent of bringing emergency services together under one control system with common terminology; a Multi-Agency Incident Management Agreement was signed by the Chief Officers of the CFA and CFL on 14 November 1997 to give more detail on joint firefighting arrangements, although it took many years to make the full transition to other agencies and interstate.

The operation, training and slow uptake of AIIMS were some of the key issues at the Coronial Inquest into the deaths of five CFA firefighters at Linton in December 1998.

The first major deployment of Australian firefighter's to America in 2000 was made possible by the adoption of AIIMS.

=== Management by objectives ===
To ensure all incident personnel are working towards one set of objectives, the Incident Controller, in consultation with the Incident Management Team, determines the desired outcomes of the incident. These are communicated to all involved. At any point in time, an incident can have only one set of objectives and one Incident Action Plan for achieving objectives.

=== Functional management ===
The control system of AIIMS is based on a structure of delegation with five functional areas: Control, Planning, Public Information, Operations and Logistics. This guarantees that all vital management and information functions are performed.

- Control - The management of all activities necessary for the resolution of an incident. (Coloured White)
- Planning - The collection and analysis of information and the development of plans for the resolution of an incident. (Coloured Yellow)
- Public Information - Provision of warnings, information and advice to the public and liaison with the media and affected communities. (Coloured Brown)
- Operations - The tasking and application of resources to achieve resolution of an incident. (Coloured Red)
- Logistics - The acquisition and provision of human and physical resources, facilities, services and materials to support achievement of incident objectives. (Coloured Blue)

For every incident, an Incident Controller is appointed who is ultimately responsible and accountable for all of the five functions. Depending on the size and complexity of an incident, the Incident Controller may elect to delegate one or more of the functions of planning, public information, operations and logistics.

Functional management dictates that there can only be one Incident Controller managing an incident at any one time. Delegation of the functions results in an Incident Management Team of up to five people and enables span of control to be maintained.

The Public Information Unit was added the AIIMS 3rd edition (2011) as a result of recommendations from the 2009 Black Saturday Bushfires Royal Commission.

=== Span of control ===
Span of control is a concept that relates to the number of groups or individuals that can be successfully supervised by one person. During emergency incidents, the environment in which supervision is required can rapidly change and become dangerous if not managed effectively. Up to five reporting groups or individuals is considered to be desirable, as this maintains a supervisor’s ability to effectively task, monitor and evaluate performance.

Where span of control is exceeded, the supervising officer should consider delegating responsibility to others. Conversely, where the span of control is lower or the tasks are fewer (for example in a de-escalating incident), the supervisor may reassume responsibility or reorganise delegation to contract the structure to fit the tasks required.

The way in which AIIMS is "scalable" is that it does not require the full-scale response to every incident – it allows for the build-up of resources and response activity. For example, a single-story house does not require an Incident Control Centre (i.e. control room) with six people managing the incident; however, the 2010–2011 Queensland floods required all functional areas to be filled by a separate individual as other people filling the other roles which come under each functional area (e.g. welfare, catering etc.) as a single person would not be able to handle the logistics, operations, planning etc. all by themselves as would be expected of the single-story fire (at least in the first instance).

This scalability is also demonstrated by AIIMS being used by other agencies such as Department of Energy, Environment and Climate Action (DEECA) where they state "the use of the AIIMS system promotes effective joint operations through the use of common structures and terminology" when they collaborate with other agencies using AIIMS to manage public land emergencies (e.g. floods, fires etc.).

Its uses also extended to the management of the locust plague, where they used an AIIMS-like system called the Biosecurity Incident Management System (BIMS) to manage the incident. Like AIIMS, BIMS is a derivative of NIIMS.

As with any system it is not without its criticisms, mainly stemming from when people should delegate (i.e. scale the system) from a single incident controller to an IC plus Operations Officer, or when to involve planning. As demonstrated by Black Saturday bushfires or the 2010-2011 Queensland floods, improvements needed to be made around who is responsible for intelligence, inter-service communication etc. Whether these have been overcome by the promotion of Intelligence and Public Information may become clear as debriefs from the 2019-2020 summer fires take place across Australia.

=== Unity of Command ===
Unity of Command refers to the need for each individual to only have one leader and there is a clear hierarchy to ensure consistent management of an emergency. Along with span of control this allows for a flexible, scalable and manageable structure that can be tailored for the unique requirements of an incident.

=== Flexibility ===
As no two incidents are the same, the structure needed to meet the demands of various incidents must also vary to adapt to the situation. The ability to scale the structure to combine different roles for smaller incidents and then separate out the AIIMS functions as the incident grows or changes is one of the key advantages of AIIMS.

== See also ==
- Emergency Management Australia
