= Incident Command Post =

Type of temporary facility

According to the National Incident Management System (NIMS), and the Incident Command System (ICS), the incident command post (ICP) is one of five predesignated temporary facilities and signifies the physical location of the tactical-level, on-scene incident command and management organization. It typically comprises the incident commander and immediate staff and may include other designated incident management officials and responders from federal, state, local, and tribal agencies, as well as private-sector, nongovernmental, and volunteer organizations.

Typically, the ICP is located at or in the immediate vicinity of the incident site and is the focus for the conduct of direct, on-scene control of tactical operations. Incident planning is also conducted at the ICP; an incident communications center also would normally be established at this location. The ICP may be collocated with the incident base, if the communications requirements can be met. The ICP may perform local emergency operations center-like functions in the context of smaller jurisdictions or less complex incident scenarios. It is commonly marked with a green emergency light, so as to be distinguished from a distance.

== See also ==
- Incident base
- Fire camp
- Mobilization and staging area
- Helitack
