= FIRESCOPE =

Backronym background

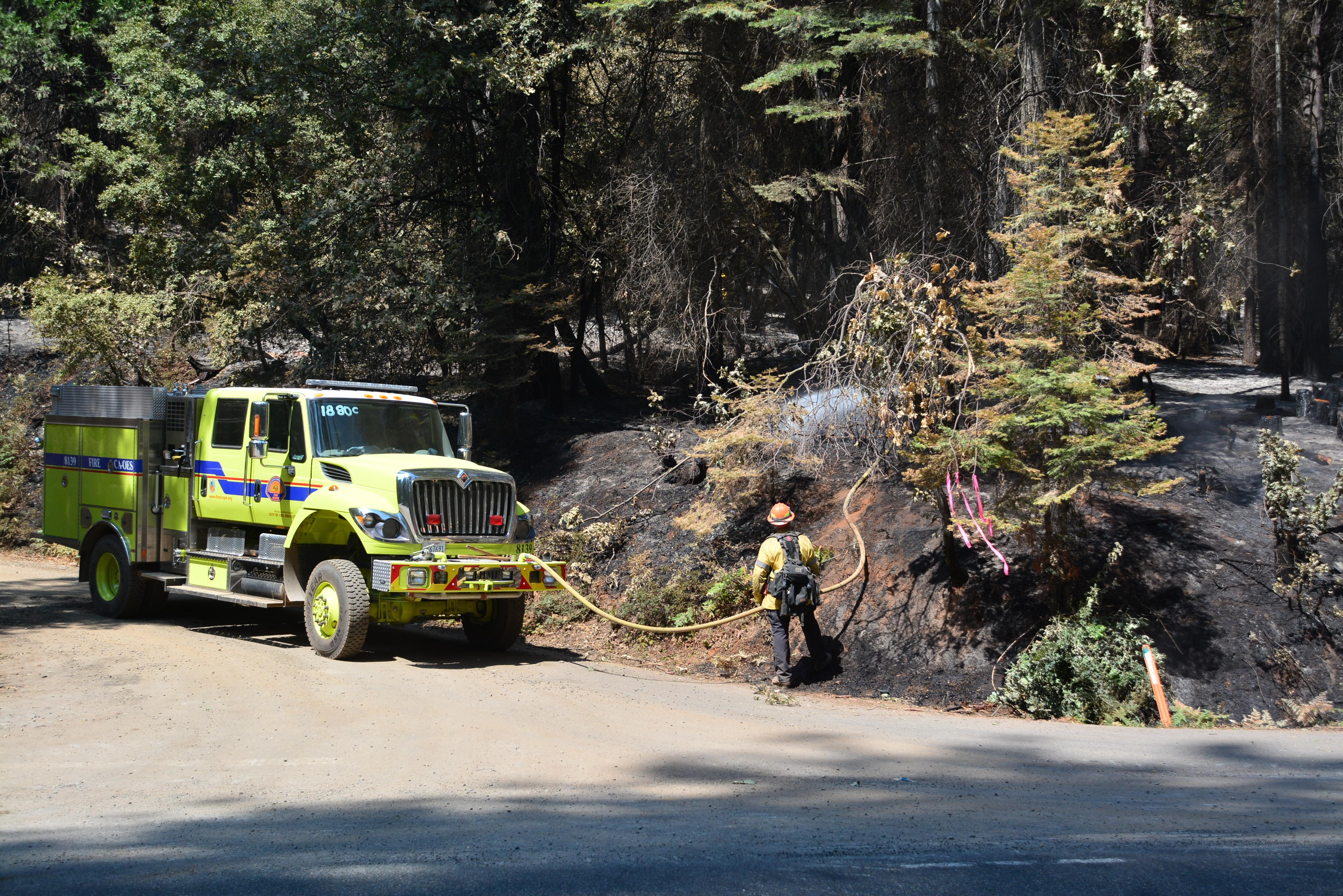
A wildland fire engine associated with FIRESCOPE mopping up a hotspot during the Railroad Fire in 2017

FIRESCOPE (backronym: Firefighting Resources of Southern California Organized for Potential Emergencies) is a system for efficient interagency resource coordination system for fire and other emergencies in the southern California region of the United States. It was developed after a bout of massive wildfires in southern California in 1970 that burned for days and involved multiple jurisdictions.

Major wildland fires are a common annual occurrence in Southern California with its warm climate which typically gives the area four to six months of almost total drought. In addition, the region is threatened with infrequent, but potentially disastrous, urban emergencies precipitated by flooding, earthquake, and fire. FIRESCOPE is directed towards improving the effectiveness and cooperation of fire services in response to a major incident. A major component of the program was the design and development of the Incident Command System, which has been adopted by FEMA for the management of all that agency's emergency activities.

The design of the program, as well as its initial development and testing was begun in 1972 by a specially chartered research development and application (RD&A) program at the United States Forest Service Forest Fire Laboratory in Riverside, California. Funding for the five-year RD&A program was provided by a special appropriation from the United States Congress in response to concerns raised by disastrous southern California wildfires in 1970 which burned more than a half million acres, destroying 700 structures and taking 16 lives.

== See also ==
- California Department of Forestry and Fire Protection
- National Wildfire Coordinating Group
- National Interagency Fire Center
- Wildfires in California
- Wildland fire suppression
