= Incident management team =

Emergency response team

An incident management team (IMT) is a group of trained personnel that responds to an emergency. The term is generally used in the United States. Incident management teams are rostered personnel trained in the Incident Command System who are deployed to emergency or disaster situations to staff or augment an Emergency Operations Center or Incident Command.

Although the incident management team concept was originally developed for wildfire response, its use has expanded into what is now known as an "All-Hazards Incident Management Team”. An AHIMT can respond to a wide range of emergencies, including fires, floods, earthquakes, hurricanes, tornadoes, tsunami, riots, spilling of hazardous materials, and other natural or human-caused incidents.

== Types ==
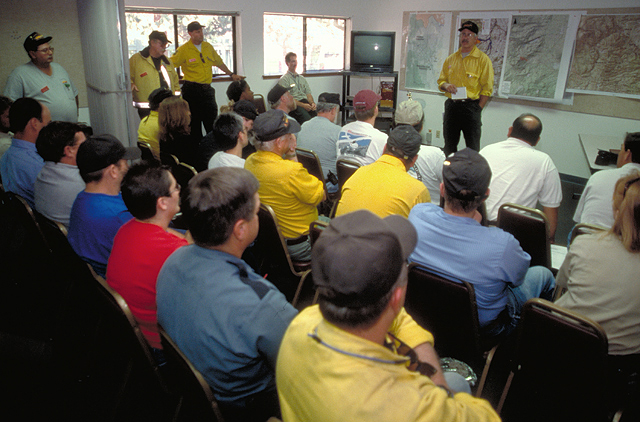
A Type 2 Incident Management Team assumes management of a fire emergency.

In the United States, there are predominantly two types of Incident Management Teams (IMTs). An incident such as a wildland fire is initially managed by local fire departments or fire agencies without a formal incident management team in place. If the fire becomes complex, additional resources are called in to address the emergency over the larger geographic area or greater level of impact. IMTs are "typed" according to the size, scope, and complexity of incidents they are capable of managing and are part of an incident command system. A type 3 team may be called to manage a large or emerging incident that exceeds the ability of local resources to control. For very large, dangerous or complex incidents (type 1 or type 2), a Complex Incident Management Team may be called to assume command.

=== Incident typing ===
There is an incident typing system that is based on the complexity and duration of an incident. From simplest and smallest to largest and most complex, they are:

Type 5: An incident that is simple and of short duration such as an automobile collision. An IMT is usually not required for this type of event.

Type 4: An incident that is relatively simple but may last up to 24–48 hours. These incidents usually do not require an IMT.

Type 3: An incident that that is more complex and/or of a longer duration and will last longer than a few operational periods. Resources from outside the incident area may be needed. IMTs are often used in this type of response to provide additional expertise or relief as local emergency managers become exhausted.

Type 2: An incident that is complex and longer lasting. The response may take weeks, and resources will be required from state and national entities. IMTs are used in this type of incident because of their duration and because of the advanced training required to staff a complex incident.

Type 1: The most complex type of incident and usually weeks or months in duration. This type of incident requires resources from state and national entities. As in Type 2 incidents, IMTs are used in this type of incident because of the duration and the advanced skillset required.

Incident management starts as the smallest unit and escalates according to the size, scope, and complexity of the emergency. The five types of IMTs are as follows, according to the US Fire Administration:

- Type 5: Local Village and Township Level – a "pool" of primarily fire officers from several neighboring departments trained to serve in Command and General Staff positions during the first 6–12 hours of an incident.
- Type 4: City, County, or Fire District Level – a designated team of fire, EMS, and possibly law enforcement officers from a larger and generally more populated area, typically within a single jurisdiction (city or county), activated when necessary to manage an incident during the first 6–12 hours and possibly transition to a Type 3 IMT.
- Type 3: State or Metropolitan Area Level – comprising several entities within a state or DHS Urban Area Security Initiative (UASI) region, activated to support incident management at incidents that extend beyond one operational period. Type 3 IMTs will respond throughout the state or large portions of the state, depending upon State-specific laws, policies, and regulations.
- Type 2: National and State Level – a federally or state-certified team; has less training, staffing, and experience than Type 1 IMTs and is typically used on smaller scale national or state incidents. There are thirty-five Type 2 IMTs currently in existence. They operate through interagency cooperation of federal, state, and local land and emergency management agencies.
- Type 1: National and State Level – a federally or state-certified team; is the most robust IMT with the most training and experience. Sixteen Type 1 IMTs are now in existence and operate through interagency cooperation of federal, state, and local land and emergency management agencies.

In 2024, the National Multi-Agency Coordinating Group (NMAC) transitioned all Type 1 and Type 2 IMTs to Complex IMTs (CIMTs).

== Roles ==
Incident management teams may be government or private sector personnel with incident management training and certifications. They usually fill the following roles:

- Incident Commander
- Public Information Officer
- Safety Officer
- Operations Section Chief
- Planning Section Chief
- Logistics Section Chief
- Additional support staff as needed

=== Subsystems ===
An IMT consists of five subsystems as follows:

- Incident Command System (ICS) – an on-scene structure of management-level positions suitable for managing any incident;
- Training – including needs identification, development, and delivery of training courses;
- Qualifications and certification – the United States has national standards for qualifications and certification for ICS positions;
- Publications management – the development, control, sourcing, and distribution of National Incident Management System (NIMS) publications provided by the National Wildfire Coordinating Group (NWCG); and
- Supporting technology and systems – technology and materials used to support an emergency response, such as Geographic Information Systems (GIS), orthophoto mapping, National Fire Danger Rating System, remote automatic weather stations, automatic lightning detection systems, infrared technology, and communications.

== See also ==
- Computer security incident management
- Incident management
