= Incident commander =

Person responsible for emergency response

The Incident Commander is the person responsible for all aspects of an emergency response; including quickly developing incident objectives, managing all incident operations, application of resources as well as responsibility for all persons involved. The Incident Commander sets priorities and defines the organization of the incident response teams and the overall incident action plan. The role of Incident Commander may be assumed by senior or higher qualified officers upon their arrival or as the situation dictates. Even if subordinate positions are not assigned, the Incident Commander position will always be designated or assumed. The incident commander may, at their own discretion, assign individuals, who may be from the same agency or from assisting agencies, to subordinate or specific positions for the duration of the emergency.

In the United States, most agencies use an Incident Commander for the roles and responsibilities as defined under the National Incident Management System as a part of the Incident Command System.

== The incident command system in a Canadian EMS scenario ==
- Incident Commander – oversees all operations at the incident.
  - usually one of the first officers on scene.
  - assessment of the scene.
  - establish command as well as command centre.
  - request required resources.
  - initiates triage.
- triage officer – oversees all patient assessment, tagging and movement to treatment areas
- treatment officer – oversees all treatment and the treatment area
- transportation officer – oversees all ambulance movement, priority, identity, and destination of patients.
- staging officer – oversees all acquisition, release and distribution of resources.

== Duties in a US fire-fighting scenario ==
- Obtain briefings and guidelines for level of involvement from requesting agency and/or prior Incident Commander.
- Obtain delegation of authority if requesting agency desires Team to assume operational control and/or under unified command to allow all affected jurisdictions shared responsibility.
- Ensure incident safety.
- Establish Incident Command Post and operational plan if not already accomplished.
- Maintain contact with state fire marshal and ERC.
- Provide other command assistance as requested by agency/jurisdiction.
- Coordinate the multiple aid from interagencies like: USFS, BLM, BIA, state, county, city and volunteer fire/emergency resources.

== See also ==
- Advanced disaster management simulator
- Incident management team
- Incident command post
- Incident command system
- National Incident Management System
