= National Incident Management System =

Multi-agency disaster response model for national civil defense

The National Incident Management System (NIMS) is a standardized approach to incident management developed by the United States Department of Homeland Security. The program was established in March 2004, in response to Homeland Security Presidential Directive-5, issued by President George W. Bush. It is intended to facilitate coordination between all responders (including all levels of government, public, private, and nongovernmental organizations). The system has been revised once, in December 2008. NIMS is the common framework that integrates various capabilities to help achieve objectives.

NIMS defines multiple operational systems, including:

- The Incident Command System
- The Multiagency Coordination System
- The Emergency operations center

== Background ==
NIMS results from 40 years of work to improve incident management interoperability. In the 1970s, different local, state, and Federal agencies got together and created FIRESCOPE, which is the precursor to NIMS. Incident Command System and Multiagency Coordination Systems are both part of FIRESCOPE. In 1982, FIRESCOPE and the NWCG authors created the National Interagency Incident Management System to help make different operational system guidelines applicable to any incident and/or hazard. Many communities adopted the NIIMS, but not everyone did. After 9/11, there was a need for more coordination and clearer communication among agencies, so the DHS started to expand upon FIRESCOPE and NIMS and created the first NIMS document, releasing it in 2004.

== Resource management ==
Identifying and managing resources allows the incident commander to obtain the correct resources as needed. It can also help the IC know that the resources exist and are ready to be deployed.

=== Identifying and typing resources ===
Identifying and Typing resources includes finding them and making sure they are qualified and capable of the job. This process also involves finding out what they are most useful for.

=== Resource management during an incident ===
Resource management during an incident involves keeping track of resources, requesting resources, and demobilizing resources.

=== Mutual aid ===
Mutual aid is when there is a document and/or agreement between jurisdictions to help each other by sending needed resources.

== NIMS management characteristics ==
NIMS runs on 14 principles of management to help incident management run smoother. The 14 principles include:

- Common terminology - communications involve common vocabulary and plain English (i.e. no 10-codes)
- Modular organization - the organizational structure is modular and can be changed as needed to fit the incident's needs.
- Management by objectives - involves creating specific objectives that can be measured to ensure they are being met.
- Incident action planning - incident action plans help guide incident activities.
- Manageable span of control allows supervisors to lead their subordinates on an incident efficiently. The rule of thumb for span of control is one supervisor to five to seven subordinates.
- Incident facilities and locations - depending on the incident, the incident commander may designate areas for facilities such as triage areas, emergency shelters, and incident command posts (ICPs).
- Comprehensive resource management - resources are anything that can help in an incident, including personnel, equipment, supplies, etc. Comprehensive resource management involves keeping an accurate inventory of all available resources.
- Integrated communications are important since multiple agencies and government levels work together. They can involve using communication software such as video conferencing, and common radio frequencies.
- Establishment and transfer of command - at the beginning of any incident, the incident commander should establish the command function and designate where the command post is located. When a command is being transferred, the new incident commander is briefed on the incident action plan and the status of the incident.
- Unified command allows the leaders from multiple agencies to work together as the incident command.
- Chain of command and unity of command - chain of command is the linear format from supervisor to subordinate. Unity of command means that each personnel member reports only to one supervisor.
- Accountability means that every person at an incident is responsible, follows specific guidelines, the check-in/check-out rule, and participates in resource tracking.
- Dispatch/deployment - any resources needed on an incident can only be deployed if they are requested. No resource can self-deploy. If too many resources self-deploy, the incident may end up with too many resources and no place to stage them.
- Information and intelligence management - this principle establishes the process for gathering and processing that information.

== Incident command system ==
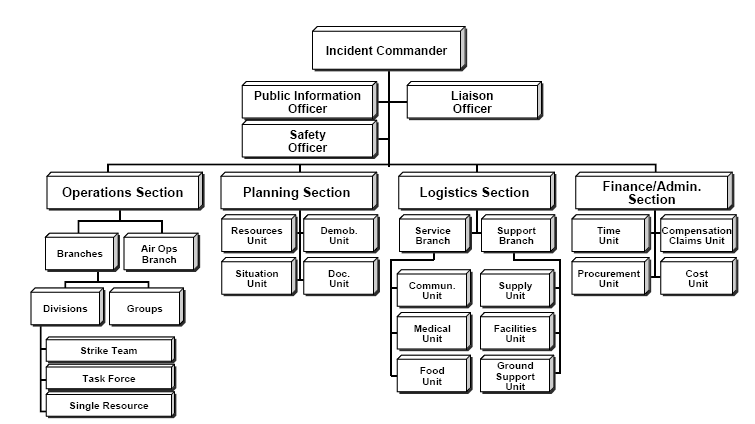
The NIMS incident command structure.

The Incident Command System (ICS) is a standardized, all-hazards, all-incident approach to any incident that allows multiple resources to work together.

=== Command structure ===
The ICS command structure is a modular system that can be expanded or contracted as the incident requires. The unified command structure has multiple staffing positions. The main staff includes Incident command, command staff, and general staff.

==== Incident command ====
Incident command or unified command is in charge of the entire incident and directs its operations.

==== Command staff ====
The command staff help the incident commander with running an incident when the incident becomes bigger than the IC can handle alone. The three positions within the command staff include:

- Public information officer (PIO) is in charge of talking to the public, the media, and any other external entities. They help inform the public about what is happening at the incident, what has happened, and any other information that needs to be disseminated.
- Safety officer is in charge of the safety of the personnel at the incident. They can request medical resources and other resources important to the safety of the incident. They can stop any unsafe behavior on an incident.
- Liaison officer is in charge of giving out information to the personnel and resources at an incident. The liaison officer is also the person that incident personnel may bring their questions to.

==== General staff ====
The General staff do the work like writing incident action plans (IAPs) or requesting and documenting resources. Like command staff, these positions can be filled as needed. The four main general staff positions are:

- Operations section - this section plans and performs the activities important to accomplishing the incident objectives. The operations section also supports the development of the IAP.
- Planning section - this section plans and creates the incident action plan (IAP) on a daily basis.
- Logistics section is in charge of requesting and demobilizing resources. They are also in charge of transportation, supplies, medical support, IT support, food, and other required services during the incident.
- Finance/administration section - this section works on getting the funding needed for the incident, along with taking care of administrative work.

Another general staff position that is not normally added, but can be added if need is the information/intelligence section. As the name suggests, this staff position is in charge of gathering information and intelligence.

== Emergency operations center ==
An emergency operations center (EOC) is where the organizational coordination and support of an incident or emergency is carried out. An EOC is pre-established and represents the municipal, state, county, or regional response to support an Incident command post or multi-agency coordination system (MACS).

== Multi-agency coordination systems ==
The multi-agency coordination system (MACS) allows multiple agencies to work together and allows for coordination, unified command, planning, and resource allocation.

== Communication ==
The communication part of NIMS includes four key principles. They include:

- Interoperability - allows organizations and agencies to communicate across a wide range of media, including, voice, email, video conferencing, other software, etc.
- Reliability, scalability, and portability - any communication must be reliable and be able to be sized based on the needs of the incident.
- Resilience and redundancy - any communication system must be able to provide uninterrupted service, even when normal infrastructure is down, and must be duplicated, should one system go down.
- Security - the communication system must have good security to prevent classified information from leaking out, and to comply with HIPAA.

== Training ==
Federal Emergency Management Agency currently offers core training about NIMS and ICS.

IS-700.B: An Introduction to the National Incident Management System

IS-100.C: Introduction to the Incident Command System

Approximately 14 additional courses are available on selected topics.

== See also ==
- Emergency management
