= New Zealand Fire Service Commission =

New Zealand Crown entity

- Whakaratonga Iwi (Māori)
- Commission documents often were badged as coming from the NZFS or NRFA respectively, however some documents used this unique logo, itself based on the NZFS logo.

Agency overview
- Formed: 1975
- Preceding agency: Fire Service Council
- Dissolved: July 1, 2017
- Superseding agency: Executive Board of FENZ
- Type: Crown agent
- Jurisdiction: New Zealand
- Headquarters: Level 12, 80 The Terrace Wellington 6011
- Minister responsible: Minister of Internal Affairs
- Agency executive: Hon Paul Swain QSO (2017), Chairperson of the Commission
- Parent department: Ministry of Internal Affairs
- Child agencies: New Zealand Fire Service; National Rural Fire Authority
- Website: http://fire.org.nz

The New Zealand Fire Service Commission (Māori: Whakaratonga Iwi) was the New Zealand Crown entity responsible for overseeing firefighting across the country from 1975 to 1 July 2017. The Commission administered the New Zealand Fire Service (NZFS), the nation's urban fire and rescue service, and also acted as the National Rural Fire Authority (NRFA), which oversaw the control of wildfires by coordinating local Rural Fire Authorities. On 30 July 2017, the Commission was dissolved and was replaced with the Board of Fire and Emergency New Zealand - an agency which subsumed both the NZFS and the Rural Fire Authorities and became responsible for both urban and rural firefighting.

== History ==
On Tuesday, 18 November 1947, a fire engulfed the Ballantynes department store in central Christchurch, New Zealand, resulting in the death of 41 people and a Royal Commission of Inquiry being established to investigate; the 1948 report of the commission recommended, amongst other fire safety measures, that a national fire service be formed with a uniform training and assessment programme in order to improve what they saw as serious disorganisation and lack of training in existing provincial brigades. Opposition, centred around fears about increased costs and lack of local control, ultimately stopped the creation of a national fire service, but a Fire Service Council was established in 1949 to ensure the maintenance of efficient fire brigades in urban centres and encourage development and cooperation between these brigades.

While the creation of the Fire Service Council was seen as an important step, issues remained; the level of service provided by brigades across the country continued to vary, with their funding considerably varying depending on local factors such as population and average wealth, leading to many brigades not being able to obtain modern equipment. These issues came to a head in 1973, when poor equipment and coordination hindered the response to the Parnell Fumes Emergency and lead to 41 firefighters being injured by caustic agent used to neutralise the toxic chemicals. Following this, the call for a national fire service was realised with the passage of the Fire Service Act 1975, which established the Commission and its subordinate organs; the New Zealand Fire Service and the National Rural Fire Authority.

== Functions and structure ==
The Fire Service Act 1975 dictated the structure of the Commission, setting the requirements that it must have consisted of 5 members, with at least 1 of those members having experience in either fire engineering or as a senior fire officer, with the other members largely being drawn from the fields of public administration, business, and finance. These members were appointed by the Minister of Internal Affairs and overseen by the State Services Commission. The Commission was forbidden from giving operational direction to members of the NZFS, instead acting through instructions given to the service's Chief Executive.

The powers given to the Commission by the act include:

- Powers exercised by the commission in its role as the National Rural Fire Authority
- General control of the NZFS and its functions and activities
- Ensuring efficient administration of the 1975 act
- Making special provisions for the protection of Crown property
- The appointment and dismissal of the Chief Executive of the NZFS
- The promotion of fire safety
- The registration of volunteer fire brigades as part of the NZFS
- The administration of the Fire Service Levy
- Any other functions conferred on it by the Minister of Internal Affairs

Most of these powers were also delegated to the Chief Executive of the NZFS to act on behalf of the Commission.

=== As the National Rural Fire Authority ===
The 1975 act designates the Commission as the National Rural Fire Authority for the purposes of the Forest and Rural Fires Act; this function was performed by the National Rural Fire Officer, who was appointed jointly by the Commission and the Chief Executive of the NZFS, and their staff. Therefore, while in law the Commission and the NRFA were the same thing, in practice the NRFA acted as a distinct entity subordinate to the Commission.

== See also ==
- Fire and Emergency New Zealand
- List of public sector organisations in New Zealand
- Crown entity
