= List of New Zealand firefighters killed in the line of duty =

This is a list of New Zealand firefighters killed in the line of duty. As of 2020, 66 firefighters have been killed, of which 23 have died while responding to an incident, 35 at incidents, and another 8 during training or routine tasks. There have been four instances of multiple fatality incidents, on 19 January 1921, 10 December 1949, 30 November 2011 and 13 February 2023.

Most of the deaths occurred either in vehicle accidents, or when the firefighter collapsed.

== Firefighters ==
Shaded rows denote when multiple firefighters were killed in a single incident.

Rank	Name	Brigade	Date	Circumstance	Notes
Qualified Firefighter	Craig Stevens	Muriwai	16 February 2023	Died of injuries from a landslide which collapsed a house that he and another firefighter were investigating for flood damage during Cyclone Gabrielle.	
Station Officer	Dave van Zwanenberg	Muriwai	c.13 February 2023	Killed when the house that he and another firefighter were investigating for flood damage collapsed due to a landslide.	
Pilot	Steve Askin		14 February 2017	Killed in helicopter crash while undertaking monsoon operations on Port Hills Fire	
Ranger	William Macrae	Department of Conservation	30 November 2011	Killed when helicopter crashed during firefighting operations on Karikari Peninsula	
Pilot	John Edwin de Ridder	Kerikeri	30 November 2011	Killed when helicopter crashed during firefighting operations on Karikari Peninsula	
Firefighter	Barry Keen	Willowby	8 April 2009	Killed after being hit by a falling branch	
Firefighter	Ray Barrett	Hicks Bay	28 December 2008	Fire truck rolled while responding to a car crash.	
Senior Station Officer	Derek Lovell	Hamilton	6 April 2008	Killed during Tamahere Coolstore incident	
Operational Support Station Officer	Ken Brougham	Rangiora	23 April 2006	Collapsed while responding to a call-out	
Firefighter	Roly Webb	Waipukurau	23 March 2005	Collapsed while attending a car fire	
Chief Fire Officer	David Ashton Neil	Tirau	1 June 2002	Killed in motor vehicle accident responding to an incident	
Firefighter	Grant Judd	Foxton Beach	17 June 2001	Killed when the appliance he was travelling in lost traction on a slippery road surface and rolled over	
Senior Firefighter	Murray Charles Boyd	Akaroa	1 February 2001	Collapsed during breathing apparatus training	
Firefighter	Kieran O'Hanlon	Morrinsville	19 March 2000	A 17-year-old firefighter killed when the water tanker he was a passenger in crashed down a bank on the way to a scrub fire.	
Firefighter	Benjamin Payne	RNZAF Ohakea	6 June 1999	Killed in motor vehicle accident while on duty	
Fire Officer	Paul Gable	Mosgiel	6 May 1999	Collapsed during a training session	
	John Reesink	Kumeu	3 June 1998	Collapsed while attending an MVA	
Chief Fire Officer	Jim Measures	Waihi	19 May 1998	Collapsed in the fire appliance responding to a logging truck accident	
	David Sloan	Waipukurau	21 January 1996		
Firefighter	James Hughes	Auckland	9 July 1994	Killed by a drunken driver whilst operation the pump at the scene of another motor vehicle accident on an Auckland Motorway	
Chief Fire Officer	Jim Jamieson	Waitarere	24 November 1993	Collapsed at home following a brigade exercise	
Station Officer	John Agnew	Woodville	7 July 1993	Died after the appliance he was driving left a narrow rural road and rolled down a steep bank after attending a small fire	
Trainee Firefighter	John Scott	Auckland	3 May 1989	Collapsed during a BA training exercise	
	John William Super	Portobello	13 December 1986	Died at the scene of a fire	
Senior Station Officer	George James Oliver	Twizel	3 October 1981	Struck by competition box propelled by gale-force winds	
Deputy Captain	John Fordyce	Wellington	22 June 1975	Collapsed at training	
Fireman	William Robinson	Foxton	20 January 1969	Struck by a car while responding to the station on his bicycle	
Chief Fire Officer	Matthew Morton	Wanganui	19 February 1968	Collapsed while attending a house fire	
Chief Fire Officer	Jack Wilkin Morriss	Cambridge	24 November 1965	Collapsed after leaving a smoke filled room at a house fire	
Senior Station Officer	Ernest John Powell	Christchurch	11 January 1965	Collapsed at a scrub fire	
Fireman	Irvin Heppinstall	Cambridge	29 November 1964	Collapsed during training	
Senior Fireman	Noel Mathieson	Auckland	28 July 1963	Collapsed at a house fire	
Fireman	Robert Cox	Tawa	16 September 1963	Fell from a moving appliance	
Fireman	Thomas McCambridge	Invercargill	20 January 1959	Collapsed while involved in the rescue of three council workers overcome by fumes when working in an artesian bore, none of whom survived	
Senior Fireman	William Strong	Christchurch	10 July 1957	Collapsed on the road outside a burning timber factory	
Deputy Chief Fire Officer	Lenorad Goodman	New Plymouth	18 May 1957	Became trapped in a burning basement and an attempted rescue was unsuccessful	
Senior Foreman	William Griffen	Gisborne	12 October 1955	Collapsed while en route to a fire call	
Fireman	Leslie Newman	Manaia	4 October 1955	Killed when the appliance left the road and rolled while being taken on a routine run	
Fireman	James Edwin Waters	Kaitangata	29 September 1955	Collapsed while attending a fire	
Fireman	Albert Clark	Auckland	10 December 1949	Killed when the appliance they were riding, whilst responding to a shed fire, collided with a telegraph pole and capsized	
Fireman	George L. Oliver	Auckland	10 December 1949	Killed when the appliance they were riding, whilst responding to a shed fire, collided with a telegraph pole and capsized	
Station Officer	Ernest Herring	Auckland	17 September 1947	Collapsed whilst in command at a furniture factory fire	
Fireman	Victor Hugo	Auckland	2 March 1945	Killed when the appliance he was driving collided with a two—ton truck	
Fireman	Jim Winton	Wellington	5 November 1944	One of four firefighters overcome by carbon monoxide while fighting an industrial fire, and died in hospital four days later	
Fireman	Eric Bright	Auckland	15 November 1943	Trapped in a ship when he could not find his exit route after the fire flared up	
Fireman	William Molloy	Bluff	25 October 1938	Electrocuted while attending a fire at two shops	
Foreman	Alexander Hird	Wanganui	1 January 1931	Collapsed while attending a house fire	
Fireman	Roland Beuth	Auckland	2 April 1928	During a fire at the Winston Oil and Petrol Store petrol drums exploded and hurtled through the air, one landing close to Fireman Beuth's crew, engulfing them in flames. Fireman Beuth died the following day	
Fireman	A. C. Allan	New Plymouth	24 September 1926	Collapsed while attending a paintshop fire	
Station Officer	Joshua Noblett	Christchurch	15 June 1925	Pinned under an appliance that was overturned following a collision with a car en route to a car fire	
Deputy Superintendent	Jules Emil LeScelle	Devonport	4 April 1924	Truck crashed on Calliope Road on its way to a call, which turned out to be a malicious false alarm. Two other firemen and a local constable were seriously injured.	
Fireman	Herbert Graham	Hamilton	19 January 1921	Killed when the appliance they were responding rolled after attempting to avoid an oncoming truck which would not give way	
Fireman	George Prince	Hamilton	19 January 1921	Killed when the appliance they were responding rolled after attempting to avoid an oncoming truck which would not give way	
Fireman	Robert Baxter	Dunedin	16 May 1918	Killed whilst responding to what turned out to be a false alarm when the appliance lost traction on a greasy surface and flipped onto its side	
Fireman	Michael Donnelly	Napier	28 May 1917	Died from burns sustained from the Te Anau Steamer Ship fire	
Fireman	Richard Henry Ridings	Devonport	26 December 1913	Died at a large fire at Clarence Street in Devonport. He collapsed and died of stroke while working the standpipe.	
Third Officer	William Robert Mclean-Field	Wellington	14 April 1912	Electrocuted after a ladder came into contact with high-tension wires at an inner-city fire	
Fireman	Douglas Williamson	Feilding	5 October 1909	Died from injuries sustained from falling debris at the Hastie's Hotel Fire	
Fireman	Arnold Gladding	Auckland	23 July 1904	One of three firefighters injuring by a collapsing brick wall at a large warehouse fire	
Custodian	George Parker	New Plymouth	16 November 1902	Died from a tetanus infection after stepping on a nail while battling a blaze	
Fireman	Benjamin Berry	Christchurch	16 February 1901	Slipped and fell under the back wheels of a responding appliance after trying unsuccessfully to board it	
Engineer	William Abbott	Christchurch	6 October 1900	Collapsed while driving an appliance to a fire	
Senior Foreman	James Lawrence	Wellington	10 May 1898	Died from injuries sustained when his appliance collided with a steam roller en route to a fire	
Fireman	Skakesley	Dunedin	17 October 1894	Collapsed while fighting a fire aboard the Mararoa Ship, Dunedin Port	
Fireman	Roberson	Dunedin	10 May 1883		
Assistant Engineer	Alfred Hillier	Christchurch	3 August 1883	Thrown from a turning appliance en route to an alarm on 29 July.	
Fireman	William Godwin	Auckland	3 January 1878	Died from injuries in an accident at the fire that broke out at the Rising Sun Hotel on Karangahape Road	
Fireman	John Guilford	Wellington	22 August 1872	Slipped and broke his back while fighting a ship fire, and died shortly after from his injuries	
