= NZFSC =

NZFSC is an acronym that may refer to:

- New Zealand Fire Service Commission
- New Zealand Financial Services Council
