= Fire and Emergency New Zealand =

National fire and emergency service of New Zealand

- Whakaratonga Iwi

Operational area
- Country: New Zealand

Agency overview
- Established: 1 July 2017 (9 years ago)
- Annual calls: 87,383 (2021-22
- Employees: 4,098 (2021-22)
- Annual budget: $616.19-$617.88 million
- Staffing: Total firefighters: 10,468; Career: 1,767; Volunteer: 8,701
- Chief executive officer: Darry Purdy (acting)

Facilities and equipment
- Stations: 637

Website
- fireandemergency.nz

Fire and Emergency New Zealand is New Zealand's main firefighting and emergency services body.

Fire and Emergency was formally established on 1 July 2017, after the New Zealand Fire Service, the National Rural Fire Authority, and 38 rural fire districts and territorial authorities amalgamated to form one new organization. It has nationwide responsibility for fire safety, firefighting, hazardous substance incident response, vehicle extrication and urban search and rescue.

== History ==
=== Predecessors ===
New Zealand's first volunteer fire brigade was established in 1854 by Asher Asher, a Jewish emigrant from London, in Auckland, with volunteer fire brigades established in Christchurch in 1860, Dunedin in 1861, and in Wellington in 1865. The Municipal Corporations Act 1867 allowed borough councils to establish fire brigades and appoint fire inspectors, starting the first paid fire brigades. The Fire Brigades Act 1906 set up local fire boards, and required the central government, local authorities, and insurance companies to cover costs.

During the summer of 1945/46, a large scrub and forest fire threatened the town of Taupō and blocked the Rotorua–Taupō Road. In response, the Forest and Rural Fires Act 1947 established the modern rural firefighting force.

On 18 November 1947, Christchurch's Ballantynes department store was gutted by fire, killing 41 employees. The resulting Royal Commission of Inquiry found that the store's evacuation scheme was inadequate, the fire brigade was slow to be informed of the fire, and the firefighters were not properly trained or equipped. The Commission proposed a national fire service, however this was rejected. The Fire Services Act 1949 instead set up the Fire Service Council to coordinate urban fire brigades, direct firefighter training and distribute equipment. In 1958, the first national training school for firefighters was established. On 29 September 1958, the first 111 emergency telephone service was introduced, covering Masterton and Carterton, and was gradually expanded nationwide through the 1960s and 1970s.

=== Centralisation and mergers, 1975–present ===
The Fire Service Act 1975 replaced the Fire Service Council with a new Fire Service Commission, and merged local fire boards and urban volunteer fire brigades into a single entity, the New Zealand Fire Service.

The Forest and Rural Fires Act 1977 established the National Rural Fire Authority under the New Zealand Fire Service Commission to coordinate the various rural fire authorities.

Fire and Emergency was formally established on 1 July 2017, merging the New Zealand Fire Service, the National Rural Fire Authority, and 38 rural fire districts and territorial authorities.

=== Controversies ===
An independent report by Judge Coral Shaw into the culture of Fire and Emergency New Zealand, released in January 2019, found a widespread culture of bullying and harassment, including sexism and racism. The Chief Executive of Fire and Emergency noted the report was "wide ranging and confronting."

In September 2026, Minister of Internal Affairs Minister Brooke van Velden declined to express confidence in the organisation's chief executive Kerry Gregory after he withheld information from her and FENZ's leadership board for a year about a "seriously significant issue." The matter was also referred to the Serious Fraud Office. In October 2026, Kerry Gregory resigned saying following the comments from van Velden, it was "untenable" for him to remain.

On 17 November 2026, FENZ abandoned a controversial restructure announced in November 2025 which had proposed laying off 140 jobs and changing about 700 roles among its 3,000 staff. This decision was welcomed by both the Public Service Association and the New Zealand Professional Firefighters Union (NZPFU). In return, the NZPFU abandoned plans to launch two ten-hour strikes on 27 November and 2 December and agreed to work with FENZ to improve work culture and resolve disagreements.

== Governance ==
Fire and Emergency is a Crown entity and is governed by a Crown Appointed Board. The Minister for Internal Affairs is the minister responsible for Fire and Emergency. The CEO is appointed by the State Services Commissioner. The Executive Leadership Team is responsible for service delivery and implementation in accordance with the Fire and Emergency Act.

== Roles and functions ==
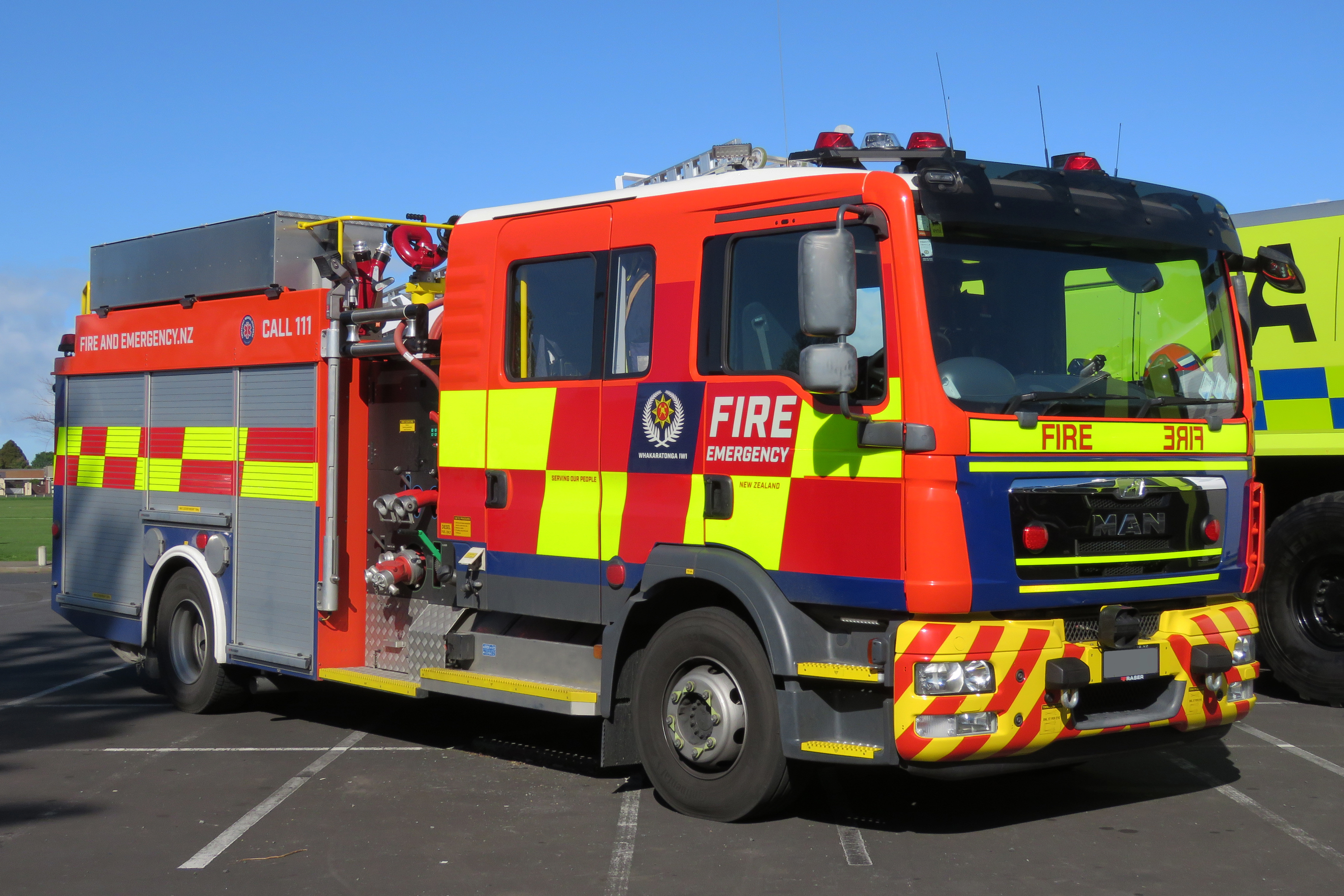
Fire and Emergency New Zealand MAN Type 3 Appliance

The main functions of Fire and Emergency are those where it has responsibility to respond, and has lead responsibility in a multi-agency emergency. These include:

- firefighting
- fire safety and prevention
- Hazardous Materials (HAZMAT) – the containment of a hazardous substance and decontamination of an environment or persons affected by a hazardous substance.
- vehicle extrication – extrication of entrapped persons in the aftermath of a motor vehicle accident
- urban search and rescue (USAR) – Fire and Emergency NZ is the lead agency for New Zealand USAR operations (Civil Defence & Emergency Management Act 2002) They also manage three USAR Task Force level teams, providing communications and resources. Being the lead agency, Fire and Emergency NZ also coordinates the 17 NZ Response Teams when tasked to provide light USAR support. Paid career firefighters have a baseline level of training in USAR techniques and make up the vast majority of the actual USAR team members.

Fire and Emergency also has a number of additional functions which it may assist in, but not at the compromise of its main functions. These are typically functions where another agency has lead responsibility in a multi-agency emergency. These additional function include:

- medical first response – responding to medical emergencies in smaller communities where there is no local ambulance service, as well as in the main centres when an ambulance is unavailable or will be significantly delayed in attending an incident.
- medical co-response – co-responding with ambulance services to "Code Purple" emergencies (e.g. cardiac and respiratory arrest)
- rescue (high angle line, confined spaces, swift water, etc.) – rescue from the side of buildings; dangerous terrain (cliff/rock faces, etc.)
- natural disaster response – addressing the problems caused by heavy rain and high winds (lifted roofing, power lines and trees down onto properties or across roadways, flooding)

Fire and Emergency's jurisdiction covers the majority of New Zealand's land mass. The Department of Conservation is no longer responsible for fires as Fire and Emergency are the fire authority for all public conservation land. DOC support Fire and Emergency in this function. This means that any fire that starts or develops on public conservation land will be controlled by Fire and Emergency under their authority, and DOC will support them. New Zealand Defence Force are responsible for fire services covering the land under their control. Industry fire brigades provide fire services to certain facilities, such as major airports and industrial plants. Fire and Emergency provides mutual assistance to these brigades.

== Staffing ==
=== Volunteers ===
The majority of firefighters are volunteers, who receive no payment for their time or labour. 12,068 Rural and Urban Volunteer firefighters mainly serve small towns, communities and outer suburbs which career stations do not cover. Volunteer brigades responded to 43% of all incidents Fire and Emergency attended in 2024.

=== Career staff ===
Fire and Emergency New Zealand employ 1,779 career (paid) firefighters as well as 1,292 management and support staff. Career firefighters make up roughly 14% of Fire and Emergency's frontline manpower.

Each career fire station has a number of watches (shifts). Full-time career stations have four watches, red, brown, blue and green, rotating on a "four-on four-off" schedule: two 10-hour day shifts, followed by two 14-hour night shifts, followed by four days off. Combination stations staffed by both career and volunteer personnel sometimes included a “Yellow Watch,” in which career staff work four 10-hour day shifts per week, with one weekday, Saturday, and Sunday off. Non-operational personnel are referred to as “Black Watch” and work standard 40-hour weeks.

Career firefighter numbers have remained relatively stable, with low turnover. Fire and Emergency usually conducts recruitment twice a year, attracting as many as 700 applications for around 48 positions per intake. Competition is therefore intense, and the likelihood of appointment is comparatively low. Successful candidates complete a 12-week residential training programme at the National Training Centre in Rotorua. This programme covers core firefighting skills as well as modern specialist disciplines, including urban search and rescue (USAR), motor vehicle extrication, and hazardous materials response.

Career firefighters also provide personnel for Fire and Emergency’s national USAR response teams. While these members receive additional specialist training, all career firefighters are trained to a baseline USAR “Responder” level.

=== Ranks and insignia ===
The epaulette markings used by Fire and Emergency are similar to those used by the New Zealand Police and the New Zealand Army, except for the use of impellers instead of pips and bars in place of chevrons. The current colour scheme for helmets was rolled out in late 2013, with the intention to make it easier to identify the command structure at a large-scale, multi-agency incident.

Title	Epaulette	Cap	Gorgets	Helmet	Approximate equivalent	
Title	Epaulette	Cap	Gorgets	Helmet	LFB	FDNY
National Commander		Two rows of laurel leaves	Black oak leaves on a red background (also worn on the shirt in working dress)	Black helmet with a label reading National Commander	Commissioner	Chief of Department
Deputy National Commander		Two rows of laurel leaves	Black oak leaves on a red background (also worn on the shirt in working dress	Black helmet with a label reading Deputy National Commander		
Assistant National Commander		Two rows of laurel leaves	Black oak leaves on a red background (also worn on the shirt in working dress)	Silver helmet, two blue bands and a label reading Assistant National Commander	Assistant Commissioner	Assistant Chief
District Manager/ Commander		Two rows of laurel leaves	Black oak leaves on a red background	Silver helmet with one blue band and a label reading Commander/District Manager	Group Commander	Division Chief
Group Manager/ Assistant Commander		One row of laurel leaves	Red oak leaves on a black background	Plain Silver helmet with a label reading Assistant Commander/Group Manager	Station Commander	Battalion Chief
Chief Fire Officer (Volunteer)		Two rows of laurel leaves	Red oak leaves on a black background	White helmet, two blue bands and a label reading Chief Fire Officer	Station Commander	Battalion Chief
Deputy Chief Fire Officer (Volunteer)		One row of laurel leaves	Red oak leaves on a black background	White helmet with one blue band and a label reading Deputy Chief Fire Officer	—N/a	—N/a
Senior Station Officer		Plain	None	Red helmet with two blue bands or Blue helmet with two yellow bands (Operational Support)	Station Officer	Captain
Station Officer		Plain	None	Red helmet with one blue band or Blue helmet with one yellow band (Operational Support)	Sub-Officer	Lieutenant
Senior Firefighter		Plain	None	Yellow helmet with two red bands or Blue helmet with two red bands (Operational Support)	Leading Firefighter	Firefighter
Qualified Firefighter		Plain	None	Yellow helmet with one red stripe or Blue helmet with one red stripe (Operational Support)	Firefighter	Firefighter
Firefighter		Plain	None	Plain Yellow helmet or Plain Blue helmet (Operational Support)	Firefighter	Firefighter
Recruit Firefighter	Blank with 'RECRUIT'	Plain	None	Fluorescent green helmet with black crest	—N/a	Probationary Firefighter

== Appliances and vehicles ==
The basic urban appliance in New Zealand is the Pump Tender and the Pump Rescue Tender. The Pump Tender is primarily equipped for fires, while the Pump Rescue Tender is additionally equipped with rescue equipment for motor vehicle accidents and vehicle extrication.

Class	Chassis make and model	Body manufacturer	Number (as of Feb 2021)	Image
Type 1 "Light" Pump	Iveco Eurocargo Volvo FL	Fraser Fire & Rescue, Lower Hutt	352	
Type 2 "Medium" Pump	Iveco Eurocargo	Fraser Fire & Rescue, Lower Hutt	250	
Type 3 "Heavy" Pump	MAN TGM; Scania P-series	Emergency One Group, Scotland; Angloco Ltd, United Kingdom; Fraser Fire & Rescue, Lower Hutt, Mills-Tui, Rotorua	250	
Type 4 "Heavy Aerial" Pump	Scania P-series	Fraser Fire & Rescue, Lower Hutt	18	
Type 5 Hydraulic Elevating Platform	Mercedes Benz 2633 Scania P-series	Bronto Skylift, Tampere, Finland	5	
Type 6 Turntable Ladder	Spartan Charger Scania P-series	Lowes Industries, Christchurch	2	
Ultralight Pump	Mitsubishi Fuso Canter	Mills-Tui, Rotorua	17	
Rural Medium Appliance	Isuzu FSS-500	Lockheed Martin	150	
Rural Large Appliance	Isuzu JCS 420		29	
Water Tanker	Scania P-series; Volvo FM; Hino 500	Tanker Engineering, Auckland; Mills-Tui, Rotorua; Fraser Fire & Rescue, Lower Hutt; Lowes Industries, Christchurch; Promax, Kerikeri	167	
Hazmat / Command Unit	DAF LF	Custom Motorbodies, Auckland	18	
Incident Support Vehicle	Iveco Eurocargo; Mitsubishi Fuso Canter Hino 500	Mills-Tui, Rotorua	10	
Light Response Vehicle	Iveco Daily	SPEL, Trentham	8	
Hose Layer	Hino 500	Hale Motorbodies, Lower Hutt	4	
Command Unit	Mitsubishi FP270		1	
Foam Tender	Mitsubishi Fuso Canter; Scania P-series	Aviation Fire Services; Fraser Fire & Rescue	2	
BA Tender	Iveco Eurocargo; Mitsubishi FP270	Custom Motorbodies, Auckland; Mills-Tui, Rotorua	2	
Lighting Unit	Isuzu Forward; Hino FD	Tanker, Engineering; Custom Motorbodies, Auckland	2	
Hazmat Unit	Mitsubishi FK	Unknown	1	
Salvage Tender	Iveco Eurocargo, Isuzu Elf	Custom Motorbodies, Auckland	2	

=== Vehicle callsigns ===
Operational Fire and Emergency vehicles have a three-digit or four-digit callsign. The first two numbers represent the station the vehicle is based at, while the last one or two digits represent the vehicle function and designation. For example, Auckland City fire station's main appliance is Auckland City 207: "20" is the designation for Auckland City station and "7" represents the type of appliance – a pump rescue tender.

This is a list of commonly encountered appliance callsigns (the letter, in this case, meaning the appliance type):

Pump types 1 through 3, for example 831 (the main pump appliance at East Coast Bays Station). xx1 is usually a station's primary pump, and xx2 is almost always a secondary pump. Pumps are somewhat limited in their specialised firefighting abilities, for example, highrise firefighting or forestry firefighting. In terms of local fires, like a small house fire or car fire, the pump has more than enough equipment to suffice. A type 3 heavy pump, mainly found in larger cities with career crews, carries about 1500 litres of water, whereas a smaller type 1 or 2, light and medium respectively, each carry about 2000 litres, as these trucks usually respond to incidents in areas with unreticulated water supplies. The former contains much more equipment, as career firefighters receive much more training, whereas volunteers receive less at a national level. This means that career firefighters have a much higher overall skill and training level. One example of this is that a type three has two High-Pressure Deliveries (HPD), whereas a type 1 or 2 only has one; an HPD is a high-pressure hose, which unravels from the truck directly. The HPD is usually one of the first pieces of equipment used at a firefighting event.

== Notable incidents ==
Major notable incidents where Fire and Emergency or its predecessors have played a significant role include:

- Auckland Central fire, 1858 – a fire broke out in central Auckland, eventually destroying an entire city block.
- Parliament Buildings fire, 1907 – a fire broke out around 2 a.m. on 11 December 1907. The building could not be saved.
- Seacliff Lunatic Asylum fire, 1942 – on the evening of 8 December 1942, a fire broke out in Ward 5 at the Seacliff Lunatic Asylum, north of Dunedin, killing 28 of the 39 female patients housed within. A shortage of nursing staff due to World War II, as well as the lack of sprinklers in the ward, contributed to the deaths.
- Ballantyne's fire, 1947 – on 18 November 1947, a fire broke out at the Ballantyne's department store in central Christchurch, killing 41 people. It remains the deadliest fire in New Zealand.
- Sprott House fire, 1969 – on 26 July 1969, a fire broke out at the Sprott House rest home in Karori, Wellington, killing seven of the 21 residents. As a result, the Fire Safety (Evacuation of Buildings) Regulations 1970 were made, making sprinklers, automatic alarms and evacuation schemes compulsory for institutions housing more than 20 people.
- ICI Riverview fire, 1984 – on 21 December 1984, a fire broke out at the ICI Riverview chemical warehouse in Mount Wellington, Auckland, killing one person. Thirty-one firefighters suffered ill effects from the toxic fumes given out in the fire.
- Avondale College fire, 1990 – on the evening of 10 April 1990, a fire broke out at Avondale College in Auckland, destroying the administration block, assembly hall, gymnasium, and thirteen classrooms. At its peak, 200 firefighters and 26 fire appliances fought the blaze.
- Wither Hills fire, 2000 – the main fire, which broke out in the Wither Hills behind Blenheim, swept across more than 6500ha, destroying farmland and wiping out stock.
- Tamahere coolstore fire, 2008 – on 5 April 2008, Hamilton firefighters were called out to a fire alarm activation at the Icepak Coolstores southeast of the city at Tamahere. While investigating the cause of the alarm, the propane-based refrigerant ignited explosively, injuring all eight firefighters and destroying one fire engine. One firefighter, Senior Station Officer Derek Lovell, later died in hospital as a result of his injuries. The fire was upgraded to a fifth-alarm response, with appliances coming from as far afield as Onehunga and Taupō. A water tender from nearby Hamilton Airport and Fonterra milk tankers were also called in to assist with water supply. Icepak Coolstores, and the refrigeration company contracted to maintain the coolstores, pleaded guilty to health and safety breaches, and were ordered to pay $393,000 in fines and reparation combined.
- Southdown Freezing Works fire, 2008 – on 20 December 2008, Auckland firefighters were called out to a reported building fire in the suburb of Southdown. Upon crews arriving, a call was made to transmit a sixth-alarm response. Almost every crew from all over Auckland responded with at least two appliances coming from Rotorua and Hamilton. There was suspected asbestos inside some of the buildings that were alight, causing it to feed the fire.
- Port Hills fire, 2017 – on the evening of 13 February 2017, two separate fires, several kilometres apart, started on the Port Hills near Christchurch. The two fires merged on 15 February and by the time the fire was brought under control on 19 February, it had burned over 2000 hectares of land and destroyed 11 houses. One helicopter crashed while helping to fight the fires, causing the death of the pilot.
- Pigeon Valley fire, 2019 – on the afternoon of 5 February 2019, a fire broke out in a paddock in Pigeon Valley near Wakefield. The fire doubled in size overnight. At its height, it covered 2400 hectares, and was the largest wildfire seen in New Zealand in sixty years. It prompted the declaration of a state of emergency. By 6 February it had been brought under control, with the fire extinguished on the surface for some time but, by 14 February 133 homes were still off limits with residents unable to return. Fire crews continued working on underground hot spots into March. One helicopter crashed during the course of the fire injuring its pilot. It is believed to be the largest wildfire in New Zealand history.
- New Zealand International Convention Centre fire, 2019 – at approximately 13:15 on 22 October 2019, a fire started on the roof of the under-construction International Convention Centre in downtown Auckland. With strong winds gusting through the city, the fire grew rapidly and by 15:30 had escalated up to a sixth alarm; the first time since 2008's Southdown fire that this alarm level had been used. The fire was officially declared "under control" by Fire and Emergency late on the afternoon of 23 October, but flare-ups continued until the evening of 28 October. Finally, the fire was declared to be extinguished after 10 days of firefighting and overhaul.
- Loafers Lodge fire, 2023 – at 12:25 a.m. on 16 May 2023, a fire started in Loafers Lodge in Wellington, killing multiple residents of the lodge.
- Port Hills fire, 2024 – at approximately 14:15 on 14 February 2024, a fire started in the Port Hills close to the location of the 2017 Port Hills fire. Firefighting operations continued for several weeks, although the fire was largely put out within a few days. At its height, it covered over 650 hectares, causing a widespread power outage and leading to a state of emergency being declared.
- Abilities' Group Recycling Plant, 2025 – at approximately 17:03 on 24 April 2025, a large fire started at the Abilities Group Recycling facility in Glenfield, Auckland. The fire involved lithium-ion batteries, causing a chemical reaction that issued toxic smoke and sent fireball explosions into the air, prompting a "stay indoors" order to be issued across the city. The incident also saw multiple equipment failures of Fire and Emergency New Zealand, resulting in firefighters trapped above flames who had to be rescued. Fire crews from as far as Hamilton responded to the fire, which reached a fifth alarm level. Fire crews remained on scene until the next day, extinguishing the fire.
- Fire at Auckland's Northcote College, 2026 - on Friday 20 February, Fire and Rescue were called at around 12:17 PM during a one-hour strike by the New Zealand Professional Firefighters Union (NZPFU), similar to a case in January where, during a strike, a fire engulfed a family owned grocery store in Pakuranga. The fire originated in the 121-year-old pavilion, listed by Auckland Council as a "category A heritage building", meaning it had outstanding historical and aesthetic significance to the school. It took the first volunteer Silverdale crew about 17 minutes to arrive at the school, while the first career firefighters arrived at 1:13 pm. The fire service is now investigating the cause of the fire.

== Public safety campaigns ==
A television campaign in 2002, named "Speed of Fire" had multiple clips of a house fire which were spread throughout an advertisement break, showing how fires spread in real time. It showed how house fires can fill a house in less than three minutes, which is about the same duration of advertisement breaks. The advertisement break started with a mother dropping a cigarette in her chair after leaving the room for the television break, and at the end of the television break, the house was engulfed in flames. It received a "Best use of television" award at the Cannes Lions International Festival of Creativity. There was also a 2012 version where the mother placed a clothes rack in front of a heater.

In 2012, the Fire Service had a campaign with the slogan "Could you live with yourself?". The goal was to decrease the number of fire-related injuries and fatalities by increasing the number of working smoke alarms in the homes of New Zealand. It put attention to the fact that house fires can lead to long-lasting health consequences, not just death, and featured a father who did not have working fire alarms, causing his daughter to be permanently scarred after a house fire. It has been described as one of New Zealand's most "tear-jerking ads".

Between 15 April and the end of June in 2020, an 30-second advertisement campaign on YouTube, TVNZ+ and digital billboards was rolled out. It was called "Switch off before you walk off", featuring four people cooking who eventually got distracted by children, television, phone calls and tiredness and left their cooking unattended, causing a house fire.

In 2021, a three-minute television advertisement was carried out, taking up the entire advertisement break on television. It featured a family trying to escape their house, focusing on the need for an escape plan and how a house fire can become deadly in three minutes. Between 25 and 28 October, a three-step escape plan campaign was on television, TVNZ+ and radio, encouraging people to create an escape plan in three minutes – create a first escape route, a second escape route, and a meeting place.

Throughout March and April 2021, an advertisement was created by FCB for Fire and Emergency NZ with the message "Firefighters Don’t Like Fire Movies", saying that fires in the real world spread much faster than in movies, which means that people do not have the time to plan the heroic escapes seen in film. There was also a Te Reo version for Whakaata Māori.

Between 27 November 2022 and 7 January 2023, Fire and Emergency NZ rolled out a social media advertising campaign named "You're cooked", where people under the influence of alcohol cook recipes given to them. It had the goal of teaching people how easy it is to start a fire while intoxicated.

On 15 August 2023, Fire and Emergency NZ a carried out a controlled house fire live on the Seven Sharp television show with the purpose of teaching viewers about dangers of lithium-ion batteries and how quickly fires spread. The fire was started from an electric scooter, and the house, Levin, had been designated for demolition before the broadcast.

== Educational Programs ==
Fire and Emergency NZ offers curriculum-aligned fire safety programmes tailored to primary and early childhood settings, delivered by teachers and kaiako across Aotearoa. For Years 1–2, Get Firewise provides cross-curricular content, helping five and six-year-olds identify fire hazards, close doors, implement escape routes, and practice a three-step escape plan. Some resources provided by the Department include teacher guides, storybooks, stickers, certificates, and structured firefighter visits to reinforce learning.

In Māori-medium settings, Māui‑tinei‑ahi adapts these outcomes to reflect Te Marautanga o Aotearoa and Te Aho Matua, with culturally grounded materials and te reo presentation delivered by firefighters and Pou Takawaenga Māori. For early childhood (ages 2–5), Get Out! Stay Out! introduces children and whānau to home fire safety. It covers fast fire spread, smoke alarms, firefighting gear, and emergency shouting through simple, take-home activities aligned with Te Whāriki. Its Māori counterpart for kōhanga reo, E Puta! E Noho ki Waho!, mirrors this approach in te reo Māori.

=== Effectiveness ===
Evaluations of these programmes found that students had 96% greater awareness, 91% better engagement in schools, and 65% uptake in ECE/kōhanga reo. These programmes also often incorporate firefighter visits. Other outcomes include greater whānau awareness and good retention of messages like “tools not toys.” However, only half undertook formal assessments, indicating room for further development.

== See also ==
- List of New Zealand firefighters killed in the line of duty
