= National Rural Fire Authority =

Defunct fire service organisation in New Zealand

- Te mana ahi manaha o te motu (Māori)

Agency overview
- Formed: 1977
- Dissolved: 2017
- Superseding agency: Executive Board of FENZ
- Jurisdiction: New Zealand
- Motto: "He kura whenua e kore rawa e ngaro" (A protected New Zealand landscape)
- Minister responsible: Minister of Internal Affairs
- Agency executives: Hon Paul Swain QSO (2017), Chairperson of the NZFSC; Kevin O'Connor (2017), National Rural Fire Officer
- Parent department: New Zealand Fire Service Commission
- Website: www.nrfa.org.nz

The National Rural Fire Authority (Māori: Te mana ahi manaha o te motu) was a firefighting organisation in New Zealand from 1977 to 2017. It was responsible for overseeing the control of wildfires across the country by coordinating the activities of local Rural Fire Authorities. On 1 July 2017, it was merged with the RFAs and the New Zealand Fire Service to form Fire and Emergency New Zealand, who from then on had responsibility of the control of both urban and rural fires.

== History ==
Prior to 1947, wildfire firefighting was not the official domain of any agency, except in state forests, where the New Zealand Forest Service was responsible for fire control. On the 7th of February 1946, a major wildfire broke out near Taupō in the central North Island; the ensuing fires burnt over 250,000 acres of land, including around 30,000 acres of forestry company plantation.

In response, the government passed the Forest and Rural Fire Act of 1947, establishing three types of Rural Fire Authority: gazetted rural fire districts, soil conservation districts, and county councils. Notably however, the Forest Service was not bound by the new duties of the act, instead being bound by the separate Forests Act 1921; this was highlighted following the Balmoral Forest Fire of 1955, leading to the Forest and Rural Fires Act 1955, bringing fire control duties under one act.

By 1977, it had become clear that the previous acts were no longer fit for purpose; of the 114 rural fire districts gazetted since the 1947 act, only 17 remained, and the enquiry into the 1972 Mount White wildfire highlighted poorly defined responsibilities and a lack of communication and coordination between different wildfire agencies. In response, the Forest and Rural Fire Act of 1977 was passed, establishing the role of the National Rural Fire Authority, as well as more clearly defining the roles of RFAs.

== Functions and structure ==
The National Rural Fire Authority was a small and decentralised organisation, consisting of a small core of staff at National Headquarters and five Managers Rural Fire in Auckland, Napier, Palmerston North, Christchurch and Dunedin.

The Fire Service Act 1975 designates the NZ Fire Service Commission as the National Rural Fire Authority for the purposes of the Forest and Rural Fires Act; this function was performed by the National Rural Fire Officer, who was appointed jointly by the Commission and the Chief Executive of the NZFS, and their staff. Therefore, while in law the Commission and the NRFA were the same thing, in practice the NRFA acted as a distinct entity subordinate to the Commission. The act outlines the principle functions of the NRFA as:

- Advising the Minister of Internal Affairs as to rural fire matters
- Coordinating all matters related to national rural fire control
- Consulting with national RFAs and organisations representing local RFAs
- Promoting research, education, and training in rural fire control
- Operating a national rural fire weather system to monitor rural fire danger
- Providing grant assistance to RFAs
- Administering the Rural Firefighting Fund
- Setting and monitoring standards for RFAs

== Rural fire authorities ==
The Forest and Rural Fire Act of 1977 reaffirmed and clarified the duties of Rural Fire Authorities; the act specified four types of RFA: gazetted rural fire districts (including the Ministry of Defence fire district), the New Zealand Forestry Corporation fire district (repealed in 1996 with the sale of the corporation), territorial rural fire districts, and state rural fire districts (responsibility of the Department of Conservation). The act ascribes the following duties to authorities:

- Carrying out fire control measures
- Complying with standards set by the NRFA
- Creation, amendment, and revocation of bylaws
- Maintenance of a district fire plan

The act also permits an authority to appoint Rural Fire Officers to discharge the duties and powers of an RFA under the act, with one being appointed the Principal Rural Fire Officer in each authority. For the purposes of the act, all warranted employees of the Department of Conservation are considered RFOs.

The Forest and Rural Fires Regulations 2005 affirm the authority of RFAs to establish Voluntary Rural Fire Forces, subordinate to them. These forces are primarily responsible for operational firefighting within a fire district; each VRFF must contain at least one RFO so that they may discharge the duties of such an officer under the 1977 act.

== See also ==
- New Zealand Fire Service
- New Zealand Fire Service Commission
- Fire and Emergency New Zealand
