= Ballantynes fire =

1947 fire in Christchurch, New Zealand

Coordinates: 43°32′00″S 172°38′10″E

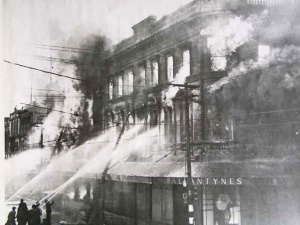
- Firefighters battling the blaze
- Date: 18 November 1947
- Location: Christchurch, New Zealand
- Cause: Unknown
- Deaths: 41 dead

On Tuesday, 18 November 1947, a fire engulfed the Ballantynes department store in central Christchurch, New Zealand, resulting in the death of 41 people. It remains the deadliest fire in New Zealand's history.

== Background ==
Ballantynes is a Christchurch department store that began as a millinery and drapery business called Dunstable House in Cashel Street in 1854. The business expanded and passed through various owners until it was purchased by John Ballantyne in 1872. The business was managed as a series of partnerships involving Ballantyne family members until the company formed as J. Ballantyne & Co. in 1920.

The Ballantynes business expanded until, by 1947, it occupied a prime corner site with frontages on Cashel, Colombo and Lichfield Streets. The business covered approximately an acre and contained seven conjoined buildings – six of which had three or more storeys – that were interconnected on multiple levels by large passageways to allow staff and customers to move freely about the store. The showrooms, fitting rooms, art gallery and sumptuous tearooms catered to the elite of Canterbury.

While its exterior was a dignified Italianate façade, there were issues in the interior. The store's interior partitions had untreated soft wood-fibre linings that had been permitted by the Christchurch City Council contrary to its own bylaws. Due to the quantity of clothes made on the premises, the upper floors of the buildings were classified as factory buildings, which helped them to pass Labour Department inspections. Two of the buildings had been constructed before fire escapes became a mandatory requirement, and the fire brigade had not directed the owners to install them despite a 1930 bylaw requiring them to do so.

Fire protection was provided by manual fire extinguishers, although staff were not formally trained in their use. There were manually operated fire doors that could be closed across the openings between buildings. Klaxons that had been installed during the Second World War and the sprinkler fire alarm in one building had not been maintained and both were eventually removed. Although the store had held evacuation drills during wartime, these had ended when hostilities ceased. There was no emergency evacuation plan and evacuation was left to the initiative of individual department heads. Many staff only knew the layout of their own workrooms and were unaware of alternative ways out of the building.

At the time of the fire, Ballantynes employed 458 people. Many of these workers worked on the upper floors in various back-office departments. The company claimed after the fire that around 250 to 300 customers were inside the building when smoke was first seen coming from a cellar, many of whom were not inside the showrooms but inside the elaborate neoclassical tearooms on an upper floor, having afternoon tea while listening to a string trio.

== Fire ==
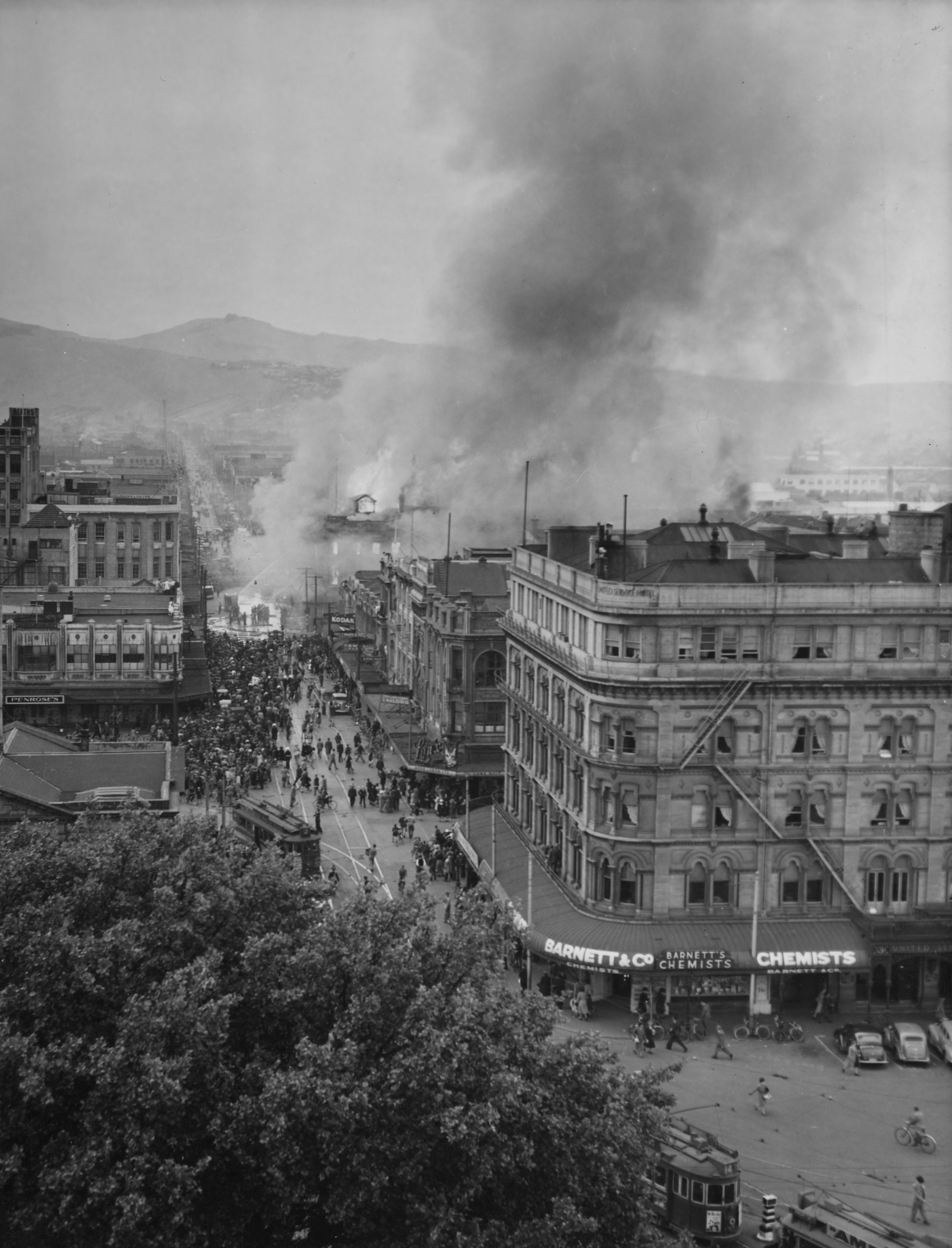
Ballantynes Fire as seen from the tower of ChristChurch Cathedral

The fire started in the basement of the furniture department, which was located at the southern end of the Colombo Street frontage of the complex. The cause of the fire was never established. Although an electrical fault or a discarded cigarette butt were both suggested as possibilities, the former could not be excluded by the commission of enquiry. The latter was considered equally unlikely as Keith Smith, the employee who was last working in the cellar, had left at about 3:30 pm for his afternoon tea break. He had gone across the street to smoke a cigarette with a friend, since Ballantynes had a strict no-smoking policy on its premises.

Around 3:30 pm on Tuesday 18 November 1947, an employee told a colleague that smoke was coming up the stairs from a stairwell, and asked them to call the fire brigade. The staff had no access to a formal fire evacuation plan. Staff discovering the fire informed their floor manager on their own initiative. Someone contacted the phone operator and stated that the fire brigade had been called. Some showrooms on the ground floor were evacuated by sales employees, but staff in some of the other showrooms on the ground floor were ordered by management to 'carry on' or 'stand by'. They left the building as they became uncomfortable with the situation. Staff in other areas of the building complex were not even made aware of the fire, as there was no fire alarm. Some staff returned to their work areas after their tea-break while others evacuated the building. Even the arriving fire brigade crews did not realise at once that there were still people on the upper floors of the building complex.

The first telephone call to the fire brigade was logged at 3:46 pm, though the phone operator simply stated that she was told to inform them there was a cellar fire at Ballantynes. When the first fire appliance arrived about two minutes later at the Lichfield Street entrance, the firefighters saw no sign of fire there. They then moved onto Colombo Street, where they saw smoke coming out of an enclosed alleyway. They were met by joint managing director Roger Ballantyne, who showed the fire crew a back access way to the cellar. They spent about 10 minutes searching for the seat of the fire but were unable to locate it. Two other appliances had made their way to Ballantynes via Cashel Street and set up as the search commenced. The senior fire officer ordered a Brigade Call, although that order was only received by the fire station at 4:00 pm. The firefighter making the call had to first push through the crowd to get to a pharmacy and then had to wait for the overloaded telephone exchange lines to clear before he could make the call.

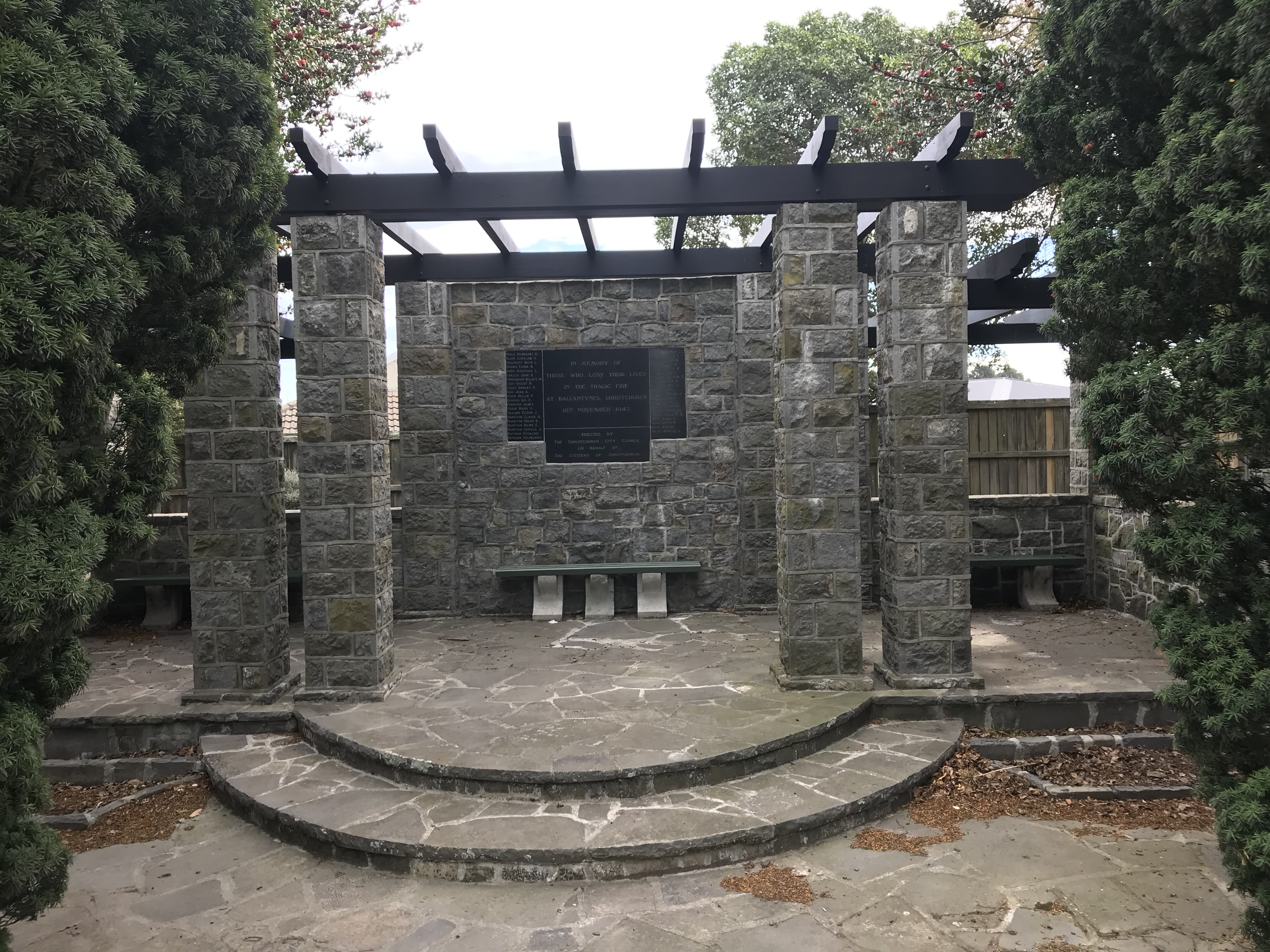
Ballantyne Memorial Rose Garden at Ruru Lawn Cemetery

Approximately half an hour after the fire was discovered, the heat and smoke went into flashover, erupting across the conjoined first floors of the Congreve's, Goodman's, and Pratt's buildings. After flashover the first floor was almost instantly consumed by a wall of flame. Over time superheated gas and fire began working into the floors above. Workers on the upper floors attempted to let firefighters know they were there by banging at windows before being killed by asphyxiation. However, the fire-brigade ladders were blocked from reaching the top floor by the store's rigid verandahs.

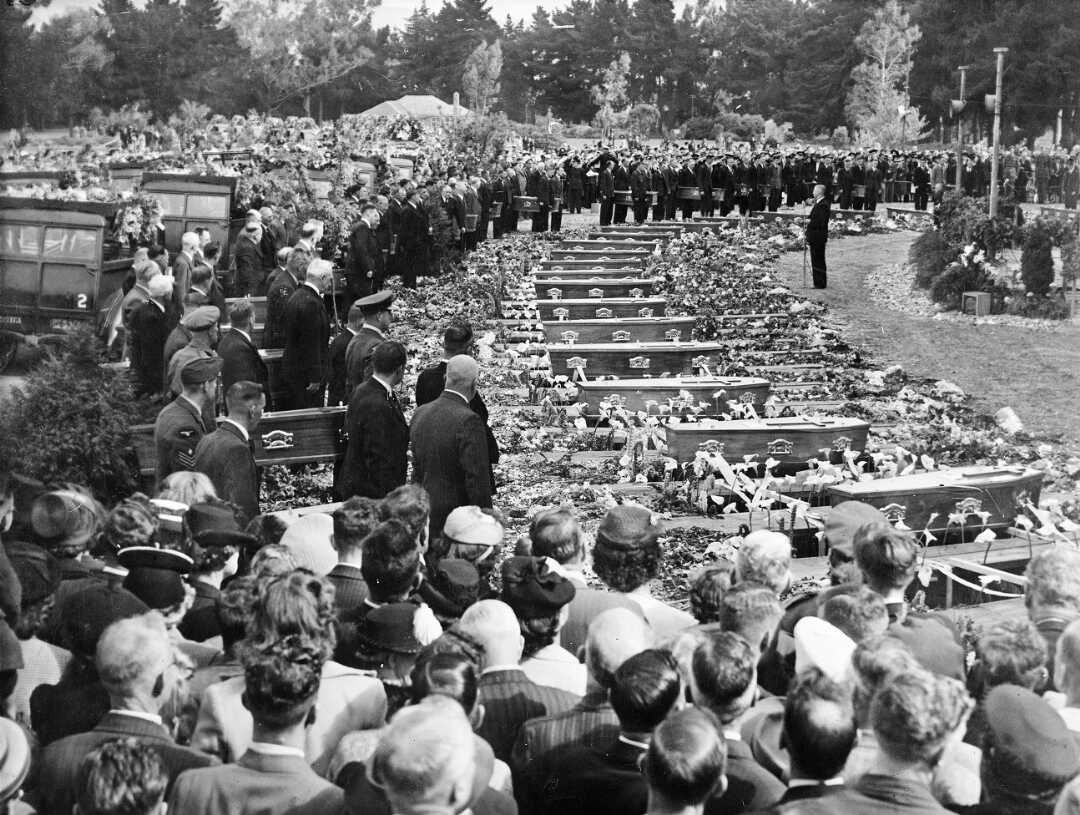
Funeral for the victims of the Ballantynes Department Store fire

Two credit department employees jumped together from a top-floor window of Pratt's Building on the corner of Colombo and Cashel Streets. They landed, injured but alive, on a slate verandah and were rescued by members of the public using a ladder and taken to hospital. Violet Cody, another credit worker, leapt from a window in Pratt's Building, landing on another slate verandah. She then fell head first to the pavement in Cashel Street. She and her unborn child later died in the hospital.

Kenneth Ballantyne was trapped. In spite of the growing signs of disaster, he had kept the staff working until about 3:55 pm. At this point he climbed out onto a window ledge as the fire engulfed the floor behind him and was the last person to be rescued by firefighters from Pratt's Building at 4:10 pm. Forty-one of his staff perished.

Office employees were not evacuated as the store's policy required that insured equipment such as typewriters be stored away in a fireproof strong room first.

Firefighters and police were able to gain entry to the ground floor about 6 pm, where they found a number of bodies near the exits and others hanging from beams. None of the victims were identifiable apart from Violet Cody. The fire was put out by 8 pm, leaving the building as a gutted shell. It took four days to dampen down hot spots, demolish unsafe walls and recover other human remains.

Planned celebrations for the wedding of Princess Elizabeth that were due to be held on 20 November 1947 were cancelled and flags were instead flown at half mast throughout New Zealand, apart from a few official exemptions on Government Buildings. The ChristChurch Cathedral bell-ringers cancelled their wedding peals that were to be recorded and later broadcast on the radio.

A civic mass funeral was held on 23 November at Ruru Lawn Cemetery in Bromley, the largest funeral in Christchurch’s history. The Ballantyne Memorial Rose Garden was built at Ruru Lawn Cemetery. The pergola that is part of the memorial collapsed in the 2011 Christchurch earthquake but was later rebuilt.

== Commission of enquiry ==
A commission later determined that the fire response had been inadequate, and the building had not met fire regulations, though it had passed its last inspection four years earlier. The commission noted that the 30 minutes between the first call to the fire brigade and the point of flashover would have been enough time to evacuate everyone in the building without injury. Recommendations were made for changes in fire prevention and firefighting for all of New Zealand. Urgent changes were recommended for building regulations and fire safety requirements to prevent similar disasters.

== Business recovery ==
After the fire, Ballantynes continued to trade from its undamaged building on Lichfield Street. The fire-damaged buildings were demolished and the main Ballantynes store was rebuilt on the corner of Colombo Street and Cashel Street.

== Legacy ==
Fire and Emergency New Zealand uses the brevity code "K41" to indicate a fatality, in reference to the 41 people who died in the fire.

The sequence of delays, errors and mistakes made by management was portrayed in the novel Gardens of Fire by historian and novelist Stevan Eldred-Grigg, who based the book on detailed research and interviews with survivors.

Deborah Challinor's 2006 novel Fire is set in Auckland in 1953, but is based on the Ballantyne’s department store fire.

A dramatisation of the fire, Ablaze, was directed by Josh Frizzell and screened by TVNZ in 2019.
