= Deborah Challinor =

New Zealand historian and novelist

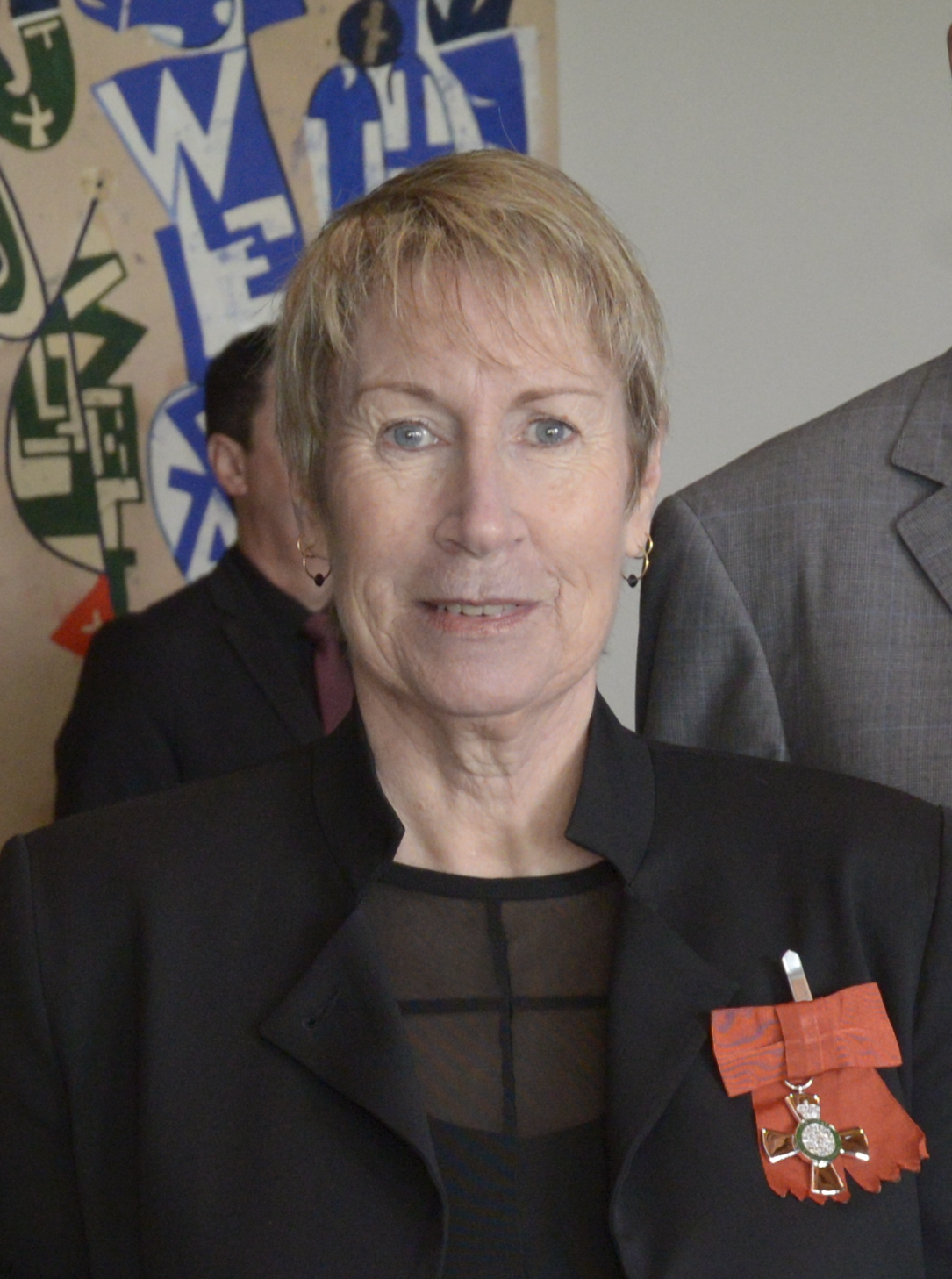
- Born: 1959; Huntly
- Awards: Member of the New Zealand Order of Merit

Academic background
- Education: University of Waikato
- Thesis: Talking the talk: New Zealanders remember the Vietnam War (1998)
- Doctoral advisor: Douglas Simes, Lawrence Harold Barber

Deborah Ann Challinor MNZM is a New Zealand writer and historian. Challinor published her twenty-first book in 2024. In 2018 she was appointed a Member of the New Zealand Order of Merit for services to literature and historical research.

== Academic career ==
Challinor grew up in Huntly and attended Huntly College. Her father was a pharmacist. After failing to get into teacher's college, Challinor attended university, where she studied English and then switched to history, graduating in 1980. She then went on to complete a master's and a PhD in history. Her doctoral thesis was titled Talking the talk: New Zealanders remember the Vietnam War at the University of Waikato in 1998. Challinor's supervisor suggested she try to publish her thesis, and this resulted in her first book, Grey Ghosts, which was published by Hodder Moa Beckett in 1998. Challinor describes herself as a 'recovering alcoholic', having started drinking at 14, and got sober in 1996 when she realised she otherwise would not finish her PhD.

After the publication of Grey Ghosts, HarperCollins invited Challinor to co-write a book, Who’ll Stop the Rain? about the after-effects on families of the use of Agent Orange in Vietnam. Two years later Challinor published her first work of historical fiction, Tamar, which was published in New Zealand and overseas and has been reprinted six times. Challinor has published more than twenty books, including several series. Her books cover historical New Zealand events such as the signing of the Treaty of Waitangi, the Māori Land Wars, and the Otago goldrush, and New Zealand's involvement in the Vietnam War. In 2024 she published the first book in a planned series centred on a female undertaker in Sydney.

Challinor was New Zealand's highest selling author in 2015, 2016 and 2017, after which she switched to an Australian publisher. Her novels have been translated to German, Russian and Czech, and have sold a million copies worldwide.

== Honours and awards ==
In 2017 the University of Waikato gave Challinor a distinguished alumni award.

In the 2018 Queen's Birthday Honours, Challinor was appointed a Member of the New Zealand Order of Merit, for services to literature and historical research.

== Selected works ==
- Children of War series: Tamar (2002), White Feathers (2003), Blue Smoke (2004)
- The Smugglers Wife series: Kitty (2006), Amber (2007), Band of Gold (2010), The Cloud Leopard's Daughter (2016)
- Convict Girls series: Behind the Sun (2012), Girl of Shadows (2013), The Silk Thief (2014), A Tattooed Heart (2015)
- The Restless Years series: Fire (2007), From the Ashes (2018), The Jacaranda House (2020), The Leonard Girls (2022)
- Tatty Crowe series: Black Silk and Sympathy (2024), Black Silk and Buried Secrets (2025), Black Velvet and Vengeance (expected to be published 2026)
- Union Belle (2005)
- Isle of Tears (2009)
