= Tamahere coolstore fire =

2008 fire in New Zealand

- Date: 5 April 2008
- Location: Tamahere, Waikato, New Zealand; 37.826°S 175.3532°E
- Type: Fire
- Cause: Refrigerant leak
- Deaths: 1
- Injuries: 7
- Property damage: NZ$25 million +

The Tamahere coolstore fire was a major fire at the Icepak Coolstores in Tamahere, near Hamilton, New Zealand, on 5 April 2008.

Around 4:00pm on Saturday 5 April 2008, the New Zealand Fire Service dispatched two fire engines and eight firefighters from Hamilton Fire Station to an alarm activation at the Icepak Coolstores facility in Tamahere, 10 km southeast of the city. Upon arrival, firefighters found no signs of fire, but upon further investigating the alarm cause, found what appeared to be a refrigerant leak. At around 4:30pm, the 400 kg of propane-based refrigerant ignited explosively, injuring all eight firefighters and destroying one fire engine. One firefighter, Senior Station Officer Derek Lovell, later died in hospital as a result of his injuries, and another firefighter received burns to 71 percent of his body. $25 million worth of cheese was in the coolstores at the time, which melted in the fire and covered neighbouring homes.

Following the fire, Icepak Coolstores and the refrigeration company contracted to maintain the coolstores pleaded guilty to health and safety breaches, and combined were ordered to pay $393,000 in fines and reparation.
