= New Zealand Fire Service =

National fire service of New Zealand (Dissolved)

- Whakaratonga Iwi (Māori)

Operational area
- Country: New Zealand

Agency overview
- Established: 1 April 1976
- Dissolved: 30 June 2017 (replaced by Fire and Emergency New Zealand)
- Annual calls: 74,879 (2015–16)
- Employees: 1,700 career firefighters 8,300 urban volunteer firefighters
- Staffing: 585 management and support 76 communications centre
- Fire chief: Paul McGill (National Commander)
- Motto: Leading integrated fire and emergency services for a safer New Zealand

Facilities and equipment
- Stations: 79 career 360 volunteer

Website
- fire.org.nz

The New Zealand Fire Service (Māori: Whakaratonga Iwi, "Service to the People"; also known as the NZFS) was New Zealand's main firefighting body from 1 April 1976 until 1 July 2017 – at which point it was dissolved and incorporated into the new Fire and Emergency New Zealand.

== Legal Authority ==
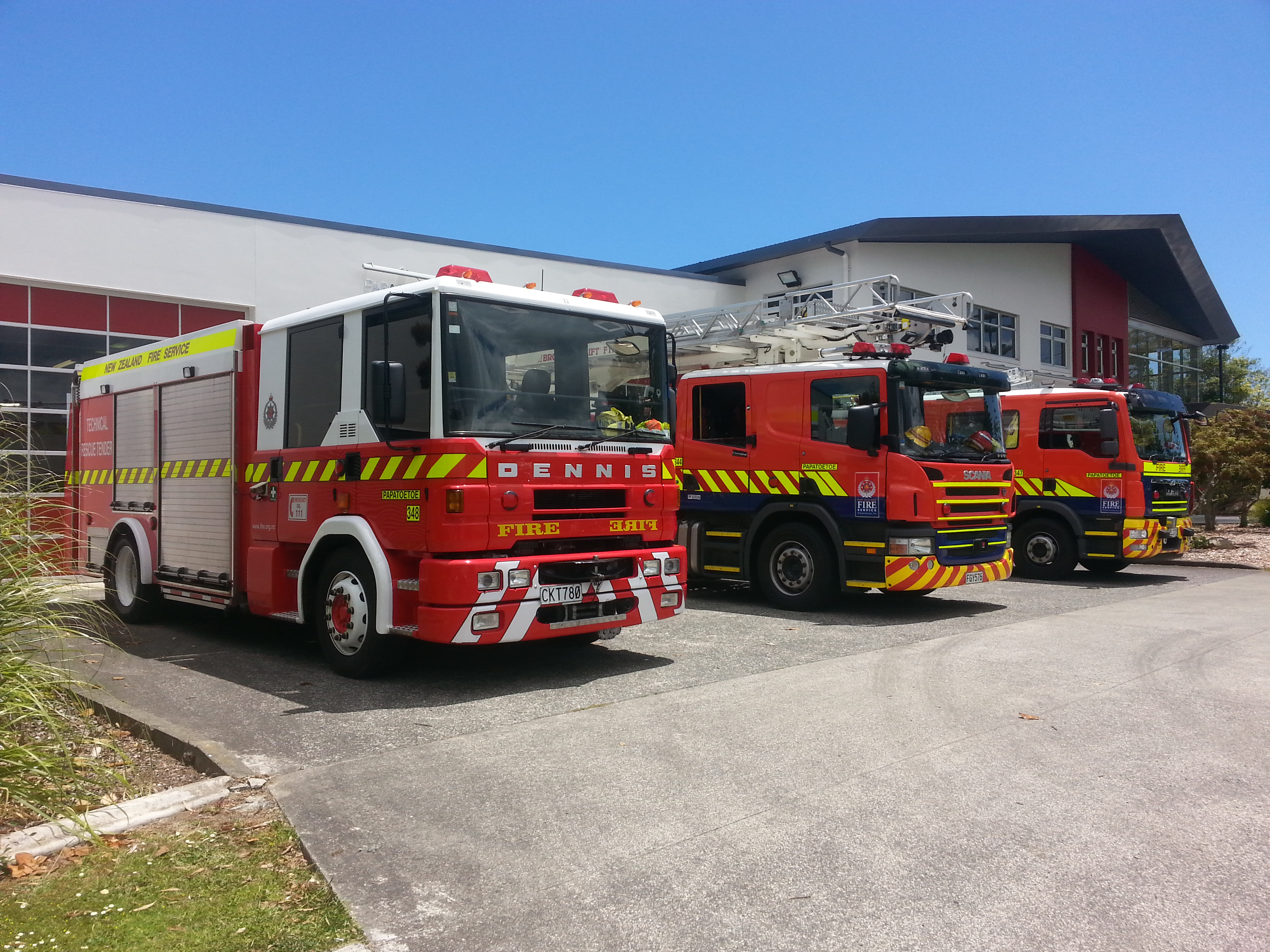
Papatoetoe fire appliances line up at outside the front of their station in December 2015.

The NZFS was somewhat unusual, internationally, in that it had jurisdiction over the entire country with no division by region or city. It was the result of the New Zealand Fire Service Act (1975), which nationalised the various District-level brigades that had developed across the country.

=== Responsibility ===
The New Zealand Fire Service was predominantly configured as an Urban Fire & Rescue Service. The Fire Service Act placed responsibility on the NZFS for firefighting in gazetted Urban Fire Districts, totalling about 3% of New Zealand's land area but covering 85% of the country's population. The remainder of the land was covered by Rural Fire Authorities (RFAs) that acted under the Forest and Rural Fires Act. Fire Service brigades responded outside their Districts to deal with structure and rescue incidents, and usually undertook the initial suppression attack on wildland fires.

Note: The New Zealand Department of Conservation was a RFA with responsibility for firefighting within recognised State areas, including National Parks, totalling about 30% of the country. The New Zealand Defence Force remains responsible for all Defence Areas as defined through the Defence Act. With these two agencies included, the NZFS and territorial local authority RFAs formed the bulk of the firefighting capability in New Zealand. There continues some contribution from Industry Fire Brigades (those run by commercial entities, for example forestry companies or Airport Authorities).

== Organisation ==
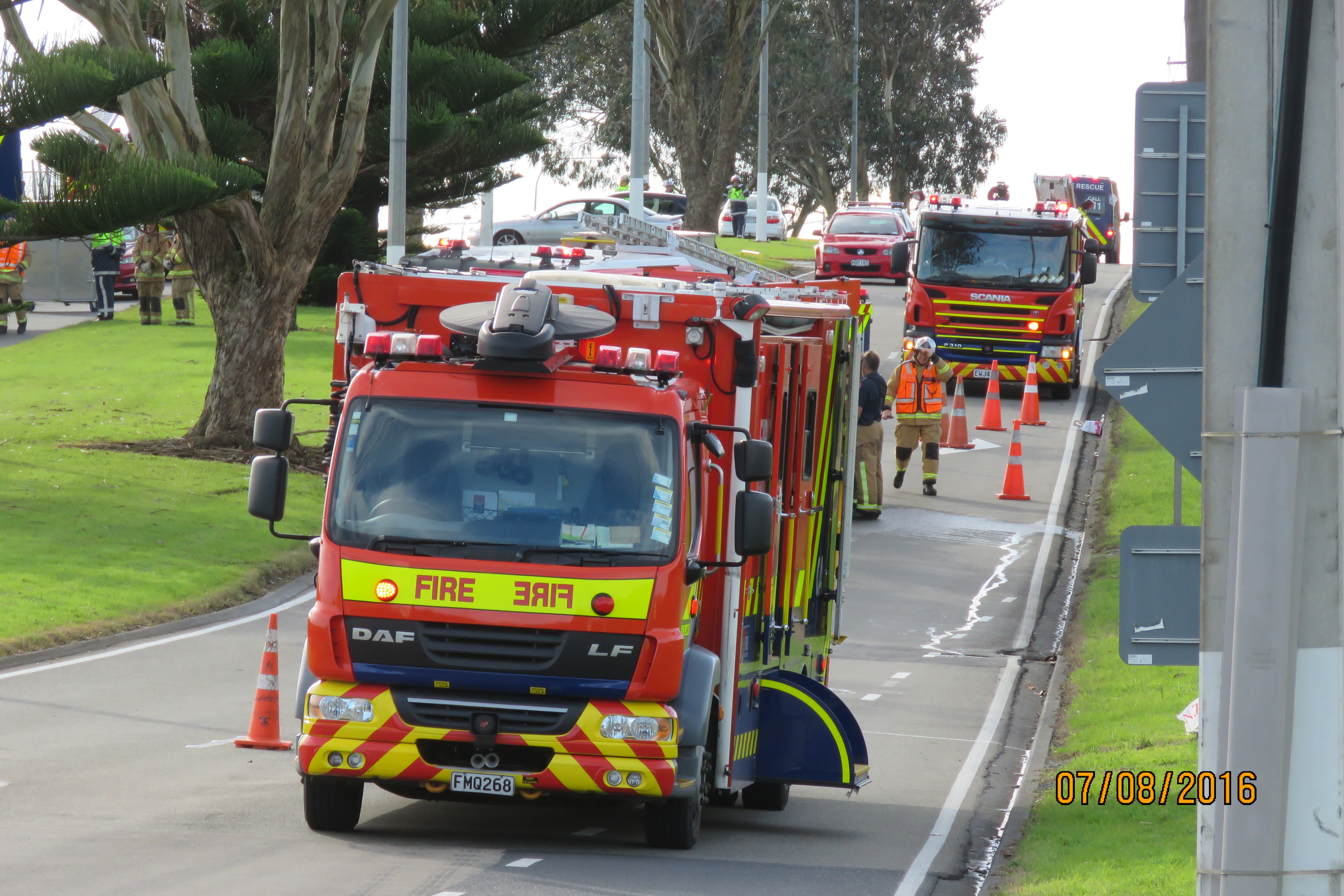
Auckland 2018 Hazmat Appliance attends a tanker rollover with an unknown substance leaking.

=== Central Government ===
The entire organisation reported to the Minister of Internal Affairs, by way of the New Zealand Fire Service Commission. The commission was composed of five members, and the Minister was required by law to appoint at least one person who was either a fire engineer or had experience as a senior operational fire fighter. The New Zealand Fire Service Commission was also the National Rural Fire Authority.

=== Chief Executive / National Commander ===
Beneath the commission were the positions of Chief Executive and National Commander. At the time of dissolution both positions were filled by Paul McGill. Where the Chief Executive did not have operational fire fighting experience, a separate National Commander was appointed to be the most senior operational fire fighter in the country. The National Commander may have taken control at a particularly serious incident, though this happened very rarely.

The Chief Executive had a number of direct reports, though these were concerned with matters such as human resources and finance rather than operational matters.

=== Chain of Command ===
The country was broken into five fire regions: Region 1 (Northland/Auckland), Region 2 (Waikato/Bay of Plenty/Gisborne), Region 3 (Lower North Island), Region 4 (South Island north of the Waitaki River), and Region 5 (South Island south of the Waitaki River). Each region was in the charge of a Fire Region Commander. All FRCs report directly to the National Commander, and were promoted from the ranks of operational staff. A FRC could take control of a major incident, and was ultimately responsible for any incident at which they are present even if they were not the Officer-in-Charge.

Reporting to the Fire Region Commander were the Area Commanders and Assistant Area Commanders who manage the 24 areas contained within the regions. The areas were:

- Region 1: Muri-Whenua, Whangarei-Kaipara, Waitemata, Auckland City, Counties-Manukau
- Region 2: Waikato, East Waikato, Bay of Plenty Coast, Central Lakes, Tairawhiti
- Region 3: Hawke's Bay, Taranaki, Wanganui, Manawatu, Hutt-Wairarapa, Wellington
- Region 4: Tasman-Marlborough, West Coast, Canterbury, Christchurch City, South Canterbury
- Region 5: Central-North Otago, East Otago, Southland

Assistant Area Commanders were primarily responsible for managing the career districts, while the Area Commanders had overall responsibility for the area as well as for the volunteer Chief Fire Officers of each volunteer fire districts within their areas. These were the officers who are ultimately entrusted – via the Fire Service Act – with the powers that are exercised at the scene of an incident to 'deal with' the emergency. These powers were far-reaching – they provide authority to commandeer, demolish or destroy whatever is required in the course of their duties, given no more suitable options.

Each Chief Fire Officer (CFO) had a Deputy Chief Fire Officer (DCFO) and a number of Senior Station Officers (SSOs) and Station Officers (SOs) reporting to them. The minimum number of firefighters required to man most appliances was four – an officer-in-charge, a driver/pump operator, and two firefighters – although many appliances were equipped to carry an extra one or two firefighters, operational support staff, or observers.

- Station Officer (SO) – In charge of the crew and the officer with the delegated authority of the CFO at any response.
- Senior Firefighter (SFF) – an SFF is an experienced Firefighter who is usually in a position to provide leadership in the absence of a Station Officer. Suitably qualified SFFs may have stood in for an SO on a temporary basis.
- Qualified Firefighter (QFF)
- Firefighter (FF) – the baseline rank within the Fire Service.

An SSO may have run in place of an SO as required or at their own discretion. In career districts the SSOs were strategically located to provide a more experienced command officer who is usually placed such that they are responded to most incidents of significance.

== Staffing ==
=== Career staff ===
The New Zealand Fire Service employed 1,713 professional career firefighters, 444 support staff and 80 communication centre staff.

Each career fire station had a number of watches (shifts). Full-time career stations have four watches, red, brown, blue and green, rotating on a "four-on four-off" schedule: two 10-hour day shifts, followed by two 14-hour night shifts, followed by four days off. Combination career and volunteer stations may have had a yellow watch, in which career staff work four 10-hour day shifts per calendar week, having one weekday, Saturday and Sunday off. Non-operational staff were "black watch", and work a regular 40-hour week.

Career Firefighters responded to 70–80% of the incidents the NZFS attended and protected around 80% of the population.

Career firefighters numbers were relatively stable with low turnover. The Fire Service usually recruited twice-yearly, and received up to 700 applications for just 48 positions on each intake, making competition high and job prospects poor compared to other industries. Initial training for career firefighters was done on an intensive 12-week residential course at the national training centre in Rotorua that covered not only traditional firefighting subjects but others required of a modern professional Fire and Rescue Service. Topics such as; urban search and rescue (USAR), motor vehicle extrication and hazardous materials.

Career firefighters provided the NZFS personnel that staff the nations specialised USAR Response teams. Additional specialised training was provided for these personnel, however all paid career firefighters were trained to a baseline USAR 'Responder' level.

=== Volunteers ===
Career firefighters made up only 20 percent of the New Zealand Fire Service's firefighting manpower; the remaining 80 percent of firefighters were volunteers, who received no payment for their time or labour. The 8,300 volunteer firefighters belonged to the 360 volunteer fire brigades, mainly serving small towns, communities and outer suburbs which career stations did not cover, and responded to 20–30% of all incidents the New Zealand Fire Service attended.

Volunteer firefighters had diverse backgrounds; around 14 percent were women, compared to just 2.8 percent in the career ranks. Volunteers were on-call; when an emergency call came through, firefighters were alerted through pagers and in many small regional towns, a siren atop the fire station.

The minimum age to become a volunteer firefighter in the New Zealand Fire Service was 16, although those under 18 required parental consent. Initial training was done within the local volunteer fire brigade at their weekly training nights and culminated in a seven-day residential recruit course, normally held at the National Training Centre (NTC) in Rotorua or the Woolston Training Centre in Christchurch. Training included hose drills, ladder drills, portable pumps, and breathing apparatus use (BA), which was carried out in BATB (Breathing Apparatus Training Building) and RFTB (Realistic Fire Training Building) simulators. The BATB is a gas-fired training facility and the RFTB is a live fire scenario.

==== Fire Police and Operational Support ====
The NZFS also engaged volunteers in non-firefighting roles, to provide support in a non-firefighting capacity at emergency incidents. These were variously engaged as Fire Police (FP) (sworn as Constables under Section 33 of the Fire Service Act) or as Operational Support (OS) (carrying out a similar role to Fire Police, but instead acting under the delegated authority of a Chief Fire Officer under Section 28 of the Act). Volunteers engaged as Fire Police or Operational Support were classed as operational personnel but were not trained or medically cleared to wear breathing apparatus; they were ranked similarly to operational firefighters and issued with the same uniform, but were identified on the incident ground by their distinctive blue helmet colour, and PPE optimised for visibility and poor-weather operations.

FP/OS personnel were either attached to an operational fire brigade, or established into standalone units in their own right. The largest established Volunteer Fire Brigade in New Zealand, Auckland Operational Support Unit (also known as the Auckland Volunteer Fire Brigade, and previously as the Auckland Fire Police Unit), had a membership of 60 and in the 2015 calendar year, members responded to more than 700 incidents.

Knowing that upcoming legislative changes would repeal Section 33 of the Fire Service Act, NZFS ceased swearing new Fire Police Constables around 2011–2012 and instead converted its remaining Fire Police to Operational Support.

Fire Police and Operational Support Units were exclusively staffed by volunteers and would be deployed at emergencies to provide non-firefighting functions, usually at larger-scale incidents. Typical duties included traffic and crowd control, scene cordons and lighting, first aid, salvage, communications and logistics, and even catering.

=== Insignia ===
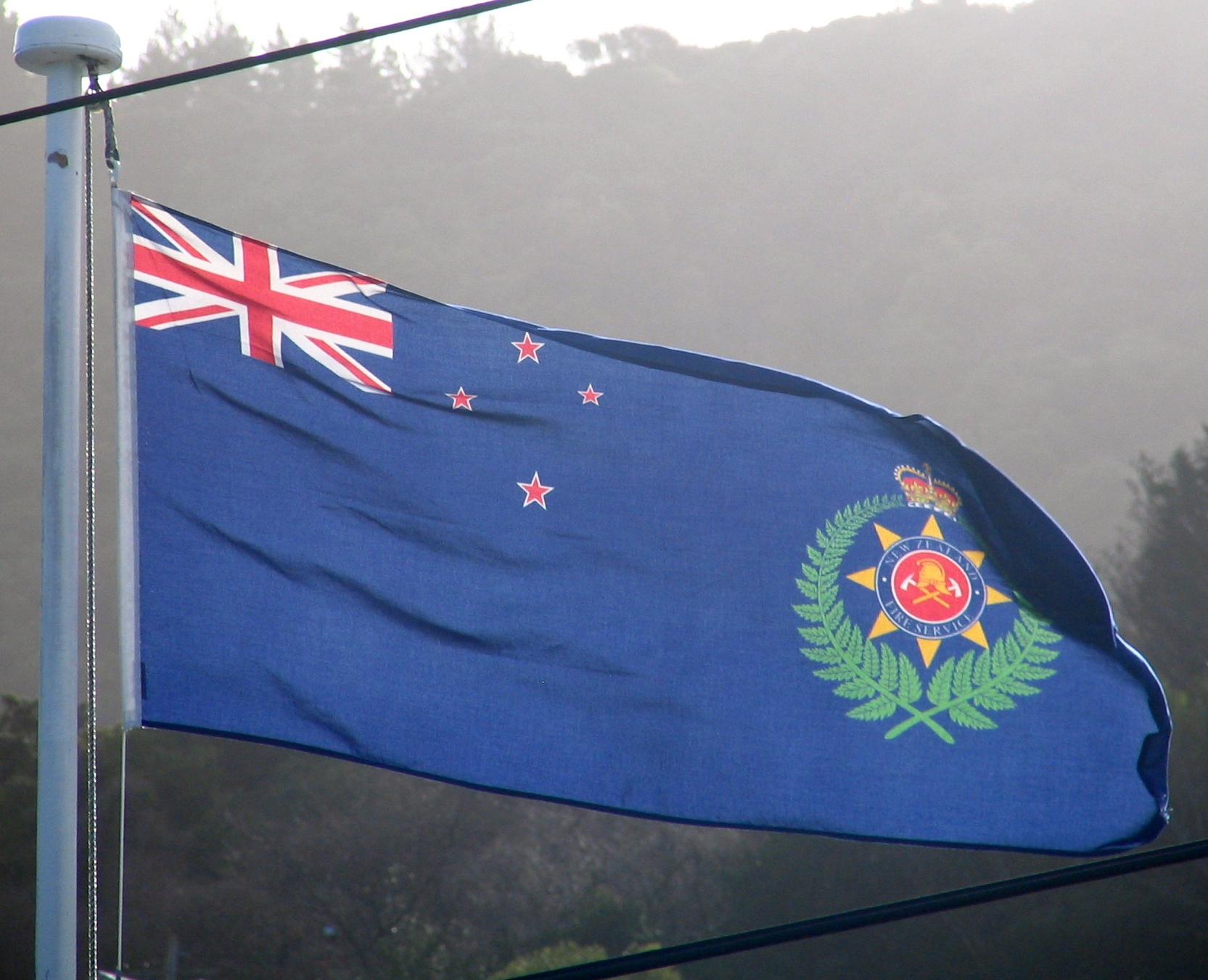
New Zealand Fire Service flag

A new colour scheme for helmets was introduced in August 2013, and rolled out in late 2013. Previously, yellow helmets were issued to Firefighters and Station Officers, white helmets to Chief Fire Officers, Area Commanders and Assistant National Commanders, with markings being the only discerning features. The changes saw Station Officer helmets change to red (trainee firefighter helmets, which were red, changed to green), and Area Commander and Assistant National Commander helmets change to silver. The change was to make it easier to identify the command structure at a large-scale, multi-agency incident.

The epaulette markings used by the New Zealand Fire Service were similar to those used by the New Zealand Police and the New Zealand Army, except for the use of impellers instead of pips.

Title	Epaulette	Cap	Gorgets	Helmet	Approximate equivalent	
Title	Epaulette	Cap	Gorgets	Helmet	LFB	FDNY
National Commander		Two rows of laurel leaves	Black oak leaves on a red background (also worn on the shirt in working dress)	Black helmet with a label reading National Commander	Commissioner	Chief of Department
Deputy National Commander		Two rows of laurel leaves	Black oak leaves on a red background (also worn on the shirt in working dress	Black helmet with a label reading Deputy National Commander		
Assistant National Commander		Two rows of laurel leaves	Black oak leaves on a red background (also worn on the shirt in working dress)	Silver helmet, two blue bands and a label reading Assistant National Commander	Assistant Commissioner	Assistant Chief
District Manager/ Commander		Two rows of laurel leaves	Black oak leaves on a red background	Silver helmet with one blue band and a label reading Commander/District Manager	Group Commander	Division Chief
Group Manager/ Assistant Commander		One row of laurel leaves	Red oak leaves on a black background	Plain Silver helmet with a label reading Assistant Commander/Group Manager	Station Commander	Battalion Chief
Chief Fire Officer (Volunteer)		Two rows of laurel leaves	Red oak leaves on a black background	White helmet, two blue bands and a label reading Chief Fire Officer	Station Commander	Battalion Chief
Deputy Chief Fire Officer (Volunteer)		One row of laurel leaves	Red oak leaves on a black background	White helmet with one blue band and a label reading Deputy Chief Fire Officer	—N/a	—N/a
Senior Station Officer		Plain	None	Red helmet with two blue bands or Blue helmet with two yellow bands (Operational Support)	Station Officer	Captain
Station Officer		Plain	None	Red helmet with one blue band or Blue helmet with one yellow band (Operational Support)	Sub-Officer	Lieutenant
Senior Firefighter		Plain	None	Yellow helmet with two red bands or Blue helmet with two red bands (Operational Support)	Leading Firefighter	Firefighter
Qualified Firefighter		Plain	None	Yellow helmet with one red stripe or Blue helmet with one red stripe (Operational Support)	Firefighter	Firefighter
Firefighter		Plain	None	Plain Yellow helmet or Plain Blue helmet (Operational Support)	Firefighter	Firefighter
Recruit Firefighter	Blank with 'RECRUIT'	Plain	None	Fluorescent green helmet with black crest	—N/a	Probationary Firefighter

== Role ==
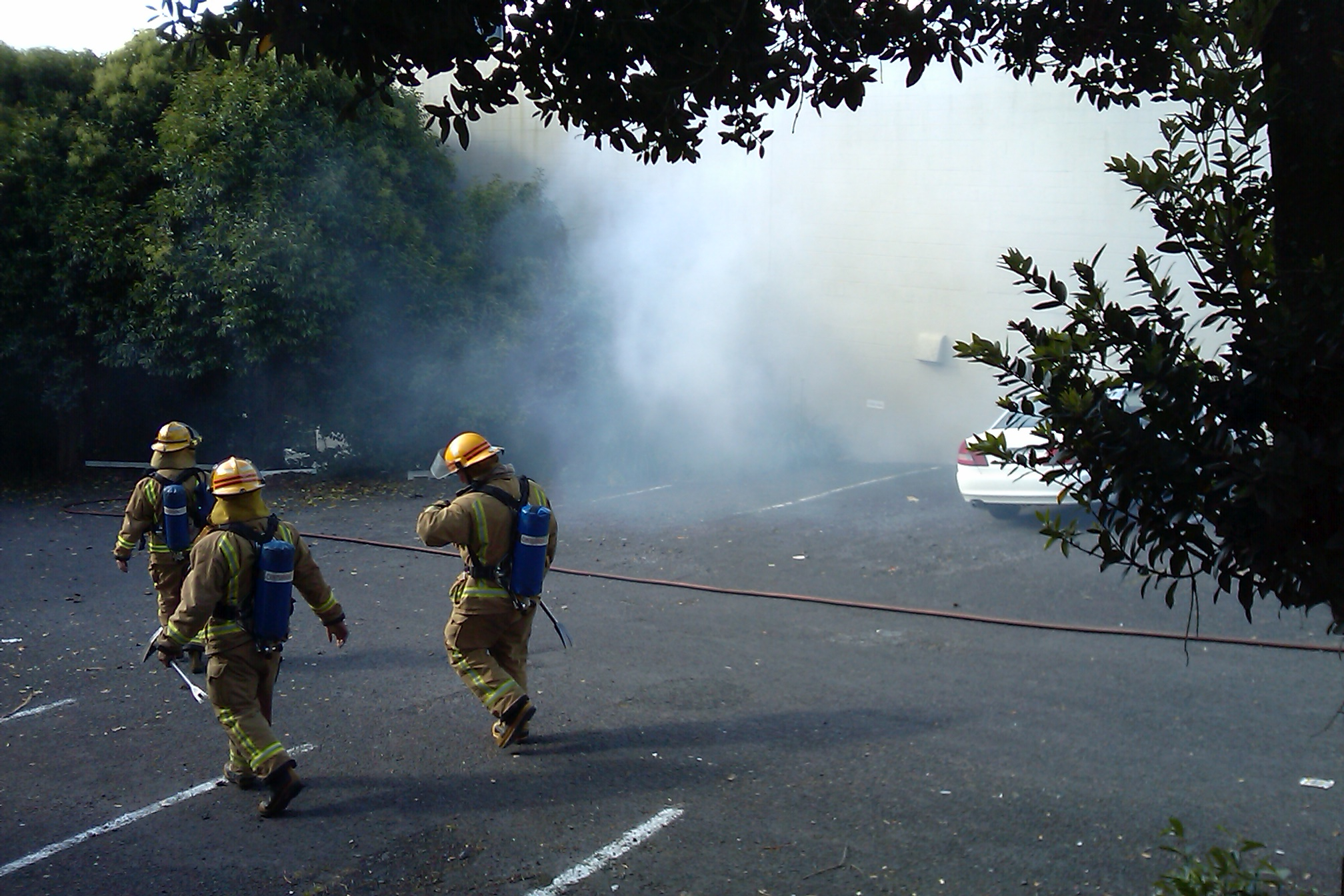
Responding to a fire under an office building in Auckland in 2009.

The New Zealand Fire Service was first and foremost a firefighting service, as made obvious by the name. However, it was also increasingly called upon for other emergencies where firefighting skills and tools are helpful, including hazardous material incidents, motor vehicle accidents, natural disasters, and medical emergencies. This change in focus was reflected in the name-change effected during the transition to Fire and Emergency New Zealand.

In the year to 30 June 2013, the Fire Service attended 70,900 callouts. Of those, 7.7 percent were for structural fires, 23.3 percent were for non-structural fires, 32.8 percent for non-fire emergencies, and 36.2 percent were false alarms. In the same period, 38 people died in 34 fatal fires.

Examples of non-fire emergencies the Fire Service attended include:

- Road Crash Rescue – Extrication of entrapped persons in the aftermath of a motor vehicle accident
- High Angle Rescue – Rescue from the side of buildings; dangerous terrain (cliff faces, etc.)
- Hazardous Materials (HAZMAT) – The containment of a hazardous substance and decontamination of an environment or persons affected by a hazardous substance
- Natural Disasters – Addressing the problems caused by heavy rain and high winds (lifted roofing, power lines and trees down onto properties or across roadways, flooding)
- Urban Search and Rescue (USAR) – The New Zealand Fire Service was the lead agency for New Zealand USAR operations (Civil defence & emergency management Act 2002) They also managed three USAR Task Force level teams, providing communications and resources. Being the lead agency, the New Zealand Fire Service also coordinated the 17 NZ Response Teams which also provide light USAR support. Paid career NZFS firefighters had a baseline level of training in USAR techniques and made up the vast majority of the actual USAR team members.
- Medical Co-Response – Co-responding with ambulance services to "Code Purple" emergencies (e.g. cardiac and respiratory arrest)
- Medical First Response – Responding to medical emergencies in smaller communities where there is no local ambulance service, as well as in the main centres when an ambulance is unavailable or will be significantly delayed in attending an incident.

== Appliances and vehicles ==
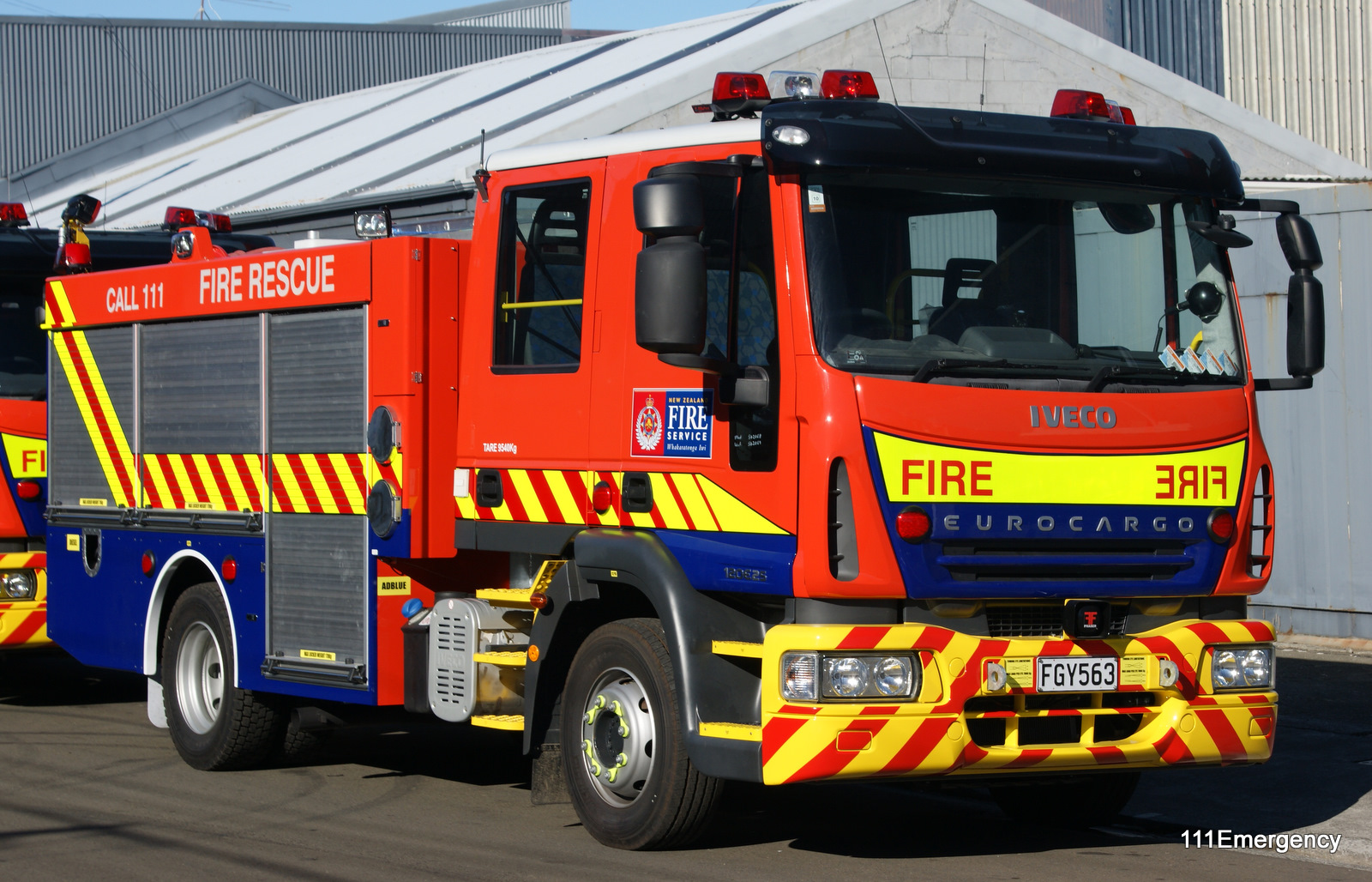
Type 1 Pump Appliance.

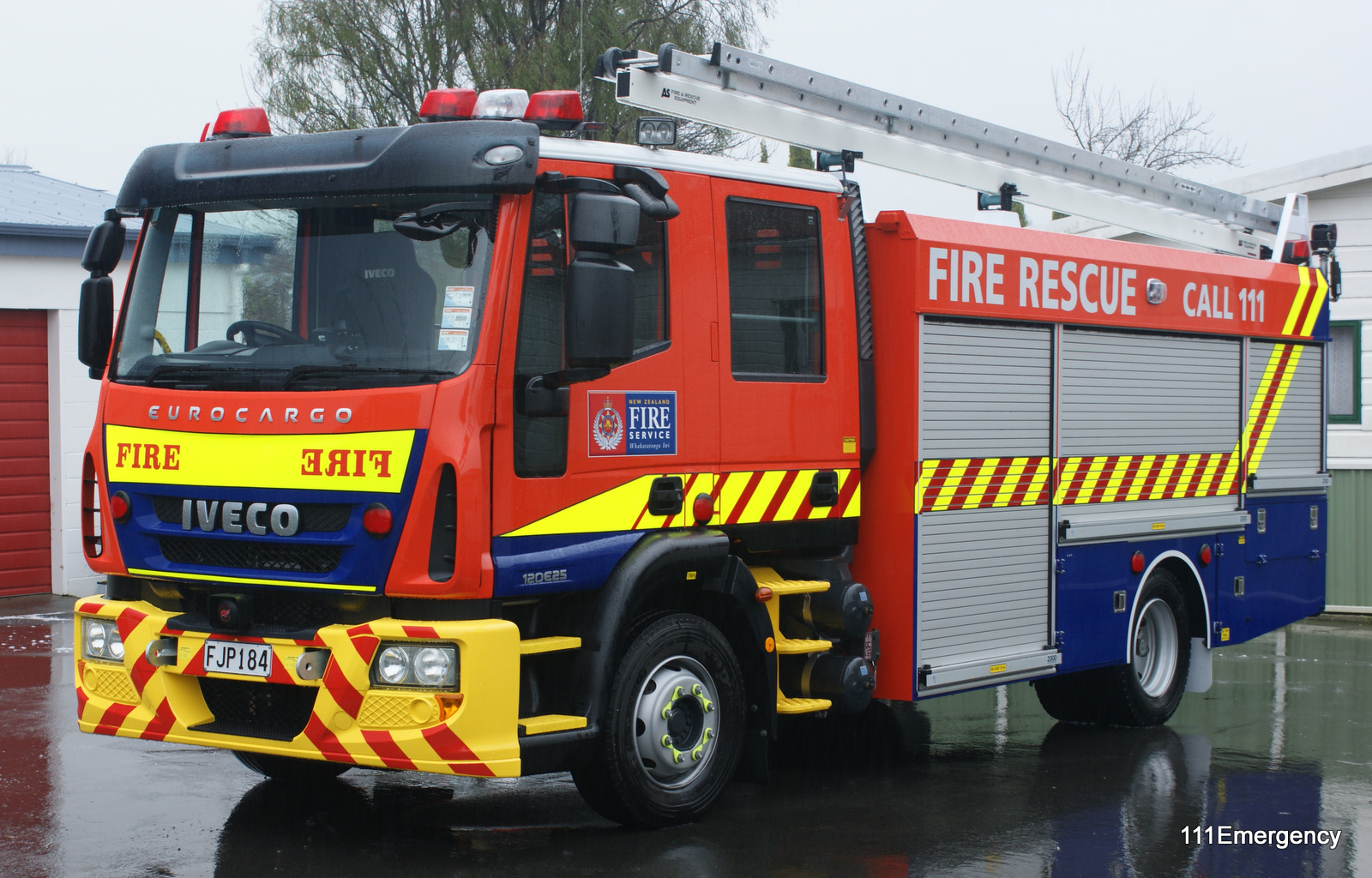
Type 2 Pump Rescue Appliance.

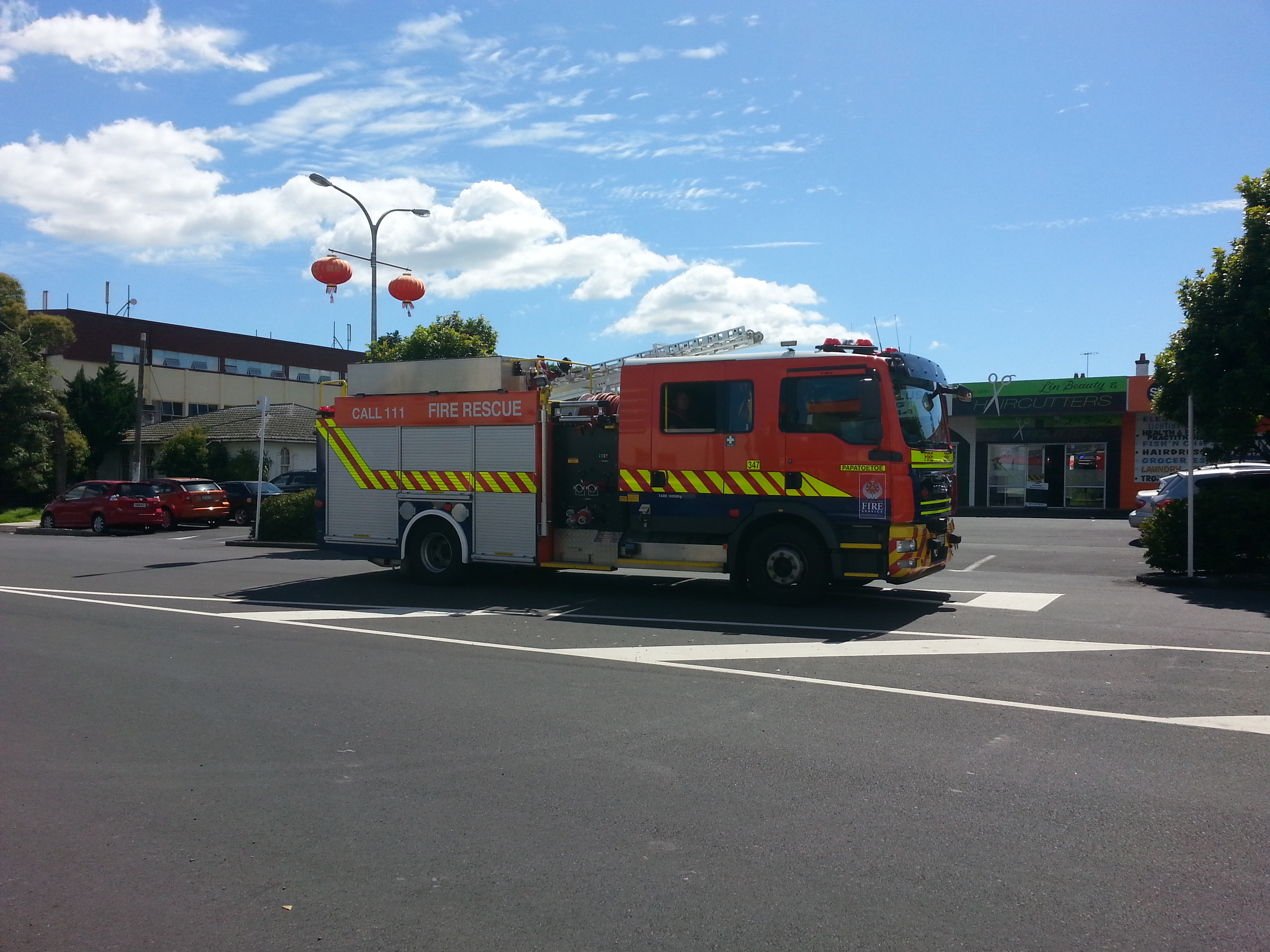
Type 3 Pump Appliance.

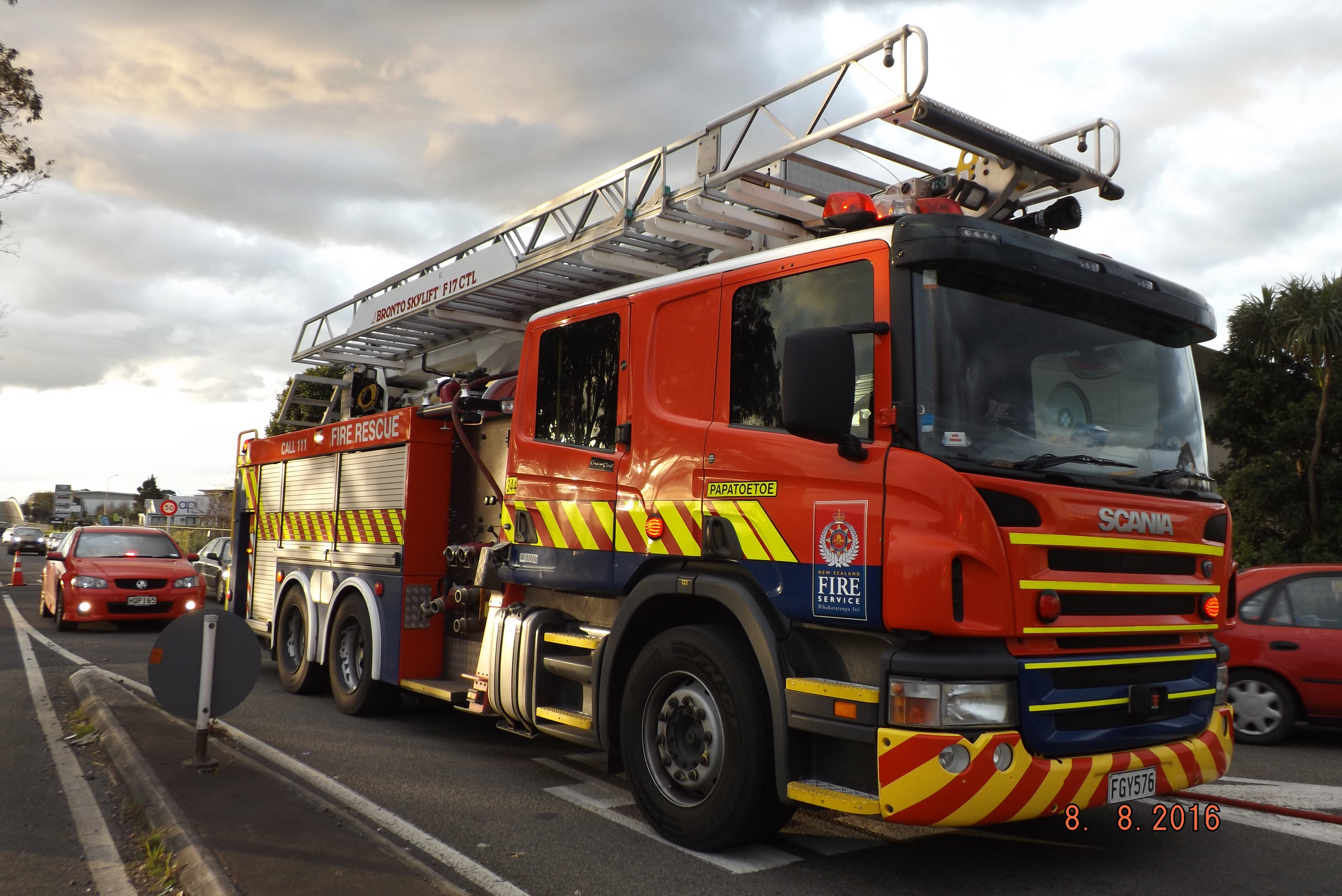
Type 4 Bronto Aerial Appliance.

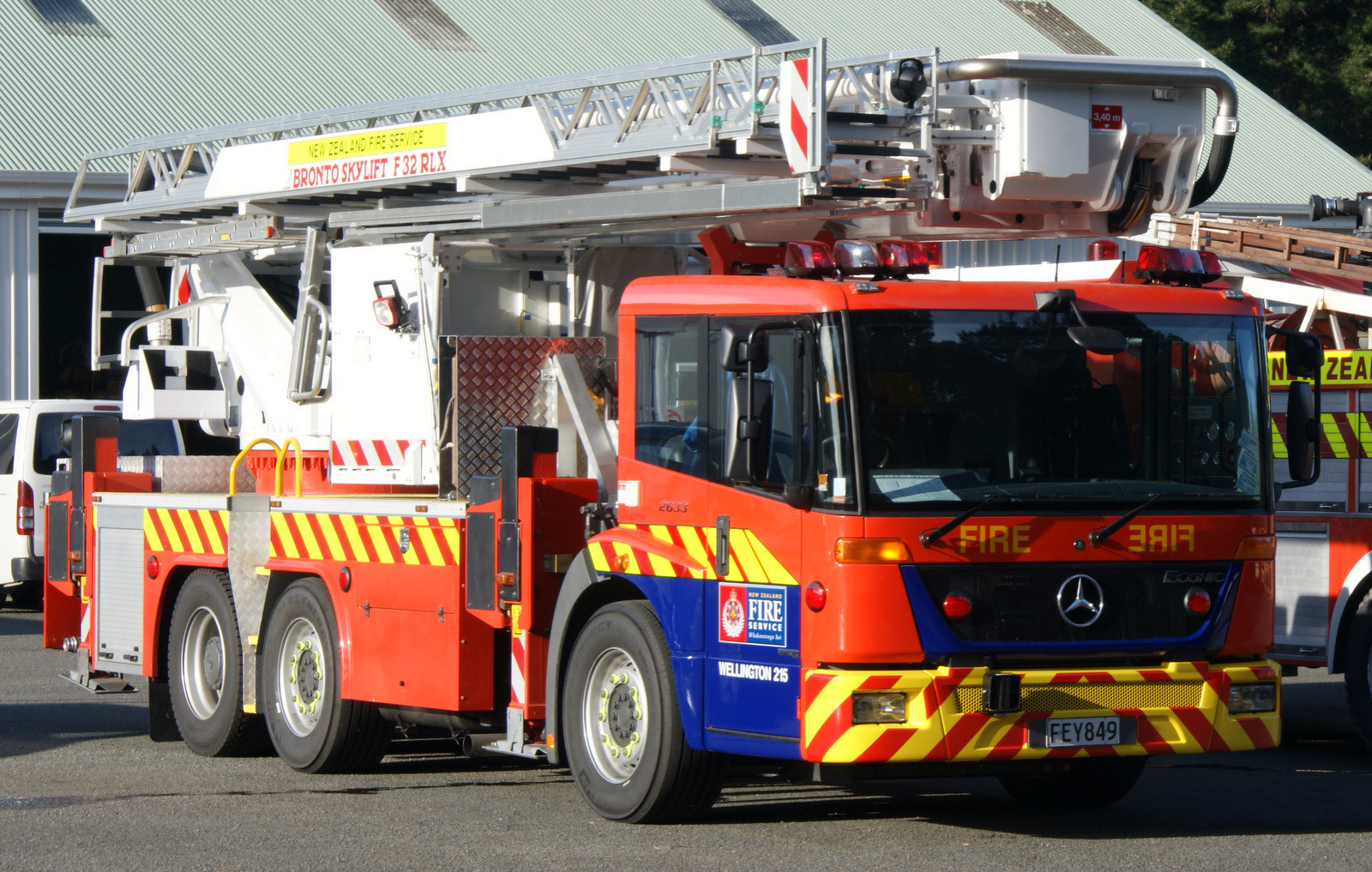
Type 5 hydraulic elevating platform

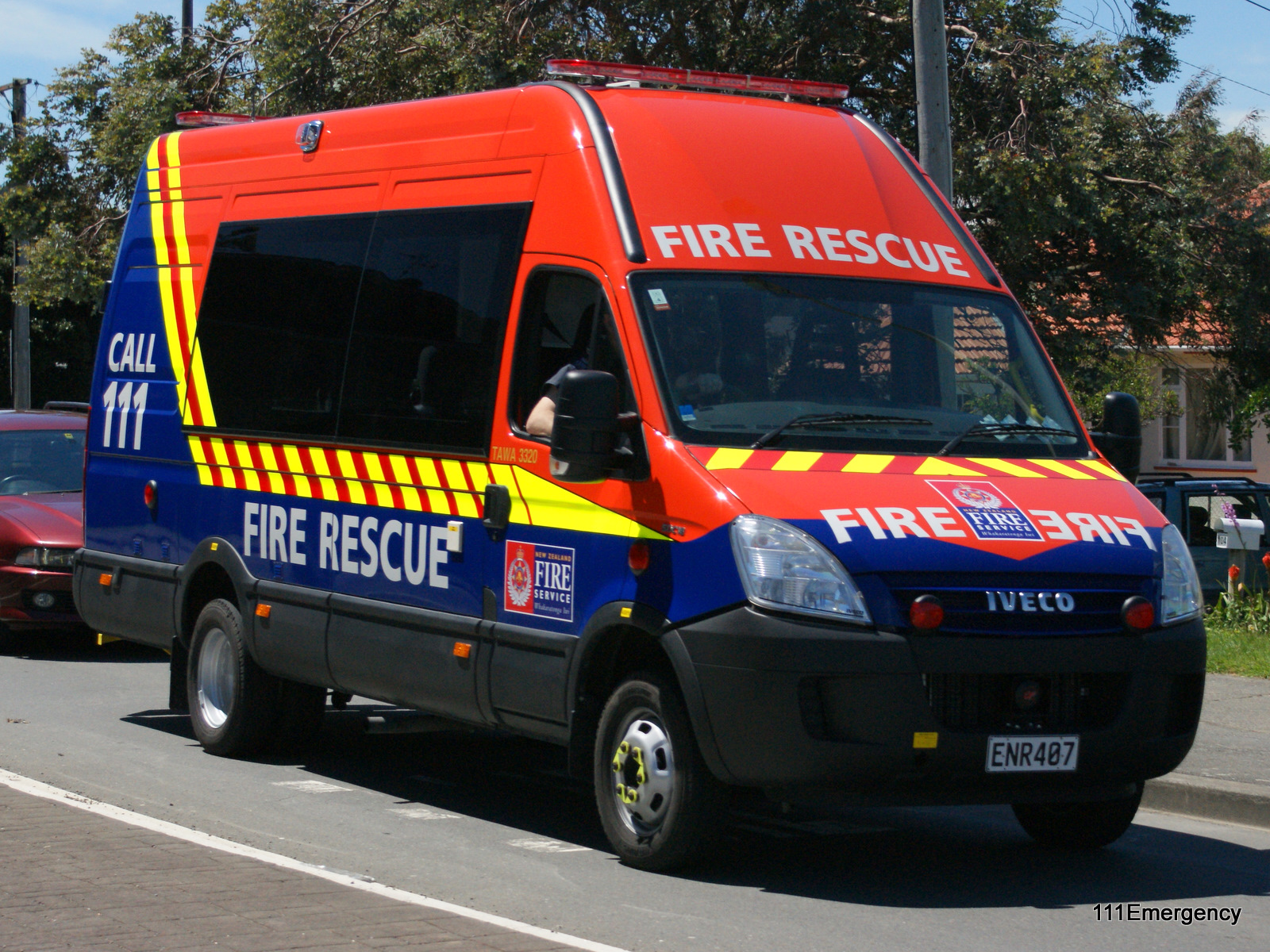
Light response vehicle (LRV)

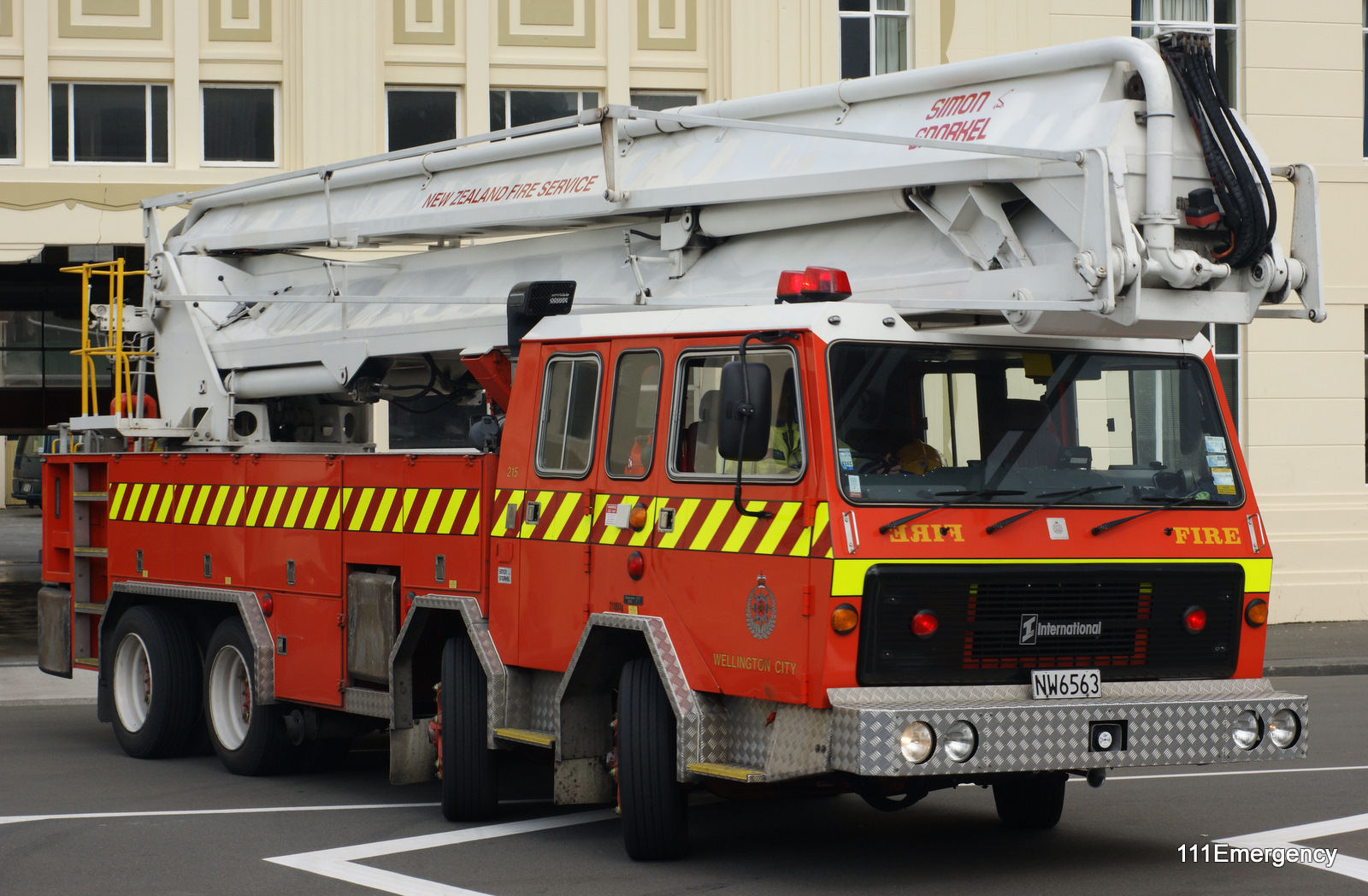
Type 5 hydraulic elevating platform (retired)

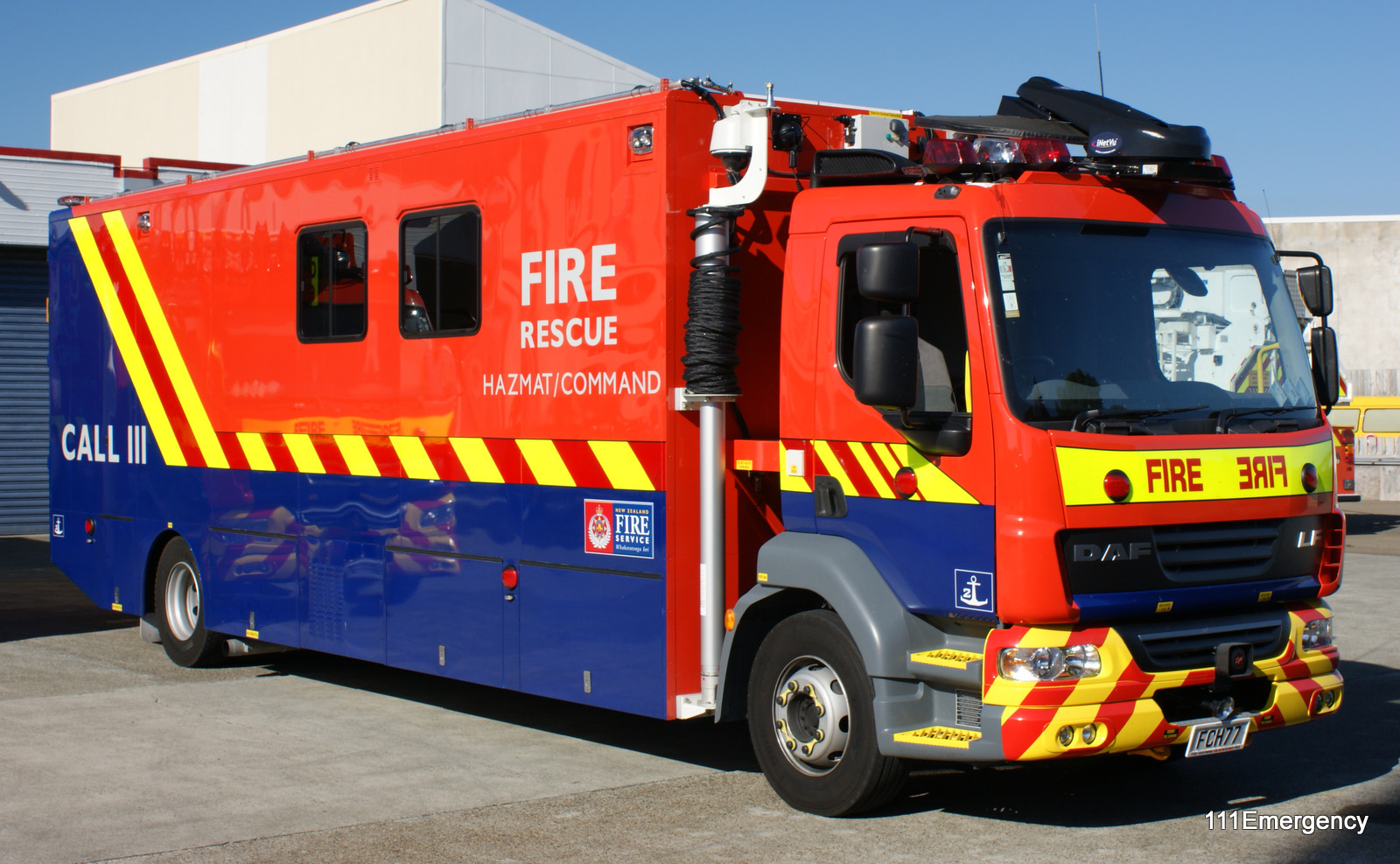
Combined command and hazardous materials tender

The New Zealand Fire Service operated around 850 fire appliances, including conventional pumping appliances and specialist appliances, and 330 support vehicles. Fire appliances were given a three- or four-digit number for identification; the first two digits specify the appliance's resident station (numbers may be repeated between areas), while the last one or two digits specify its function. An example being "Newlands 291" – 29 indicated the appliance is resident at Newlands fire station in Wellington, and 1 indicates its function is a pump. These conventions carried through to the successor organisation, Fire and Emergency New Zealand.

=== Pumping appliances ===
The basic appliance in service with NZFS was the Pump Tender, which is primarily equipped for fires. Typical equipment included a pump (normally driven off the appliance engine via a power take-off); a high pressure hose reel for small fires and initial attack; a supply of high-pressure and low-pressure hoses for larger fires; fire-fighting foam; a standpipe and bar for accessing fire hydrants, and suction hoses for accessing non-reticulated water supplies; forcible entry tools such as Halligan bars, axes and sledgehammers; aluminium and wooden ladders; and a first aid kit with an automated external defibrillator.

The two major variations on the Pump Tender were the Pump Aerial Tender and the Pump Rescue Tender. The Pump Aerial Tender had an additional aerial ladder and monitor for high-rise and aerial attacks. The Pump Rescue Tender, in addition to firefighting equipment, carried extra equipment primarily for motor vehicle accidents and vehicle extrication. Typical equipment included hydraulic rescue tools (aka "The Jaws of Life"), vehicle stabilisation equipment, and winches.

Most new pumping appliances for the New Zealand Fire Service up until the transition to Fire and Emergency New Zealand, were manufactured by the Fraser Engineering Group in Lower Hutt, and based on Iveco, Scania and finally MAN chassis. Other manufacturers and chassis including Hino, Dennis, Mitsubishi/Fuso, International, Dodge, Bedford and Mack had been used in the past.

There were four sizes of pumping appliances, named Type 1 through Type 5:

- The Type 1 "Light" appliance was used in both urban and rural areas. It had a rear-mounted 1900 L/min pump with one low-pressure hose reel, a 2000 L onboard water tank, and around 5.2 m^{2} of locker space. The latest appliances were typically built on Iveco Eurocargo chassis.
- The Type 2 "Medium" appliance was used in both urban and rural areas. It had the same features as the Type 1, but had an additional high-pressure hose reel and around 1.3 m^{2} extra locker space. The latest appliances were typically built on Iveco Eurocargo chassis.
- The Type 3 "Heavy" appliance was used in urban areas. It had a mid-mounted 3800 L/min pump with two high-pressure hose reels, and a 1400 L onboard water tank. As of 2015, new appliances were typically built on MAN TGM chassis; prior to this they were typically built on Scania P-series chassis.
- The Type 4 "Heavy Aerial" or "Bronto" appliance was used in urban areas. It had the same features as the Type 3, but was also fitted with a 17-metre aerial ladder and monitor. The latest appliances were typically built on Scania P-series chassis.
- The Type 5 & 6 "Heavy Aerial" or "Bronto" appliance was used in urban/city areas. It had the same features as the Type 4, but was fitted with a 32-metre aerial ladder and monitor, instead of a 17-metre. Some of the larger aerial appliances did not have their own integrated pumps, and required support from a Type 3 'base pump' to provide water for firefighting.

Under NZFS (and subsequently within FENZ), Pump Tender identification numbers ends in 1, 2 or 3 (e.g. Onehunga 221, Manurewa 301, Hastings 561); Pump Aerial Tender identification numbers end in 4, 5 or 6 (e.g. Ellerslie 274, Auckland 205, Parnell 256); and Pump Rescue Tender (PRT) identification numbers end in 7 (e.g. Auckland 207, Papatoetoe 347, Christchurch 217)

=== Specialist appliances ===
Career staff appliances may also carry more specialised items used for industrial rescue, light USAR and high-angle line rescue. In some areas, these are carried on separate Rescue or Emergency Tenders which do not have pumping capabilities.

Additional specialist appliances are usually strategically located in each fire district. Typical appliances, their functions and identification numbers are as follows:

- Hydraulic elevating platforms with aerial monitor ("Snorkel") – non-pumping, typically 32 metres (105 ft) long (callsign suffix: 5)
- Turntable ladders – non-pumping, typically 32 metres (105 ft) long. (6)
- Technical (Heavy) Rescue Tender – Auckland Fire District only (8)
- Water tankers, to assist in water supply at properties or in areas without a reticulated supply (11)
- Hoselayers (12)
- Breathing Apparatus Tenders, to supply extra breathing apparatus cylinders and mobile cylinder refilling at major incidents (15)
- Command vehicles, to act as a mobile communications centre and incident control point at major incidents (14 or 18)
- Hazardous Materials Response (Hazmat) (16 or 18)
- Operational Support Vehicles (26, 29)
- Lighting & Power Generation Units (usual callsign suffix: 19)
- Fire Medical Vehicle (FMV) – prototype combination pump tender and medical first response vehicle.

== Communications ==
The NZFS worked closely with the NZ Police in many respects – a key one of those is that the three Communications Centres which co-ordinate the Fire Service response across NZ are colocated with their Police Equivalents in Auckland, Wellington and Christchurch. The radio network used by the Fire Service for its nationwide coverage was provided and supported by the police, although most urban areas provided for an exclusive Fire-only radio channel or channels.

In rural areas, the channel may have been shared between both services. Generally this was an acceptable arrangement, though when either the Police or the Fire Service are particularly busy in an area with shared radio services, this could cause the other service some grief. In contrast, the fact that police have ready and direct access to the Fire Communications Centre was occasionally of some value in terms of inter-agency liaison.

At the scene of an incident, VHF and UHF simplex frequencies were generally used. These were usually common between NZFS, NRFA, DoC and NZDF firefighters and discrete from the police. Access to shared liaison channels was also provided, allowing for Ambulance, Police, Fire and other resources (for example aircraft that may be called upon to assist in firefighting) to co-ordinate.

=== CIMS ===
The New Zealand Fire Service was one of the key developers of the Coordinated Incident Management System which is now in widespread use throughout the NZ Emergency Services environment. This provides for a common set of terminology and procedures which lends itself to multi-agency incidents.

== See also ==
- Australasian Fire and Emergency Service Authorities Council
