= Lawrence Nowlan =

American artist and sculptor

Lawrence Joseph Nowlan Jr. (January 11, 1965 – July 30, 2013) was an American sculptor and figurative artist known for his statues of notable individuals, including Harry Kalas and Jackie Gleason. Nowlan also designed memorials, including the firefighter sculptures at the Wildland Firefighters National Monument in Boise, Idaho, which was his first commission as a sculptor, and the war memorial in Windsor, Vermont. Additionally, Nowlan created the statuette awarded by several major ceremonies, including the ESPN ESPY Award and the My VH1 Music Awards. He was working on an 8-foot, 800 pound statue of Philadelphia boxer, Joe Frazier, at the time of his death in 2013.

== Biography ==
=== Early life and education ===
Nowlan was born in Philadelphia, Pennsylvania, to Lawrence and Jeanne Nowlan. He was the grandson of the Science fiction writer, Philip Francis Nowlan, best known as the creator of Buck Rogers. Nowlan was raised in Philadelphia's Overbrook neighborhood before the family moved to nearby Merion, Pennsylvania. He graduated from Archbishop John Carroll High School in Radnor, Pennsylvania.

He received his bachelor's degree from Millersville University in Millersville, Pennsylvania, in 1987. He took a position with a Philadelphia advertising agency as an art director and designer after graduating from Millersville. Though the ad agency paid well, Nowlan later described himself as "miserable" in a 1999 interview with the Valley News.

Nowlan first became interested in sculpture accidentally after coming across the works of Auguste Rodin in Philadelphia. He enrolled in a night class in sculpture at the Pennsylvania Academy of the Fine Arts. The class' teacher noticed Nowlan's talent and encouraged him to apply to art school.

Nowlan was accepted to the New York Academy of Art Graduate School of Figurative Art, where he earned a master's degree in 1996. His enrollment at the New York Academy of Art proved to be a turning point in his career. He earned a prestigious residency at the Saint-Gaudens National Historic Site in Cornish, New Hampshire, during his first year in graduate school. The Saint-Gaudens National Historic Site was the home and studio of the late Irish-born American sculptor, Augustus Saint-Gaudens, one of Nowlan's greatest influences.

Lawrence Nowlan was an artist-in-residence at the Saint-Gaudens National Historic Site for five summers, from 1995 to 1997 and again from 2001 to 2002. He studied both portrait sculpture and bas-relief while at Saint-Gaudens. He also met his future wife while working at Saint-Gaudens, an intern with the Student Conservation Association named Heather Wiley, whom he married in 2003.

=== Sculptures ===
Nowlan founded his own art studio on the second floor of a former Unitarian Church on Main Street in Windsor, Vermont, shortly after leaving his position at Saint-Gaudens for the first time in 1997. He created most of his best known works at his Windsor studio.

Nowlan was commissioned for his first major, public work, the Wildland Firefighters National Monument, while still working as an artist-in-residence at Saint-Gaudens. Rick Kendall, the superintendent of the Saint-Gaudens National Historic Site, has noted that the selection of Nowlan is one of only a few occasions when an employee of the National Park Service has been selected to create a national memorial. The monument commemorates firefighters who have been killed battling wildfires. Nowlan created three eight-foot tall, bronze statues of firefighters as the centerpiece of the Wildland Firefighters National Monument, which was dedicated on May 25, 2000, in Boise, Idaho. A replica of one of Lawrence Nowlan's original firefighter sculptures was installed in Prescott, Arizona, in August 2013, to commemorate the lives of nineteen firefighters killed in the Yarnell Hill Fire of June 2013.

He created two works depicting the late Nile Kinnick, a 1939 Heisman Trophy winner from the University of Iowa, who was killed during World War II. One piece is an 18-foot bas relief of Kinnick scoring a touchdown during a college football game against the University of Notre Dame. Nowlan's second piece is a statue of Kinnick standing 16-feet high, dedicated on September 1, 2006. Both works stand at the University of Iowa's Kinnick Stadium in Iowa City, Iowa.

Nowlan's other public works include a statue of Jackie Gleason's character from The Honeymooners television show, Ralph Kramden, which stands inside the Port Authority Bus Terminal in Manhattan, New York City. Nowlan's bronze statue of sports broadcaster Harry Kalas was unveiled in Citizens Bank Park in his native city of Philadelphia in 2011.

Nationally, other major projects by Nowlan include a series of bas-reliefs installed at the Culinary Institute of America in Napa Valley, California; a monument which stands at the Marine Biological Laboratory in Woods Hole, Massachusetts; and a 2012 monument to Bill Bergan, a track and field coach, which stands on the campus of Iowa State University. Nowlan was also commissioned for works within New Hampshire and Vermont, including a bronze angel fountain at the Cornish Colony Gallery in New Hampshire; the Windsor War Memorial in Windsor, Vermont (the location of his studio); a bronze statue of a girl reading a book, which was dedicated at Ray Elementary School in honor of a former teacher, Louise Derrick; and a bronze figure of a wildcat, which was installed at the Kimball Union Academy, a private boarding school in Meriden, New Hampshire, in June 2013.

In addition to his work in the United States, Nowlan was also commissioned for several works in the Republic of Ireland. He created a commemorative plaque of Augustus Saint-Gaudens, which was placed in Dublin. He also crafted two relief portraits commissioned by the town of Carrick, County Donegal.

Nowlan also created the award statuettes for the ESPN ESPY Awards and the now defunct My VH1 Music Awards.

In April 2013, Nowlan, a native Philadelphian, was selected by the city of Philadelphia to create a statue of one of the city's best known sports figures, the late professional boxer and world heavyweight champion Joe Frazier. Nowlan had previously designed a well-known bronze statue of Harry Kalas, which was installed in the Citizen Bank Park in 2011. In a May 2013 interview with the Rutland Herald, unveiled his planned design for the Frazier statue, which was intended to stand 8-feet tall and weigh 800 pounds. Nowlan designed the statue to depict Frazier with the left hook he used to knock out his opponent, Muhammad Ali, and win the 1971 Fight of the Century at Madison Square Garden. When completed, it was planned that the statue would stand at the Stateside Live! in South Philadelphia.

=== Death ===
Nowlan died unexpectedly of natural causes at his home in Cornish, New Hampshire, on July 30, 2013, at the age of 48, before his statue of Joe Frazier was completed, "stunning" the Frazier family. Nowlan's death left the final design for the statue in question, with project managers uncertain whether another sculptor would copy Nowlan's original design. Philadelphia Mayor Michael Nutter said at the time that the city would still build the statue. Richard Hayden, the project manager for the Joe Frazier statue, called Nowlan's death a major blow, commemorating the life of a real-life boxing legend, as opposed to Rocky Balboa, a character from a movie with a statue in Philadelphia. Ultimately a statue sculpted by Philadelphia sculptor Stephen Layne was erected at Stateside Live! in 2015.

Nowlan was survived by his wife Heather, their daughter Monet and son Teelin, and his six siblings, Peter, Joseph, Jeanne, Susan, Nancy and Danielle.
