= My VH1 Music Awards =

The My VH1 Music Awards were an annual music award ceremony held by American television network VH1 held in both 2000 and 2001. Categories, nominees, and winners were selected entirely by public voting at VH1.com. The ceremonies were held at the Shrine Auditorium in Los Angeles, California, broadcast live on VH1 and online. The award statuette was designed by sculptor Lawrence Nowlan.

== 2000 ==
Hosted by John Leguizamo. Performers included Christina Aguilera, Bon Jovi, The Corrs, Creed, Metallica (their final performance with bassist Jason Newsted), No Doubt, The Red Hot Chili Peppers, and U2. Presenters included Macy Gray, Matt LeBlanc, David Spade, "Weird Al" Yankovic, Patricia Arquette, Antonio Banderas, Lara Flynn Boyle, Jenna Elfman, David Alan Grier, Salma Hayek, Sean Hayes, Téa Leoni, Jennifer Lopez, Rob Lowe, Justin Timberlake, Sela Ward and Greg Proops. Reviews were tepid, with Rolling Stone writing that "the event was somewhat undermined by gross production woes, lukewarm performances and the almighty Creed...."

== 2001 ==
Hosted by Eric McCormack. Performers included Sting, Nelly Furtado, Jewel, No Doubt, Creed, Mary J. Blige, Lenny Kravitz, and Mick Jagger. Presenters included Benjamin Bratt, Ellen DeGeneres, Chris Isaak, Christian Slater, Kim Delaney, Jenna Elfman, Kelsey Grammer, Isaac Hayes, Tommy Lee, Henry Simmons, Gary Sinise and Damon Wayans. Dave Matthews Band won the most awards, including the top one, "My Favorite Group."
