= National preparedness level =

American government agency

The United States' National Multi-Agency Coordination Group (MAC) establishes National Preparedness Levels throughout the calendar year to help assure that wildland firefighting resources are ready to respond to new incidents. Preparedness Levels are dictated by burning conditions, fire activity, and especially resource availability.

The five Preparedness Levels range from I to V, with V being the highest level. Each Preparedness Level has specific management directions. As the Preparedness Levels rise, more federal and state employees become available for fire mobilization if needed.

== Preparedness Level I ==
Minimal large fire activity is occurring nationally. Most geographic areas have low to moderate fire danger. There is little or no commitment of national resources.

== Preparedness Level II ==
Several geographic areas are experiencing high to extreme fire danger. Wildland fire activity is increasing and large fires are occurring in one or more geographic areas. Minimal mobilization of resources from other geographic areas is occurring. There is moderate commitment of national resources with the potential to mobilize additional resources from other geographic areas.

== Preparedness Level III ==
Two or more geographic areas are experiencing wildland or prescribed fire activities requiring a major commitment of national resources. Additional resources are being ordered and mobilized through the National Interagency Coordination Center (NICC). Type 1 and Type 2 Incident Management Teams (IMT) are committed in two or more geographic areas and crew commitment nationally is at 50 percent.

== Preparedness Level IV ==
Three or more geographic areas are experiencing incidents requiring Type 1 and 2 IMTs. Competition exists between geographic areas. Nationally, 60 percent of Type 1 and 2 IMTs and crews are committed.

== Preparedness Level V ==
Geographic areas are experiencing major incidents which have the potential to exhaust all agency fire resources. 80 percent of Type 1 and 2 IMTs and crews are committed, as well as the majority of other national resources.

== Current Preparedness Level ==
- Current Preparedness Level is displayed on the NIFC fire info page.
