= National Interagency Fire Center =

American federal government building

Agency overview
- Formed: 1965
- Headquarters: 3833 S. Development Ave. Boise, Idaho, U.S.; 43.567°N 116.209°W
- Website: nifc.gov

Location in the western United States

The National Interagency Fire Center (NIFC) in Boise, Idaho, is an American physical facility which is the home to the National Interagency Coordination Center (NICC) and the National Multi-Agency Coordination Group (NMAC or MAC). The NFIC was originally named the Boise Interagency Fire Center (BIFC).

The center works closely with and is an arm of the National Fire and Aviation Executive Board (NFAEB), which provides unified guidance for fire agencies in the U.S. and handbooks and guidelines to provide standard procedures. It was created to implement the Federal Wildland Fire Management Act Policy. The NFAEB has created the Federal Fire Policy Directives Task Group, which coordinates with state agencies to implement cooperative agreements.

The center's primary mission is the complex interagency coordination of wildland firefighting resources in the U.S. Due to its focus on interagency coordination, the NIFC lacks a single director or leader. Although NIFC was initially founded to manage firefighting resources throughout the western states, the center is now designated as an "all-risk" coordination center, and as such, provides support in response to other emergencies such as floods, hurricanes, and earthquakes for the United States at large; accordingly, it also contributes to the national preparedness level.

== History ==
The U.S. Forest Service, Bureau of Land Management (BLM), and National Weather Service created the BIFC in 1965 to increase their efficiency. The National Park Service and Bureau of Indian Affairs became a part of the BIFC in the mid-1970s and the U.S. Fish and Wildlife Service joined in 1979. Because the organization functions nationally, it was renamed to its current name in 1993. In 2003, the United States Fire Administration, a division of FEMA, became a part of the NIFC.

The Wildland Firefighters National Monument was dedicated on May 25, 2000, and is on the grounds of the NIFC's headquarters in Boise. It was created after the South Canyon Fire to honor firefighters.

== Escalation of fire coordination ==
=== Tier 3 - Local Control ===
Any wildland fire is initially managed by the local agency responsible for fire protection in its jurisdiction. Multiple local agencies can also collaborate to manage fires. Engines, ground crews, hotshots, smokejumpers, helicopters with water buckets, and air tankers may all be used for initial suppression.

=== Tier 2 - Geographic Area Coordination Center(s) ===
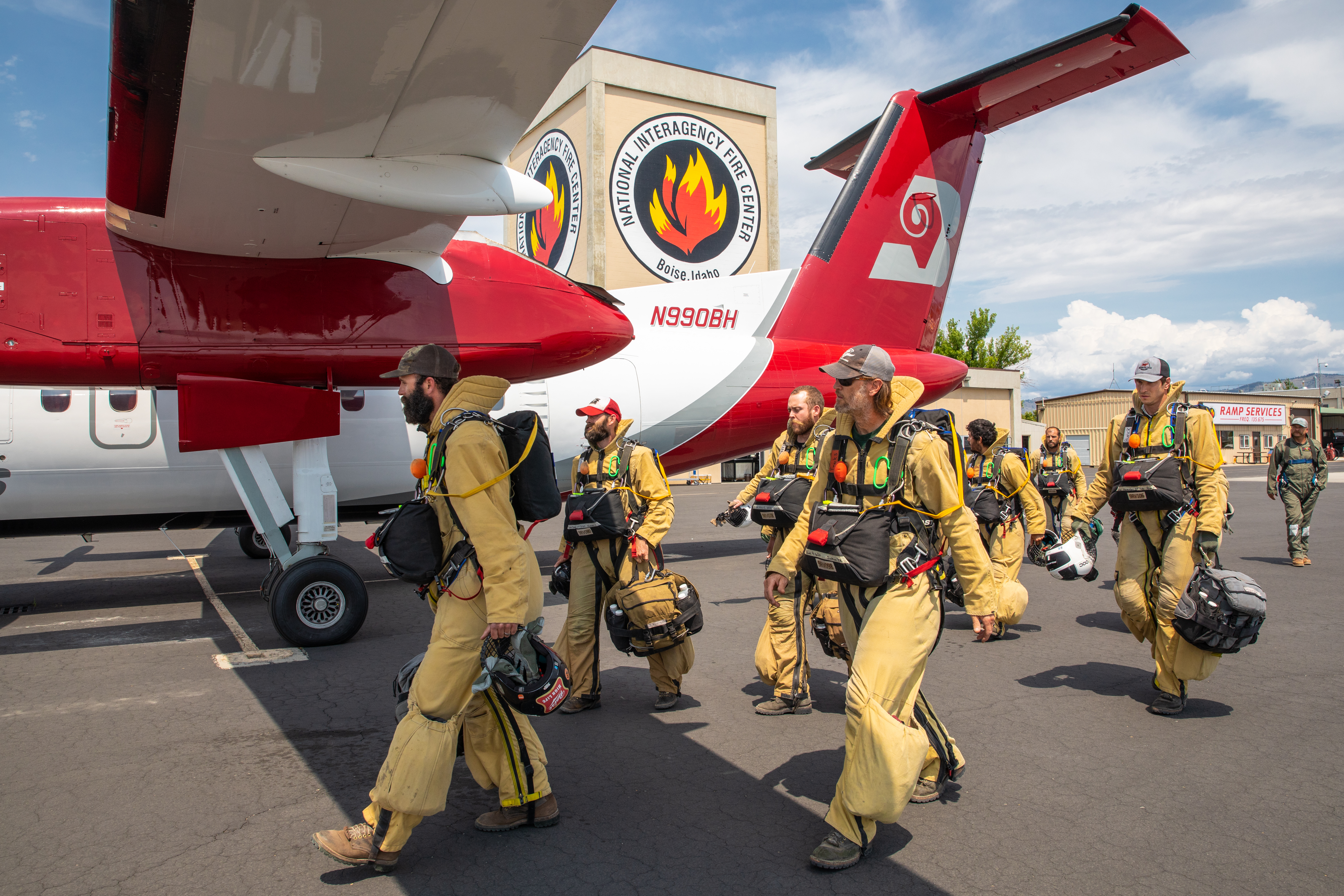
Bureau of Land Management smokejumpers prepare for a training jump at the National Interagency Fire Center.

The NICC divides the United States into 10 geographic areas. If a wildland fire grows to the point where local personnel and equipment are insufficient, the local agency can contact their respective Geographic Area Coordination Center (GACC) for help. The GACC will dispatch a Type 2 Incident Management Team (IMT) and locate and dispatch additional firefighters and support personnel throughout the geographic area at risk.

=== Tier 1 - National Interagency Coordination Center ===
When the emergency exceeds the GACC's resources, the GACC can request help from the National Interagency Coordination Center (NICC) at the National Interagency Fire Center (NIFC). In that case, NICC will dispatch a Type 1 Incident Management Team and additional national resources from multiple agencies as required.

=== National Multi-Agency Coordination Group ===
The National Multi-Agency Coordination Group (NMAC or MAC) also resides at the NIFC. If several simultaneous national emergencies are straining the support system, it allocates and prioritizes personnel and equipment.

MAC also establishes the National Preparedness Levels throughout the calendar year to help ensure firefighting resources are ready and able to respond to probable new incidents (a form of risk management). Preparedness Levels are dictated by burning conditions, fire activity, and (especially) resource availability.

== Participating agencies ==
Several national and state assets are involved at NIFC:

- U.S. Department of Agriculture and related...
  - United States Forest Service (USFS)
- U.S. Department of Commerce
  - U.S. National Weather Service (NWS)
- U.S. Department of Homeland Security and related...
  - Federal Emergency Management Agency (FEMA)
  - United States Fire Administration
- U.S. Department of the Interior, and related...
  - Bureau of Indian Affairs (BIA)
  - Bureau of Land Management (BLM)
  - Fish and Wildlife Service (FWS)
  - National Park Service (NPS)
  - Office of Aircraft Services (OAS)
  - United States Wildland Fire Service (USWFS)

And the non-profit organization:

- National Association of State Foresters (NASF)

== See also ==
- Resource Ordering Status System
- United States Fire Administration
- Wildfires in the United States
- Boise Fire Department
- USA.gov
