= Diana (Saint-Gaudens) =

Statue by Augustus Saint-Gaudens

Diana (second version)
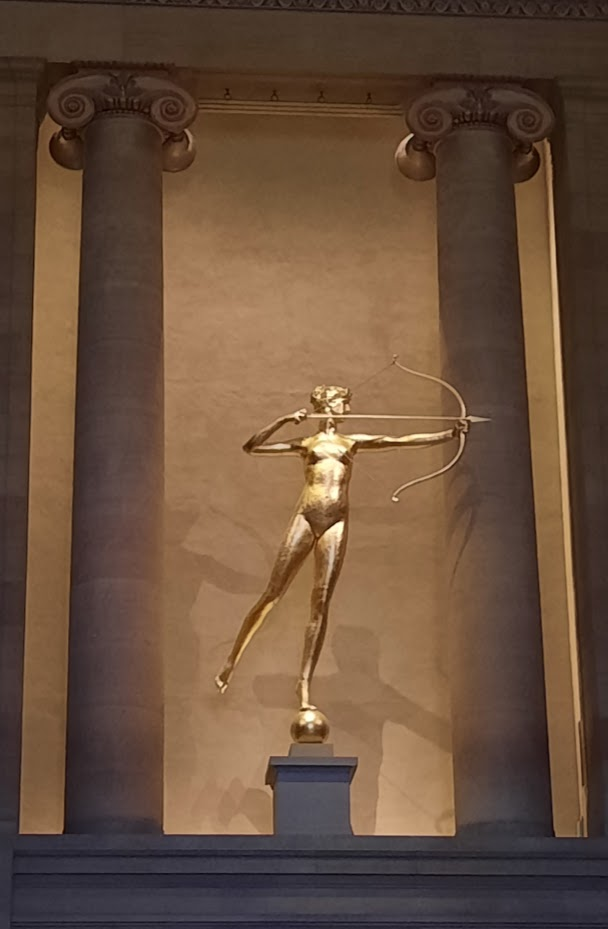
- Diana (second version), restored, at the Philadelphia Museum of Art
- Artist: Augustus Saint-Gaudens
- Year: 1892–93
- Type: copper sheeting
- Dimensions: 440 cm (14.5 ft)
- Location: Philadelphia Museum of Art, Philadelphia

For the statue of Princess Diana, see Statue of Diana, Princess of Wales

Diana – also known as Diana of the Tower – is an iconic statue by sculptor Augustus Saint-Gaudens, representing the goddess Diana. Once a major artistic feature of New York City, the second version stood atop the tower of Madison Square Garden from 1893 to 1925. Since 1932, it has been in the collection of the Philadelphia Museum of Art.

== First version (1891–92) ==
Diana was commissioned by architect Stanford White as a weather vane for the tower of Madison Square Garden, a theater-and-dining complex at 26th Street and Madison Avenue in Manhattan. He talked his friend Saint-Gaudens into creating it at no charge, and picked up the cost of materials. Model Julia "Dudie" Baird posed for the body of the statue. Its face is that of Davida Johnson Clark, Saint-Gaudens's long-time model and mother of his illegitimate son Louis. The artist/journalist Lillian Baynes Griffin, writing in the Illustrated American in 1895, claimed the original model for Diana was Lillie Daly.

The first version – built by the W. H. Mullins Manufacturing Company in Salem, Ohio – was 18 ft (5.5 m) tall and weighed 1,800 lb (820 kg). Saint-Gaudens's design specified that the figure appear to delicately balance on its left toe atop a ball. However, the Ohio metal shop was unable to pass the rotating rod through the toe, so the design was altered and the figure instead was poised (less-gracefully) on its heel.

Diana was unveiled atop Madison Square Garden's tower on September 29, 1891. The 304-foot (92.66 m) building had been completed a year earlier, and was the second-tallest in New York City. But the addition of the statue made it the city's tallest, by 13 feet (3.96 m). The figure's billowing copper foulard (scarf) was intended to catch the wind, but the statue did not rotate smoothly because of its weight. Diana's nudity offended moral crusader Anthony Comstock and his New York Society for the Suppression of Vice. To placate Comstock and to increase the likelihood of its catching the wind, Saint-Gaudens draped the figure in cloth, but the cloth blew away.

Soon after installation, both White and Saint-Gaudens concluded that the figure was too large for the building, and decided to create a smaller, lighter replacement. Following less than a year atop the tower, the statue was removed and shipped to Chicago to be exhibited at the 1893 World's Columbian Exposition. New Yorker W. T. Henderson wrote a tongue-in-cheek poetic tribute – "Diana Off the Tower" – a play on both the statue's name and situation.

Saint-Gaudens served as head of the Chicago exposition's sculpture committee. His initial plan had been to place Diana atop the Women's Pavilion, but the city's Women's Christian Temperance Union protested and insisted that the controversial nude figure be clothed. Instead, it was placed atop the Agricultural Building.

The original Diana does not survive. In June 1894, eight months after the exposition's closing, a major fire tore through its buildings. The lower half of the statue was destroyed; the upper half survived the fire, but was later lost or discarded.

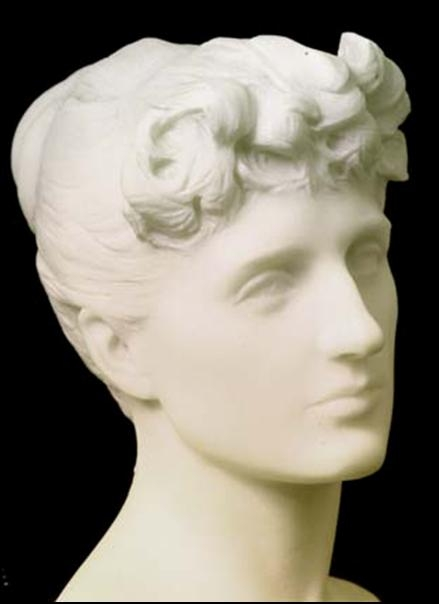
Bust of Davida Johnson Clark (1886) by Saint-Gaudens.

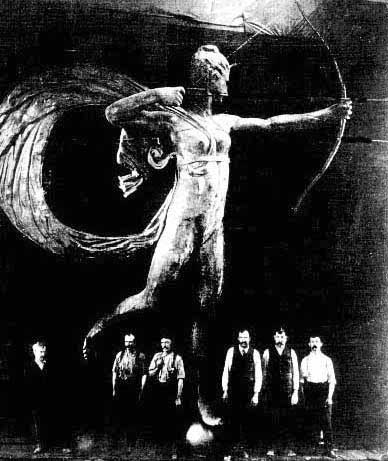
First version of Diana in the foundry of the W. H. Mullins Manufacturing Company, Salem, Ohio, 1891.

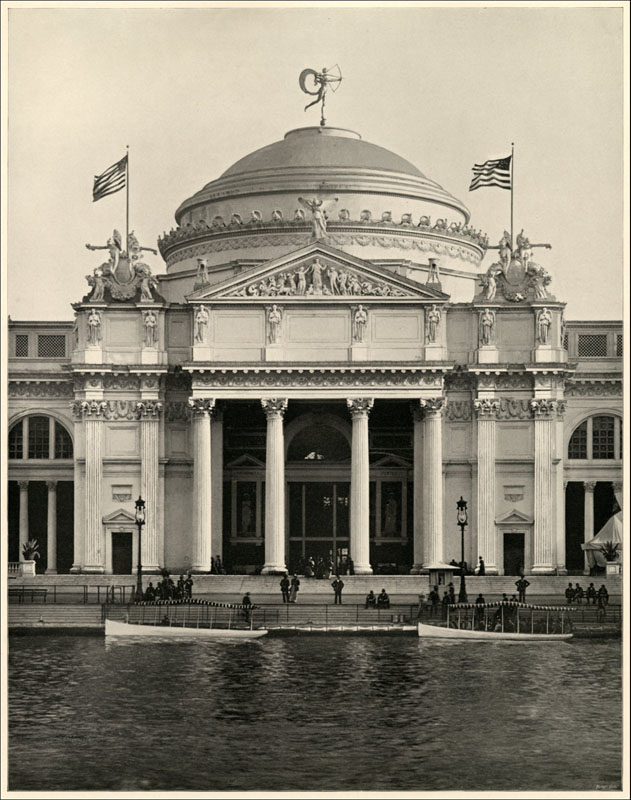
Atop the Agriculture Building, World's Columbian Exposition, Chicago, 1893.

== Second version (1893–present) ==
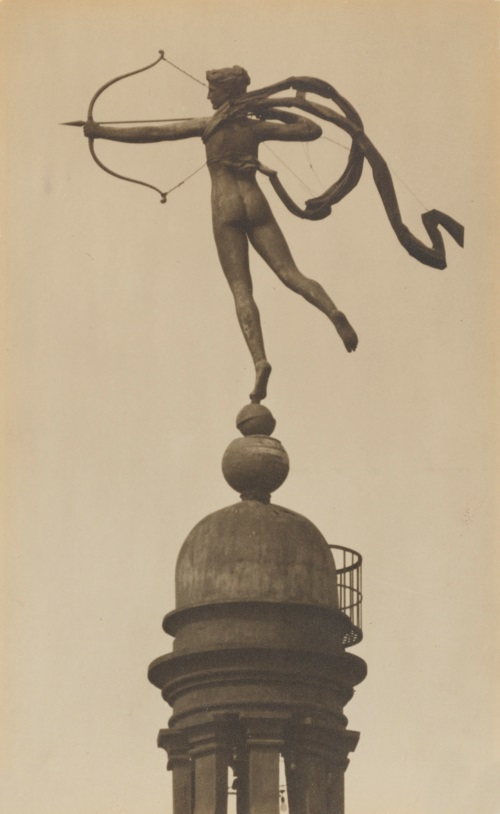
Second version of Diana with her copper foulard.

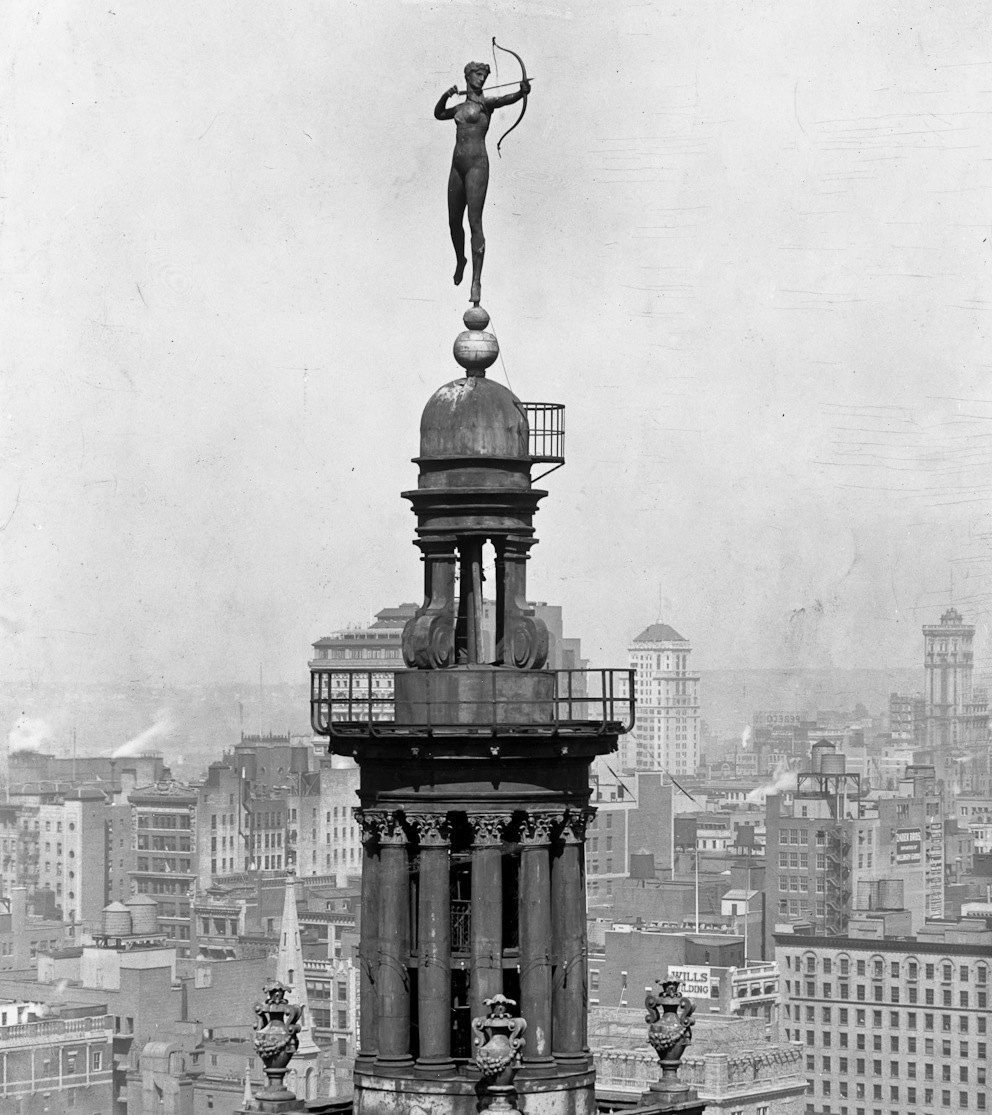
Diana atop Madison Square Garden (c. 1905)

Diana was completely redesigned by Saint-Gaudens – with a more elegant pose, a different thrust to the body, a thinner figure, smaller breasts and a more graceful angle to the leg. To better fit the proportions of Madison Square Garden's tower, the statue's height was scaled down to 14.5 feet (4.4 m). The second version was made of hollowed copper, and weighed 700 lb (318 kg) – more than 60% less than the first version – light enough to rotate with the wind. As Saint-Gaudens originally envisioned, the figure was balanced on its left toe atop a ball. The statue was hoisted to the top of the tower on November 18, 1893.

During the day, the gilded figure caught the sun and could be seen from all over the city and as far away as New Jersey. Electric lights, then a novelty, illuminated it at night; it was the first statue in history to be lit by electricity.

Madison Square Garden was slated to be demolished in 1925 to make way for construction of the New York Life Building. Prior to the building's demolition, Diana was removed and put in storage. The intention was for the statue to remain in New York City, however a seven year search to find a place to display it proved futile. In 1932, the New York Life Insurance Company presented Diana to the Philadelphia Museum of Art as a gift. It remains displayed on the balcony of the museum's Great Stair Hall.

=== Restoration ===
When Diana was removed from Madison Square Garden in 1925, much of its gilded exterior was gone, having eroded away over three decades of exposure to the elements. The Philadelphia Museum of Art cleaned and repaired the statue in 1932, but the gold leaf was not replaced.

In 2013, scaffolding was constructed around the statue in the museum's Great Stair Hall for a year-long restoration. Conservators carefully cleaned its copper surface with chemicals and steam, removing nearly a century of dirt and grime. Samples of the small patches of remaining gold leaf on the statue were taken in an effort to match the carat, weight and color with its replacement. The statue's surface was then repaired and regilded with 180 square feet of gold leaf. Because it was known from contemporary sources that Saint-Gaudens did not like the look of bright gold at eye level, the conservators matted the gilding to reduce the glare and museum lighting designers adjusted the display lights for the interior display.

On July 14, 2014, the restored statue was unveiled and rededicated.

=== Cultural references ===
In the popular 1975 novel Ragtime, author E.L. Doctorow suggests in a single line that showgirl Evelyn Nesbitt had posed for the second version of the Diana statue. Having grown up poor in the streets of a Pennsylvania coal town, Nesbitt had risen up to become “the Gaudens statue Stanny White had put at the top of the tower of Madison Square Garden, a glorious bronze nude Diana, her bow drawn, her face in the skies.”

The 1981 film version of Ragtime expanded upon this incident as the cause of a major conflict between Stanford White and Nesbitt's millionaire husband Harry K. Thaw. In the film, Thaw demands that the statue be taken down from the top of the Garden as it is an embarrassment to him. The character is seen glaring angrily at the statue before shooting White to death at the Rooftop Theatre at Madison Square Garden on June 25, 1906.

Both situations are completely fictional. The second version of Diana was placed atop the tower in 1893, when Nesbitt was only about nine years old, and eight years before she was introduced to White.

O. Henry's short story "The Lady Higher Up" features a nighttime conversation between Diana and the Statue of Liberty.

The 1993 graphic novel "Batman Houdini: The Devil's Workshop" shows one of the statuettes of the Saint-Gaudens Diana in the foreground of one panel.

== Other versions ==
=== Half-sized statues ===
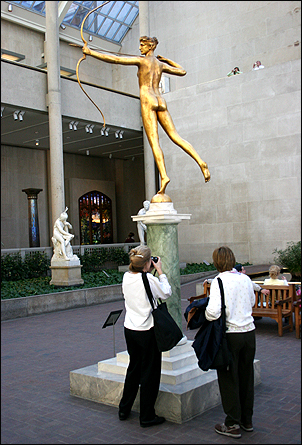
Half-sized Diana (1928), Metropolitan Museum of Art.

Stanford White was so pleased with the 1893 second version that he asked Saint-Gaudens to create a half-sized copy in cement. This was installed in 1894 in the garden of White's Long Island estate, Box Hill, where it stood for many years. For the half-sized copy, Saint-Gaudens poised the figure on a half-ball. White's cement statue later was used to produce two bronze casts in 1928, and six bronze casts in 1987. The cement statue is now in the collection of the Amon Carter Museum of American Art.

- Saint-Gaudens National Historic Site, plaster. Saint-Gaudens's 1894 model.
- Amon Carter Museum of American Art, cement. Stanford White's 1894 copy.
- 1928 casts
  - Metropolitan Museum of Art, gilded bronze
  - Bass Hall, Fort Worth, Texas, bronze
- 1987 casts
  - Madison Square Garden, New York City, bronze
  - Dock of New York, Seville, bronze
  - Brookgreen Gardens, bronze
  - Princeton University Art Museum, bronze
  - Private collection, Saint-James, New York, bronze
  - Private collection, Chicago, Illinois, bronze
  - Private collection, Santa Fe, New Mexico, bronze

=== Statuettes ===
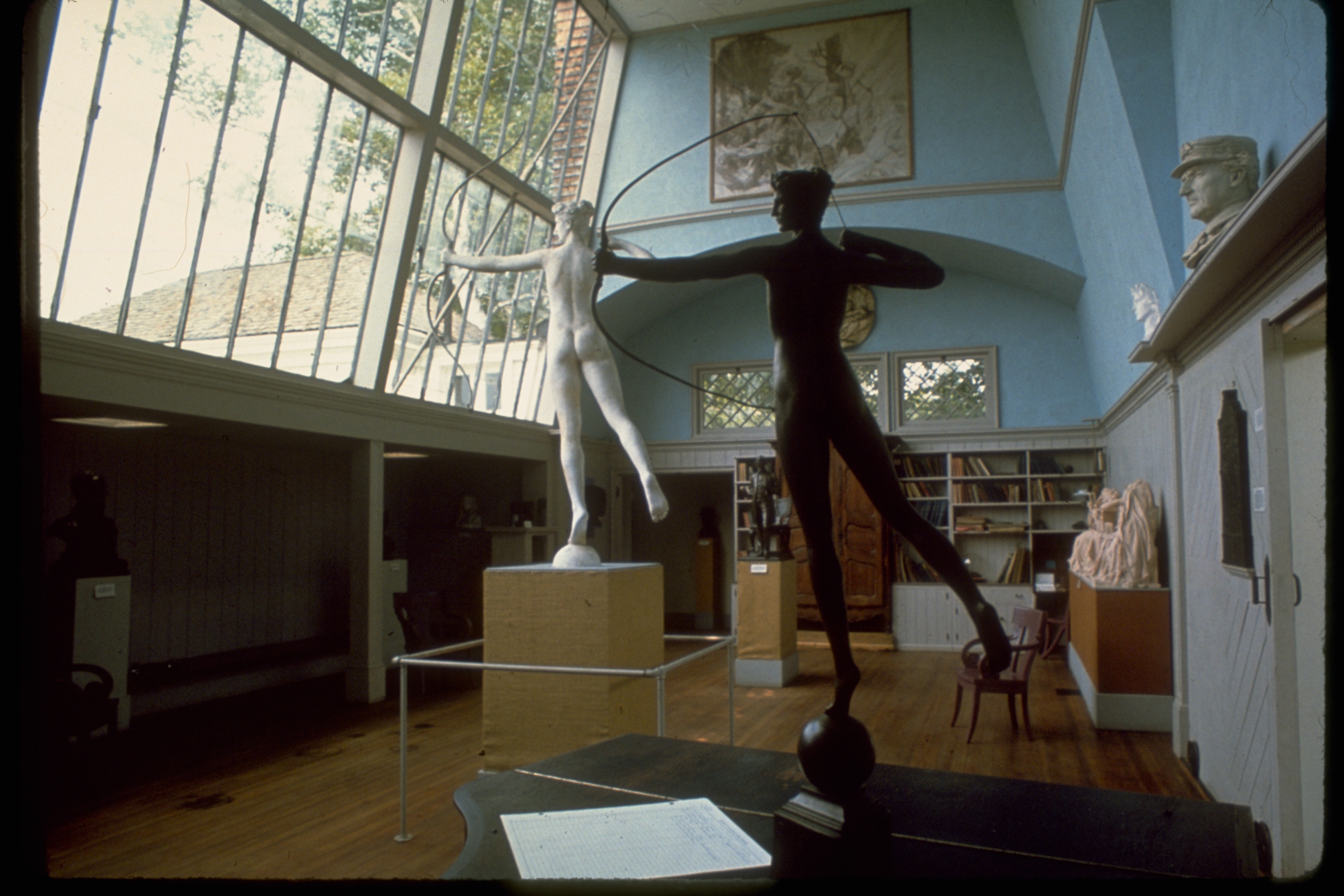
Statuette (foreground) and half-sized plaster model (background), Saint-Gaudens National Historic Site.

The Smithsonian American Art Museum owns a bronze statuette of Saint-Gaudens's first version of Diana.

Capitalizing on the popularity of the second version, Saint-Gaudens modeled statuettes in two sizes: 31 inches (78 cm), with the figure poised on a half-ball, and 21 inches (53 cm), with the figure poised on a full ball. These were cast in bronze beginning in 1899, and vary in the configuration of bow, arrow, string, hair, patination, and base.

- National Gallery of Art, bronze
- Metropolitan Museum of Art, bronze
- Indianapolis Museum of Art, bronze
- Cleveland Museum of Art, bronze
- Williams College Museum of Art, bronze
- Saint-Gaudens National Historic Site, bronze
- New York Historical Society, bronze
- Brooklyn Museum, bronze
- Virginia Museum of Fine Arts, bronze
- Yale University Art Gallery, bronze
- other museum and private collections.

=== Busts and heads ===
In 1908, the sculptor's widow authorized a posthumous casting of nine busts based on Saint-Gaudens's 31-inch (78 cm) statuette. A 7-3/8 in (18.7 cm) plaster bust is at Saint-Gaudens National Historic Site. Bronze busts are at the Carnegie Museum of Art, and in private collections.

Bronze casts of Diana's head are at Saint-Gaudens National Historic Site; Harvard University; and elsewhere.

== Gallery ==
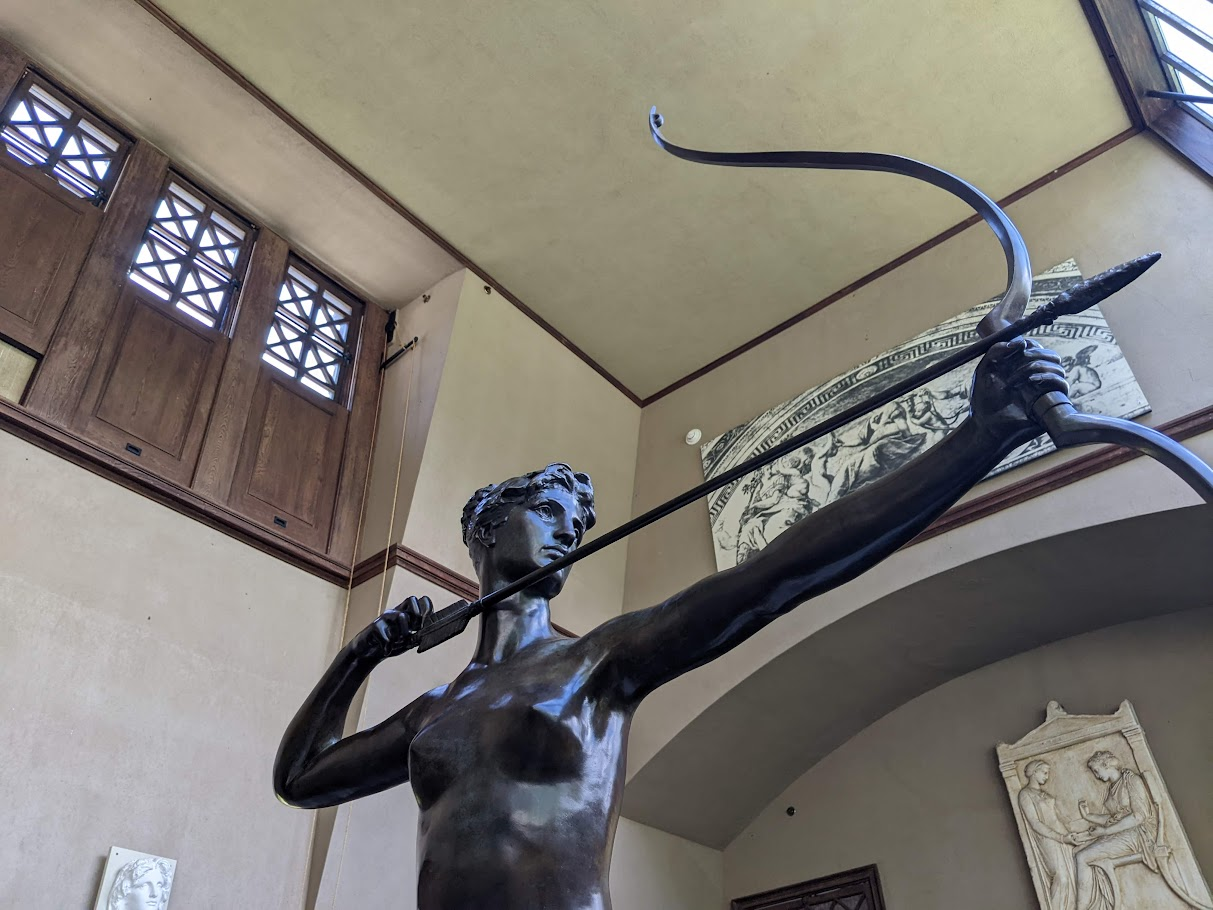
Detail of a reproduction of "Diana" in Cornish, NH

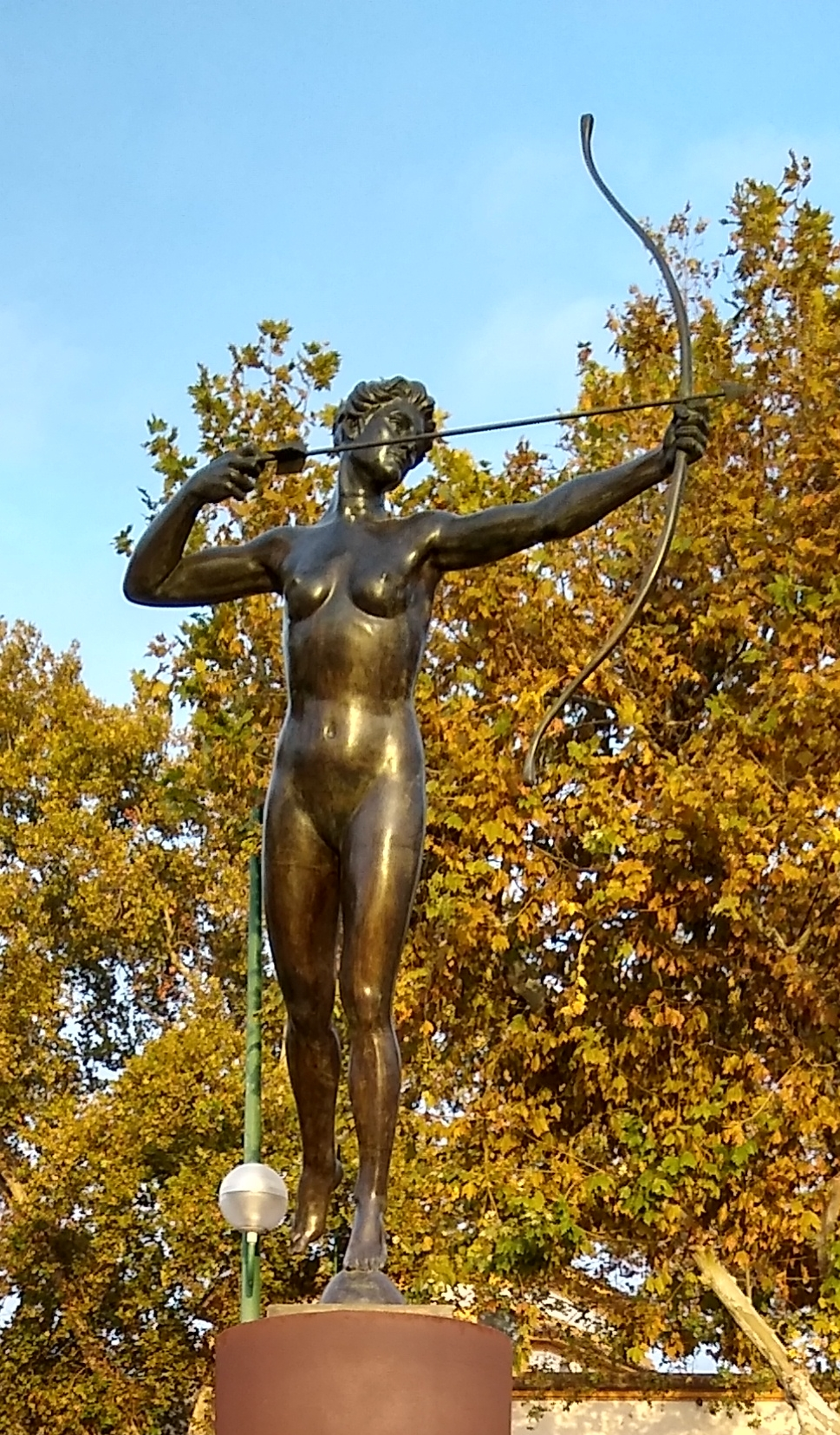
Reproduction in Seville.

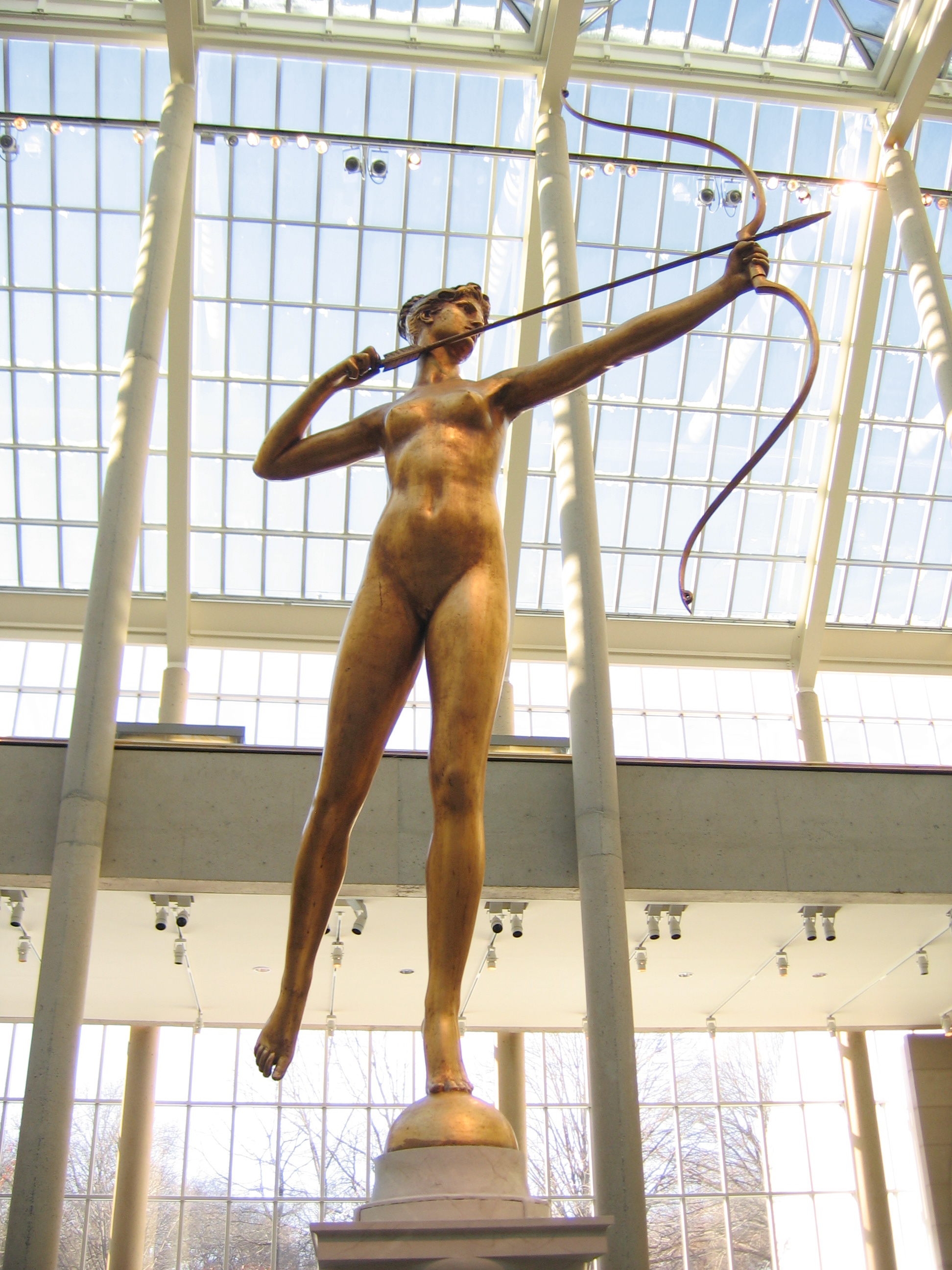
Reproduction at the Metropolitan Museum of Art in New York City
