= Wildland Firefighters National Monument =

Coordinates: 43°33′59″N 116°12′35″W

- Location: National Interagency Fire Center (NIFC); Boise, Idaho, U.S.
- Designer: Lawrence Nowlan
- Material: Bronze
- Height: 8 feet (2.4 m)
- Dedicated date: May 25, 2000; 25 years ago
- Dedicated to: wildland and wildfire firefighters

The Wildland Firefighters National Monument is an American monument and memorial dedicated to wildland and wildfire firefighters. Located on an acre of land on the grounds of the National Interagency Fire Center in Boise, Idaho, it was dedicated on May 25, 2000.

== History ==
In early July 1994, fourteen firefighters were killed fighting the South Canyon Fire on Storm King Mountain, near Glenwood Springs, Colorado. The Wildland Firefighter Foundation, an organization which assists fallen firefighters and their families, began to seek a way to honor the fourteen firefighters and others who had died in the line of duty, leading to the idea for the present monument.

== Memorial ==
The site of the monument and its surrounding park was originally a parking lot.

Three eight-foot (2.4 m) tall, bronze statues of firefighters, which were designed and created by American sculptor Lawrence Nowlan, are the centerpiece of the monument. A waterfall feature was designed by Bill Mitchell and Hugh Carson, both Fire Center employees. Mr. Carson, a former stone mason, spent two summers building the water feature, with daily assistance from the Boise Smokejumpers, who mixed cement and placed rocks in place that they had gathered from a local quarry. Ted Rex used a large front-end loader to gather several larger rocks, one weighing four tons which required the largest crane in Boise to place.

The monument and sculptures are surrounded by one acre (0.40 ha) of land. A walkway, with commemorative granite stones inscribed with the names of donors and other supporters, brings visitors through the park leads to the memorial. The surrounding area has been landscaped using native trees, wildflowers, shrubs and grass which are native to Idaho.

A replica of one of Lawrence Nowlan's firefighter sculptures was installed in Prescott, Arizona, in August 2013, to commemorate the lives of nineteen firefighters killed in the Yarnell Hill Fire of June 2013.

== See also ==
- List of firefighting monuments and memorials
