= Preparatory school =

Preparatory school or prep school may refer to:

== Schools ==
- Preparatory school (United Kingdom), a fee-charging private primary school
- College-preparatory school, a type of secondary school in the United States and Japan
- Classe préparatoire aux grandes écoles (Higher school preparatory classes), part of the French post-secondary education system

== Arts and entertainment ==
- Prep School, a 2015 American film starring Carly Schroeder

== See also ==
- Preschool, for early childhood education
- Prep (disambiguation)
- Preppie (disambiguation)
- Prepper (disambiguation)
