= Preparedness department =

Preparedness department or variations may refer to:

- Department of Public Safety and Emergency Preparedness (Canada)
  - Minister of Public Safety and Emergency Preparedness (Canada)
- Canadian Center for Emergency Preparedness
- Center for Domestic Preparedness (U.S.)
- Center for Public Health Preparedness (U.S.)
- United States House Homeland Security Subcommittee on Emergency Preparedness, Response and Recovery
- Office of the Assistant Secretary for Preparedness and Response (U.S.)
- National Domestic Preparedness Consortium (U.S.) training program
- New Jersey Office of Homeland Security and Preparedness (U.S.)
- Emergency Preparedness Operational Command Unit (UK) of London
- Office of Disaster Preparedness and Emergency Management (Jamaica)
- Ministry of Disaster Preparedness and Refugees (Uganda)
- Disaster Preparedness and Response Team (Pakistan)
