= LEPC =

LEPC or Lepc may refer to:

- Lepcha script (ISO 15924 code)
- Local Emergency Planning Committee, community-based organization that assist in preparing for emergencies
