= Preparedness (disambiguation) =

Preparedness refers to actions that are taken as precautionary measures in the face of potential disasters.

Preparedness may also refer to:

- Emergency preparedness, a phase of emergency management
- Preparedness (learning), a concept to explain why certain things are easier to learn than others

== See also ==
- Prep (disambiguation)
- Prepare (disambiguation)
- Preparation (disambiguation)
- Preparedness Act (disambiguation)
- Preparedness department (disambiguation)
- Preparedness 101: Zombie Apocalypse, a U.S. CDC blog post
- Preparedness Movement (U.S. politics) of Leonard Wood and Theodore Roosevelt to ready the U.S. military
  - Preparedness Day (22 July)
    - Preparedness Day Bombing (22 July 1916) in San Francisco
- National preparedness level (U.S.) for wildfires
- National Preparedness Month of the United States
