= Community emergency response team =

American emergency response program

Community Emergency Response Team
- Community Emergency Response Team (CERT) logo
- Abbreviation: CERT
- Formation: 1993
- Type: Nonprofit
- President: Suu-Va Tai
- Parent organization: Citizen Corps
- Website: www.fema.gov/community-emergency-response-teams

In the United States, Community Emergency Response Team (CERT) can refer to

- an implementation of FEMA's National CERT Program, administered by a local sponsoring agency, which provides a standardized training and implementation framework to community members;
- an organization of volunteer emergency workers who have received specific training in basic disaster response skills, and who agree to supplement existing emergency responders in the event of a major disaster.

Sometimes programs and organizations take different names, such as neighborhood emergency response team (NERT), or neighborhood emergency team (NET).

The concept of civilian auxiliaries is similar to civil defense, which has a longer history. The CERT concept differs because it includes nonmilitary emergencies, and is coordinated with all levels of emergency authorities, local to national, via an overarching incident command system.

In 2022, the CERT program moved under FEMA's community preparedness umbrella along with the Youth Preparedness Council.

== Organization ==
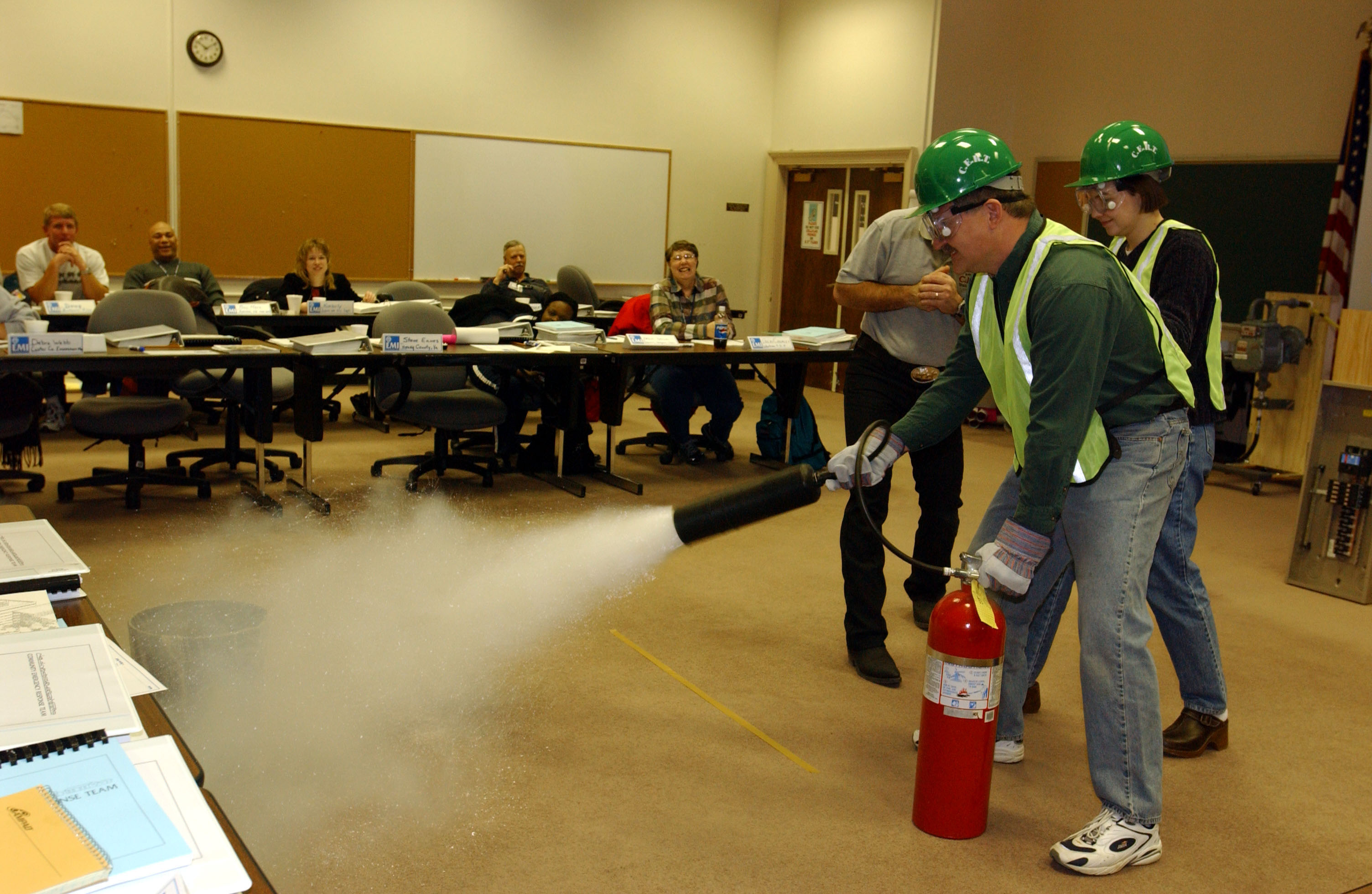
A CERT volunteer practices using a fire extinguisher.

A local government agency, often a fire department, police department, or emergency management agency, agrees to sponsor CERT within its jurisdiction. The sponsoring agency liaises with, deploys and may train or supervise the training of CERT members. Many sponsoring agencies employ a full-time community-service person as liaison to the CERT members. In some communities, the liaison is a volunteer and CERT member.

As people are trained and agree to join the community emergency response effort, a CERT is formed. Initial efforts may result in a team with only a few members from across the community. As the number of members grow, a single community-wide team may subdivide. Multiple CERTs are organized into a hierarchy of teams consistent with the principles of the Incident Command System (ICS), which is a management system used by emergency responders. The ideal of team distribution is one or more teams in each neighborhood within a community.

A teen community emergency response team (teen CERT), or student emergency response team (SERT), can be formed from any group of teens. A teen CERT can be formed as a school club, service organization, venturing crew, explorer post, or the training can be added to a school's graduation curriculum. Some CERTs form a club or service corporation, and recruit volunteers to perform training on behalf of the sponsoring agency. This reduces the financial and human resource burden on the sponsoring agency.

When not responding to disasters or large emergencies, CERTs may:

- raise funds for emergency response equipment in their community
- provide first-aid, crowd control or other services at community events
- hold planning, training, or recruitment meetings
- conduct or participate in disaster response exercises

Some sponsoring agencies use state and federal grants to purchase response tools and equipment for their members and teams (subject to Stafford Act limitations). Most CERTs also acquire their own supplies, tools, and equipment. As community members, CERTs are aware of the specific needs of their community, and equip the teams accordingly.

== Response ==
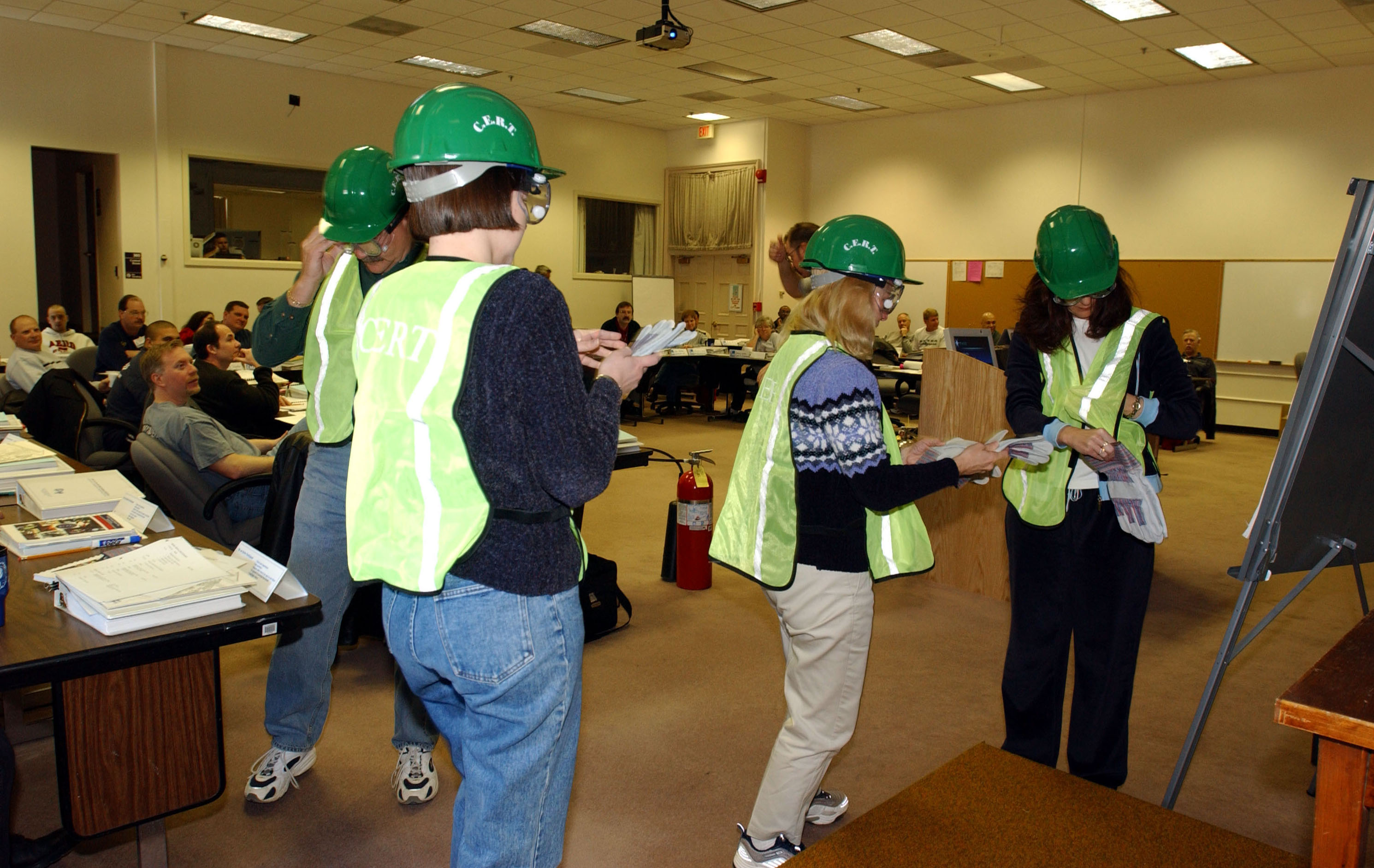
CERT volunteers try on their equipment

The basic idea is to use CERT to perform the large number of tasks needed in emergencies. This frees highly trained professional responders for more technical tasks. Much of CERT training concerns the ICS and organization, so CERT members fit easily into larger command structures.

A team member may self-activate (self-deploy) when their own neighborhood or current location is affected by an incident. An effort is made to report their response status to the sponsoring agency. A self-activated team will size up the loss in their neighborhood and begin performing the skills they have learned to minimize further loss of life, property, and environment. They will continue to respond safely until redirected or relieved by the sponsoring agency or professional responders on-scene.

Teams in neighborhoods not affected by disaster may be deployed or activated by the sponsoring agency. Teams may be activated and dispatched to gather or respond to intelligence about an incident.

In the short term, CERTs perform data gathering, especially to locate mass-casualties requiring professional response, or situations requiring professional rescues, simple fire-fighting tasks (for example, small fires, turning off gas), light search and rescue, damage evaluation of structures, triage and first aid. In the longer term, CERTs may assist in the evacuation of residents, or assist with setting up a neighborhood shelter.

While responding, CERT members are temporary volunteer government workers subject to local and state laws about compensation for injuries sustained while activated. In some states, activated CERT members are eligible for worker's compensation. In California, activated CERT members may be covered under their sponsoring agency's insurance.

== Member roles ==
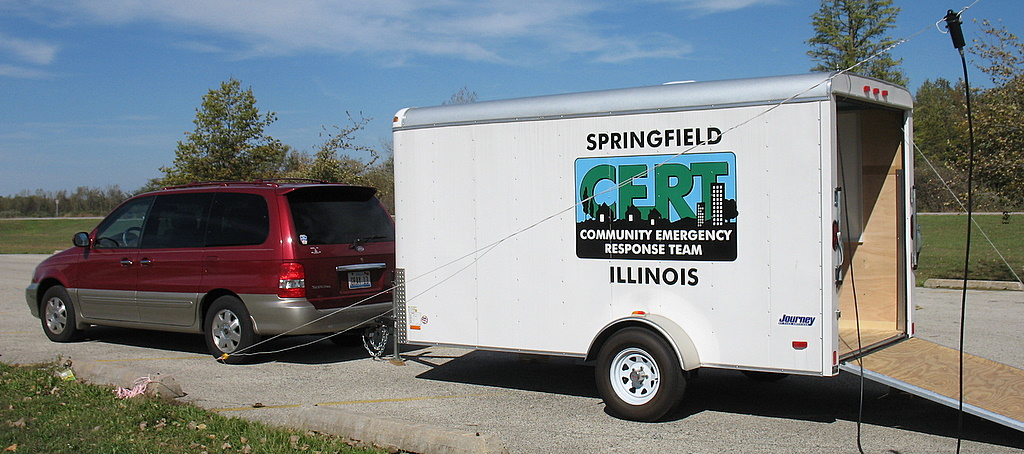
An equipment trailer belonging to the Springfield, Illinois CERT program.

The Federal Emergency Management Agency (FEMA) recommends that the standard, minimum ten-person team be comprised as follows:

- CERT leader/incident commander. Generally, the first CERT team member arriving on the scene is the designated incident commander (IC) until the arrival of someone more competent. This person makes the IC initial assessment of the scene and determines the appropriate course of action for team members; assumes role of safety officer until assigned to another team member; assigns team member roles if not already assigned; designates triage area, treatment area, morgue, and vehicle traffic routes; coordinates and directs team operations; determines logistical needs (water, food, medical supplies, transportation, equipment, and so on) and determines ways to meet those needs through team members or citizen volunteers on the scene; collects and writes reports on the operation and victims; and communicates and coordinates with the incident commander, local authorities, and other CERT team leaders. The IC is identified by two pieces of crossed tape on the hard hat.
- Safety officer/dispatch. Checks team members prior to deployment to ensure they are safe and equipped for the operation; determines safe or unsafe working environments; ensures team accountability; supervises operations (when possible) where team members and victims are at direct physical risk, and alerts team members when unsafe conditions arise. Advises team members of any updates on the situation. Keeps tabs on the situation as it unfolds
- Fire suppression team (2 people). Work under the supervision of a team leader to suppress small fires in designated work areas or as needed; when not accomplishing their primary mission, assist the search and rescue team or triage team; assist in evacuation and transport as needed; assist in the triage or treatment area as needed, other duties as assigned; communicate with Team Leader.
- Search and rescue team/extraction (2). Work under the supervision of a team leader, searching for and providing rescue of victims as is prudent under the conditions, also bringing injured people to triage or the hospital for medical treatment; when not accomplishing their primary mission, assist the fire suppression team, assist in the triage or treatment area as needed; other duties as assigned; communicate with team leader.
- Medical triage team/field medic (2). Work under the supervision of a team leader, providing START triage for victims found at the scene; marking victims with category of injury per the standard operating procedures; when not accomplishing their primary mission, assist the fire suppression team if needed, assist the search and rescue team if needed, assist in the medical triage area if needed, assist in the treatment area if needed, other duties as assigned; communicate with IC.
- Medical treatment team (2). Work under the supervision of the team leader, providing medical treatment to victims within the scope of their training. This task is normally accomplished in the treatment area, however, it may take place in the affected area as well. When not accomplishing their primary mission, assist the fire suppression team as needed, assist the medical triage team as needed; other duties as assigned; communicate with the team leader.
- Team leader. Supervises designated tasks they are assigned to. Gives reports to dispatch and IC.

Because every CERT member in a community receives the same core instruction, any team member has the training necessary to assume any of these roles. This is important during a disaster response because not all members of a regular team may be available to respond. Hasty teams may be formed by whichever members are responding at the time. Additionally, members may need to adjust team roles due to stress, fatigue, injury, or other circumstances.

== Training ==
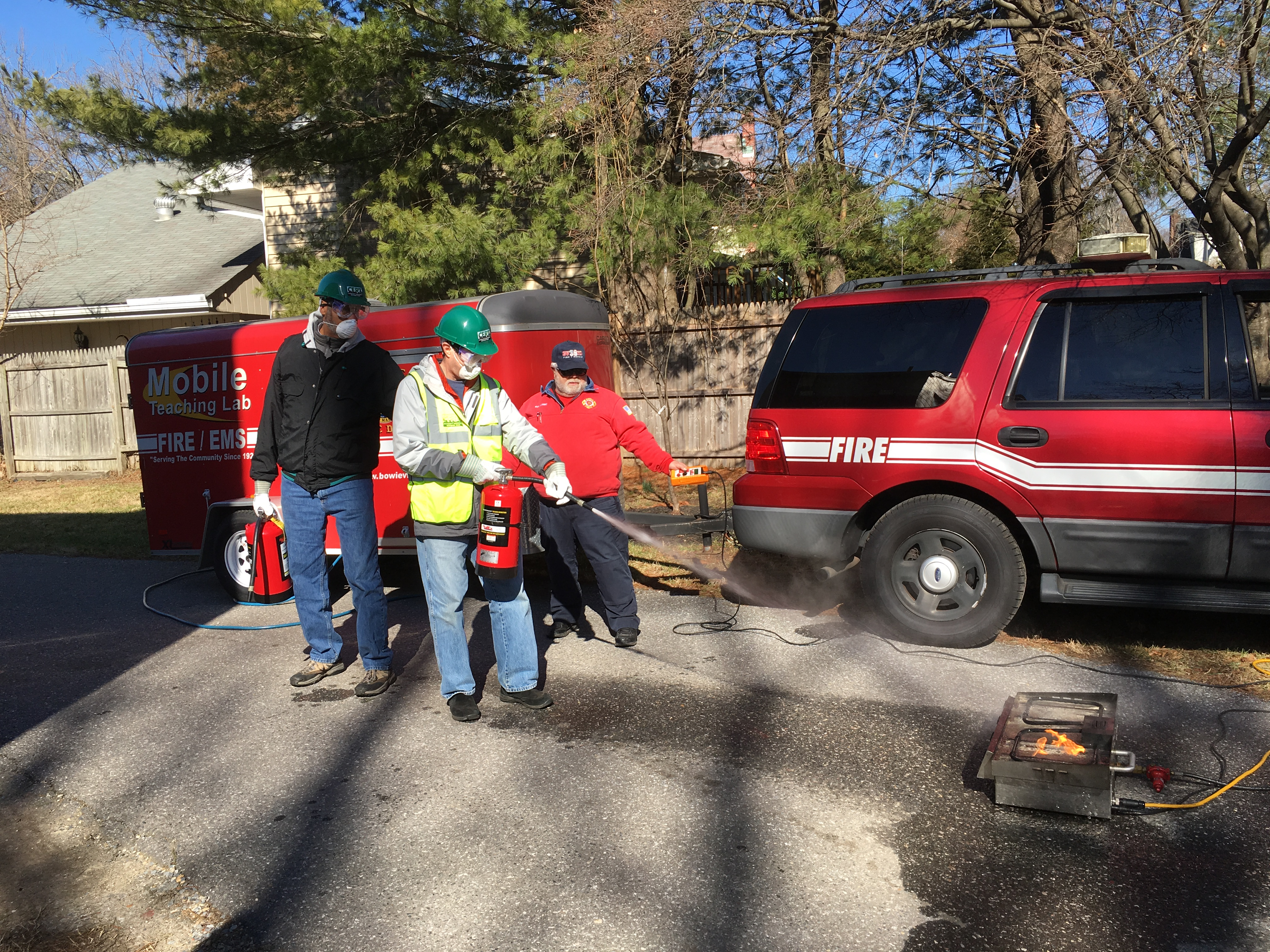
On February 5, 2017, community emergency response team training in Berwyn Heights, Maryland, with two members putting out a fire

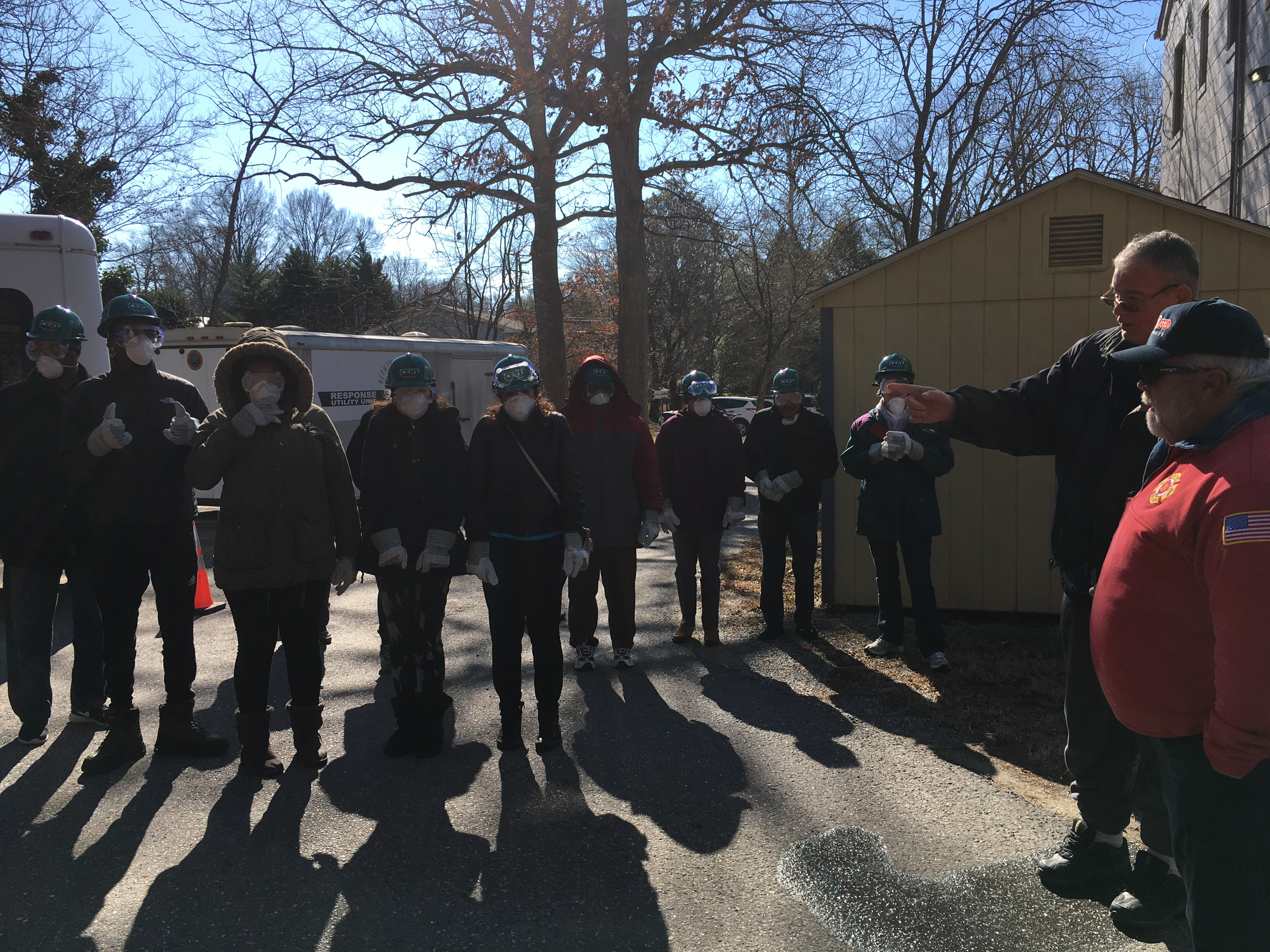
On February 5, 2017, community emergency response team training while in gear.

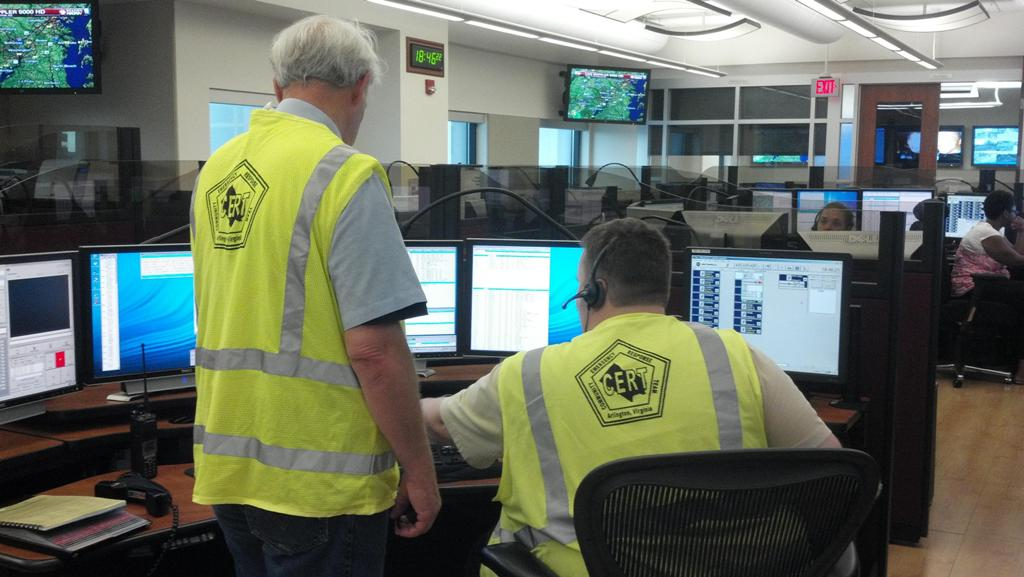
Arlington Community Emergency Response Team (CERT) provided back-up support to the county's 911 system.

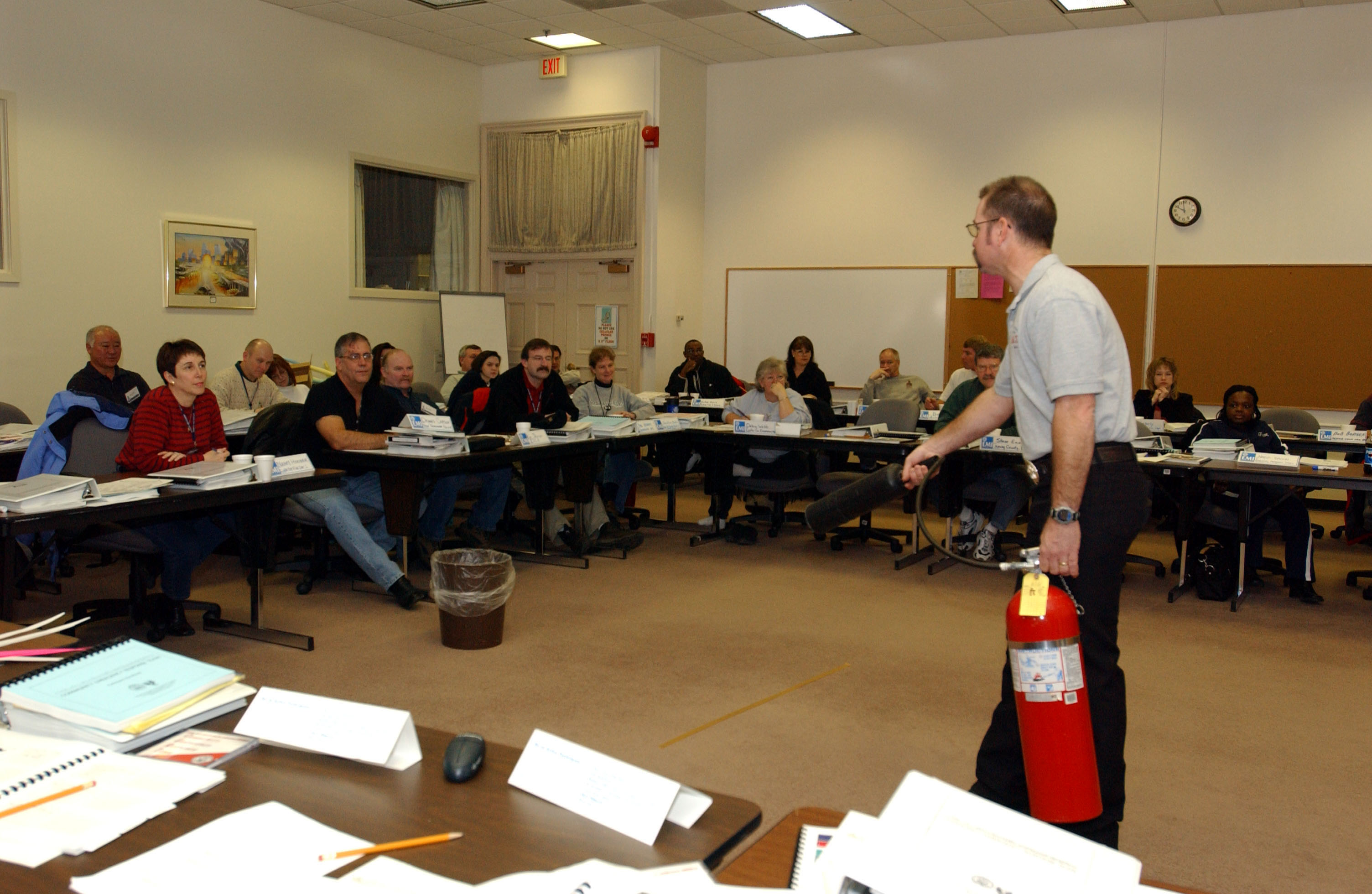
CERT volunteers during the classroom portion of their training.

While state and local jurisdictions will implement training in the manner that best suits the community, FEMA's National CERT Program has an established curriculum. Jurisdictions may augment the training, but should never delete topics. The CERT core curriculum for the basic course is composed of the following nine units (time is instructional hours):

- Unit 1: Disaster preparedness (2.5 hrs). Topics include (in part) identifying local disaster threats, disaster impact, mitigation and preparedness concepts, and an overview of citizen corps and CERT. Hands on skills include team-building exercises, and shutting off utilities.
- Unit 2: Fire safety (2.5 hrs). Students learn about fire chemistry, mitigation practices, hazardous materials identification, suppression options, and are introduced to the concept of size-up. Hands-on skills include using a fire extinguisher to suppress a live flame, and wearing basic protective gear. Firefighting standpipes as well as unconventional firefighting methods are also covered.
- Unit 3: Disaster medical operations part 1 (2.5 hrs). Students learn to identify and treat certain life-threatening conditions in a disaster setting, as well as START triage. Hands-on skills include performing head-tilt/chin-lift, practicing bleeding control techniques, and performing triage as an exercise.
- Unit 4: Disaster medical operations part 2 (2.5 hrs). Topics cover mass casualty operations, public health, assessing patients, and treating injuries. Students practice patient assessment, and various treatment techniques.
- Unit 5: Light search and rescue operations (2.5 hrs). Size-up is expanded as students learn about assessing structural damage, marking structures that have been searched, search techniques, as well as rescue techniques and cribbing. Hands-on activities include lifting and cribbing an object, and practicing rescue carries.
- Unit 6: CERT organization (1.5 hrs). Students are introduced to several concepts from the ICS, and local team organization and communication is explained. Hands-on skills include a table-top exercise focusing on incident command and control.
- Unit 7: Disaster psychology (1 hr). Responder well-being and dealing with victim trauma are the topics of this unit.
- Unit 8: Terrorism and CERT (2.5 hrs). Students learn how terrorists may choose targets, what weapons they may use, and identifying when chemical, biological, radiological, nuclear, or explosive weapons may have been deployed. Students learn about CERT roles in preparing for and responding to terrorist attacks. A table-top exercise highlights topics covered.
- Unit 9: Course review and disaster simulation (2.5 hrs). Students take a written exam, then participate in a real-time practical disaster simulation where the different skill areas are put to the test. A critique follows the exercise where students and instructors have an opportunity to learn from mistakes and highlight exemplary actions. Students may be given a certificate of completion at the conclusion of the course.

CERT training emphasizes safely "doing the most good for the most people as quickly as possible" when responding to a disaster. For this reason, cardiopulmonary resuscitation (CPR) training is not included in the core curriculum, as it is time- and responder-intensive in a mass-casualty incident. However, many jurisdictions encourage or require CERT members to obtain CPR training. New Castle County, Delaware, and the City of North Miami Beach, Florida; are two examples. Many CERT programs provide or encourage members to take additional first aid training.

Many CERT programs also provide training in amateur radio operation, shelter operations, flood response, community relations, mass care, the ICS, and the National Incident Management System (NIMS).

Each unit of CERT training is ideally delivered by professional responders or other experts in the field addressed by the unit. This is done to help build unity between CERT members and responders, keep the attention of students, and help the professional response organizations be comfortable with the training which CERT members receive.

Each course of instruction is ideally facilitated by one or more instructors certified in the CERT curriculum by the state or sponsoring agency. Facilitating instructors provide continuity between units, and help ensure that the CERT core curriculum is being delivered successfully. Facilitating instructors also perform set-up and tear-down of the classroom, provide instructional materials for the course, record student attendance and other tasks which assist the professional responder in delivering their unit as efficiently as possible.

CERT training is provided free to interested members of the community, and is delivered in a group classroom setting. People may complete the training without obligation to join a CERT. Citizen corps grant funds can be used to print and provide each student with a printed manual. Some sponsoring agencies use citizen corps grant funds to purchase disaster response tool kits. These kits are offered as an incentive to join a CERT, and must be returned to the sponsoring agency when members resign from CERT.

Some sponsoring agencies require a criminal background-check of all trainees before allowing them to participate on a CERT. For example, the city of Albuquerque, New Mexico, requires all volunteers to pass a background check, while the city of Austin, Texas, does not require a background check to take part in training classes, but requires members to undergo a background check in order to receive a CERT badge and directly assist first responders during an activation of the emergency operations center. However, most programs do not require a criminal background check in order to participate.

The CERT curriculum (including the "Train-the-Trainer" and program manager courses) was updated in 2019 to reflect feedback from instructors across the nation.

== FEMA Position Qualification System ==
In 2021 FEMA published Position Qualification System standards for CERT programs:

- FEMA CERT volunteer (Type 2/1)
- FEMA CERT section chief
- FEMA CERT team leader (Type 2/1)

Programs who choose to participate must have CERT members complete a position task book every 2 years:

- FEMA CERT volunteer type 2
- FEMA CERT volunteer type 1
- FEMA CERT section chief
- FEMA CERT team leader type 2
- FEMA CERT team leader type 1

== See also ==
- Disaster Preparedness and Response Team – a Pakistan-based non-governmental organization modeled after CERT.
- Local Emergency Planning Committee
- Medical Reserve Corps
