= Prepper (disambiguation) =

A prepper engages in survivalism, a movement who actively prepare for emergencies, including possible disruptions in social or political order.

Prepper may also refer to:

- Preppers (TV series), 2021 Australian TV series
- Preppers, the sports team of MMI Preparatory School, Freeland, Pennsylvania, U.S

== See also ==
- Prep (disambiguation)
- Preppie (disambiguation)
- Preparatory school (disambiguation)
- Everyday carry, a collection of useful items that are consistently carried on person every day
- Preppy or preppie, an American subculture associated with old private Northeastern college preparatory schools
- Doomsday Preppers, an American TV show
