= Preparation =

Preparation may refer to:

- Preparation (dental), readying a tooth for dental restoration
- Preparation (music), the consonant pitch or chord which precedes a dissonant nonharmonic tone
- Preparation, Iowa, a ghost town in the United States
- The Preparation, a 2017 South Korean film
- Preparations (album), by Prefuse 73, 2007

== See also ==
- Prep (disambiguation)
- Preparator (disambiguation)
- Prepare (disambiguation)
- Preparedness (disambiguation)
- Preparationism
- Preparation H, a brand of medications for hemorrhoids
- Praeparatio evangelica ('Preparation for the Gospel'), an early Christian book
- Preparation time, time to prepare speeches in policy debate
- Prepared piano, with objects on or between the strings
- Prepared guitar, with objects on or between the strings
- Fossil preparation
- Medication, or pharmaceutical preparation
  - Dosage form, a pharmaceutical drug product presented in a specific form for use
