= Preparedness Act =

Preparedness Act may refer to:

- Special Preparedness Fund Act of 1917 (U.S.)
- Pandemic Preparedness and Response Act (U.S.) of 2005
- Public Readiness and Emergency Preparedness Act (U.S.) of 2005
- Pandemic and All-Hazards Preparedness Act (U.S.) of 2006
- Pandemic and All-Hazards Preparedness Reauthorization Act of 2013 (U.S.)
- Pandemic and All-Hazards Preparedness and Advancing Innovation Act (U.S.) of 2019
- Coronavirus Preparedness and Response Supplemental Appropriations Act, 2020 (U.S.)

== See also ==
- Preparedness (disambiguation)
