= Emergency Planning and Community Right-to-Know Act =

1986 United States law

- Long title: Emergency Planning and Community Right-to-Know Act
- Acronyms (colloquial): EPCRA
- Enacted by: the 99th United States Congress
- Effective: October 17, 1986

Citations
- Public law: 99-499
- Statutes at Large: 100 Stat. 1728

Codification
- Acts amended: CERCLA
- Titles amended: 42
- U.S.C. sections created: 11001-11050

Legislative history
- Introduced in the House of Representatives as H.R.2005 by James R. Jones (D–OK) on April 4, 1985; Passed the House of Representatives on May 14, 1985 (413-0); Passed the Senate on September 26, 1985 (86-13); Reported by the joint conference committee on October 3, 1986; agreed to by the Senate on October 3, 1986 (88-8) and by the House of Representatives on October 8, 1986 (386-27); Signed into law by President Ronald Reagan on October 17, 1986

The Emergency Planning and Community Right-to-Know Act of 1986 is a United States federal law passed by the 99th United States Congress located at Title 42, Chapter 116 of the U.S. Code, concerned with emergency response preparedness.

A free-standing law, the Emergency Planning and Community Right-to-Know Act of 1986 (EPCRA) was commonly known as SARA Title III (SARA is short for Superfund Amendments and Reauthorization Act). Its purpose is to encourage and support emergency planning efforts at the state and local levels and to provide the public and local governments with information concerning potential chemical hazards present in their communities.

== Background ==
During the early morning hours of December 3, 1984, a Union Carbide plant in a village just South of Bhopal, India released approximately forty tons of Methyl Isocyanate (MIC) into the air. Used in the manufacture of pesticides, MIC is a lethal chemical. The gas quickly and silently diffused over the ground and, in the end, killed, by some estimates, upwards to 5,000 people and injured 500,000 more. The only other place in the world that Union Carbide manufactured MIC is at its Institute plant in the Kanawha Valley of West Virginia.

A week after the Bhopal accident, on December 11, 1984, Hank Karawan, then plant manager of the Union Carbide's Institute facility, held a press conference at which he expressed his confidence in the safety of the Institute plant's operations:

All of us here at the Institute plant have been deeply saddened by the tragic event in India and we extend our sympathy to all the people in the city of Bhopal. I am pleased to have the opportunity to make a point here this morning. Employees of the Institute plant have been manufacturing MIC in an effective and safe manner for seventeen years. We are extremely proud of that safety record. We are confident in the ability of our trained, dedicated, skilled, and experienced people. We are confident in the equipment that we operate, the safety precautions that we utilize, the monitoring systems that we have, and our plant emergency preparedness.

Despite Mr. Karawan's vote of confidence for the safety of the MIC operations at his plant, Union Carbide elected to shut down production of the deadly chemical until it could make $500 million worth of safety improvements. On May 4, 1985, Union Carbide resumed production of MIC. On August 11, 1985, on the heels of the completion of the safety improvement program just a few months before, 500 gallons of aldicarb oxime and highly toxic MIC leaked from the Institute plant. Although no one was killed, 134 people living around the plant were treated at local hospitals.

Both the Bhopal and the Institute incidents underscored the reality of modern-day chemical production—no matter what safety precautions are taken, no matter how well trained a plant's employees may be, and no matter how prepared a plant may be to handle an emergency situation, accidents may still occur. Indeed, around the time of the Bhopal disaster, 6,928 chemical accidents occurred in the United States within a five-year period. In response to this growing threat, the United States Congress passed the Emergency Planning and Community Right-to-Know Act (EPCRA) in 1986.

== Primary responsibilities ==
In November 1986, the United States Congress passed the Emergency Planning and Community Right-to-Know Act ("EPCRA" or "the Act") to help America's communities "deal safely and effectively with the many hazardous substances that are used throughout our society." The purpose of the Act is two-fold: (1) to encourage and support emergency planning for responding to chemical accidents; and (2) to provide local governments and the public with information about possible chemical hazards in their communities. To facilitate cooperation between industry, interested citizens, environmental and other public-interest organizations, and government at all levels, the Act establishes an ongoing "forum" at the local level called the Local Emergency Planning Committee (LEPC). LEPCs are governed by the State Emergency Response Commission (SERC) in each state.

Under the Emergency Planning and Community Right-to-Know Act, SERCs and LEPCs are charged with four primary responsibilities:

- Write emergency plans to protect the public from chemical accidents;
- Establish procedures to warn and, if necessary, evacuate the public in case of an emergency;
- Provide citizens and local governments with information about hazardous chemicals and accidental releases of chemicals in their communities; and
- Assist in the preparation of public reports on annual release of toxic chemicals into the air, water, and soil.

== EPCRA Reporting Requirements ==
EPCRA does not place limits on which chemicals can be stored, used, released, disposed, or transferred at a facility. It only requires a facility to document, notify, and report information. Each section of the law, however, applies different requirements, has different deadlines and covers a different group of chemicals.

== Emergency Planning (Sections 301–303, 42 U.S.C. §§ 11001-11003) ==
These sections are to ensure that state and local communities are prepared to respond to potential chemical accidents. As a first step, each state had to establish a State Emergency Response Commission (SERC). In turn, the SERC designated local emergency planning districts. For each district, the SERC appoints, supervises and coordinates the activities of a Local Emergency Planning Committee (LEPC). The LEPC must, in turn, develop an emergency response plan for its district and review it annually. The membership of the LEPC includes representatives of public and private organizations as well as a representative from every facility subject to EPCRA emergency planning requirements.

The plan developed by the LEPC must:

- identify affected facilities and transportation routes;
- describe emergency notification and response procedures;
- designate community and facility emergency coordinators;
- describe methods to determine the occurrence and extent of a release;
- identify available response equipment and personnel;
- outline evacuation plans;
- describe training and practice programs and schedules; and
- contain methods and schedules for exercising the plan.

Determining if a facility is subject to the EPCRA emergency planning requirements is straightforward. The Environmental Protection Agency (EPA) has published a list of "extremely hazardous substances (EHS)." For each EHS, the list includes the name, the Chemical Abstract Service number of the substance, and a number called a threshold planning quantity (TPQ). The TPQ, expressed in pounds, is the critical number. If a facility has within its boundaries an amount of an extremely hazardous substance equal to or in excess of its threshold planning quantity, the facility is subject to the EPCRA emergency planning requirements and must notify both the SERC and the LEPC of this fact. The facility must also appoint an emergency response coordinator who will work with the LEPC on developing and implementing the local emergency plan at the facility.

== Emergency Release Notification (Section 304, 42 U.S.C. § 11004) ==
A facility may be subject to these reporting requirements even if it is not subject to the provisions of Sections 301–303. This section applies to any facility which stores, produces or uses a "hazardous chemical" (any chemical which is a physical hazard or a health hazard) and releases a reportable quantity (RQ) of a substance contained in either of the following two tables published by the EPA in the Code of Federal Regulations:

- list of extremely hazardous substances; and
- list of CERCLA hazardous substances.

The RQ is the critical number that determines if a release must be reported. This is a number expressed in pounds that is assigned to each chemical in the above-mentioned tables. If the amount of a chemical released to the environment exceeds the reportable quantity, the facility must immediately report the release to the appropriate LEPC and SERC and provide a written follow-up as soon as practicable. Immediate notification must include the following:

- The name of the chemical;
- The location of the release;
- Whether the chemical is on the "extremely hazardous" list;
- How much of the substance has been released;
- The time and duration of the incident;
- Whether the chemical was released into the air, water, or soil, or some combination of the three;
- Known or anticipated health risks and necessary medical attention;
- Proper precautions, such as evacuation; and
- A contact person at the facility.

In addition to immediate notification, facilities are required to provide a follow-up report, in writing, "update(ing) the original notification, provid(ing) additional information on response actions taken, known or anticipated health risks, and, if appropriate, advice regarding any medical care needed by exposure victims." Failure to notify the proper authorities may result in civil penalties of up to $25,000 per day for each day of non-compliance and criminal penalties of up to $25,000 in fines and prison sentences of up to two years.

Of course there are exceptions. A release which results in exposure to persons solely within the facility boundary or is a federally permitted release does not have to be reported. Also, continuous pesticide and radionuclide releases meeting specified conditions are exempt.

== Community Right-to-Know Reporting Requirements (Sections 311–312, 42 U.S.C. §§ 11021-11022) ==
The purpose of these requirements is to increase community awareness of chemical hazards and to facilitate emergency planning. This section applies to any facility that is required by the Occupational Safety and Health Administration (OSHA) under its Hazard Communication Standard to prepare or have available a Safety Data Sheet (SDS) for a hazardous chemical (See II above for definition) or that has on-site, for any one day in a calendar year, an amount of a hazardous chemical equal to or greater than the following threshold limits established by the EPA:

- 10,000 pounds (4,500 kg) for hazardous chemicals; or
- lesser of 500 pounds (230 kg) or the threshold planning quantity (TPQ) for extremely hazardous substances.

If a facility is subject to reporting under these sections, it must submit information to the SERC, the LEPC and the local fire department with jurisdiction over the facility under two categories: SDS reporting and inventory reporting.

=== SDS Reporting ===
SDS reporting requirements specifically provide information to the local community about mixtures and chemicals present at a facility and their associated hazards. For all substances whose on-site quantities exceed the above threshold limits, the facility must submit the following:

- initially a copy of the SDS for each above-threshold chemical on-site or a list of the chemicals grouped into categories; and
- within three months of any change, an SDS or list for additional chemicals which meet the reporting criteria.

=== Inventory Reporting ===
Inventory reporting is designed to provide information on the amounts, location and storage conditions of hazardous chemicals and mixtures containing hazardous chemicals present at facilities. The inventory report has two forms. The Tier One form, the simpler of the two, contains aggregate information for applicable hazard categories and must be submitted yearly by March 1. The Tier One form is no longer accepted by any state. The Tier Two form contains more detailed information, including the specific names of each chemical. This form is submitted upon request of any of the agencies authorized to receive the Tier One form. It can also be submitted yearly in lieu of the Tier One Form.

== Toxic Chemical Release Inventory Reporting (Section 313, 42 U.S.C. § 11023) ==
Under this section, The EPA is required to establish the Toxics Release Inventory (TRI), an inventory of routine toxic chemical emissions from certain facilities. This inventory is intended to inform the public about releases of toxic chemicals. The data gathered is also intended to assist in research and development of regulations, guidelines, and standards. The original data requirements for the TRI, specified in SARA Title III, have been greatly expanded by the Pollution Prevention Act of 1990. The TRI must now also include information on source reduction, recycling and treatment.

To obtain this data, EPCRA requires each affected facility to submit a Toxic Chemical Release Inventory Form (Form R) to the EPA and designated state officials each year on July 1. A facility must file a Form R if it:

- has 10 or more full-time employees;
- is in a specified Standard Industrial Classification Code; and
- manufactures more than 25,000 lb/year of a listed toxic chemical; or
- processes more than 25,000 lb/year of a listed toxic chemical; or
- otherwise uses more than 10,000 lb/year of a listed toxic chemical; or
- manufactures, processes or otherwise uses a listed persistent bioaccumaltive toxic (PBT) chemical above the respective PBT's reporting threshold. PBT reporting thresholds can vary anywhere from 0.1 grams for dioxin compounds to 100 pounds (45 kg) for lead.

On October 29, 1999, EPA published a final rule (64 FR 58666) adding certain chemicals and chemical categories to the EPCRA section 313 list of toxic chemicals and lowering the reporting threshold for persistent bioaccumulative toxic (PBT) chemicals. On January 17, 2001 EPA published a final rule (66 FR 4500) that classified lead and lead compounds as PBT chemicals and lowered their reporting thresholds.

In December 2006, the EPA finalized a new TRI Rule which expands eligibility for use of the Form A Certification Statement in lieu of the more detailed Form R. Details about this final rule can be found on the EPA website under TRI Reporting.

== Federal Agency Responsibilities Under EPCRA ==
Since April 30, 1993, the United States Air Force, in accordance with AFR 355-1, "Disaster Preparedness, Planning and Operations," has voluntarily complied with Sections 303 and 304 of EPCRA in spite of the fact that federal facilities were initially exempt from its requirements. On August 3, 1993, President Clinton signed Executive Order 12856, "Federal Compliance With Right-to-Know Laws and Pollution Prevention Requirements." This Executive Order requires federal agencies, including the Department of Defense, to fully comply with all provisions of EPCRA and the Pollution Prevention Act with one notable exception: the reporting requirements under Section 313. Currently, a non-federal facility must file a Form R only if it is in a specified Standard Industrial Classification (SIC) Code. This exclusion does not apply to federal agencies. Federal agencies will comply with the provisions of Section 313 regardless of the SIC code that applies to their facilities.

== Lists of Chemicals (Sections 302 and 311–313, 42 U.S.C. §§ 11002 and 11021-11023) ==
The EPA's guide provides a useful description of the four groups of chemicals subject to reporting under the Emergency Planning and Community Right-to-Know Act:

- Extremely Hazardous Substances : This list currently contains more than 300 chemicals. Because of their extremely toxic properties, these chemicals were chosen to provide an initial focus for chemical emergency planning. If these chemicals are released in certain amounts, they may be of immediate concern to the community. Releases must be reported immediately.
- Hazardous Substances: These are hazardous substances listed under previous Superfund hazardous waste cleanup regulations (Section 103(a) of the Comprehensive Environmental Resource and Conservation Liability Act—Superfund). The current list contains about 720 substances. Releases of these chemicals above certain amounts must be reported immediately because they may represent an immediate hazard to the community.
- Hazardous Chemicals: These chemicals are not on a list at all, but are defined by Occupational Safety and Health Administration regulations as chemicals which represent a physical or health hazard. Under this definition many thousands of chemicals can be subject to reporting requirements if a facility manufactures, processes, or stores them in certain amounts. Inventories of these chemicals and material safety data sheets for each of them must be submitted if they are present in the facility in certain amounts.
- Toxic Chemicals: There are now more than 320 chemicals or chemical categories on this list, which were selected by Congress primarily because of their chronic or long-term toxicity. Estimates of releases of these chemicals into all media—air, land, and water—must be reported annually and entered into a national database.

== See also ==
- List of extremely hazardous substances
