= Preparator =

A preparator is a person who does preparation of some kind. The term may refer to:

- Art preparator
- Fossil preparator, one who prepares fossils for preservation
- Taxidermist
- Zoology preparator, one who prepares zoology specimen for museums
