= Prepare =

Prepare may refer to:

- PREPARE, the EU's Preparedness Against (Re-)emerging Epidemics
- Prepare, a strand of the UK's CONTEST counter-terrorism strategy
- Promoting Resilience and Efficiency in Preparing for Attacks and Responding to Emergencies (PREPARE) Act, a bill in the 115th United States Congress
- Prepare, a workflow stage for a prepared statement

== See also ==
- Prep (disambiguation)
- Preparation (disambiguation)
- Preparedness (disambiguation)
