= Disaster Preparedness and Response Team =

Pakistani NGO team (2005)

- Founded: 1 November 2005
- Founder: Asfandeyar Niazi
- Purpose: Search and Rescue; Community Emergency Response Team
- Website: dpart-sar.org Archived 2016-10-03 at the Wayback Machine

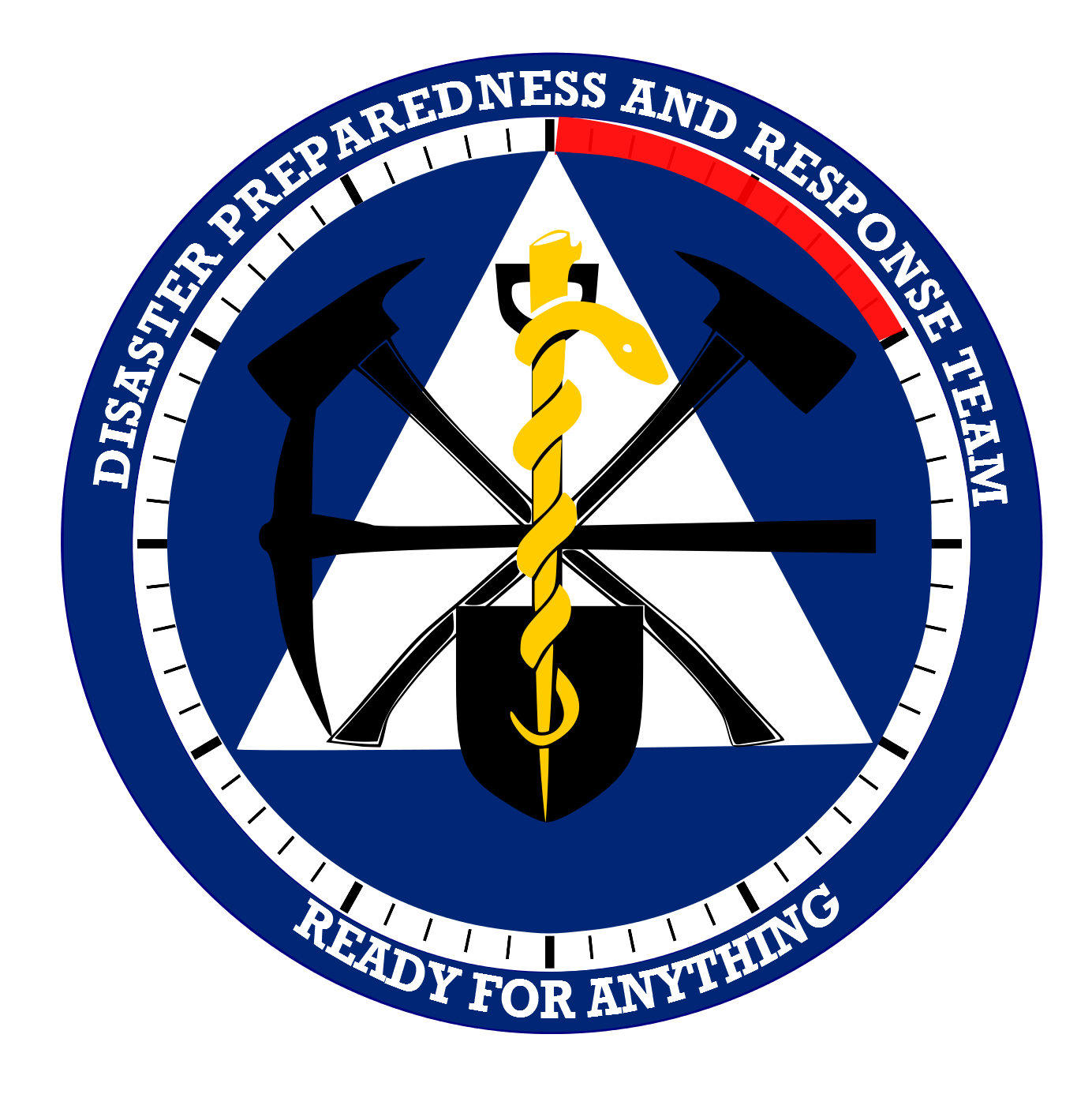
DPART Roundel Final Version

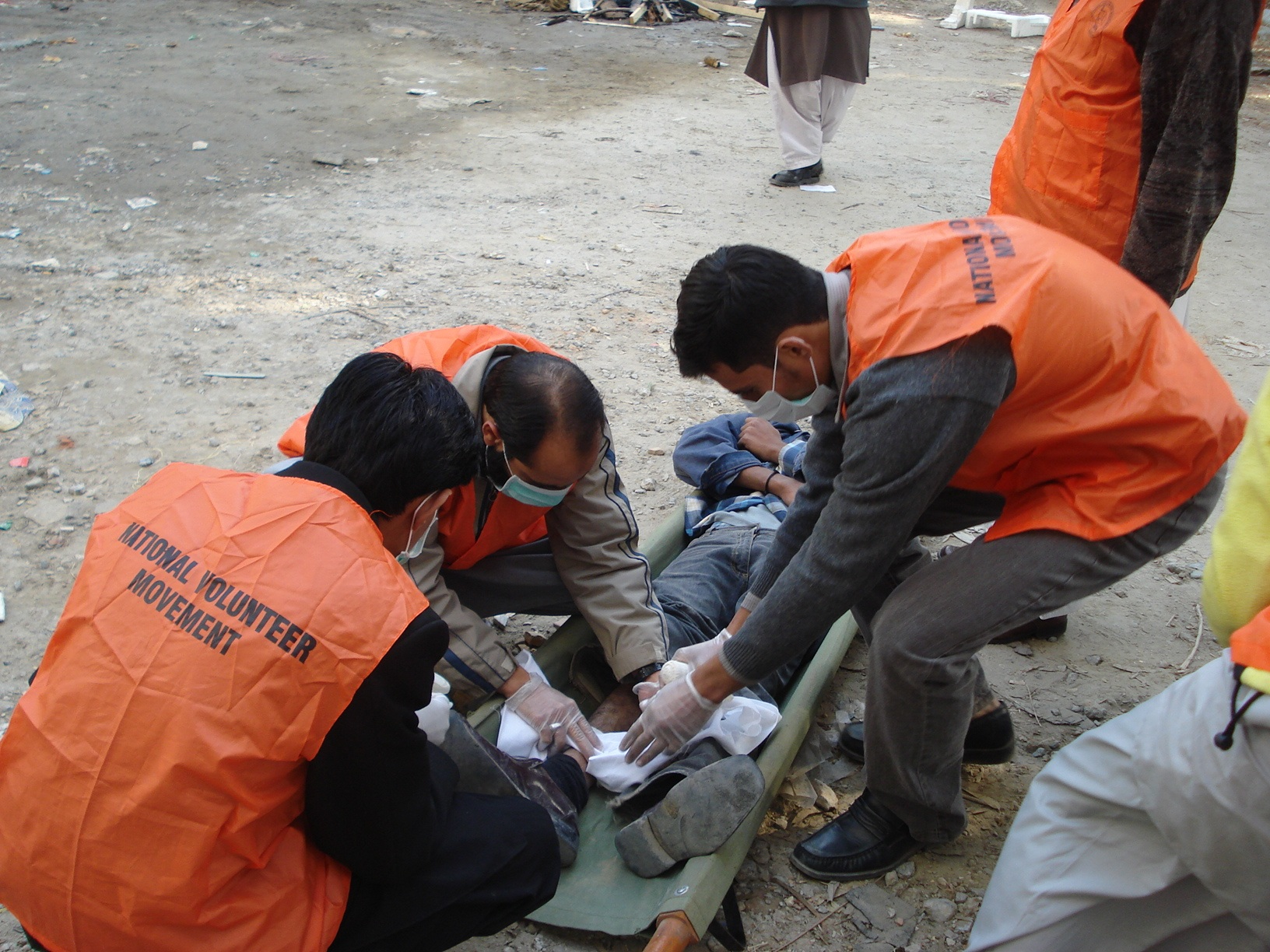
DPART SAR training members of NVM ERT in First Aid and casualty handling in Islamabad, Pakistan, 2007.

The Disaster Preparedness and Response Team is a non-governmental organisation (NGO) established in Pakistan in November 2005 following the Pakistan Quake. However it was not registered as a voluntary agency until 2006. It is composed of civilian volunteers who give some of their time to train and in major emergencies act as volunteer disaster workers.

The driving force behind DPART comes from the slow progress of the present Civil Defence in Pakistan and the lack of emphasis on community/citizen based emergency preparedness.

== History ==
In 2005, after the earthquake that struck Pakistan, work began on the DPART program. The goal of this new program was to better integrate and train community volunteers.

DPART SAR was uniquely modelled using the U.S. Federal Emergency Management Agency (FEMA) Community Emergency Response Team (CERT) as a template DPART was formed on similar principals. Since 2006, the program has been further developed to provide assistance at Mass Casualty Incidents and response to collapsed structures to eventually be supporting within the tape operations.

DPART SAR first went operational in 2006 Since that date the agency has provided assistance to several government agencies throughout the twin cities. DPART SAR provides both generalized services and specialized services. In the case of specialized services DPART SAR provides the following; Collapsed Structures Search and Rescue, Mass Casualty Incident Support, white water rescue operations, traffic control assistance, as well as providing services to evacuation centres.

== Training ==
DPART training is based on the FEMA CERT Training Manual and the Urban Search and Rescue [Category 1] training regimen, members are also trained in Disaster Preparedness, Fire Suppression, CPR+ Conducting Disaster Medical Operations, Psycho-Social Care “Disaster Psychology” via training partners and at the end of the 6 week training course students have a chance to practice and display their skills at a simulation session. Successful candidates receive the Basic Certificate and will either be assigned to a local team or asked to start a local team where one does not exist.

== DPART structure ==
At present DPART SAR has focused work on three distinct divisions, these are North, Central and South, North I and II are fully functional and consist of CFR: Community First responders, Community Training Team, Support section and Search and Rescue Training section.

South CFR team is currently operational and is enhancing its CFR team abilities, it is envisaged that south will mirror north in establishing a community training team an Emergency Support and Search and Rescue Section.

Central is presently under development, an officer has been assigned to the division and we plan that Central Division should start CFR scheme by Q2 2009.

== Logistics and equipment ==
Being a voluntary organization finances are low however DPART maintains a cache of equipment and tools logistical support is provided by team members.

== Continuing support for members ==
After qualifying members are provided ID cards & uniform however they have to pay for the cost of their personal responder (kit). Qualifying members are offered the option to progress throughout their voluntary careers with DPART as Team Leaders, Instructors or component specialists.

Members can also gain certifications in Incident Command Systems, Hazmat Awareness, Medical First Responder and Shelter/Camp Management.

DPART works hard to partner with emergency services and highlight the important role that properly trained, deployed and managed volunteers can make to a rescue or relief effort, where physical interaction is deemed to dangerous DPART volunteers can provide psycho-social care “stress debrief”, establish/assist in treatment camps or manage spontaneous volunteers.

=== Responding to disasters and emergencies ===
Since 2005 DPART SAR has responded to the following disasters and emergencies:

2005:

- Margalla Towers Collapse – Islamabad (USAR)

2006:

- Rawalpindi Building Collapse (USAR)
- Mass Casualty Call – Sector I 10, Islamabad (Explosive Incident)
- Road Traffic Collision – Bank Road, Saddar
- Road Traffic Collision – Murree Road, Rawalpindi
- Road Traffic Collision – Islamabad/Rawalpindi Highway
- Nala Lai Flooding – Rawalpindi (Evacuation)

2007:

- Mass Casualty Call- Islamabad (Explosive Incident)
- Road Traffic Collision – Chaklala Scheme 3, Rawalpindi
- Trauma Call (Community First Response) – Fall from height: Gulzar-e-Quaid, Rawalpindi
- Road Traffic Collision – Sector F7, Islamabad
- Fire “commercial complex” – Chaklala Scheme 3, Rawalpindi
- Road Traffic Collision – Sector G9, Islamabad

2008:

- Building Collapse – Ganj Mandi Rawalpindi (USAR)
- Road Traffic Collision – Tulsa Road, Lalazar, Rawalpindi
- Mass Casualty Incident – Mall Road, Rawalpindi (Explosive Incident)
- Ghakar Plaza Fire/Collapse – Bank Road, Saddar, Rawalpindi. (USAR)

=== Helping partners ===
In 2007-2008 DPART ran a number of workshops for community partners on various issues including first aid and risk management.

Since 2006 DPART has forged working partnerships with the following organisations:

- National Volunteer Movement of Pakistan
- Association of Volunteer Emergency Response Teams International
- Disaster Preparedness And Emergency Response Association
- Pakistan Red Crescent Society
- Civil Defence Pakistan
- Rescue 1122 Pakistan
- Wilderness Pakistan
- Rescue 15 Police Bahawalpur
