= Center for Domestic Preparedness =

Coordinates: 33.7301°N 85.7919°W

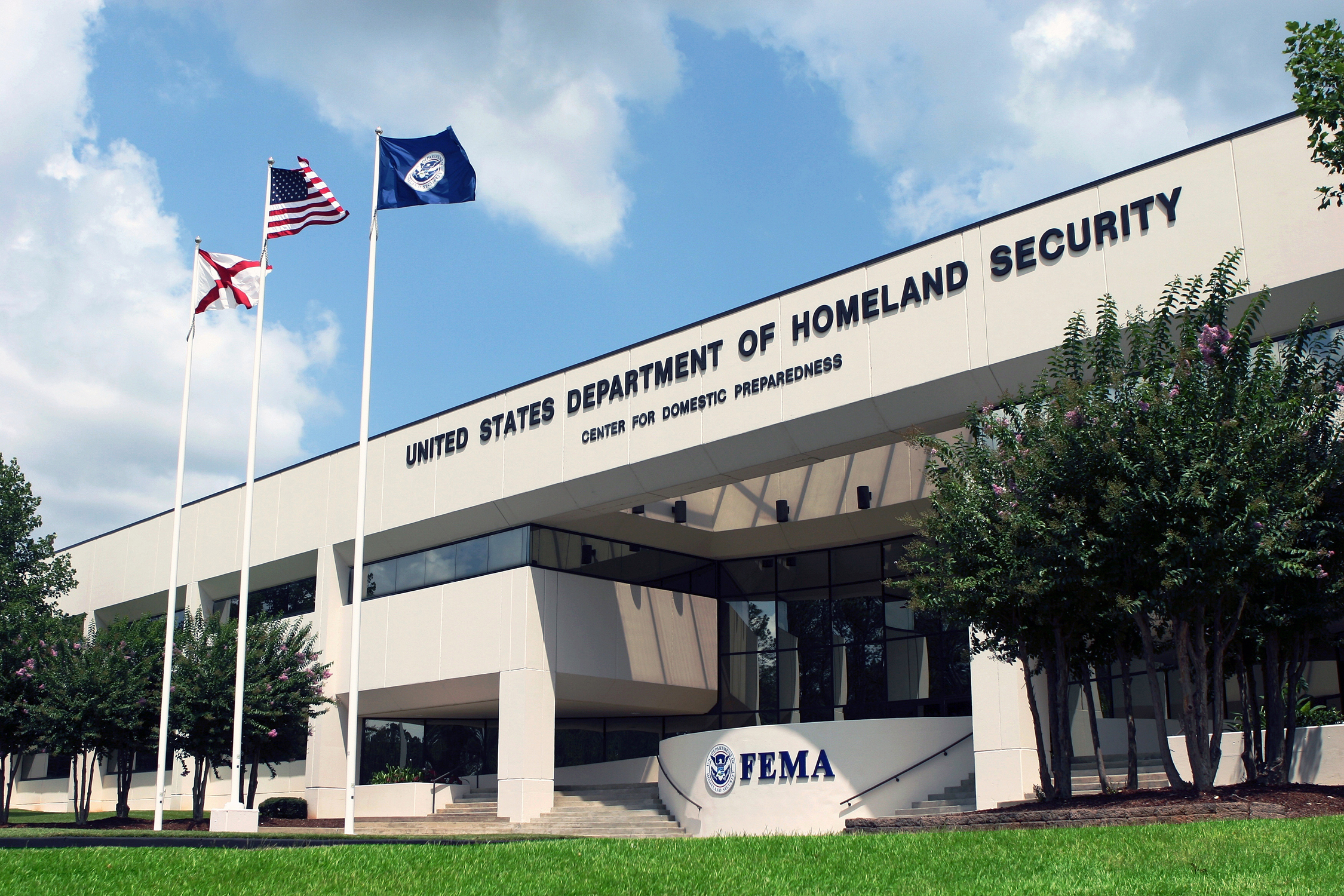
Center for Domestic Preparedness

The Center for Domestic Preparedness (CDP) is the only U.S. federal facility chartered to provide comprehensive preparedness training programs to the nation's emergency response providers. The facility, located in Calhoun County, Alabama, provides all-hazards training to approximately 50,000 emergency responders annually, or a total of 1.1 million responders since its inception in 1998. Trainees hail from state, local, tribal, territorial, and federal governments, as well as private entities. Training for state, local, tribal, and territorial governments are entirely funded by the United States Department of Homeland Security (DHS), whereas responders for foreign federal governments and private entities may be trained on a fee-for-service basis.

== Mission ==
According to their official website, the mission of the CDP is to identify, develop, test and deliver training to state, local and tribal emergency response providers; provide on-site and mobile training at the performance, management and planning levels; and facilitate the delivery of training by the training partners of the U.S. Department of Homeland Security.

== History ==
The United States Army Chemical School provided training to U.S. military forces to prepare and respond to chemical agent exposure and attacks. Although the chemical school was established in 1951, it became a permanent fixture at Fort McClellan from 1979 to the late 1990s.

Fort McClellan was identified for closure by the 1995 Base Realignment and Closure Commission. In 1998, the plan to establish a federally operated site to train civilian emergency responders was put into motion using facilities already in place at Fort McClellan. This training facility would be called the Center for Domestic Preparedness (CDP).

The conception of the CDP can be traced back to the 1995 Sarin gas attack on the Tokyo subway. As that event unfolded, public safety officials in New York City sought ways to prevent such an event in their city. These officials asked the Department of Defense for permission to allow civilian responders to train at Fort McClellan's Chemical Defense Training Facility. Defense officials granted access to toxic agent training at the U.S. Army Chemical School. The first class of civilian emergency responders graduated in late 1995, and civilian responders continued to train at the Army facility until 1998 as Fort McClellan continued its closure transition.

Elected officials from across Alabama and local community leaders continued to seek ways to utilize the soon-to-be-abandoned Army facility. A concept was developed and presented to members of Congress, who recognized the national benefit of having a facility dedicated to training civilian emergency responders under federal government management.

The CDP was originally established under the management of United States Department of Justice. In April 1998, the Department of Justice held an emergency responder stakeholders conference regarding Weapon of mass destruction training. Responders from across the nation identified the CDP's toxic chemical agent training scenarios as training that would benefit both immediate and long-term training needs.

In June 1998, the CDP opened its doors as a training center for the nation's emergency response providers. In addition, the Department of Justice invited the CDP to become a member of the National Domestic Preparedness Consortium.

The National Domestic Preparedness Consortium originally comprised the CDP; the New Mexico Institute of Mining and Technology (National Energetic Materials Research and Testing Center); Louisiana State University (Academy of Counter-Terrorist Education); Texas A&M University (National Emergency Response and Rescue Training Center); and the U.S. Department of Energy's Nevada Test Site (National Exercise, Test, and Training Center).

In accordance with the Improving America's Security Act of 2007, the Transportation Technology Center Inc. (Colorado); and the University of Hawaii Center of Excellence for Natural Disaster Preparedness Training (Hawaii) joined the National Domestic Preparedness Consortium.

In 2003, the CDP was transferred to the United States Department of Homeland Security (DHS); and in 2007, to the Federal Emergency Management Agency (FEMA).

On March 31, 2007, the Noble Training Facility was integrated into the CDP training center. The former Noble Army Hospital was converted into a training site for health and medical education in disasters, to include both acts of terrorism and man-made disasters. The Noble Training Facility is the only hospital facility in the United States that trains hospital and healthcare workers in disaster preparedness and response.

In 2014, the CDP purchased additional real property at the cost of $3.5 million, raising the total footprint of the CDP campus to 176 acres.

=== Covid-19 quarantine plans ===
The Health and Human Services planned to use the facility's dorms to quarantine patients with COVID-19, especially those coming from Japan via Caliburn International, a government contractor. On February 23, 2020, Darcie Johnston and Kevin Yeskey from HHS discussed these plans with locals from Anniston. After opposition from locals and Republican Representative Mike D. Rogers, Rogers and Republican Senator Richard C. Shelby announced that President Trump had canceled plans to use CDP.

== Activities ==
The training center provides responders with knowledge to plan for, prevent, protect, respond to, and recover from chemical, biological, explosive, radiological, or other hazardous materials incidents.

While each of the members of the National Domestic Preparedness Consortium provides specific training and education to emergency responders in a variety of weapons of mass destruction and hazardous materials subjects, the CDP trains emergency responders in 17 diverse responder disciplines: Emergency Management, Emergency Medical Services, Fire Service, Governmental Administrative, Hazardous Materials, Healthcare, Law Enforcement, Public Health, Public Safety Communications, Public Works, Agriculture, Education, Citizen/Community Volunteer, Information Technology, Security and Safety, Search and Rescue, and Transportation.

By October 2001, 2,400 emergency responders had participated in CDP training programs; that number would increase to more than 10,000 the following year, in the wake of the September 11th attacks on the World Trade Center.

One component of the CDP training program is the toxic agent Chemical, Ordnance, Biological, and Radiological Training Facility (COBRATF). The COBRATF features civilian training exercises in a genuine toxic environment, using the chemical agents Sarin (GB) and VX. These toxins are typically referred to as nerve agents and are included in the United Nations Chemical Weapons Convention which allows for use in defensive training in a controlled environment. The Army Institute of Research says the use of genuine nerve agents promotes confidence, the advanced hands-on training enables responders to effectively prevent, respond to, and recover from real-world incidents involving acts of terrorism and other hazardous materials. In 2012, biological materials were added to the toxic agent training.

Part of the CDP campus, the Advance Responder Training Complex offers a cross-section of environments found in any community throughout the nation, providing responders with a realistic training environment to exercise the skills acquired during training. The complex includes a remodeled industrial park complex with simulated office space, medical clinic, fast food restaurant, facility, maintenance, biomedical laboratory, calibration laboratory, shipping/receiving office, subway rail system and indoor street scene.

Responders from all fifty states, the District of Columbia, and all U.S. territories have trained at the CDP. Numerous federal and non-federal training partnerships enable the CDP staff to share knowledge, to ensure the nation's responders receive the most up-to-date training. The CDP offers 50 courses that offer emergency responders a wide range of training. All courses are available as resident training and select courses completed through non-resident programs to include mobile training units.

== See also ==
United States Department of Homeland Security
