= National Domestic Preparedness Consortium =

ColLABorative CommUNITY enabling local disaster preparedness

The National Domestic Preparedness Consortium (NDPC) is a training partner and established training arm of the U.S. Department of Homeland Security DHS/FEMA. It is a professional alliance of seven national institutions and organizations that work to develop and deliver training, technical assistance, plan assessments, and exercises to emergency responders and first receivers at the territories, state, local and tribal levels. The members were chosen for their unique knowledge bases in the areas of chemical, biological, radiological, nuclear, explosive, medical, critical infrastructure, and incident management, and have enhanced their core competencies at the request of DHS and FEMA to include other areas as well. The following is a list of the NDPC members and their core competencies:

• Center for Domestic Preparedness (CDP) Center for Domestic Preparedness – prevention, deterrence, and response to CBRNE hazards and healthcare/public health mass casualty.

• National Center for Biomedical Research and Training (NCBRT) at Louisiana State University – biological, law enforcement, and agroterrorism prevention, deterrence, and response.

• National Nuclear Security Administration NNSA/CTOS-Center for Radiological/Nuclear Training at the Nevada National Security Site – prevention, deterrence, and response to radiological/nuclear incidents.

• Energetic Materials Research and Testing Center at New Mexico Tech University EMRTC - explosive and incendiary attacks.

• Texas A&M Engineering Extension Service, National Emergency Response and Recovery Training Center TEEX – cyber security, crisis communications, executive and elected officials education, hazardous materials awareness and operations, health and medical services, incident management, infrastructure protection, search and rescue, threat and risk assessment, and training gap analysis.

• National Disaster Preparedness Training Center at University of Hawaii - National Disaster Preparedness Training Center (NDPTC) - natural disasters, coastal communities, islands and territories and underserved at-risk populations.

• Transportation Technology Center, Inc.TTCI – rail and surface transportation safety, integrity and security research and testing, security and emergency response in surface transportation.

These seven organizations develop and deliver courses and provide instructor development. Courses are certified by the U.S. Department of Homeland Security and instructors are certified by the NDPC.

The target audience for NDPC courses is the ten emergency response training disciplines currently delineated by DHS/ FEMA: emergency management agency, emergency medical services, fire service, governmental administrative, hazardous material, health care, law enforcement, public health, public safety communications, and public works.

Background

The NDPC was originally established by a Congressional Mandate in 1998, and funding for the NDPC is authorized by and appropriated annually through the Homeland Security National Training Program. Each year, all non-federal members submit a scope of work statement to DHS/FEMA for the program activities delineated in annual budgets.

The NDPC has conducted training in all 50 states and each U.S. territory. More than 2,800,000 people have been trained by NDPC since 1998. The consortium’s various programs meet the training and education needs of more than 60,000 emergency responders and state, local, and tribal government employees.

Mission

The mission of the NDPC is to enhance the preparedness of territories, state, local, and tribal emergency responders/first receivers and teams, including non-governmental organizations and the private sector, to reduce the Nation’s vulnerability to incidents involving weapons of mass destruction, terrorism, all-hazard high-consequence events by developing, delivering, and assessing plans, training, technical assistance, and exercises.

External links

Official website

Center for Domestic Preparedness (CDP)

National Center for Biomedical Research and Training (NCBRT)

National Nuclear Security Administration/CTOS-Center for Radiological/Nuclear Training at the Nevada National Security Site

Energetic Materials Research and Testing Center

Texas A&M Engineering Extension Service, National Emergency Response and Recovery Training Center

National Disaster Preparedness Training Center at University of Hawaii

Transportation Technology Center, Inc.
