= Prep =

Prep is a short form of "preparedness" or preparation.

Prep may also refer to:

== Education ==
- College-preparatory school or prep school, US, a type of secondary school
  - Preppy or preppie or prep, a US subculture associated with prep schools
- Preparatory school (United Kingdom) or prep school, a type of primary school
- Test preparation or test prep
- Educational stage where you begin primary school, referred to as prep in parts of Australia.

== Science ==
- PREP, gene encoding prolyl endopeptidase
- PrEP, Pre-exposure prophylaxis, disease-protective drug therapy
  - specifically, and now more commonly, the special case of pre-exposure prophylaxis for HIV prevention, better known as PrEP

== Other uses ==
- PREP Act or PREPA (Public Readiness and Emergency Preparedness Act), a US law that provides for immunity to liability for medicine manufacturers during a public-health emergency.
- Prep (band), an English indie pop band
- Prep, a novel by Curtis Sittenfeld
- P-rep, probability of replicating an effect
- PReP, the PowerPC Reference Platform
- Prep Edu, a language learning, teaching, and testing platform

== See also ==
- Prep for Prep, a leadership program in the Bronx
- Prepper (disambiguation)
- Preppie (disambiguation)
- Prepare (disambiguation)
- Preparation (disambiguation)
- Preparedness (disambiguation)
