= Preppie (disambiguation) =

Preppy or preppie, is an American subculture associated with private university-preparatory schools.

Preppy, preppie, or preppies may also refer to:

- Preppie (album), by American R&B artist Cheryl Lynn
- Preppie! (video game), for Atari 8-bit computers
- Preppies (film), a 1984 comedy

== See also ==
- Prepper (disambiguation)
- Prep (disambiguation)
