= Local Emergency Planning Committee =

Local Emergency Planning Committees (LEPCs) are community-based organizations that assist in preparing for emergencies, particularly those concerning hazardous materials. Under the Emergency Planning and Community Right-to-Know Act (EPCRA), Local Emergency Planning Committees (LEPCs) must develop an emergency response plan, review the plan at least annually, and provide information about hazardous materials in the community to citizens. Plans are developed by LEPCs with stakeholder participation. The LEPC membership must include (at a minimum):

- Elected state and local officials
- Police, fire service, civil defense, and public health professionals
- Environment, transportation, and hospital officials
- Facility representatives
- Representatives from community groups and the media

Some required elements of the community emergency response plan, developed by the LEPC, include:

- Identification of facilities and transportation routes of extremely hazardous substances
- Description of emergency response procedures, on and off site
- Designation of a community coordinator and facility emergency coordinator(s) to implement the plan
- Outline of emergency notification procedures
- Description of how to determine the probable affected area and population by releases
- Description of local emergency equipment and facilities and the persons responsible for them
- Outline of evacuation plans
- A training program for emergency responders (including schedules)
- Methods and schedules for exercising emergency response plans

Though LEPCs were created with the Federal law EPCRA, through the U.S. Environmental Protection Agency, they are often funded partially by the U.S. Department of Transportation's Hazardous Materials Emergency Preparedness grant program. Other sources of funding may include local jurisdictions, industry, businesses, NGOs, and other public or private grants.
