= Red River Compact Commission =

Member states of the Red River Compact Commission

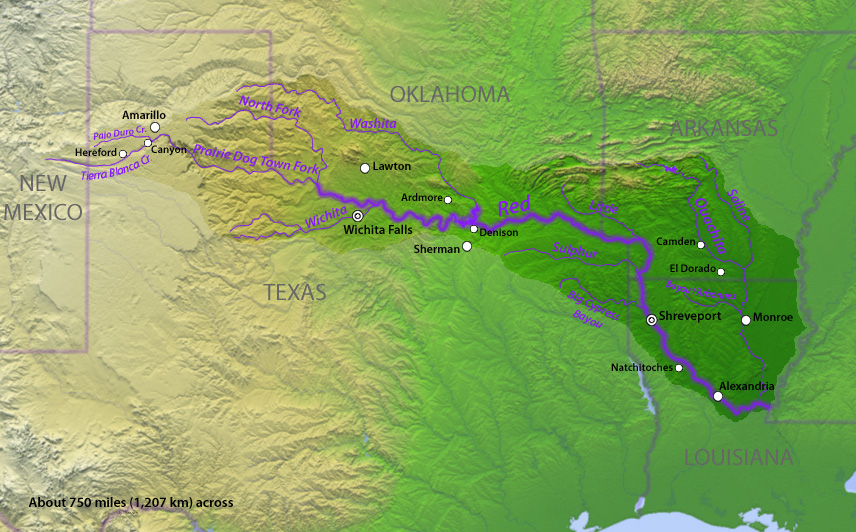
Red River watershed

The Red River Compact was signed by the states of Arkansas, Louisiana, Oklahoma and Texas to avoid disputes over the waters of the Red River in 1978, although Congress had authorized the compact in 1955. The Red River Compact Commission has nine commissioners, two from each member state and one federal representative appointed by the President of the United States.

Although the Red River Compact sets limits on how much water each state can use or store from the Red River Basin, the Commission serves as a forum for resolving issues and has reduced the likelihood of litigation. In recent years, the Commission has addressed problems of water quality and pollution, as well as questions of quantity.

== See also ==
- Title 18 of the Code of Federal Regulations
- Colorado River Compact
- Columbia River Gorge Commission
- Connecticut River Valley Flood Control Commission
- Delaware River Basin Commission
- Interstate Commission on the Potomac River Basin
- Susquehanna River Basin Commission
- Tarrant Regional Water Dist. v. Herrmann
