= Interstate compact =

Formal agreement between two or more U.S. states

In the United States, an interstate compact is a legally binding pact or agreement between two or more states, or between states and any foreign sub-national government. Common reasons for creating interstate compacts include resolving boundary disputes, cooperative management of infrastructure, and reducing administrative barriers. Interstate compacts are subject to congressional regulation. The history of interstate compacts ranges from treaties that predate the Constitution to the present day.

== Description ==
Most early interstate compacts resolved boundary disputes, but since the early 20th century, compacts have increasingly been used as tools of state cooperation and mutual recognition for infrastructure, services, and professional licensing, often to ease administrative barriers and reduce costs and litigation. In some cases, an agreement will create a new multistate governmental agency responsible for administering or improving a shared resource, such as a seaport or public transportation infrastructure. Compacts may also be limited to a specific multistate region, open to all states and insular areas, or open to subnational governments in other countries.

Interstate compacts are considered to be legally binding contracts, and states can be compelled to comply with their terms by Congress and the courts. Even if the compact is not enacted by statute, it has the force of statutory law, superseding state law when there is a conflict.

Interstate compacts are distinct from, but may involve aspects of, the following:

- Model acts, which are proposed statutes produced by non-governmental bodies of legal experts to be passed by state legislatures independently, rather than constituting an agreement among multiple states;
- executive agreements between governors or statewide executive officers of states, which may or may not have the backing of statute or state constitutional law;
- State-level trigger laws which provide for an automatic action if one or more states, or the federal government, perform a specified action; or
- State-level laws mandating, permitting, or prohibiting state cooperation with another state government or the federal government regarding certain actions.

=== Interstate agencies ===
Several interstate compacts may establish multistate agencies to coordinate policy among member states or to perform tasks on behalf of member states. Such agencies may take the form of commissions, with at least one representative from a member state with a voting role in the commission. Alternatively, member states to a compact may opt for cooperation with a single independent non-profit organization that carries out designated tasks without government funding. Actions or rule changes taken by commissions or non-profits may require ratification by the member states to take effect, depending on whether they alter the terms of the compact.

== Legal background ==
The Compact Clause (Article I, Section 10, Clause 3) of the United States Constitution provides that "No State shall, without the Consent of Congress,... enter into any Agreement or Compact with another State, or with a foreign Power,... unless actually invaded, or in such imminent Danger as will not admit of delay."

In 2025, the states of California, Washington, and Oregon entered into a compact, forming the West Coast Health Alliance, in response to an emergent degradation of the "U.S. Centers for Disease Control and Prevention's (CDC) credibility and scientific integrity."

However, in a report released in October 2019 about the proposed National Popular Vote Interstate Compact, the Congressional Research Service (CRS) cited the U.S. Supreme Court's ruling in Virginia v. Tennessee (1893)—reaffirmed in U.S. Steel Corp. v. Multistate Tax Commission (1978) and Cuyler v. Adams (1981)—that ruled that explicit congressional consent of interstate compacts is not required for agreements "which the United States can have no possible objection or have any interest in interfering with" (in addition to ruling that the words "agreement" and "compact" used in the Compact Clause are synonyms). Instead, the Court required explicit congressional consent for interstate compacts that are "directed to the formation of any combination tending to the increase of political power in the States, which may encroach upon or interfere with the just supremacy of the United States"—meaning where the vertical balance of power between the federal government and state governments is altered in favor of state governments. While the report references U.S. Steel Corp. v. Multistate Tax Commission as stating that the "pertinent inquiry [with respect to the Compact Clause] is one of potential, rather than actual, impact on federal supremacy" in noting that the potential erosion of an enumerated power of the United States Congress by an interstate compact can arguably require explicit congressional approval. The CRS report cites the Supreme Court's rulings in Florida v. Georgia (1855) and in Texas v. New Mexico and Colorado (2018) as recognizing that explicit congressional consent is also required for interstate compacts that alter the horizontal balance of power amongst state governments.

Citing Metropolitan Washington Airports Authority v. Citizens for Abatement of Aircraft Noise, Inc. (1991) as stating that if an enumerated power under the Constitution is legislative, then "Congress must exercise it in conformity with the bicameralism and presentment requirements of Article I, Section VII", and noting that the Republican River Compact was initially vetoed by President Franklin D. Roosevelt in 1942, the CRS report states that if an interstate compact requires explicit congressional approval, it must be approved by both houses of Congress and signed into law by the President to become law. In Cuyler v. Adams, the Court held that congressional approval of interstate compacts makes them federal laws. The CRS report cites the Court's opinions in Virginia v. Tennessee and Northeast Bancorp v. Federal Reserve Board of Governors (1985) as stating that any agreement between two or more states that "cover[s] all stipulations affecting the conduct or claims of the parties", prohibits members from "modify[ing] or repeal[ing] [the agreement] unilaterally", and requires "'reciprocation' of mutual obligations" constitutes an interstate compact. Additionally, the CRS report cites the Court's opinion in Northeast Bancorp as suggesting that a requirement of a new interstate governmental entity is a sufficient condition for an agreement to qualify as being an interstate compact under the Compact Clause. The CRS report stated that there were approximately 200 interstate compacts in effect in 2019.

The Constitution does not specify the timing of Congressional consent so that that consent may be given either before or after the states have agreed to a particular compact. Consent may be explicit, but it may also be inferred from the circumstances. Congress may also impose conditions as part of its approval of a compact. Congress must explicitly approve any compact that would give a state power that is otherwise designated to the federal government.

== History ==
Treaties between the states, ratified under the Articles of Confederation during the period after American independence in 1776 until the current U.S. Constitution was ratified in 1789, are grandfathered and treated as interstate compacts. This includes agreements such as the Treaty of Beaufort, which set the boundary between Georgia and South Carolina in 1787 and remains in effect.

Before 1922, most interstate compacts were either border agreements between states or advisory compacts, the latter of which were tasked with conducting joint studies and reporting back to the respective state legislatures. With the creation of the Port Authority of New York and New Jersey in 1922, administrative compacts began to develop as a third, more empowered type of interstate compact, in which member states task persistent governance structures with providing designated services.

Focusing precisely on the 1920s when there was considerable enthusiasm for interstate compacting--and drawing parallels between the legal and political culture of the 1920s and today--scholars Jon D. Michaels and Emme Tyler invite today's governors and state legislators to rediscover and re-deploy interstate compacts and agreements, this time to meet the challenges of modern public administration. Michaels and Aziz Huq, reacting to the Trump administration's abdication of federal regulatory and social-service responsibilities, have similarly encouraged more aggressive experimentation with compacts and agreements, urging groups of like-minded states to "set up interstate academic programs that pool students and faculty cut off from federal funds into large regional research consortia; re-create public-health and meteorology forecasting centers servicing member states; and finance pandemic planning and countermeasures, precisely what was lacking--and sorely needed--early in the COVID-19 crisis."

Today, Virginia is a member of the most interstate compacts at 40, while Hawaii is a member of the fewest at 15.

== List of operating agencies created by interstate compact ==
=== Borders and land/water administration ===
- Atlantic States Marine Fisheries Commission (Maine, New Hampshire, Massachusetts, Rhode Island, Connecticut, New York, New Jersey, Pennsylvania, Delaware, Maryland, Virginia, North Carolina, South Carolina, Georgia, and Florida)
- Bear River Commission (Idaho, Utah, and Wyoming)
- Breaks Interstate Park Commission (Kentucky and Virginia)
- Colorado River Compact (Colorado, New Mexico, Utah, Wyoming, Nevada, Arizona, and California)
- Columbia River Gorge Commission (Oregon and Washington)
- Connecticut River Valley Flood Control Commission (Connecticut, Massachusetts, New Hampshire, and Vermont)
- Delaware River Basin Commission (Pennsylvania, Delaware, New Jersey, and New York)
- Delaware River Port Authority (Pennsylvania and New Jersey)
- Delaware River and Bay Authority (Delaware and New Jersey)
- Great Lakes Commission (Illinois, Indiana, Michigan, Minnesota, New York, Ohio, Pennsylvania, and Wisconsin, plus Canadian provinces of Ontario and Quebec as associate members)
- Gulf States Marine Fisheries Commission (Alabama, Florida, Louisiana, Mississippi, and Texas)
- Interstate Commission on the Potomac River Basin (Maryland, West Virginia, Virginia, Pennsylvania, and District of Columbia)
- Interstate Environmental Commission (Connecticut, New Jersey and New York)
- Interstate Wildlife Violator Compact (all states)
- NEIWPCC (originally called the New England Interstate Water Pollution Control Commission) (Connecticut, Maine, Massachusetts, New Hampshire, New York, Rhode Island, Vermont)
- Pacific States Marine Fisheries Commission (California, Oregon, Washington, Idaho, and Alaska)
- Palisades Interstate Park Commission (New York and New Jersey)
- Red River Compact Commission (Arkansas, Louisiana, Oklahoma and Texas)
- Susquehanna River Basin Commission (Pennsylvania, New York, and Maryland)
- Tahoe Regional Planning Agency (California and Nevada)
- Interstate Mining Compact (24 states)

=== Transportation ===
- Bi-State Development Agency (Missouri and Illinois)
- Washington Metropolitan Area Transit Authority (Maryland, Virginia, and Washington, D.C.)
- Washington Metropolitan Area Transit Commission (Maryland, Virginia, and Washington, D.C.)
- Kansas City Area Transportation Authority (Kansas and Missouri)
- Midwest Interstate Passenger Rail Commission (Illinois, Indiana, Kansas, Michigan, Minnesota, Missouri, Nebraska, North Dakota, Wisconsin)
- Port Authority of New York and New Jersey (New Jersey and New York)
- Virginia-North Carolina High Speed Rail Compact (North Carolina and Virginia)
- Delaware River Joint Toll Bridge Commission (Pennsylvania and New Jersey)

=== Health and emergency ===
- Nurse Licensure Compact (43 states)
- Compact on Mental Health (45 states)
- Recognition of EMS Personnel Licensure Interstate CompAct (REPLICA, or EMS Compact; 20 states)
- Western States Pact (California, Colorado, Nevada, Oregon, Washington)
- Eastern States Multistate Council (New York, New Jersey, Pennsylvania, Massachusetts, Rhode Island, Connecticut, Delaware)
- Midwest Governors Regional Pact (Illinois, Indiana, Kentucky, Michigan, Minnesota, Ohio, Wisconsin)
- Emergency Management Assistance Compact (all states, plus Washington, D.C., Puerto Rico, U.S. Virgin Islands, and Guam)
- Health Care Compact
- Interstate Civil Defense and Disaster Compact
- Social Work Licensure Compact (Alabama, Connecticut, Georgia, Iowa, Kansas, Kentucky, Maine, Missouri, Nebraska, Ohio, South Dakota, Utah, Vermont, Virginia, Washington)
- West Coast Health Alliance (California, Oregon, Washington, Hawaii)
- Advanced Practice Registered Nurse Compact (Delaware, North Dakota, South Dakota, Utah)
- Northeastern Forest Fire Protection Compact (Connecticut, Maine, Massachusetts, New Hampshire, New York, Rhode Island, Vermont)
- Physical Therapy Compact (PT License; 30 states)
- Psychological Interjurisdictional Compact (PSYPACT; 40 states, including Northern Mariana Islands and D.C.)
- Interstate Medical Licensure Compact (IMLC; 32 states and Guam)
- Audiology and Speech-Language Pathology Compact (ALSPCompact; 32 states)
- Occupational Therapy Compact (OT Compact; 30 states)
- Counseling Compact (36 states)

=== Economic development ===
- Appalachian Region Interstate Compact (Virginia, West Virginia)
- Pacific Northwest Economic Region (States of Alaska, Idaho, Montana, Oregon, Washington, with the Canadian jurisdictions of Alberta, Saskatchewan, British Columbia, Northwest Territories)
- Interstate Compact on Licensure of Participants in Horse Racing with Pari-Mutuel Wagering (15 states)
- Southern Growth Policies Compact (12 states)

=== Education ===
- Rivendell Interstate School District (New Hampshire, Vermont)
- Dresden School District (New Hampshire, Vermont)
- Education Commission of the States (all states [except Washington State]; three territories; and Washington, D.C.)
- Western Interstate Commission for Higher Education
- New England Board of Higher Education

=== Energy ===
- Regional Greenhouse Gas Initiative (Connecticut, Delaware, Maine, Maryland, Massachusetts, New Hampshire, New Jersey, New York, Rhode Island, Vermont, and Virginia)
- Northwest Power and Conservation Council (Oregon, Washington, Montana, and Idaho)
- Interstate Oil and Gas Compact Commission
- Southern States Energy Compact (18 states)
- Appalachian States Low-Level Radioactive Waste Compact (Delaware, Maryland, Pennsylvania, West Virginia)
- Central Interstate Low-Level Radioactive Waste Compact (Arkansas, Kansas, Louisiana, Oklahoma)
- Central Midwest Low-Level Radioactive Waste Compact (Illinois, Kentucky)
- Midwest Interstate Low-Level Radioactive Waste Compact (Indiana, Iowa, Minnesota, Missouri, Ohio, Wisconsin)
- Northeast Interstate Low-Level Radioactive Waste Management Compact (Atlantic Compact; Connecticut, New Jersey, South Carolina)
- Northwest Interstate Compact on Low-Level Radioactive Waste Management (Alaska, Hawaii, Idaho, Montana, Oregon, Utah, Washington, Wyoming)
- Rocky Mountain Low-Level Radioactive Waste Compact
- Southeast Interstate Low-Level Radioactive Waste Compact
- Southwestern Low-Level Radioactive Waste Disposal Compact
- Texas Low-Level Radioactive Waste Disposal Compact
- Western Interstate Nuclear Compact (Alaska, Arizona, California, Colorado, Idaho, Montana, Nevada, New Mexico, Oregon, Utah, Washington, Wyoming)

=== Other ===
- Interstate Compact on the Placement of Children (all 50 states)
- Interstate Compact on Educational Opportunity for Military Children (all states, and the United States Department of Defense in an ex-officio, non-voting role)
- Interstate Commission for Adult Offender Supervision (all states, two territories, and Washington, D.C.)
- Driver License Compact (all states except Georgia, Massachusetts, Tennessee, and Wisconsin)
- Electronic Registration Information Center (32 states and Washington, D.C.)
- Multistate Tax Commission (all states except Delaware, Nevada, and Virginia)
- Interstate Compact on Industrialized/Modular Buildings (Minnesota, New Jersey, North Dakota, Rhode Island)
- Interstate Insurance Product Regulation Compact (45 states and D.C.)
- Interstate Insurance Receivership Compact (Illinois, Michigan, Nebraska)

== Non-operating interstate compacts ==
=== With at least one state ===
- National Popular Vote Interstate Compact, which will not take effect until additional states join the compact to send all their electors to the electoral college based on the results of the popular vote. Currently joined by 18 states and the District of Columbia, amounting to 222 (out of a minimum 270) Electoral College votes, as of early 2026.

=== No longer active ===
- Northeast Interstate Dairy Compact, cancelled in 2001 by an act of Congress
- Transportation Climate Initiative, a proposed compact among the same states as the Regional Greenhouse Gas Initiative
- Waterfront Commission of New York Harbor (New Jersey and New York) (Dissolved in 2023 after New Jersey withdrew from the pact)

=== Proposed ===
- Phase Out Corporate Giveaways Interstate Compact, proposed compact that would commit signatory states to ending the economic development practice of providing targeted subsidies, tax abatements, and other forms of financial incentives to private companies
- Potomac Compact for Fair Representation, proposed compact to mutually establish independent redistricting commissions for congressional redistricting, initially between Virginia and Maryland.

== See also ==
- American Association of State Highway and Transportation Officials, United States Numbered Highway System, and the United States Bicycle Route System
- Enhanced cooperation, a similar system in the European Union
- Occupational licensing, a more recent focus of newer interstate compacts
- Treaty, an agreement between two or more international actors (usually sovereign states)
- See Category:Agreements entered into by subnational governments for other agreements entered into by subnational governments
  - Category:Interlocal agreements in the United States for agreements entered into between local governments
  - Category:Interprovincial agreements in Canada for agreements between Canadian provinces and territories

== Works cited ==
- Neale, Thomas H.; Nolan, Andrew (October 28, 2019). The National Popular Vote (NPV) Initiative: Direct Election of the President by Interstate Compact (Report). Congressional Research Service.
