= ASMFC =

ASMFC may refer to:

- Atlantic States Marine Fisheries Commission, a commission in the United States.
- AS Monaco FC, a French soccer club.
