= Mutual aid (emergency services) =

Agreement among emergency responders to lend assistance across jurisdictional boundaries

In emergency services, mutual aid is an agreement among emergency responders to lend assistance across jurisdictional boundaries. This may occur due to an emergency response that exceeds local resources, such as a disaster or a multiple-alarm fire. Mutual aid may be ad hoc, requested only when such an emergency occurs. It may also be a formal standing agreement for cooperative emergency management on a continuing basis, such as ensuring that resources are dispatched from the nearest fire station, regardless of which side of the jurisdictional boundary the incident is on. Agreements that send closest resources are regularly referred to as "automatic aid agreements".

Mutual aid may also extend beyond local response. Several states have statewide mutual aid systems. Examples include Washington and Oregon statewide mobilization programs. MABAS (Mutual Aid Box Alarm System) is a regional mutual aid system, headquartered in Illinois, with 1500 member fire departments in Illinois, Indiana, Wisconsin, Iowa, Michigan, and Missouri.

Utility companies usually also have mutual aid agreements.

== Examples ==
Large municipalities typically have enough fire and emergency medical services resources to handle large local incidents. However, in the case of multiple alarm fires, mass casualty incidents (MCIs) or large-scale hazardous material (hazmat) incidents, that municipality may call in resources from surrounding towns to either respond directly to the incident scene or take up quarters in their fire and EMS stations and respond to other incidents in that city or town when local crews are handling a protracted incident. Additionally, if one municipality's resources are on active calls and unable to respond to a concurrent call for service, a neighboring municipality may be dispatched.

Other agreements are common in small towns that have either no resources or limited resources. In these cases, local crews are capable of handling small incidents themselves, but in the case of larger incidents, surrounding municipalities will be called in along with the local resources upon initial dispatch. For instance, local fire and EMS departments will typically handle fire alarm activations and automobile crashes while reports of structure fires will cause the automatic dispatch (automatic aid) of surrounding towns.

Where a town has no resources of its own, it may contract with one or more surrounding towns to provide all coverage.

Such calls for mutual aid are the results of incident escalations as determined by the incident commander. The responses required from other towns are predefined, so all a dispatcher has to do is call the appropriate resources as determined by the "run card" for such an incident.

International mutual aid is also common on border communities in places such as Maine, New Hampshire, Vermont, New York, and others.

== See also ==
- Emergency Management Assistance Compact (EMAC) – An interstate mutual-aid compact in the United States
- Airport-to-Airport Mutual Aid
