= Hunting license =

Regulatory or legal mechanism to control hunting

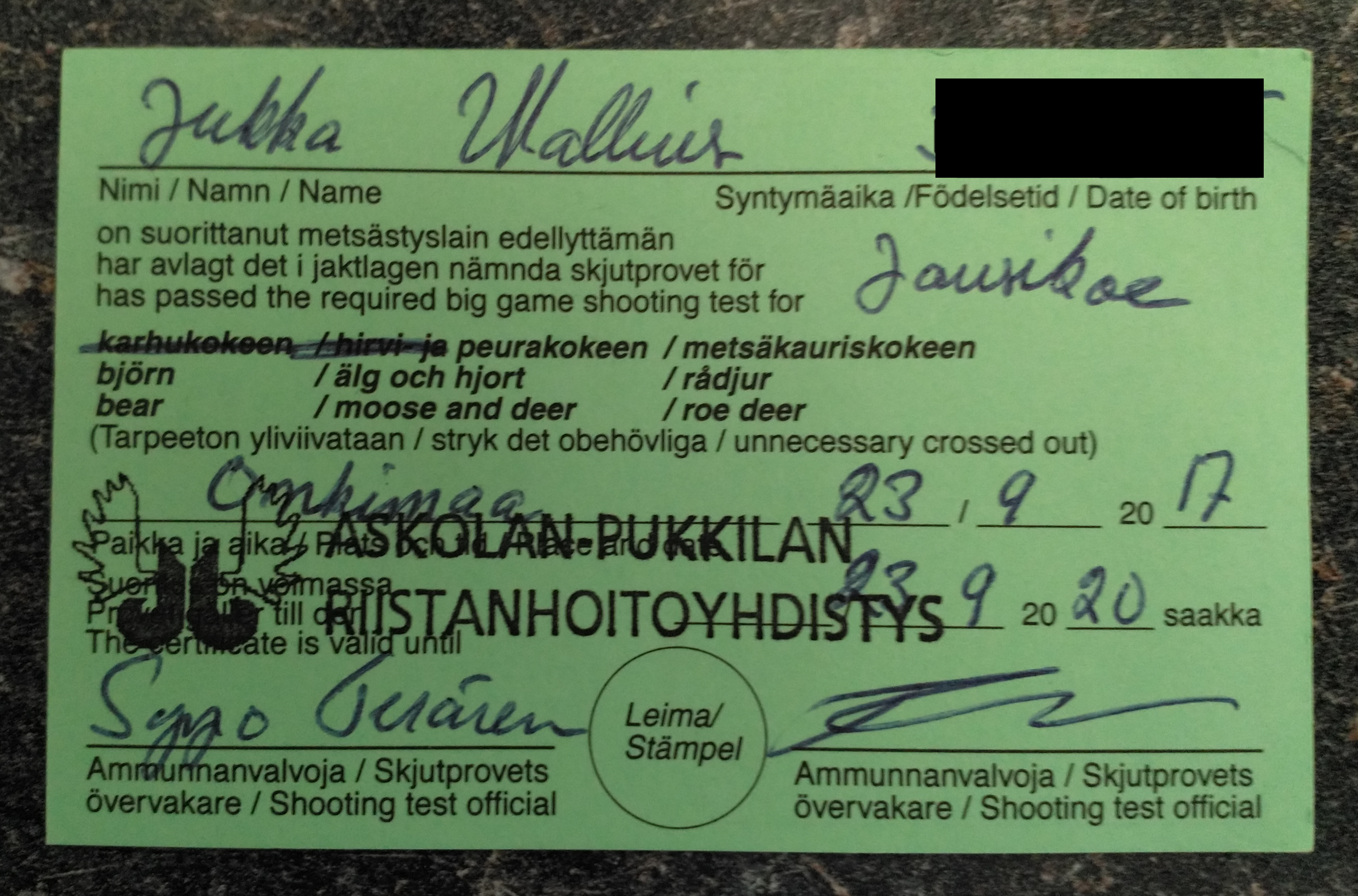
Finnish bowhunting license

Canadian hunting licenses from Ontario, 1938-1940

A hunting license or hunting permit is a regulatory or legal mechanism to control hunting, both commercial and recreational. A license specifically made for recreational (game) hunting is sometimes called a game license or game permit. Hunting activities beyond the permission of such licensing are typically regarded as poaching and thus wrongful or criminal.

Hunting may be regulated formally via game laws issued by a legislature or government agency, or informally by unwritten conventions, self-restraint ethics or moral code among the hunter community. The purposes for requiring hunting licenses include natural resource management, conservation of vulnerable/endangered species and raising tax revenue (often, but not always, to dedicated funds). Some laws require a specific waiting period between application and receiving a license.

== History ==
Hunting licenses are millennia old. Amongst the first hunting laws in the Common law tradition was from the time of William the Conqueror (reign in England starting 1066). In the Peterborough Chronicle entry of 1087, The Rime of King William reported in verse that:

Whoever killed a hart or a hind
Should be blinded.

This was because "William the Conqueror's moral life lives in the landscape. His control of the forest mirrors his control of the people, and his establishment of hunting laws reveals the dissonance between his love for animals and his contempt for the populace: ...".

He loved the wild animals
As if he were their father.

A whole distinct field of law was created outside of the Common Law, called the Forest Law, in the Middle Ages, although there were some restrictions in Magna Carta.

== Purposes ==
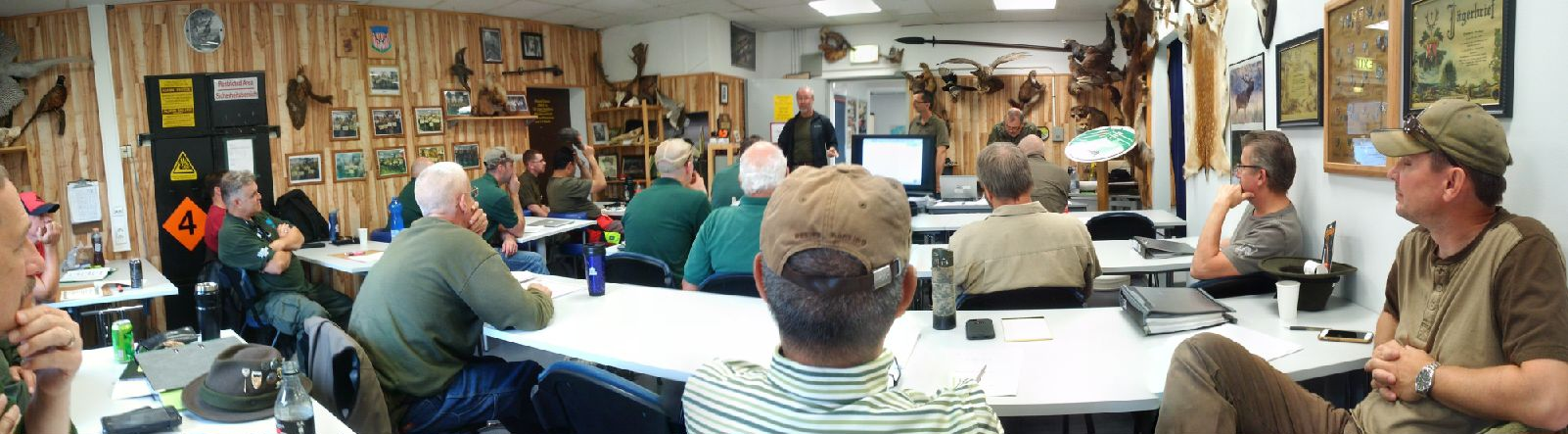
U.S. Forces hunting instructors representing garrisons Ansbach, Bavaria, Rheinland-Pfalz, Stuttgart and Wiesbaden, as well as Ramstein and Spangdahlem Air Bases complete recertification at Grafenwoehr, Baumholder in Germany

Mandating of hunting licenses are done for several purposes, include:

- Public safety, especially of children, both as hunters and bystanders;
- Management and conservation of wildlife;
- Revenue or fundraising for the sovereign state or local government;
- Control of animal-borne diseases such as Lyme disease and rabies.

The safety issues are especially highlighted in urban/suburban areas and shopping districts. For example, after in an incident in November 2012 whereby a man allegedly shot at a deer in a Walmart parking lot in Pennsylvania, he was charged with "reckless endangerment, ... hunting without a license, shooting on or across highways and unlawful killing or taking of big game".

== Australia ==
All gun owners in Australia must have a firearms licence (see gun laws in Australia), but normally do not require a licence to hunt feral or invasive pest species (e.g. rabbits, foxes and feral pigs). Most introduced species that can be hunted recreationally during open seasons (mostly deers) do still require a hunting licence, whether with firearms or using bows, and almost all native animals (except some duck, quail and kangaroo species) are protected. Landowners may obtain a "Destruction Permit" to kill or remove native species when their numbers impact agriculture. Hunting in New South Wales national parks requires a R-licence issued by the Game Council, but (as of mid-2013) this situation has been suspended pending review.

Professional hunters are issued what is sometimes referred to as a D-licence, but rather than being a hunting licence this is a category of firearms licence that includes semi-automatics and large-capacity magazines.

== Canada ==
Hunting regulation and licensing fall under both provincial/territorial and federal jurisdiction. The federal government is responsible for protecting migratory birds and nationally significant wildlife habitat, the regulation for endangered species and the international wildlife issues and treaties (i.e. CITES) for Canada. For example, Migratory Game Bird Hunting licence is issued by the Canadian Wildlife Service, an agency of Environment Canada. All other matters fall under the provincial/territorial jurisdiction.

The use of firearms in hunting is also separated into provincial/territorial and federal jurisdiction. Whereas the Canadian Firearms Program will determine who is eligible for a Possession and Acquisition Licence and issuance of firearm registration certificates, it is the provincial/territorial government's responsibility to regulate when and how the firearms can be used in hunting animals.

In Quebec hunter education and licensing is managed by the Fédération québécoise des chasseurs et pêcheurs (FédéCP). Sécurité Nature, a program managed by the FédéCP, offers a variety of hunting education courses that allow residents to hunt legally after obtaining their licence and a permit at designated outlets (most hunting & fishing stores, Canadian Tires, etc.) for a fee.

== Chile ==
In Chile hunting licenses are issued by the Servicio Agricola Ganadero (SAG) of the Ministry of Agriculture. Small game licenses (defined as animals under 40 kg adult weight, such as birds, and mammals like rabbits, and beaver, among others) and large game licenses (animals such as deer and wild hogs) are issued, which require passing a written test with a percentage of correct answers of 70% for small-game and 85% large-game, and are valid for two calendar years. A gun permit is not needed as air gun and archery are popular methods for hunting, but those with firearms registered for hunting are able to obtain a transport permit for such weapons having a valid hunting license.

== Germany ==
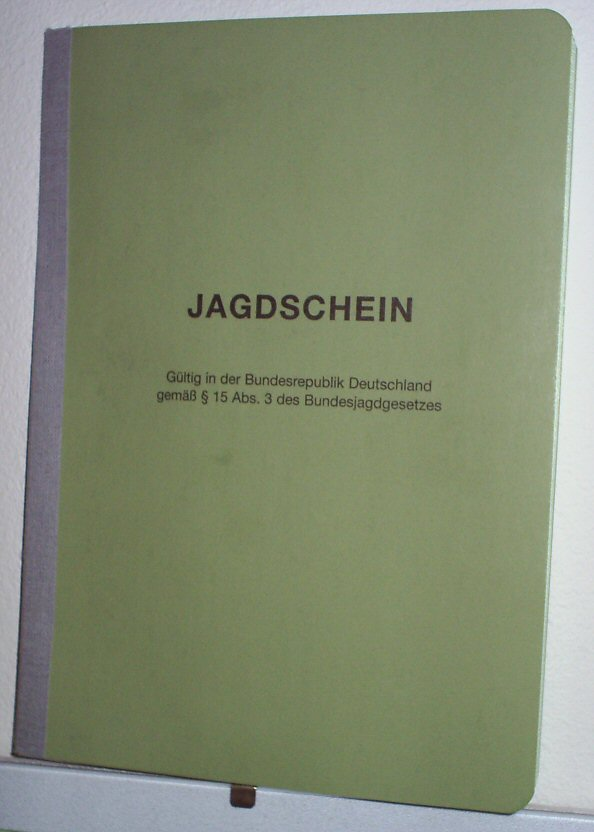
German hunting license (2004)

A German hunting license is a certificate that grants its holder the exercise of hunting within legal ordinances. It is also the precondition to own hunting arms and ammunition (unlimited number of rifles/shotguns and up to two handguns). The actual right to exercise hunting in a specific area is entitled to the respective landowners (if they own an area of more than 0.75 square kilometres (190 acres), otherwise all landowners of a municipality are integrated into an association) who may use their right for themselves or lease it. Depending on size and value of a hunting area a typical leasing rate may vary from about US$10–100 per acre per year. Additionally the lesse has to pay the landowner any damage by deer, wild hogs etc. The right to hunt is connected to the duty to care for all kind of animals listed by the hunting laws. For several species such as deer plans have to be developed by hunters and authorities, how many animals of a specified class and age may (or have to) be killed within a certain period of time. The purpose of the hunting license is to ensure that only well trained persons may exercise hunting. Applicants must fulfill the following requirements:

- Successful completion of a hunting exam,
- Certificate of a liability insurance for hunters,
- Personal trustworthiness (§ 5 German Weapons Act),
- Applicants must be at least 16 years for a Youth Hunting License, otherwise 18 years,
- Flawless Criminal record.

The hunting exam is a test of expertise with a high failure rate. To pass it, each applicant has to participate in a comprehensive, difficult instruction course which consists largely of the areas shooting (shotgun and rifle), theory (esp. weaponry, local wildlife and habitat) and practice.

In practice the German system of examination for deer hunters (stalkers) is very much in line with the English DMQ level DSC2. Over the last ten years or so European countries in general have made efforts to harmonise the previously fragmented rules and regulations with parallels being taken from the more difficult UK system.

== United States ==
In the United States, regulation of hunting is primarily performed by state law; additional regulations are imposed through Federal environmental law regarding migratory birds (such as ducks and geese) and endangered species.

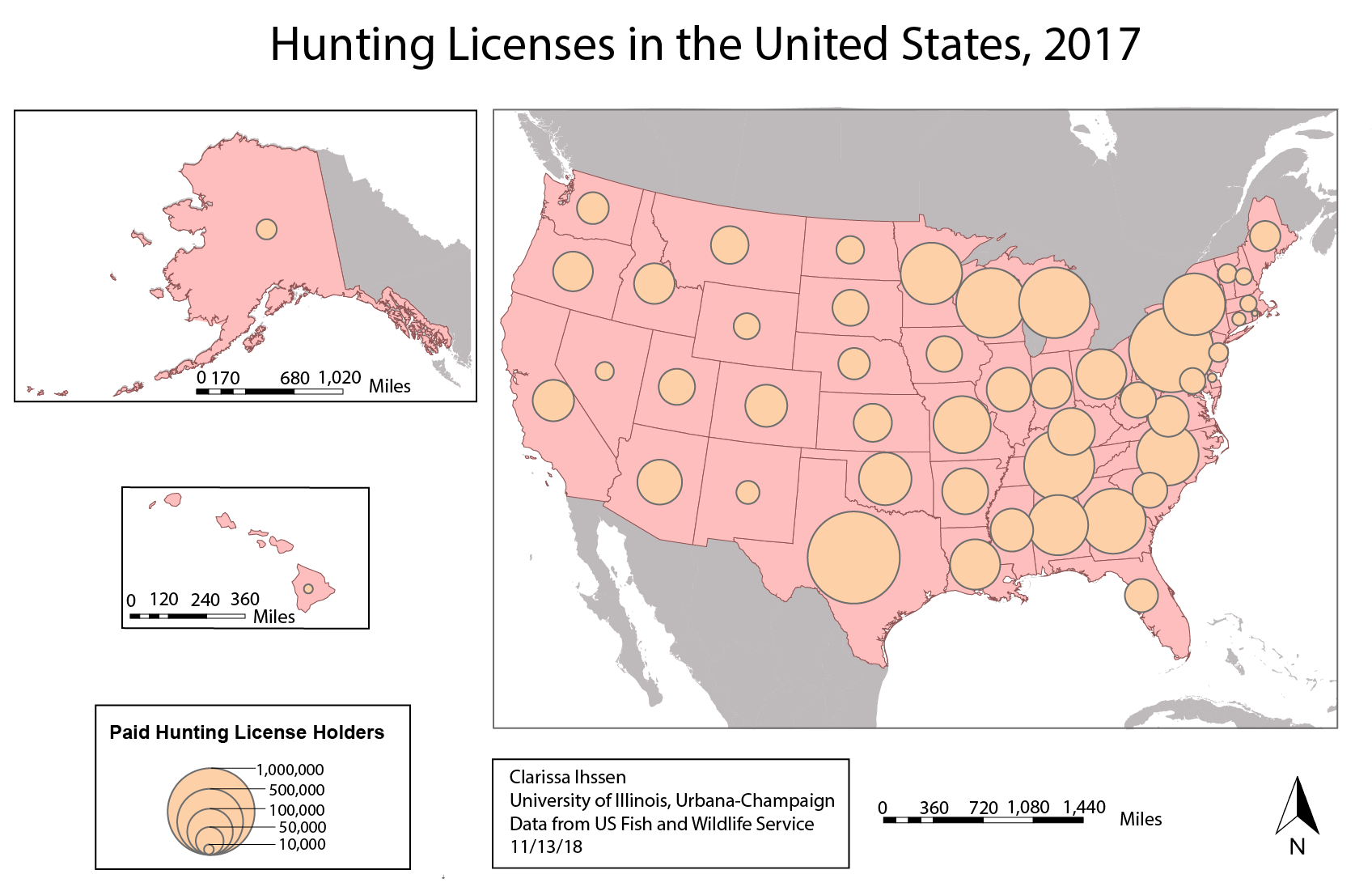
A map of total hunting licenses purchased in the United States in 2017

Like many licenses, a hunting license is considered a privilege granted by the government, rather than a constitutional right under the Second Amendment.

As a general rule, unprotected pest species are not subject to a hunting license. Vermin may be hunted without a license, or may even be the subject of a bounty paid to the hunter.

A Federal law, the Airborne Hunting Act (AHA), was passed in 1971 with the goal of eliminating aerial hunting, that is, shooting wildlife from planes or helicopters.

=== State licenses ===
Each state has different standards and paperwork requirements for getting a hunting license. These include the areas, time periods, harvesting techniques, distinctions between species, and a hunting safety course.

Licenses to hunt typically go on sale once a year. Some states, such as New York, allow only during a defined single season, or for a lifetime during such seasons for residents of the state, upon payment of the appropriate fees. As a general rule, hunting licenses are non-transferable, are a privilege (not a right), and does not allow trespass on private land.

Hunting big game typically requires a tag for each animal harvested. Tags must be purchased in addition to the hunting license, and the number of tags issued to an individual is typically limited. In cases where there are more prospective hunters than the quota for that species, tags are usually assigned by lottery. Tags may be further restricted to a specific area or wildlife management unit.

In Florida, a "permit" for a "regulated hunt" was approved effective September 1, 2025, for the first Black bear hunt season since 2015. The first season will be from December 6 through 28, 2025, which "will allow up to 187 bears to be 'harvested'."

States with these "tags" include Alaska, California, Florida, Georgia, Illinois, Louisiana, New York, Ohio, Tennessee, Texas, and Virginia.

49 of the 50 states require a prospective big game hunter take a several-hour course about safety, often termed sportsman education or "hunter's safety course" in the case of California.

Such jurisdictions also may limit getting a hunting license to adults or may grant a "junior" license for persons as young as twelve years of age.

Several United States and Canadian provinces have joined in an Interstate Wildlife Violator Compact (IWVC) to control interstate hunting and to punish violators of differing laws.

=== Federal licenses ===
Federal law requires the purchase of a duck stamp in order to shoot migratory waterfowl. They are regulated by the U.S. Fish and Wildlife Service.

United States law also mandates strict limits on the hunting ("taking") of endangered species. The U.S. is a signatory to the Convention on International Trade in Endangered Species of Wild Fauna and Flora (CITES). The Bush Administration proposed lifting some restrictions in 2005 (for antelopes), as did the Norwegian Government (for wolves) in the same year.

=== Exemptions ===
Both Federal and state laws exempt the following:

1. Pest species, as noted above, such as rodents. There is a false urban legend that a hunting license is required to trap mice.
2. Native Americans based on Native American treaties; some states require residency on a Native American reservation. The Supreme Court of the United States held in Menominee Tribe v. United States that Congress must affirmatively take away Native Americans' hunting rights; otherwise, Native Americans are presumed to have such rights and do not require hunting licenses. Some states have made treaties that specifically allow Native Americans to fish and hunt without permits or licenses; for example, 1666 Articles of Peace and Amity.
3. Specific statutes, such as the Marine Mammal Protection Act and eagle feather laws (see below).
4. Alaskan Natives.
5. Active service members of the military, who often get free licenses.
6. The blind.
7. Sport hunting for targets.
8. Youth are usually exempt from paying for a hunting or fishing license, but this varies by state from those under 12 years old to those under 16 years of age.

=== Eagle Feather Law ===
The Eagle feather law, (Title 50 Part 22 of the Code of Federal Regulations), stipulates that only individuals of certifiable American Indian ancestry enrolled in a federally recognized tribe are legally authorized to obtain eagle feathers for religious or spiritual use. American Indians and non-American Indians frequently contest the value and validity of the Eagle feather law, charging that the law is laden with discriminatory racial preferences and infringes on tribal sovereignty. Their arguments include that the law does not allow American Indians to give eagle feathers to non-American Indians, a common modern and traditional practice. (Many non-American Indians have been adopted into American Indian families, made tribal members, and given eagle feathers.)

=== Challenges regarding the Second Amendment ===
Some hunters have challenged hunting licenses, as being in violation of the right to keep and bear arms as guaranteed by Second Amendment to the United States Constitution; the Supreme Court of the US in February 2008, heard arguments on the proper standard of review for gun laws or regulations. However, in District of Columbia v. Heller, the Court declined to examine the broader issues, leaving state hunting licenses valid and in force.

The current law is unclear as to what standard of review would apply, but the rational basis or arbitrary and capricious tests are the most likely standards. Under either standard, most hunting license regimes in the United States would likely pass muster, due to the need to conserve natural resources, to enforce the police power, and to raise revenue, all valid purposes of such laws.

=== Public policy arguments ===
Most major conservation organizations in the US favor the continued legality and regulation of hunting, including Ducks Unlimited, the National Wildlife Federation, and The Wilderness Society. The Defenders of Wildlife, National Audubon Society, and the World Wildlife Fund also support licenses for regulated hunting of wildlife.

The Sierra Club supports hunting licenses, but there has been tension in the group for two decades between those who want to ally with hunters and to regulate them, and those opposed to hunting altogether.

The American Humane Association and the People for the Ethical Treatment of Animals are opposed to hunting, and would ban the practice rather than regulating it.

== Argentina ==
In order to obtain a Hunting License in Argentina, an exam about the local hunting laws, wildlife conservation, safety and hunting rules must be approved. The hunter must also have a gun permit provided by RENAR, and a fee must be paid.

== Peru ==
In order to hunt in Peru, the sport hunter requires a hunting license provided by the Agriculture Ministry through SERFOR. As requirement for obtaining the Hunting License, a Hunter Education Course must be passed, according to the Ley Forestal y de Fauna Silvestre 29763. Wildlife management plan for game species is focused on conservation principles and is detailed through the hunting calendars for different regions of the country, in which hunting seasons, fees and quotas per game species are determined. Additionally, to the Hunting License, a hunting authorization is required for each particular region. If firearms are used for sport hunting, a gun license is also a requirement.

== See also ==
- Bag limits
- Game law
- Hunting season
- Fishing license
- Firearms license
- Poaching
