= DRBC =

DRBC can stand for:

- Democratic Reform British Columbia, a Canadian political party
- Delaware River Basin Commission, an American water management agency
