= SRBC =

SRBC can stand for:

- CD2, a cell adhesion molecule found on the surface of T cells and natural killer (NK) cells
- Southern Railway of British Columbia, a Canadian short line railway branded as SRY Rail Link
- Susquehanna River Basin Commission, a water management agency in the United States created by interstate compact
