= Tarrant Regional Water District v. Herrmann =

- Supreme Court of the United States

Argued April 23, 2013 Decided June 13, 2013
- Full case name: Tarrant Regional Water District, Petitioner v. Rudolf John Herrmann, et al.
- Docket no.: 11–889
- Citations: 569 U.S. 614 (more)
- Opinion announcement: Opinion announcement

Case history
- Prior: CIV-07-0045-HE Tarrant Regional Water District v. Herrmann, NO. CIV-07-0045-HE, (W.D. Okla. July 16, 2010); Tarrant Regional Water District v. Sevenoaks (Tarrant II), 545 F.3d 906, 909 (10th Cir., 2008). Tarrant Regional Water District v. Herrmann, 10th Cir., No. 10-6184, September 7, 2011

Holding
- The Red River Compact does not preempt Oklahoma’s water statutes because the Compact creates no cross-border rights in its signatories for these statutes to infringe. Nor do Oklahoma’s laws run afoul of the Commerce Clause.

Court membership
- Chief Justice John Roberts Associate Justices Antonin Scalia · Anthony Kennedy; Clarence Thomas · Ruth Bader Ginsburg; Stephen Breyer · Samuel Alito; Sonia Sotomayor · Elena Kagan

Case opinion
- Majority: Sotomayor, joined by unanimous

Tarrant Regional Water District v. Herrmann, 569 U.S. 614 (2013), was a United States Supreme Court case in which the Court held that Oklahoma statutes forbidding the export of water from the state are not preempted or forbidden by the Red River Compact.

== Background ==
Since 1980, water from the Red River of the South has been allocated by the Red River Compact, which had been signed by the four basin states in 1978 before being ratified by Congress. However, since the signing of the Compact there had been large-scale population growth in the Dallas–Fort Worth metroplex which lies just south from the Red River basin, which by the middle 2000s had led to substantial water shortages in Tarrant County and a number of adjacent counties covered by the Compact. Consequently, in 2007 the Tarrant Regional Water District asked the Oklahoma Water Resources Board to purchase water from the Kiamichi River, and also asked the Oklahoma Apache Tribe for permission to purchase groundwater from within Stephens County. However, Oklahoma has a moratorium on out-of-state water sales. Texas appealed to the federal District Court for the Western District of Oklahoma because they believed that the Dormant Commerce Clause and the Supremacy Clause barred Oklahoma's statutes that prevent out-of-state water sales.

Initially, the District Court would deny the Oklahoma Water Resources Board's motion to dismiss the case. However Judge Joe L. Heaton suggested that the moratorium applied not only to contracts (as the Oklahoma Water Resources Board had argued), but also to Tarrant Regional Water District's permit application. Judge Heaton did allow further appeals to higher courts, but once the Tarrant Regional Water District appealed to the Tenth Circuit, it was ruled by that court that Oklahoma's statutes were entirely consistent with the Red River Compact. The Tenth Circuit concluded that the Red River Compact was designed so that each state would possess complete control over those waters within its boundaries.

The Tenth Circuit would also resoundingly rule against Tarrant Regional Water District's attempt to purchase water from the Apache Tribe in Stephens County, Oklahoma. In this context the Tenth Circuit argued that none of the parties had filed for a permit to use the groundwater and that the controversy is not even justiciable.

== See also ==
- List of United States Supreme Court cases, volume 569
