= Interstate Civil Defense and Disaster Compact =

The Interstate Civil Defense and Disaster Compact is an interstate compact that established a system for administering disaster response and defense aid. It originally included 22 states and the District of Columbia, but some states have since replaced it with the Emergency Management Assistance Compact. The compact was made as a state response to the Federal Civil Defense Act of 1950.
