= Airport-to-airport mutual aid =

Voluntary disaster relief aid between airports

Airport-to-airport mutual aid programs provide expert assistance and material support to an airport that has been affected by a natural or manmade disaster on a voluntary basis from other airports. The concept has been described as "airports helping airports."

The first example in the world was the Southeast Airports Disaster Operations Group (SEADOG), which was founded in 2004-2005 under the leadership of Savannah-Hilton Head International Airport and Orlando International Airport. The initial emphasis of SEADOG was assistance to airports recovering from hurricanes. SEADOG's first mobilization was to Pensacola International Airport after Hurricane Ivan in 2004. SEADOG's most notable mobilizations were to Louis Armstrong New Orleans International Airport and Gulfport-Biloxi International Airport after Hurricane Katrina in 2005 and to Jack Brooks Regional Airport to assist with urban search and rescue operations after Hurricane Ike hit Galveston and Houston in 2008. More than 20 airports from all over the U.S. contributed assistance through SEADOG after Hurricane Katrina. SEADOG has a dedicated website.

In 2007, the Western Airports Disaster Operations Group (WESTDOG) was formed under the leadership of Portland International Airport. WESTDOG's mission was nearly identical to that of SEADOG although WESTDOG's primary focus is earthquakes, but there are minor administrative differences between the two disaster operations groups (DOGs). Unlike SEADOG, joining WESTDOG requires a formal resolution by the airport authority, port authority, city, or county that owns the airport. WESTDOG has a written operations manual and a dedicated website (WESTDOG 2011-2013).

The fundamental principles of airport-to-airport mutual aid are that no one can help an airport as well as someone from another airport, no mandatory requirement to send assistance, no self-deployment, matching of specific needs for skilled airport personnel and equipment to volunteered personnel and equipment, and self-sufficiency of the deployed assistance teams. Since the DOGs are mutual aid programs, there are no financial arrangement built into the program. If an airport deploys through SEADOG or WESTDOG in a disaster that is the subject of a Presidential disaster declaration, then reimbursement and liability coverage under the Stafford Act and using the procedures of the Emergency Management Assistance Compact (EMAC) apply.

Both SEADOG and WESTDOG depend on coordinating airports that volunteer for that role. SEADOG has four airports that coordinate geographic regions and three specialized coordinators for aircraft rescue and fire fighting (ARFF), law enforcement and security, and rapid engineering assessment. The airports serving in these roles have indefinite terms. WESTDOG has a primary coordinating airport and a secondary coordinating airport that serve one-year terms, with the secondary airport moving up into the primary role after one year. Both DOGs have created permanent communications systems for the dissemination of alerts and the management of volunteered resources and matching of volunteers to need. SEADOG and WESTDOG communicate closely and collaborate. They had their first joint SEADOG-WESTDOG Annual Conference at Dallas/Fort Worth International Airport on 16–18 October 2013.

There are no DOGs in any other region of the United States (IEM et al. 2012). However, airports outside the southeastern and western states have provided aid through SEADOG. Membership in SEADOG or WESTDOG is open to any airport regardless of location in the United States.

There is a third airport-to-airport mutual aid program, the Colorado Aviation Recovery Support Team (CARST). Established by the Colorado Airport Operators Association (CAOA), CARST provides specialized, highly experienced airport and aviation professions to help an airport or community deal with issues involved in recovering from a crash. CARST grew out of experiences with the Avjet crash at Aspen-Pitken County Airport (ASE/KASE) in 2001.

In 2012 the Airport Cooperative Research Program (ACRP) of the Transportation Research Board (TRB) of the National Academies published a guidebook for how to establish, manage, and sustain an airport-to-airport mutual aid program. It is ACRP Report 73.

There are no airport-to-airport mutual aid programs outside the United States, but the feasibility of an airport-to-airport mutual aid program for Latin America and the Caribbean has begun to be considered by the International Civil Aviation Organization (ICAO) of the United Nations (UN), the Federal Aviation Administration (FAA), and several other organizations. Many observers have believed that mutual aid could not operate across national borders because of barriers created by legal, language, and cultural differences and delays created by work rules, customs and duties, and immigration. It has been proposed that inclusion of airlines, national agencies, and international agencies and industry associations such as the International Air Transport Association (IATA), Airports Council International (ACI), and American Association of Airport Executives (AAAE) can overcome such barriers by sharing their day-to-day expertise operating internationally. Formalization of the proposal is expected in 2014. If the DOG for Latin America and the Caribbean is implemented in full or as a pilot project in a subregion such as the Caribbean Basin or Central America, it will probably be the first cross-border airport-to-airport mutual aid program in the world outside the United States.
