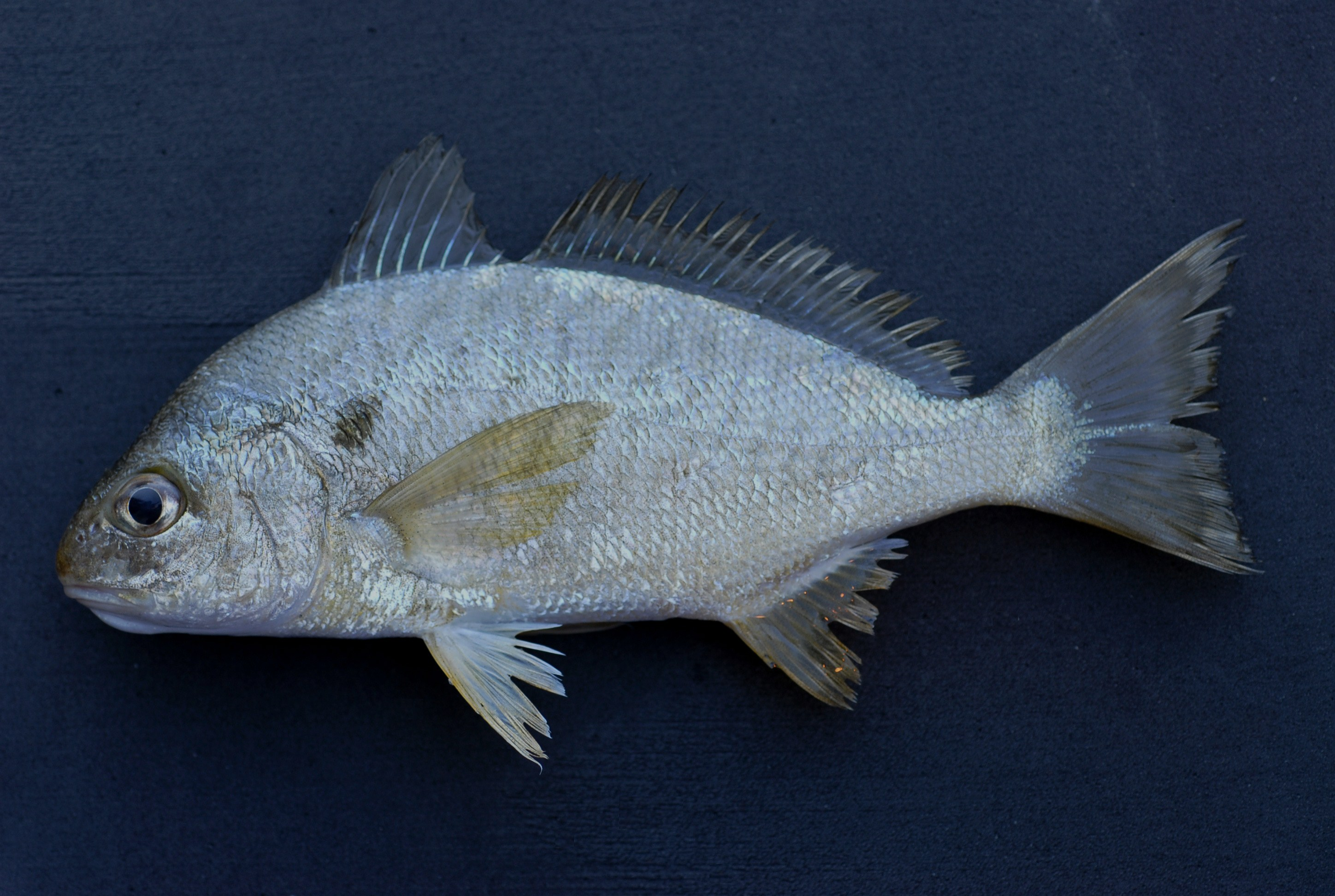

Conservation status
- Least Concern (IUCN 3.1)

Scientific classification
- Kingdom: Animalia
- Phylum: Chordata
- Class: Actinopterygii
- Division: Teleostei
- Order: Acanthuriformes
- Family: Sciaenidae
- Genus: Leiostomus
- Species: L. xanthurus

Binomial name
- Leiostomus xanthurus Lacépède, 1802
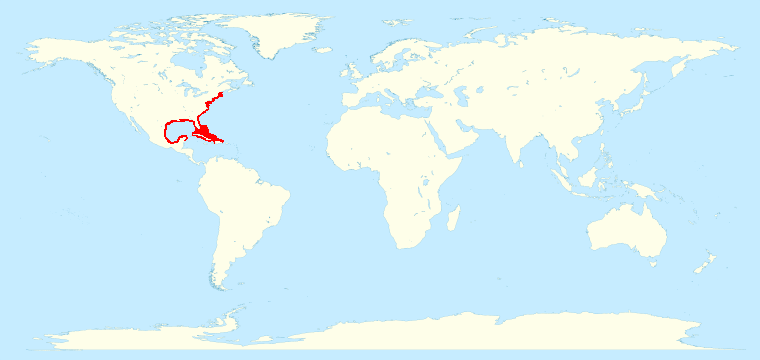
- Spot range map

= Spot (fish) =

Species of fish

The spot (Leiostomus xanthurus),Norfolk spot and the Virginia spot, is a species of small short-lived saltwater fish in the family Sciaenidae. The species inhabits estuary and coastal waters from Massachusetts to Texas, and derives its name from the prominent dark spot behind each gill. It is the only species in the genus Leiostomus. Spot are frequently caught by recreational anglers and are good to eat.

== Taxonomy ==
The spot was first formally described in 1802 by the French naturalist Bernard Germain de Lacépède with its type locality given as Carolina. Lacépède named this new species in a new monospecific genus, Leiostomus. This genus has been placed in the subfamily Sciaeninae by some workers, but the 5th edition of Fishes of the World does not recognise subfamilies within the Sciaenidae which it places in the order Acanthuriformes.

== Etymology ==
The spot's generic name, Leiostomus means "smooth mouth" and refers to the toothless lower jaw. The specific name xanthurus means "yellow tail" and is a misnomer as the tail is not yellow, but it may have been confused for Bairdiella chrysoura.

== Description ==
The spot is relatively deep-bodied and compressed with a humped back. The mouth is almost horizontal and is equipped with bands of small teeth. There is no barbel on the chin but there are five pores there with more pores on the snout, five on the sides and five at the front. The upper angle of the operculum is incised and the edge of the preoperculum is smooth and not serrated. The dorsal fin is deeply incised, the incision separating the front, spiny part of the fin with 11 spines and the rear soft-rayed part which is supported by 29 to 35 soft rays. The anal fin contains two spines and 12 or 13 soft rays, the second spine being half the length of the first soft ray. The caudal fin is truncate, sometimes slightly notched. They have large ctenoid scales, except for those beneath the eye and on the lower head which are cycloid. A scale row, or two, runs along the base of the soft-rayed part of the dorsal fin. This species reaches a maximum total length of 36 cm (14 in), although 25 cm (9.8 in) is more typical. The color of the body is bluish-gray on the upper body becoming yellow or golden on the lower body. In young fishes there is a series of dark bars run diagonally from the back to the middle of the flanks, these fade as the fish ages. There is a large black spot on the body above the upper margin of the operculum.

== Distribution and habitat ==
The spot is native to the west central and northwest regions on the Atlantic Ocean. It is found along the Gulf of Mexico, along the southern coast of the U.S from Massachusetts and down to Campeche, Mexico. It is typically found in depths no more than 6 meters, but can be found up to 50 meters in depth. The spot lives in salt waters, especially brackish waters, mostly over sandy and muddy seabeds. It lives in the estuaries and bays until spring, when it migrates to the deeper waters that it spawns in. During summer, it moves to water with a higher salinity, and then it moves offshore once autumn begins, and the water begins to cool.

== Diet ==
The spot is omnivorous, and eats benthic invertebrates, small crustaceans, and plant and animal detritus. This includes polychaetes, worms, small fish, small plankton, and mollusks.

== Importance for humans ==
The spot is a very important fish for both recreational and commercial fishing. In 2021 the total landing of spot in the Southern Atlantic sector of US waters was 322 t (317 long tons; 355 short tons) with 71% of that coming from recreational fishermen and 29% from commercial fisheries. 64% of the commercial landings were in Virginia.

== Reproduction and lifestyle ==
The spot spawns in fall to early winter time. It moves from its typical bay and estuary habitat to an offshore area of deeper water, where up to 1.7 million eggs may be laid. The eggs are externally fertilized and pushed back toward shore. Larvae quickly grow in the warmer offshore water and move into coastal shallows and bays for winter.

== Management ==
Spot are protected and monitored under the Chesapeake Bay Atlantic Croaker and Spot Fishery Management Plan of 1991. The 1987 fishery management plan of the Atlantic States Marine Fisheries Commission was aimed mainly at reducing the numbers of juvenile fish taken as bycatch by shrimpers.

At least one aquaculture project in New Jersey is attempting to culture spot for potential commercial production.

== In culture ==
The North Carolina Spot Festival is held at Hampstead, North Carolina, on the last weekend of September.
