= Atlantic States Marine Fisheries Commission =

Fishery commission in the United States

Atlantic States Marine Fisheries Commission

The Atlantic States Marine Fisheries Commission (ASMFC) is a commission of U.S. states formed to coordinate and manage fishery resources—including marine (saltwater) fish, shellfish, and anadromous fish (migratory fish that ascend rivers from the sea for spawning)—along the Atlantic coast of the United States.

== Mission ==
According to the ASFMC's website:

The Commission focuses on responsible stewardship of marine fisheries resources. It serves as a forum for the states to collectively address fisheries issues under the premise that as a group, using a cooperative approach, they can achieve more than they could as individuals. The Commission does not promote a particular state or a particular stakeholder sector.

Challenges faced in managing fisheries along the U.S. Atlantic coast include population growth, especially in the North; change and loss of coastal habitat; increased nutrient content in estuaries and coastal waters, called eutrophication; chemicals; pathogens; and over-exploitation of resources.

== History ==
Eastern states first began to collaborate on the management of these fisheries in 1937, when the Council of State Governments convened the first Eastern States Conservation Conference. The idea of an interstate compact was proposed at this first conference. In 1940, nine states accepted a fifteen-year compact to create a commission that would report jointly to the states and to Congress, which approved the Congress and inaugurated the Commission in 1942. The compact recognized that "fish do not adhere to political boundaries." The ASMFC collaborates with three regional fishery management councils created by the 1976 Magnuson–Stevens Fishery Conservation and Management Act (MSFCMA): New England Fishery Management Council, Mid-Atlantic Fishery Management Council, and South Atlantic Fishery Management Council.

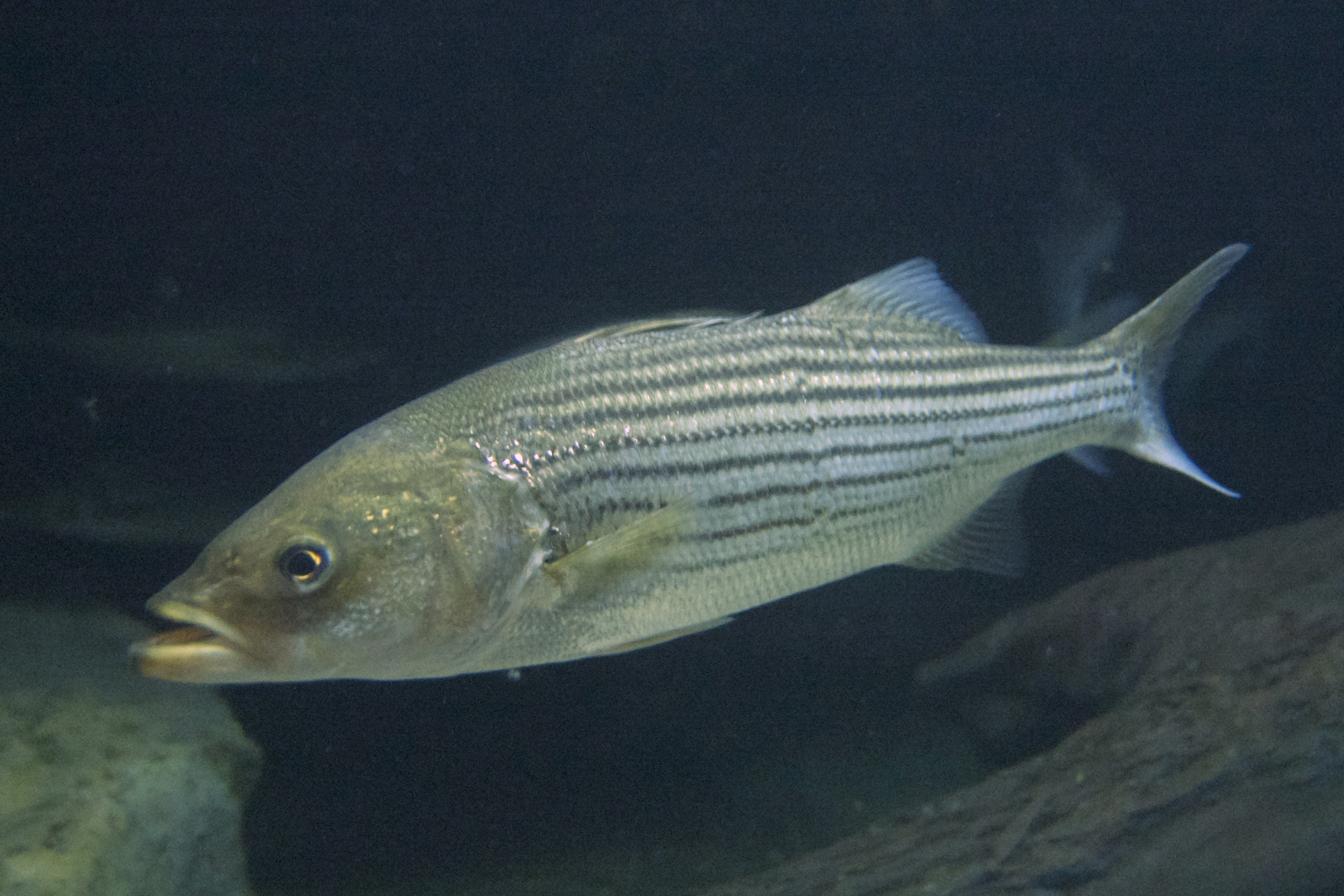
The Atlantic striped bass was the first fish that the ASMFC was given regulatory authority to manage.

Until 1984, the ASMFC only had an advisory role. The ASMFC gained regulatory authority in 1984 with the passage of the Atlantic Striped Bass Conservation Act, which was intended to enforce an interstate fisheries management plan agreed to in 1981. Under the act, the U.S. secretary of commerce could halt Atlantic striped bass fisheries in states found by the ASMFC to be noncompliant with the management plan. The Atlantic Coastal Fisheries Cooperative Management Act granted the ASMFC regulatory authority over all covered species in 1993. The 1996 amendment to the MSFCMA shifted the ASMFC's focus from regulation to long-term conservation through habitat protection.

== Structure ==
The membership grew to fifteen states, in order from north to south: Maine, New Hampshire, Massachusetts, Rhode Island, Connecticut, New York, New Jersey, Pennsylvania, Delaware, Maryland, Virginia, North Carolina, South Carolina, Georgia, and Florida.

The Commission serves as a deliberative body, coordinating the conservation and management of the state's shared near-shore fishery resources—marine, shell, and anadromous—for sustainable use. The Commission incorporates public comment and the "best scientific information" into its fact-finding and deliberation. Commissioners participate in the deliberations in the Commission's five main policy arenas: Interstate fisheries management, research and statistics, fisheries science, habitat conservation, and law enforcement.

Three Commissioners represent each member state: the director for the state's marine fisheries management agency, a member of the state legislature, and an individual appointed by the governor. The United States Fish and Wildlife Service, the National Marine Fisheries Service, the Potomac River Fisheries Commission, and the District of Columbia also have voting status on the Commission. States and other members vote on issues where they have an interest and the one-state one-vote concept allows Commissioners to address stakeholder-resource balance issues at the state level.

== ASMFC managed species ==
Currently, the ASMFC manages 27 species. These species include:

1. American eel
2. American lobster
3. Atlantic croaker
4. Atlantic herring
5. Atlantic menhaden
6. Atlantic sturgeon
7. Black Drum
8. Black sea bass
9. Bluefish
10. Coastal sharks
11. Cobia
12. Horseshoe crab
13. Jonah crab
14. Northern shrimp
15. Red drum
16. Scup
17. Shad & river herring
18. Spanish mackerel
19. Spiny dogfish
20. Spot croaker
21. Spotted seatrout
22. Striped bass
23. Summer flounder
24. Tautog
25. Weakfish
26. Winter flounder

== Evaluation ==
As of 2005, the ASMFC has been credited with successful management of Atlantic striped bass, summer flounder, and spiny dogfish populations. These results have been attributed to the ASMFC having full regulatory authority, in contrast to its counterparts, the Gulf States Marine Fisheries Commission and the Pacific States Marine Fisheries Commission, which remain purely advisory.

== Awards conferred ==
The Commission confers three types of awards:

- Captain David H. Hart awards
- Annual awards of excellence in the categories of management & policy; scientific, technical & advisory; law enforcement, and legislative
- Chairman's Award for Distinguished Meritorious Service

Representative Gerry E. Studds and Senators John H. Chaffee, Judd Gregg, and Owen Johnson have received the Chairman's Award.
