= 1666 Articles of Peace and Amity =

1666 treaty between the Province of Maryland and 12 Native American nations

The 1666 Articles of Peace and Amity was a treaty signed on 20 April 1666 between the English colony of Maryland and 12 Eastern Algonquian-speaking Indigenous nations, including the Piscataway, Anacostanck, Doegs, Mikikiwomans, Manasquesend, Mattawoman, Chingwawateick, Hangemaick, Portobackes, Sacayo, Panyayo, and Choptico. The treaty established the right of Native peoples to remain on their lands and preserved their inviolable right to continue fishing, crabbing, hunting, and fowling. The treaty also stated that "If an Indian kill an Englishman he shall dye for itt"; however execution is only prescribed for English colonists if an "English man shall kill any Indian that shall come vnpaynted [unpainted]". The treaty forbade Native peoples from entering any colonial settlements while being "painted", stating that "the English cannot easily distinguish one Indian from another." If a Native person and a colonist met accidentally in the forest, the "Indian shall be bound immediately to throwe downe his Armes vpon call, and in case any Indian soe meeting an English man shall refuse to throwe downe his armes vpon Call he shall be deemed as an Enemy."

== History ==
In December 2020, the Council of the District of Columbia voted to honor the language of the treaty guaranteeing fishing rights to Native people by granting free fishing licences to members of the state-recognized Piscataway Indian Nation and Tayac Territory and Piscataway-Conoy Tribe of Maryland.

== See also ==
- 1652 Articles of Peace and Friendship
- Hunting license
- Land acknowledgement
- List of treaties
