= 1652 Articles of Peace and Friendship =

1652 treaty between Maryland and the Susquehannock people

The 1652 Articles of Peace and Friendship was a treaty signed on 5 July 1652 between the Province of Maryland and the Susquehannock people. The treaty resulted in the Susquehannock conceding the majority of the land from the mouth of the Susquehanna River into Maryland on both shores of the Chesapeake Bay. The treaty effectively signaled the end of Susquehannock life in Maryland.

== History ==
The parties to the treaty signed the document along the banks of the Severn River, near what is now Annapolis. The treaty was signed by five Susquehannock war chiefs whose names were spelled as Sawahegeh, Aurotaurogh, Scarhuhadih, Ruthcuhogah and Wathetdianeh. Richard Bennett, Thomas March, William Fuller, Leo Strong and Edward Lloyd were the signers for the colonial Maryland government. The Susquehannock were granted more men, cannons, and ammunition under the conditions of the treaty, in exchange for land. The treaty was signed at a time when Maryland was under Protestant control. The Susquehannock tribe were actively opposed to any form of Protestant or Catholic evangelizing measures.

The treaty was renewed in 1661. In 1675, the treaty was violated in an unprovoked attack by a joint force of troops from both Maryland and Virginia. John Washington, the great-grandfather of George Washington, was among them. The assault against the Susquehannock was a precursor to other events such as Bacon's Rebellion in Virginia.

While Susquehannock descendants still exist and are enrolled citizens of the Seneca–Cayuga Nation as well as some Haudenosaunee First Nations in Canada and the US, the Susquehannock are now extinct as a distinct people. There are efforts to push universities and other public institutions in the Baltimore area to institute land acknowledgement policies regarding the Susquehannock and other Native peoples of Maryland. A copy of the treaty on microfiche is held by the Maryland State Archives.

== See also ==
- 1666 Articles of Peace and Amity
- Land acknowledgement
- List of treaties
- Susquehannock
