= Recognition of EMS Personnel Licensure Interstate Compact - EMS Compact =

United States interstate compact

Recognition of EMS Personnel Licensure Interstate Compact
- Abbreviation: REPLICA
- Formation: October 11, 2017
- Type: Interstate compact
- Purpose: Multistate EMS personnel licensure recognition
- Region served: United States
- Members: 25 U.S. states
- Official language: English
- Chair: Kraig Kinney
- Executive Director: Donnie Woodyard Jr.
- Website: www.emscompact.gov

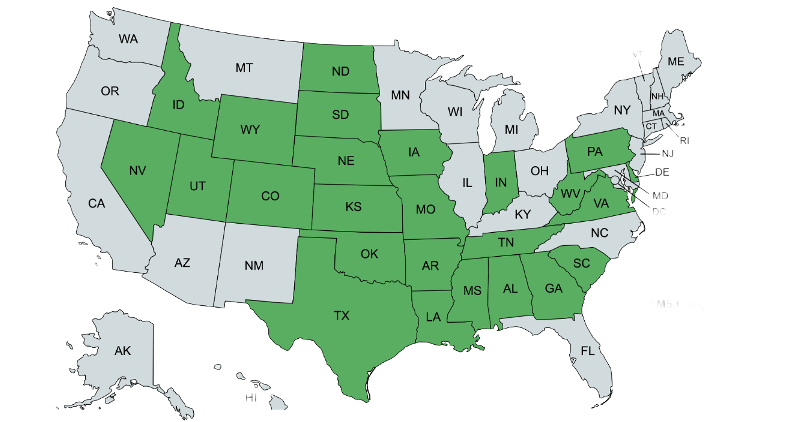
Map of the states that have enacted the Recognition of EMS Personnel Licensure Interstate Compact (EMS Compact) in the United States, current October 2025.

The United States EMS Compact, officially the Recognition of EMS Personnel Licensure Interstate Compact (REPLICA), is an interstate compact that enables day-to-day practice by licensed emergency medical services personnel across member state lines by recognizing a privilege to practice. The compact was formalized on October 11, 2017, when Georgia became the tenth state to enact the REPLICA model legislation, establishing the Interstate Commission for EMS Personnel Practice.

As of October 2025, 25 states have enacted the compact.

== Legal basis ==
The compact is grounded in Article I, Section 10, Clause 3 of the United States Constitution, known as the Compact Clause, which authorizes states to enter into agreements with other states with Congressional consent. In Virginia v. Tennessee (1893), the Supreme Court held that not all interstate compacts require explicit Congressional approval.

Interstate compacts are enacted as state law in each participating jurisdiction. The legal mechanism for the privilege to practice is established in Section 4(A) of the REPLICA model legislation.

== Governance ==
The compact establishes the Interstate Commission for EMS Personnel Practice, a multistate governmental entity composed of one gubernatorial appointee from each member state. The commission administers and enforces the compact's provisions, including rulemaking authority as provided by the compact and member state law.

The commission is recognized in federal interagency documents as playing a role in coordinating EMS workforce policy across state lines.

=== Composition and representation ===
Each member state's governor appoints one commissioner to represent the state, typically the senior executive branch official overseeing emergency medical services. Every state has equal representation with one vote per state on all matters before the commission.

As of October 2025, the chair is Kraig Kinney and the executive director is Donnie Woodyard Jr.

=== Authority and responsibilities ===
The commission's responsibilities include:

- Adopting administrative rules for compact implementation
- Overseeing compliance and enforcement among member states
- Managing the coordinated database for licensure and disciplinary information
- Resolving disputes between member states
- Conducting public meetings and soliciting public comment on proposed rules

The commission meets regularly throughout the year, with both virtual meetings and an annual in-person meeting.

== Leadership ==
The United States EMS Compact Commission is governed by an Executive Committee elected by the seated state commissioners. Since its formation in 2017, the Commission has been led by the following officers.

=== Chairpersons ===
- Kraig Kinney (Indiana) — July 1, 2023 – present
- Donnie Woodyard Jr. (Colorado) — October 22, 2022 – June 30, 2023
- Joseph Schmider (Texas) — October 7, 2017 – October 22, 2022
- Doug Wolfberg, JD — Inaugural Chair, October 7, 2017

=== Vice Chairpersons ===
- Wayne Denny — July 1, 2023 – present
- Kraig Kinney (Indiana) — November 2, 2022 – June 30, 2023
- Donnie Woodyard Jr. (Colorado) — September 18, 2020 – October 22, 2022
- Jeanne Marie Bakehouse (Colorado) — October 7, 2017 – September 18, 2020

=== Treasurers ===
- Brad Vande Lune (Iowa) — July 1, 2023 – present
- Wayne Denny (Idaho) — November 6, 2020 – July 2023
- Stephen Wilson (Alabama) — October 7, 2017 – October 2020

=== Secretaries ===
- Joseph House (Kansas) — April 3, 2020 – present
- Andy Gienapp (Wyoming) — October 7, 2017 – April 2020

=== Commissioners-at-Large ===
- Aaron Koehler (Wyoming) — June 2023 – present
- Aaron Rhone (Pennsylvania) — December 12, 2022 – June 2023
- Gary Brown (Virginia) — September 23, 2021 – December 2022
- Justin Romanello (New Hampshire) — June 16, 2020 – September 2021
- Donna G. Tidwell (Tennessee) — October 7, 2017 – June 2020
