= Title 18 of the Code of Federal Regulations =

U.S. federal rules and regulations on power and water conservation

CFR Title 18 – Conservation of Power and Water Resources is one of 50 titles composing the United States Code of Federal Regulations (CFR) and contains the principal set of rules and regulations issued by federal agencies regarding the conservation of power and water resources. It is available in digital and printed form and can be referenced online using the Electronic Code of Federal Regulations (e-CFR).

== Structure ==
The table of contents, as reflected in the e-CFR updated March 4, 2014, is as follows:

Volume	Chapter	Parts	Regulatory Entity
1	I	1-399	Federal Energy Regulatory Commission, Department of Energy
2	III	400-499	Delaware River Basin Commission
	VI	700-799	Water Resources Council
	VIII	800-899	Susquehanna River Basin Commission
	XIII	1300-1399	Tennessee Valley Authority
