= Phase Out Corporate Giveaways Interstate Compact =

Proposal to end economic development subsidies in the United States

The Phase Out Corporate Giveaways Interstate Compact is a proposed interstate compact in the United States that would commit signatory states to ending the economic development practice of providing targeted subsidies, tax abatements and other forms of financial incentives to private companies. It is frequently formally referred to as the "Agreement for Best Practices in Economic Development" in legislation.

As of November 2021, 15 states had bills before their legislatures that would bind them to the Compact's requirement not to offer subsidies to businesses located in other signatory states, and three other states had had such legislation introduced in previous sessions.

Versions of the Compact have been proposed by think tanks associated with free-market economic policies such as the Mercatus Center at George Mason University and the Mackinac Center for Public Policy. However, support for the Compact has been broadly bipartisan, with left-wing think tanks such as the American Economic Liberties Project also supporting the Compact and both Republican and Democratic legislators sponsoring bills to join the Compact in their states.

Legislators' statements and media reports generally suggest that interest in an interstate compact to end economic development "corporate welfare" was accelerated by the controversy surrounding the Amazon HQ2 bid process, by the subsidies given to Foxconn in Wisconsin and by a growing body of academic research questioning the effectiveness of such programs at creating jobs.

State legislation to join an interstate compact on economic development subsidies
State	Most Recent Session	Bill number(s)
Alabama	2021	HB367
Arizona	2021	SB1701
Connecticut	2021	HB6176
Delaware	2021	HB10
Florida	2021	HB983
Hawaii	2021	SB359; SB531; HB16
Illinois	2021	HB95; HB145; SB 674
Iowa	2021	HF598
Maryland	2020	HB525
Massachusetts	2021	HD4009
Michigan	2021	HB4971; SB524
Missouri	2019	HCR48
New Hampshire	2020	HB1132
New York	2021	A3718
Pennsylvania	2021	HB 873
Rhode Island	2021	S46; H5316
Utah	2021	SB190
West Virginia	2021	SB95
