= Wisconn Valley Science and Technology Park =

Technology manufacturing complex in Wisconsin

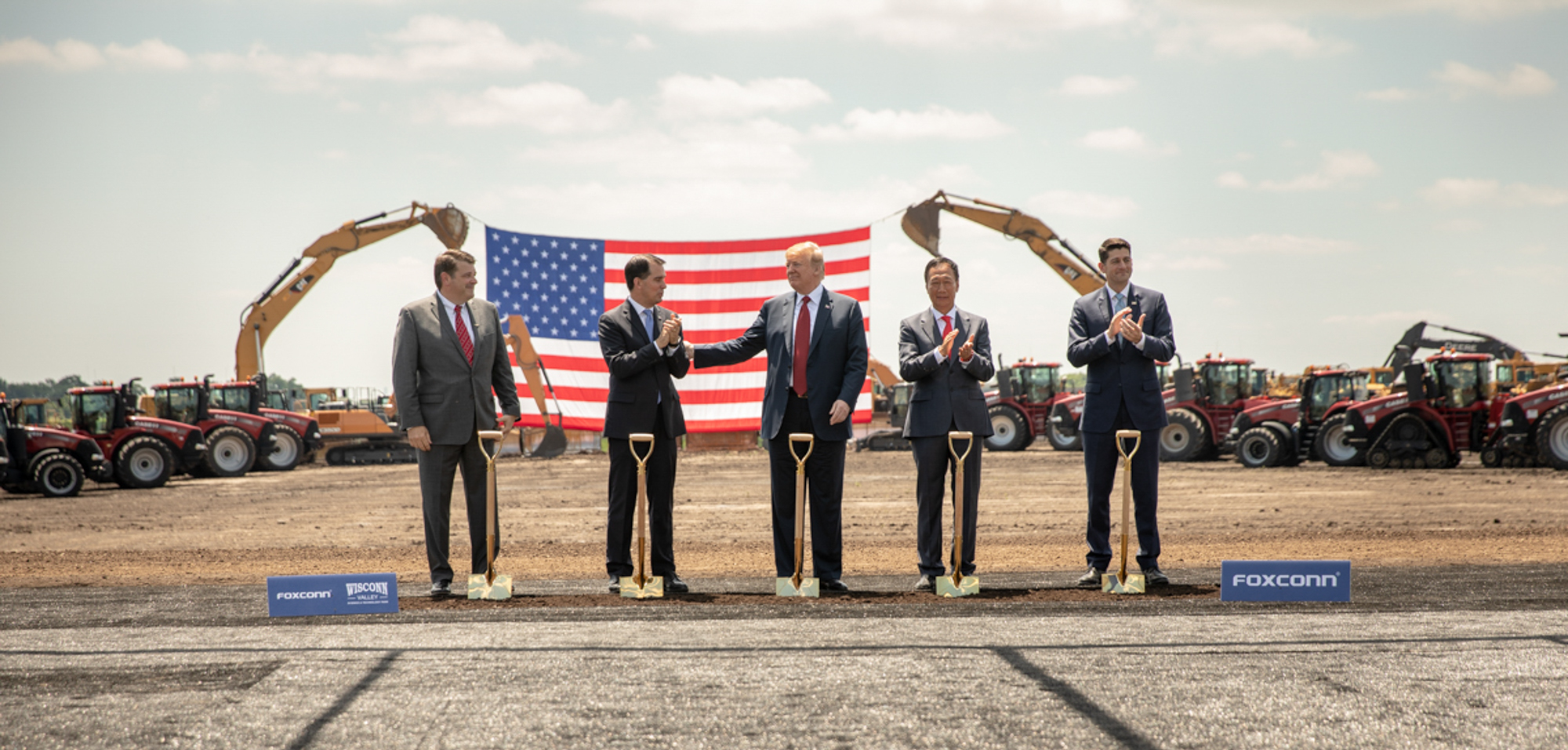
- Groundbreaking with Governor Walker, President Trump, Foxconn CEO Gou and House Speaker Paul Ryan
- Interactive map of Wisconn Valley Science and Technology Park
- Location: Mount Pleasant, Wisconsin, US
- Coordinates: 42°40′35″N 87°56′20″W
- Groundbreaking: June 28, 2018

Companies
- Developer: Foxconn
- Planner: Hammes Company
- Proposed: April 2017

The Wisconn Valley Science and Technology Park is a technology manufacturing complex located in Mount Pleasant, Wisconsin, US. It originated with an agreement between Foxconn and the state of Wisconsin for the company to invest $10 billion in a display panel manufacturing plant in Mount Pleasant. The initial announcement claimed that the site would employ up to 13,000 workers and that the company in return would receive $3 billion in subsidies. The factory was to start production by the end of 2020. State and local governments made substantial infrastructure improvements.

The plant was heavily touted by Governor Scott Walker and Republicans in Wisconsin. President Donald Trump praised the plant at the groundbreaking ceremony. Numerous economists expressed skepticism that the benefits to Wisconsin would exceed the costs of the deal for Wisconsin's taxpayers. The amount would have been by far the largest US tax incentive deal ever given to a foreign firm. Environmentalists criticized the deal for exempting the factory from Wisconsin's environmental rules, including being granted extensive water rights. Clearing the site involved the acquisition and demolition of houses through eminent domain.

Each year up until 2020, the state denied the project's tax subsidies since the project goals were not being met. Foxconn finally confirmed an alternative development plan with data center infrastructure and high-performance computing capabilities in November 2020. By January 2021, three structures had been built, a 120,000-square-foot storage facility (11,000 m^{2}), a 1 million-square-foot building (93,000 m^{2}) (intended for manufacturing but repurposed for storage), and a globe-shaped structure which will house a network operations center. In March 2021, they began making servers and other 5G networking gear for a handful of clients. Under a new agreement announced in April 2021, Foxconn reduced its planned investment to $672 million with 1,454 new jobs. Tax credits available to the project were reduced to $8 million.

In April 2023, Microsoft began purchasing sites within the project and began building a data center campus.

== Initial project agreement ==
The possible construction of a $7 billion factory in the United States that would employ as many as 50,000 people was discussed with reporters by Terry Gou, Foxconn founder and CEO, on January 22, 2017. He had earlier told Masayoshi Son, head of SoftBank Group Corp., that the U.S. has no panel-making industry but it is the second-largest market for televisions. By April, Gou had a meeting with Governor Scott Walker that had been arranged by the Trump administration. President Donald Trump had suggested southeastern Wisconsin to Gou after seeing a vacant industrial site on a helicopter flight with his chief of staff, Reince Priebus, earlier in April. Walker called a special session of the Wisconsin Legislature in July after signing a MOU with Gou. In November 2017, the Scott Walker administration in Wisconsin approved an agreement with the Taiwanese manufacturer Foxconn to build a plant in Racine County. Foxconn sought to locate a plant in the Great Lakes region, because it needed access to large amounts of water. The other Great Lakes states were not willing to offer as generous subsidies as Wisconsin. As part of the agreement, Foxconn was set to receive subsidies ranging from $3 billion to $4.8 billion (paid in increments if Foxconn met certain targets) over fifteen years. Had it been paid out, it would have been by far the largest subsidy ever given to a foreign firm in U.S. history. Much of this subsidy would be paid in direct cash payments from taxpayers since Wisconsin already exempts manufacturing companies from paying taxes. Foxconn said in return that it would set up a $10 billion factory that initially employed 3,000 (set to increase to 13,000 by as early as 2022).

Numerous economists expressed skepticism that the benefits would exceed the costs of the deal. Wisconsin's nonpartisan Legislative Fiscal Bureau estimated that the Foxconn plant investment would not break even until 2043, and that was in the best-case scenario. Others noted that Foxconn had in the past made similar claims about job creation in various localities which did not turn out to be true. Also Wisconsin does not have any of the crucial suppliers needed for flat-panel display production located nearby.

Initially, the subsidies were set at $3 billion, which would have cost the state $231,000 per job created (under the assumption of 13,000 jobs). The cost of the subsidies were higher than yearly state funding for the University of Wisconsin system and the state prisons. Other estimates of the subsidies go as high as $4.8 billion, which meant that the cost of the subsidy per job (assuming 13,000 jobs) was more than $346,000. Depending on how many jobs were created, the cost per job would have gone as high as more than a million dollars. This contrasts to an average subsidy in the US of around $24,000 per job.

Walker exempted the firm from Wisconsin's environmental rules regarding wetlands and streams. Walker and the Trump administration rolled back air pollution limits in the area of the plant, overruling objections of Environmental Protection Agency staff. The rules regarding limits would have required Foxconn to install more effective pollution-control equipment, scale back production or make emissions-trading agreements with cleaner facilities. The plant was estimated to contribute significantly to air pollution in the region. Environmentalists criticized the decision to allow Foxconn to draw 7 million U.S. gallons (26 million liters) of water per day from Lake Michigan. Allegations that this was a bad deal for Wisconsin contributed to Walker losing his reelection bid in the 2018 Wisconsin gubernatorial election.

== Criteria fulfilment and new agreement ==
At the end of 2018, Foxconn did not qualify for $10 million in subsidies, as it created only 156 of the 260 jobs required under the agreement. In 2019, an audit found that Foxconn only employed 113 full-time workers of the 189 workers claimed met the criteria in the contract. In 2020, the Wisconsin Economic Development Corp. (WEDC) determined Foxconn would not receive tax credits for work done in 2019, saying it hired only 281 tax-eligible employees, did not carry out the Gen 10.5 LCD project, and only made $300 million in capital expenditures. The company countered by claiming it hired more than the minimum for tax credits of 520 eligible full-time workers and that it had invested $750 million. WEDC did not expect Foxconn to fulfill its compliance with the state agreement to qualify for fiscal years 2021 through 2023 according to the budget prepared by the Wisconsin Department of Administration. Discussions were held on negotiating the contract but reaching a new agreement was a slow process. Under a new six-year agreement announced in April 2021, Foxconn reduced its planned investment to $672 million with 1,454 new jobs. Tax credits available for the project were reduced to $8 million. The new agreement, in line with those available to any company, had no specific requirement on what Foxconn will make. The changes in the project scope in the new agreement provides flexibility for Foxconn in using their facilities. For 2020, up to $29.1 million in tax credits could be received by the company with the hiring of at least 601 full-time workers along with certain capital investment requirements. The company met sufficient job creation and investment benchmarks in 2020 and qualified for the tax credits from the state according to WEDC's determination in December 2021.

== Land acquisition and infrastructure improvements ==
The Wisconn Valley Science and Technology Park was established to provide a site for the Foxconn campus and factory in Mount Pleasant. The area was declared "blighted" and was designated a redevelopment area in order to take all the private properties deemed necessary for the project. The roughly 4 square miles (10 km^{2}) of land necessary for the site was in part made possible by forcing property owners to sell at a fixed price under the threat of seizing the land under eminent domain. Hundreds of residents were moved out of their homes and family farms. Under state law, a municipality may take and demolish properties if it determines a property to be blighted and thus make way for redevelopment.

Mount Pleasant and Racine County made substantial upfront investments in infrastructure and land acquisition for the project since 2017. Acquiring the property necessary for public infrastructure improvements also involved the use of eminent domain after they were unable to reach voluntary agreements with property owners. The village's credit rating was downgraded over its Foxconn debt in 2018. Funding and property tax revenue from Foxconn and other businesses in the district are being used to pay back these costs over 30 years. A tax-increment financing district (TID No. 5) was formed in 2017 to pay for a $764 million investment to support the project at the local and regional levels. This was later increased to $911 million. Major contracts for the utilities, roadways and other infrastructure were let in March 2019. Substantial upgrades were made to the town water, sewage and electric systems for the project. The tax-increment financing district was designed to include other projects besides Foxconn. The Enterprise West Business Park began construction of two warehouse buildings in 2021.

Officials from the Village of Mount Pleasant and Racine County said Foxconn Technology Group "continues to fulfill all of its financial obligations under the local development agreement and is already the largest taxpayer" in both municipalities according to a February 2021 joint statement. Foxconn initially paid $5 million a year in property taxes. The 2023 increased payment of about $36 million will continue until 2047.

== Foxconn construction and manufacturing ==
At the groundbreaking in June 2018, President Trump praised the plant, describing it as "the Eighth Wonder of the World". The Wisconsin state legislature granted Foxconn special legal privileges within the Wisconsin judicial system. In 2018, the Walker administration shifted up to $90 million in local road funding to road work related to the Foxconn factory. The state spent $252 million on widening a portion of I-94 from six to eight lanes in anticipation of the increased traffic generated by the project.

In January 2019, Foxconn said it was reconsidering its initial plans to manufacture LCD screens at the Wisconsin plant, citing high labor costs in the United States, and that it would hire mostly engineers and researchers, rather than manufacturing workforce. In February 2019, Bloomberg News reported that the plant was "unlikely to ever employ 13,000 workers." In an interview in July 2019, Governor Tony Evers said that Foxconn told him the factory would open by May 2020, but would employ only 1,500 workers. In January 2020, Foxconn's founder Terry Gou insisted the factory would be operational within 2020. A 120,000-square-foot storage facility (11,000 m^{2}) was built in 2018 intended to be a "Smart Manufacturing Center". Construction continued in 2019 with a 1-million-square-foot building (93,000 m^{2}) referred to as a "advanced manufacturing" facility by Foxconn though they have permission to use it for storage also. The company says the approximately 100-foot-tall (30 m) "High Performance Computing Data Center globe" under construction will house a network operations center. The center is not part of the original agreement with the state.

The COVID-19 pandemic impacted the technology industry with workers temporarily working from home. In April 2020, Foxconn announced plans to make respirators in partnership with Medtronic at the Wisconsin plant. That relationship ended by November. Around the same time on April, Foxconn also began assembling procedural masks in Mount Pleasant under the Sharp brand.

Foxconn confirmed the development of data center infrastructure and high-performance computing capabilities in November 2020 in response to unconfirmed reports that key components for Google servers would be assembled here. In March 2021, they began making servers and other 5G networking gear for a handful of clients, including Cisco Systems.

Young Liu took over as Foxconn chairman after Gou left. Lui said in March 2021 that he “need[s] to find a product that fits that location” just before a new scaled-down agreement was reached in April. An official involved in the new agreement stated that the Foxconn campus would be used “for the manufacturing of data infrastructure and other operations related to high-performance computing, cloud computing, and artificial intelligence”. The 2021 revised agreement provided the flexibility needed by Foxconn as a largely contract manufacturer. A deal between Foxconn Technology Group and Fisker to build electric cars was made in February 2021. While there was initial speculation that cars could be built at the industrial park and a site visit by Henrik Fisker, Foxconn purchased the former GM plant in Ohio from electric automaker Lordstown Motors. While Racine County residents and some politicians say they are unclear as to what type of work is being done at the site, a statement issued by the Village of Mount Pleasant on October 7 stated, "As Racine County’s largest taxpayer, Foxconn is an important partner to the Village of Mount Pleasant and Racine County". Foxconn purchased additional property in late 2024 without announcing any development proposals.

As of 2023, two of the three buildings that were built as part of this initiative were empty and placed on sale by Foxconn. The two buildings that went up for sale were the 1 million-square-foot Advanced Display Technology Factory, which had been left unused since 2021, and a 120,000-square-foot building that was part of the park’s initial development phase.

== Other Foxconn initiatives ==
Innovation centers were announced for 611 E. Wisconsin Ave. in Milwaukee, the six-story WaterMark Building at 301 N. Washington St. in downtown Green Bay, Haymarket Landing at 220 Eau Claire St. in Eau Claire, 1 Main St. in downtown Racine and 1 W. Main St. in Madison. Foxconn purchased buildings in these cities but reported and observed construction appears to be mainly updates to the building systems rather than office improvements. These buildings are included in the $900 million Foxconn has invested in Wisconsin between 2017 and 2021. In 2021, Foxconn made their properties in Racine and Eau Claire available for lease. In a statement regarding the downtown Racine property, Foxconn said, "Our hope is that this decision will add to the vibrancy of the downtown community.” The Green Bay office building also has some tenants.

Foxconn signed agreements with University of Wisconsin–Madison and University of Wisconsin–Milwaukee. The Haymarket Landing, a residence hall with private business space in downtown Eau Claire, was expected to be a place students could work.

== Microsoft data center campus ==
The village board of Mount Pleasant voted in April 2023 to allow Microsoft to build a data center campus. Some of the $50 million Microsoft is paying for the land will be used to reimburse Foxconn for releasing its rights to the 315-acre parcel (127 ha). The Village will also pay down some of the debt it previously took on to prepare the site for Foxconn. As the parcel is within a tax-increment financing district, Microsoft would be eligible to recoup up to $5 million annually on 42% of property taxes paid on new construction. Power was available from WEC Energy Group as they had planned for the needs of the original Foxconn project. Construction started on buildings expected to be valued at about $1 billion. Microsoft is expected to finish the first phase of the data center campus in 2025.

== See also ==
- Corporate welfare
