= Susquehanna River Basin Commission =

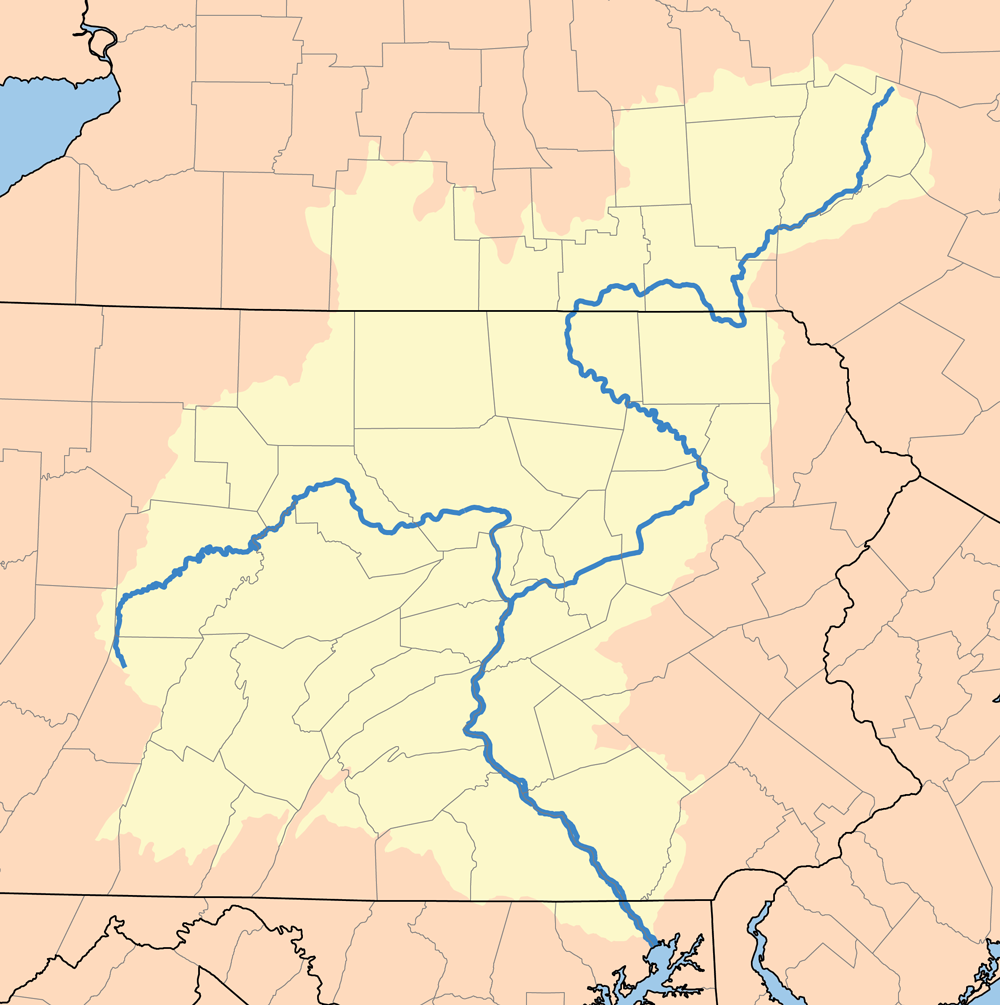
Susquehanna watershed

The Susquehanna River Basin Commission (SRBC) is a federal-interstate compact commission created by the Susquehanna River Basin Compact (Pub. L. 91-575) between three U.S. states: (Pennsylvania, New York, and Maryland), and the federal government, and signed into law by President Richard Nixon on Christmas Eve 1970 to be effective 30 days later on January 23, 1971.

== Compact ==
In the late 1960s, a broad group of concerned citizens recognized the need for a federal-interstate coordinating agency to lead the conservation, development, and administration of the basin's resources, thereby preserving and enhancing the basin's value as a scenic and recreational asset for its residents. The need to coordinate these efforts, along with those of three states and federal agencies, led to the drafting of the Susquehanna River Basin Compact, which was signed into law on December 24, 1970. The compact, as adopted by the Congress of the United States, and the legislatures of New York State, Pennsylvania, and Maryland, provides the mechanism to guide water resource management of the Susquehanna River Basin.

== Membership ==
State membership on the commission includes the governors of the three participating states or their designees. Under Pub. L. 110–114, the federal member is ex officio the Commander, North Atlantic Division, U.S. Army Corps of Engineers. The members appoint alternate members to serve in their place. As of August 2018, Major General Jeffrey L. Milhorn is the federal member of the commission. Secretary Ben Grumbles is the member from Maryland, and Basil Seggos is the member from New York. Secretary Patrick McDonnell is a member from the Commonwealth of Pennsylvania.

Major General Jeffrey L. Milhorn also serves as the United States Member of the Delaware River Basin Commission under the authority of Pub. L. 110–114.

The commission's appointed members do periodically change. Here is the most current member list.

== Purpose and activities ==
The purpose of the SRBC is to manage the water resources of the Susquehanna River in accordance with comprehensive planning principles through its own programs and by coordinating the efforts of the three states and the federal government. These program efforts include implementation of structural and nonstructural flood mitigation projects, regulation of water withdrawals and consumptive use, allocation of water resources among the member states, restoration and preservation of fisheries and wetlands, protection of future water supply (including availability of flows into the Chesapeake Bay), and protection of water quality.

Commission staff develops and implements the programs as directed by the commissioners and as found in the commission's comprehensive plan. The six priority management areas of the Comprehensive Plan are listed below, along with desired results.

Sustainable Water Development: To regulate and plan for water resources development in a manner that maintains economic viability, protects instream users, and ensures ecological diversity, and that meets the immediate and future needs of the basin's people for domestic, municipal, commercial, agricultural, and industrial water supply and recreational activities.

Water Quality: To support the existing and designated uses of all water bodies by achieving water quality that meets or exceeds standards.

Flooding: To prevent loss of life and significantly reduce future damage from floods within the basin through an integrated system of structural and nonstructural flood damage reduction measures.

Ecosystems: To achieve healthy ecosystems that provide groundwater and surface water of sufficient quality and in adequate supply to support abundant and diverse populations of aquatic, riparian, and terrestrial organisms, as well as human use.

Chesapeake Bay: To manage the water resources of the Susquehanna River Basin to assist in restoring and maintaining the Chesapeake Bay so it meets or exceeds applicable water quality standards and supports healthy populations of living resources, including oysters, crabs, fish, waterfowl, shore birds, and underwater grasses.

Coordination, Cooperation and Public Information: To maximize available human resources and achieve common and complementary management objectives by the commission, its member jurisdictions and others; to promote the planning and management of the basin's water resources in the most efficient manner possible; to inform the public on the commission's water management responsibilities; and to enhance the public's access to Commission information and in commenting on Commission activities.

== Program areas ==
The commission completes much of its work through four program areas. These programs include:

Project Review – the permitting arm of the commission's regulatory program, the Project Review team receives and reviews applications for water withdrawals and consumptive water use, makes recommendations to the commissioners for actions on those applications, and helps to develop key standards guiding how, when, and where the commission's policies and regulations are exercised.

Compliance and Enforcement – the enforcement arm of the commission's regulatory program, the Compliance Program works to ensure that water-related projects have the appropriate approvals and operate within the constraints of those approvals. Site inspections, quarterly reporting requirements, and an extensive project database are some of the essential tools used by the program.

Monitoring & Protection - Monitoring and Protection scientists collect data to better understand the interactions of biological, chemical, and physical traits of streams throughout the basin. These activities include water quality monitoring/sampling for macroinvertebrates & fish, stormwater, nutrient and sediment loadings, and abandoned mine drainage. Key protection efforts include operating systems that provide real-time monitoring in sensitive watersheds and in the vicinity of drinking water supplies, establishing Total Maximum Daily Load criteria, assessing risks to drinking water sources, and characterizing the causes and extent of impairment to Basin waterways.

Planning & Operations – Planning and Operations provides technical support to the other programs and is tasked with assessing the nature and quantity of water use in the basin. The Planning and Operations team also leads coordination efforts to ensure that Basin agencies and residents are prepared to withstand and respond to flooding and drought.

== Controversy ==
In 2012 the commission attracted protests by approving the extraction of water for use in fracking, an activity whose opponents claim causes earthquakes, creategroundwaterer pollution and contributes to global warming.

This water extraction involved the owner selling a mobile home park to Aqua America, which had obtained the commission's permission to withdraw up to 3 million gallons of water per day from the Susquehanna at that site. Aqua America then evicted the occupants to build a pumping station on the site, attracting further protests from residents and their supporters.

The sale of the property, not the commission's approval, triggered the eviction under a local ordinance governing the mobile home park's operation in a floodplain.

== See also ==
- Title 18 of the Code of Federal Regulations
- Colorado River Compact
- Columbia River Gorge Commission
- Connecticut River Valley Flood Control Commission
- Delaware River Basin Commission
- Interstate Commission on the Potomac River Basin
- Red River Compact Commission
