= Emergency Management Assistance Compact =

Mutual aid agreement between states and territories of the US

Emergency Management Assistance Compact (EMAC)
- Formation: 1996
- Type: Interstate compact
- Headquarters: Administered by the National Emergency Management Association
- Location: Lexington, Kentucky
- Members: All U.S. states, District of Columbia, U.S. Virgin Islands, Puerto Rico, and Guam
- Website: emacweb.org

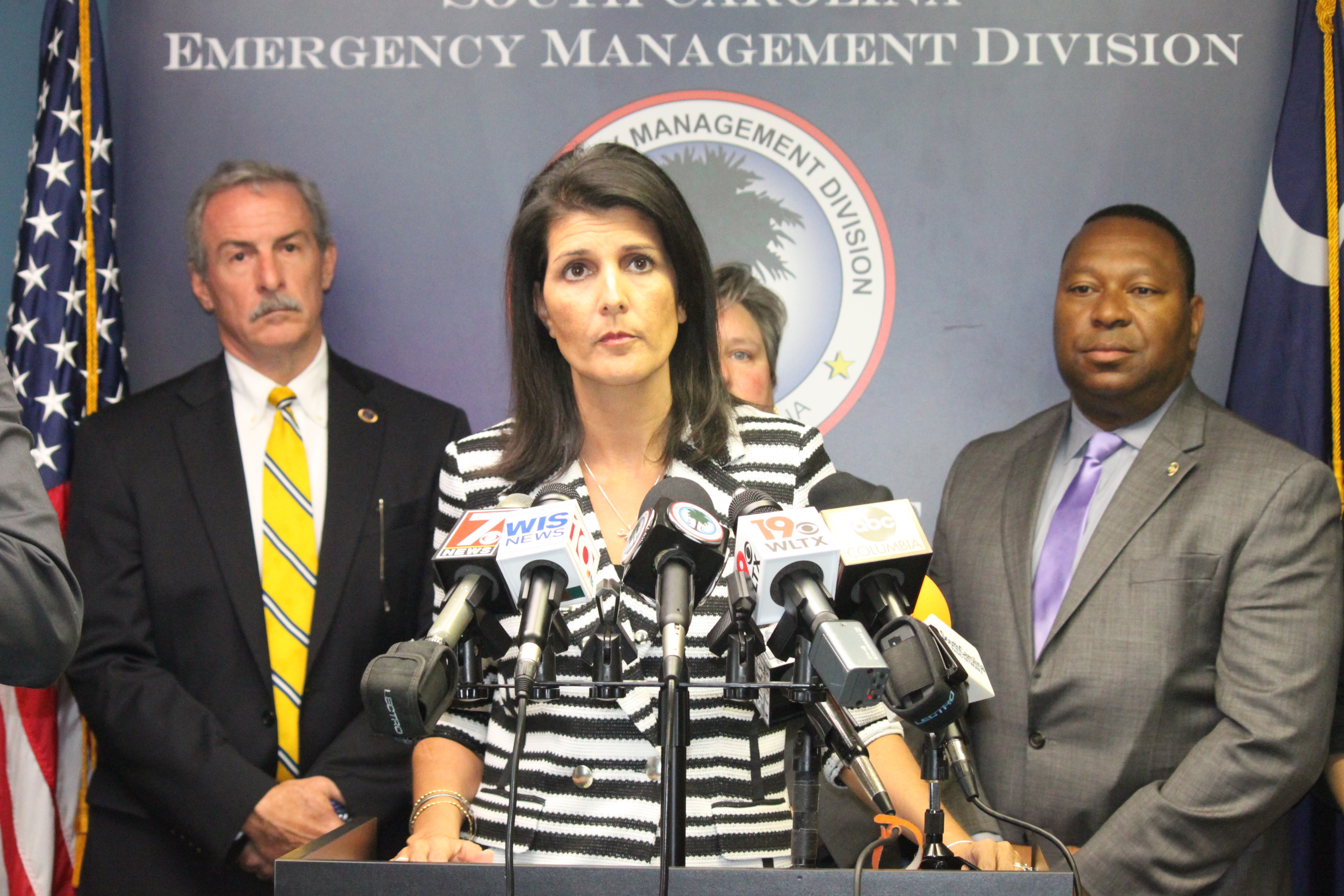
South Carolina Governor Nikki Haley declares state of emergency for Hurricane Matthew. Through the Emergency Management Assistance Compact (EMAC), 10 states supported South Carolina's disaster response.

The Emergency Management Assistance Compact (EMAC) is a mutual aid agreement among states and territories of the United States. It enables states to share resources during natural and man-made disasters, including terrorist attacks.

EMAC complements the national disaster response system. EMAC is used alongside federal assistance or when federal assistance is not warranted. EMAC facilitates the maximum use of all available resources within member states' inventories.

== How it works ==
EMAC is administered by the National Emergency Management Association (NEMA), which provides the day-to-day support and technical backbone for EMAC education and operations at its headquarters in Lexington, Kentucky. The main contact for agencies, organizations, and the private sector to learn more about EMAC is the state emergency management agencies.

When responding to a disaster, EMAC works as follows.

=== Requesting assistance ===
To activate EMAC, the governor of the affected state or territory must formally declare a state of emergency. The state must also have, or anticipate receiving, funds sufficient to reimburse for resources provided by other states. The next steps are the responsibility of the state emergency management director: listing the resources needed, including personnel and equipment; contacting EMAC; and contacting other states in reference to specific identified resources. An EMAC Advance Team (A-Team) will typically be deployed to help with needs assessment and preparation of the request. The requisition will then be broadcast to other states. At all times, affected states retain the option of seeking resource support from other states, the federal government, or both, as determined by the size of the disaster event. The emergency management director in the assisting state also has obligations to provide a timely response communicating the availability of resources.

=== Providing assistance ===
Assisting states that commit to an agreement then mobilize and deploy the agreed-upon resources (personnel or equipment) to the affected state. Some examples of typical resources provided are mobile command vehicles, public assistance teams, and temporary shelters. Other specialized resources may only be available from a few states, such as cargo aircraft, donations management teams, and technical rescue teams. Once the mission is completed, the resources are demobilized and redeployed to their home states.

=== Reimbursement ===
Deployed personnel provide receipts and records to their home state to develop a reimbursement package, which is then sent to the affected state, which then reimburses the assisting state.

== History ==
=== Law ===
Before EMAC, disaster response cooperation among states was governed by the Interstate Civil Defense and Disaster Compact, which 22 states and the District of Columbia joined after passage of the Federal Civil Defense Act of 1950. EMAC has its origins in the Southern Regional Emergency Management Assistance Compact (SREMAC), which was proposed at the Southern Governors Association by former Florida Governor Lawton Chiles after 1992's Hurricane Andrew. Seventeen states, the U.S. Virgin Islands and Puerto Rico ratified the agreement in 1993. In 1995, the name was changed to Emergency Management Assistance Compact (EMAC), and any state or U.S. territory was allowed to join, and the National Emergency Management Association replaced the Southern Governors Association as administrator.

In 1996, the 104th U.S. Congress passed Public Law 104 - 321, the Joint resolution granting the consent of Congress to the Emergency Management Assistance Compact, as required by the Compact Clause of the U.S. Constitution for some compacts between states. To become a member of EMAC, each state or territory legislature must have passed legislation which was signed into law, adopting the standard language. By 1995, all states except California and Hawaii had ratified EMAC, although some states took longer to pass the legislation. Since at least 2003, all U.S. states, the District of Columbia, U.S. Virgin Islands, Puerto Rico, and Guam are members of EMAC. California joined in 2005 and Hawaii in 2006. The Commonwealth of the Northern Mariana Islands joined in 2019. American Samoa is eligible to join but is not a member as of 2026.

=== Application ===
In 1995, EMAC was activated to respond to damage from Hurricane Opal in Florida, in one of the first major tests of the compact. There had already been some smaller applications of SREMAC, such as responding to severe winter weather in Tennessee in early 1994, to flooding in Georgia in mid-1994, and to forest fires in Kentucky in spring 1995.

EMAC response to the terrorist attacks of September 11, 2001 prompted some remaining states, including New York and New Jersey, to pass EMAC legislation. Awareness of EMAC implementation also increased nationwide.

2003 was the first year a full-time program coordinator was employed to administer EMAC.

In 2004, EMAC was utilized during the response to Hurricanes Charley, Frances, Ivan, and Jeanne. Through EMAC, more than 800 state and local personnel from 38 states (including California, which was not an EMAC member at that time) were deployed to Florida, Alabama, and West Virginia. The cost was approximately $15 million in personnel, equipment, and National Guard expenditures.

The response to Hurricanes Katrina and Rita was one of the most significant EMAC activations. More than 65,000 personnel from 48 states, the District of Columbia, Puerto Rico, and the U.S. Virgin Islands were deployed under EMAC through the state emergency management agencies. Total costs for the 2005 EMAC events were expected to exceed $840 million. A review of after-action reports concluded that, while EMAC played a significant and effective role in response to these hurricanes, Mississippi was more effective than Louisiana in making use of EMAC. The analysis attributes this difference to factors like Louisiana lacking an intrastate mutual aid system, a delay in declaring a state of emergency by Governor Kathleen Blanco, and assistance in navigating the process that Florida Governor Jeb Bush provided to Mississippi Governor Haley Barbour. In total, EMAC was activated ten times in 2005, in response to one wildfire, one flood, one tropical storm, two winter storms, and five hurricanes.

The COVID-19 pandemic presented a unique challenge, as all EMAC member states and territories were under a state of emergency at the same time. Nevertheless, EMAC was used to distribute supplies to areas where they were needed.

In 2023, EMAC was utilized by Texas to request support from other states to help interdict drug and human trafficking near the Texas-Mexico Border under Operation Lone Star. In response, 14 other states sent National Guard and other personnel to participate in Operation Lone Star.

== Benefits ==
EMAC was developed to eliminate legal and administrative obstacles to interstate mutual aid such as licensing, permits, liability, and reimbursement.

Additionally, EMAC has had broader impacts on emergency preparedness and response.

- Improved intrastate cooperation in emergency response by serving as the basis for NEMA's Model Intrastate Mutual Aid Legislation. The number of states with intrastate mutual aid legislation increased from 10 in 2004 to 44 in 2020.
- Contributed to the development of a framework for the private sector to participate in mutual aid efforts. The number of states with policies addressing private sector participation increased from 6 in 2014 to 18 in 2020.
- Progressed toward the goal of a mutual aid network including all of North America by contributing to the development of compacts between U.S. states and Canadian provinces, which were then consolidated into the Northern Emergency Management Assistance Compact (NEMAC).
- Integrating state resources and mutual aid principles into national preparedness as reflected in the National Response Framework.

== Limitations ==
EMAC applies only during the time period that a disaster is declared in the state requesting assistance. Also, EMAC does not resolve questions that arise when different states have different standards for governmental immunity.
