= Gulf States Marine Fisheries Commission =

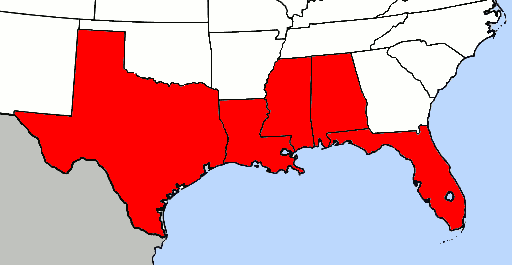
Members of the Gulf States Marine Fisheries Commission: (left to right) Texas, Louisiana, Mississippi, Alabama and Florida

The Gulf States Marine Fisheries Commission (GSMFC) is an interstate compact among the five U.S. states that border the Gulf of Mexico: Alabama, Florida, Louisiana, Mississippi and Texas. Its purpose is to promote the conservation, development, and utilization of the fishery resources of the Gulf.

The GSMFC was created on July 16, 1949, and is headquartered in Ocean Springs, Mississippi.
