= Interstate Wildlife Violator Compact =

Information-sharing agreement among US states

- Abbreviation: IWVC
- Formation: 1989
- Type: Interstate compact
- Purpose: Wildlife law enforcement reciprocity
- Members: 50 states

The Interstate Wildlife Violator Compact (IWVC) is a United States interstate compact (an agreement among participating states) that provides for the reciprocal sharing of information regarding sportsmen's fishing, hunting, and trapping violations. The compact allows for recognition of suspensions or revocations of hunting, fishing, and trapping licenses and permits in other member states resulting from violations of hunting, fishing, and trapping laws, to prevent poaching across state lines. As of 2025, all 50 US states are members of the compact.

Illegal activities in one state can thus affect a person's hunting or fishing privileges in all member states. The IWVC obligates members to report wildlife violation convictions to other Compact members, enables members to honor each other's suspensions, and provides a mechanism for exchanging violator data between member states. A conviction in one Compact member state may cause them to be barred from participating in hunting, fishing, and trapping in all member states, at the discretion of each state.

== History ==
The concept of a wildlife violator compact was first advanced in the early 1980s by member states in the Western Association of Fish and Wildlife Agencies. Law enforcement administrators and Wildlife Commissioners from several states began discussing the idea of a compact modeled on the formats of the existing Driver License Compact and Non-Resident Violator Compacts, both of which relate to motor vehicle operator licensing and enforcement.

In 1985, draft compacts were developed independently in Colorado and Nevada. Subsequently, these drafts were merged, and the Interstate Wildlife Violator Compact was created. During the 1989 Legislative session, compact legislation was passed into law in Colorado, Nevada, and Oregon. These three states formed the nucleus of the compact.

States followed the process below to join the Compact:

1. Passed legislation to join (incorporating the compact directly into the state's statutes or authorized the state wildlife agency to join).

2. Agency adopted regulations to implement Compact membership. States communicate suspensions with each other using the Compact database, which stores revocation information.

3. Paid an annual fee for access to the database. Entering violators into the compact and ratifying other states' suspensions requires a minor time commitment, and this responsibility is usually carried out by existing agency personnel.

With Massachusetts as the last state to join, in 2022, all 50 states are now members of the Compact.

== Policy rationale ==
The compact establishes reciprocity among member states for suspensions of hunting, fishing, and trapping licenses.

The compact aims to reduce illegal hunting and fishing, often referred to as poaching, by facilitating the sharing of information among states. Before the compact, someone could lose a license in one state and then get a license in another state to continue hunting or fishing. With the compact, wildlife violators will be held accountable for their actions across all participating states. The threat of not being able to hunt, fish, or trap in most states is intended to deter people from violating wildlife laws.

The Compact also streamlines the process for dealing with non-resident violators, conserving valuable state resources and enhancing service efficiency. There are fewer arrests because officers can cite and release non-residents, thereby reducing the burden on jail facilities and courts. In addition, since a non-resident offender is subject to license suspension in their home state for failure to comply with a citation, they have the same incentive to comply as a resident, reducing failure-to-appear cases.

== Implementation ==
=== Enforcement ===
In most instances, when a resident of a Compact state ("home state") commits a wildlife violation in another member state ("charging state"), the officer in the charging state can treat the non-resident violator as though they were a resident - issuing a citation and releasing them on personal recognizance. If the violator fails to comply with the citation, the charging state may request the violator's home state to suspend the violator's hunting privileges until the violator complies with the terms of the citation. If the violator is convicted, they will be entered into the Compact database. The home state and all member states may treat the conviction as though it occurred in their own state for purposes of license suspension.

If a person's license or permit privileges, which come under the scope of the compact, are suspended or revoked in one member state, they are subject to suspension or revocation in all member states. In addition to license and permit suspensions and revocations which result from a conviction for the illegal pursuit, possession, or taking of mammals, birds, fish, reptiles, amphibians, mollusks, shellfish, and crustaceans, failing to appear in court or to otherwise answer a ticket or summons issued for such violations will also result in license or permit suspension. Compact member states also agree to recognize convictions for violations within the scope of the compact that occur in all other member states and to apply them toward license and permit suspension and revocations in the state in which the person resides.

Conservation Police Officer employed by Virginia State Parks.

The Interstate Wildlife Violator Compact also establishes a process whereby wildlife law violations by a non-resident from a member state are handled as if the person were a resident, meaning they can be served a ticket rather than being arrested, booked, and bonded. This process is a convenience for hunters, anglers, and trappers in member states. It increases the efficiency of game wardens by allowing more time for enforcement duties rather than for processing violators.

Each member state honors all similar wildlife violation suspensions from other member states. This would include Failure to Appear in court violations. One benefit for wildlife violators is that, if they are from a member state, a game warden can issue a simple citation instead of taking them to jail and requiring them to post a cash bond. If a non-resident sportsman is issued a wildlife citation and fails to comply with the citation or appear in court, the Wildlife Agency of that state will notify their home state of a failure to comply. The home state will then suspend that person's resident hunting or fishing license. Once the person complies with the initial violation, their home state will be notified, and their resident license will be reinstated.

=== Resolving conflicts with state laws ===
The compact provides general procedures for enforcement agencies and courts to follow. A state can develop specific Compact procedures to comply with the legal and administrative requirements of that state, as long as the procedures comply with the intent of the compact. The compact does not affect the right of any participating state to apply any of its laws relating to license privileges to any person or circumstance. When the Compact conflicts with a state's laws, it remains in full force and effect within the state, except for the conflicting provision.

== Results ==
Between 2000 and 2010, the Compact resulted in the sharing and enforcement of penalties against 5,000 violators of wildlife laws.

Between 2012 and 2021, almost 60,000 violations were entered into the Compact's database. South Dakota had the most entries, with over 4,000, followed by Wisconsin and Pennsylvania with 3,600+ and 3,400+, respectively. In contrast, Delaware, Louisiana and Rhode Island each had only one entry during that time period.

== In popular culture ==
The member states of the Interstate Wildlife Violator Compact featured prominently in the television show The Poacher Chronicles. The show, hosted by Jim Solomon, was also featured on the Xplor the Outdoors radio network and ran monthly from approximately 1998 to 2010.
