= Interstate Commission on the Potomac River Basin =

Member states of the commission

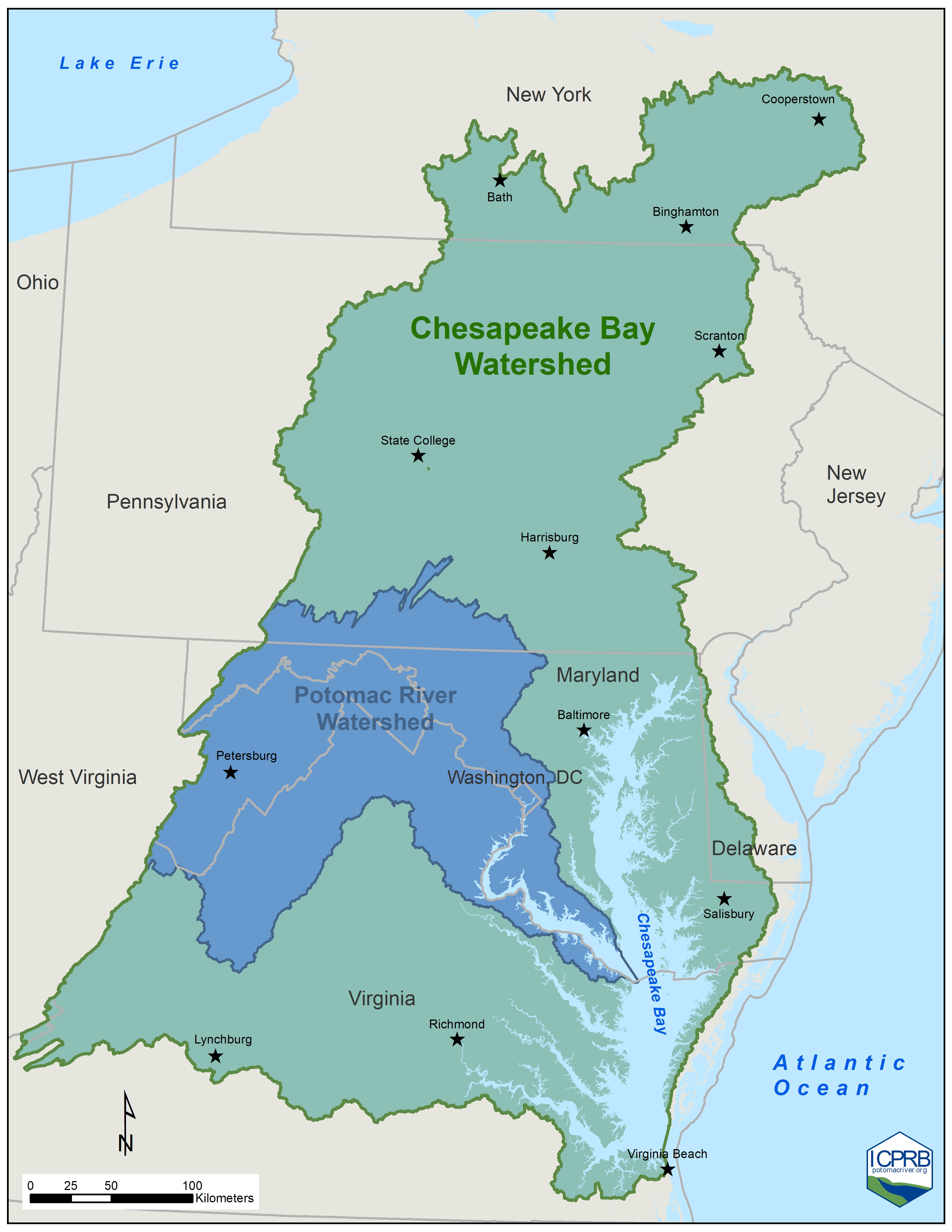
The Potomac basin within the Chesapeake Bay watershed.

The Interstate Commission on the Potomac River Basin (ICPRB) is an agency composed of commissioners representing the United States federal government, the states of Maryland, Pennsylvania, Virginia, West Virginia, and the District of Columbia. The ICPRB mission is to enhance, protect, and conserve the water and associated land resources of the Potomac River basin and its tributaries through regional and interstate cooperation.

It was one of the first organizations with a congressional mandate to consider water resources on a watershed basis, rather than along political boundaries.

== Authority ==
The Commission was created by an act of the United States Congress in 1940. Congress amended the law in 1970, creating an interstate compact.

== Mission ==
ICPRB accomplishes its mission through a variety of actions to conduct, coordinate, and cooperate in studies and programs in the areas of water quality, water supply, living resources, and land resources. The Section for Cooperative Water Supply Operations on the Potomac River ("Co-op"), a special section of the Commission, was created as a technical operations center for management and coordination among the regional utilities to avoid water supply shortages in the Washington metropolitan area during droughts. In 1978, the ICPRB established a "Low Flow Allocation Agreement" applicable during drought conditions to maintain environmental conditions on the river. The agreement was revised in 2018.

== Commissioners ==
The ICPRB Commissioners represent the Commonwealths of Pennsylvania and Virginia, the States of Maryland and West Virginia, the District of Columbia, and the Federal Government. These individuals, appointed by their respective jurisdictions, set policy and guide the Commission, as an interstate compact agency.

== Focus areas ==
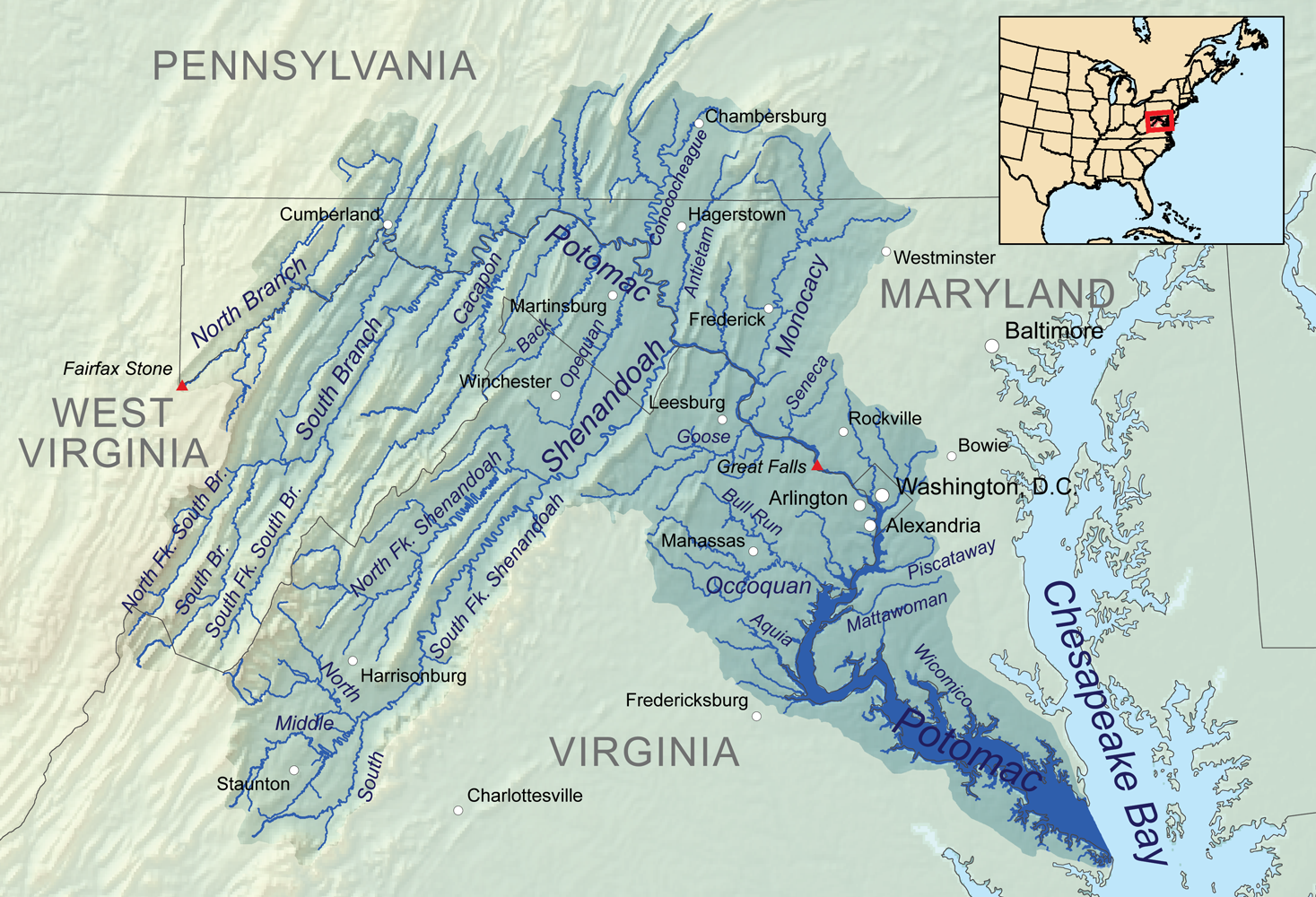
Potomac River watershed

Complementing the commissioners is a professional staff that has gained a strong reputation for delivering sound science and analysis, equipping decision-makers at various government levels with the facts and technical data to resolve issues concerning the watershed. The staff's efforts focus on four primary areas of involvement:

=== Drinking water and water resources ===
The staff's knowledge of drinking water and water resources is used to coordinate the water supply withdrawals of the three major metropolitan area water utilities that rely on Potomac River water for nearly 500 million US gallons (1.9 gigalitres) per day to meet the thirst of the capital region. Throughout the basin, project expertise includes:

- Water resources operations and supply modeling
- Population and demand forecasting
- Flood control and flood forecast systems
- Acid mine drainage abatement; passive treatment
- Drinking water assessments and source water protection studies
- River flow modeling and time of travel studies.
- Source water protection
- Groundwater
- Water supply planning

=== Water quality ===
Water quality issues addressed by Commission staff include supporting highly complex studies and projects that benefit both the Potomac basin and the Chesapeake Bay drainage, of which the basin is a major part. Working collaboratively with other organizations, staff develop ecosystem indicators and analysis that are consistent basin-wide. Project expertise includes:

- Aquatic habitat assessment/development
- Fisheries management and flow assessments
- Geographic information system-based data comparison
- Hazardous waste assessments
- Restoration of viable American shad and other fisheries populations
- Sediment transport modeling
- Stream assessments to determine impairments
- Total maximum daily load (TMDL) plans for watersheds
- Water quality modeling
- Wetlands assessment and restoration
- Zooplankton and phytoplankton assessments.

=== Communication and education ===
The agency's technical expertise is magnified by a communications program that extends the impacts and results of ICPRB's projects to the region's public. Work to protect and improve the region's resources can be effective only when the public is educated about the reasons for those actions and their role in preserving them. To that end, the Commission:

- Publishes newsletters and reports
- Maintains an informational website
- Responds to requests for information
- Reaches out to schools, citizen groups, and other organizations
- Coordinates watershed groups conducting stream cleanups.

== Cooperation and partnerships ==
The ICPRB works with numerous partners throughout the basin, leveraging cooperative skills to encourage multiple jurisdictions to coordinate actions on water resource issues. This brings to the watershed the needed action to address the basin's major challenges, including water quality impairments, water supply, flooding, groundwater use, and nonpoint source pollution. The Commission can conduct a range of surveys and assessments to increase knowledge of the ecosystem, enabling more efficient resource management.

== Regional facilitation ==
Given that the mainstem of the Potomac River forms interstate boundaries, a cooperative, non-regulatory regional organization is well-suited to facilitate solutions. In a basin of nearly 15,000 square miles (39,000 km^{2}), encompassing five principal political jurisdictions and more than five million residents who rely on its water for domestic, industrial, and agricultural purposes, a technically skilled agency must assist the multiple interests in solving water resources problems. With more than one million acres of federally owned or managed land in the basin, the federal government has an interest in the waters of the basin. An agency that provides for coordinated state and federal water resources management actions can accomplish this if properly supported. Such an agency exists in the Interstate Commission on the Potomac River Basin.

== Timeline of accomplishments ==
1940s - The Commission's first (1943) report on the condition of Potomac basin waters precipitates adoption of a pollution abatement program (1945), an intensive survey of industrial pollution (1946), and definition of a set of "Minimum Water Quality Criteria" (1946) by which Potomac streams and waterways may be judged suitable or unsuitable for several principal water uses. Concurrent with Congress enacting the first Federal Water Pollution Control Act (1948), ICPRB initiates a continuous water-quality sampling program in the basin. By 1949, ICPRB is credited with coordinating with local authorities to "radically" improve conditions on the Potomac's Shenandoah River tributary, which had recently been referred to as a "biological desert" due to pollution from industrial waste.

1950s - ICPRB issues a major report describing the polluted Washington area Potomac and publishes the results of a study it sponsored on North Branch industrial wastes (1954). Under the auspices of the ICPRB, a group of citizens organizes the Citizens Council for a Clean Potomac (1956). As the U.S. Public Health Service declares the Potomac River unsafe for swimming, ICPRB estimates that on average, 60 million cubic feet of sediment is deposited annually within the metropolitan Washington reach of the Potomac estuary (1957). Chairman Harold A. Kemp indicates that Potomac River pollution has reached a "critical condition" and that there is an urgent need for additional sewage treatment facilities. By 1958, ICPRB was gathering and tabulating information from about 85 stream sampling stations operated by cooperating agencies, municipalities, and industries. The following year, ICPRB publishes its first "Potomac River Water Quality Network," holds a "first-of-its-kind" silt-control conference, and sponsors a study of sediment sources in the basin with the U.S. Geological Survey.

1960s - In 1963, ICPRB issued two reports on sediment sources and an urban sediment control program.

1970s - ICPRB's Compact is amended in 1970, extending its authority to include water supply and water-related land use. In 1975, an ICPRB conference focused on rising dollar and energy costs associated with sewage treatment in the Washington, D.C., metro area. The Low Flow Allocation Agreement was established in 1978.

1980s - ICPRB initiates regional discussion of the problem posed by invasive aquatic weed, hydrilla (1983). After Maryland (1985) and the District of Columbia (1986) initiated a phosphate detergent ban, ICPRB recommended (1987) expanding such bans basin-wide.

1990s - Maryland, West Virginia and ICPRB sign (1993) cooperative agreement on program to restore water quality to the North Branch.

2000s– In 2001, the ICPRB combined decades of data into a consistent and usable format for researchers and those working on the watershed in the Tidal Potomac Integrative Analysis Project. In 2002, ICPRB's successful American Shad Restoration Project was completed, restoring the population of this historically significant fish that once flowed freely in the Potomac but had been decimated by pollution, overfishing, and blockage over the past century. In 2004, along with other partners in the basin, the Commission organized and led the formation of a voluntary partnership between water utilities and state and federal agencies known as the Potomac River Basin Drinking Water Source Protection Partnership, which will focus on protecting the water quality of the river as the source of drinking water for millions of people who live in the basin. ICPRB developed an index of stream health known as "Chessie BIBI" in 2008. The index is calculated from stream macroinvertebrate samples collected and counted by state, federal, and local agencies, as well as other groups.

2010s - In 2011, scientists at ICPRB conducted a survey of freshwater mussels in the mainstem of the river. These sensitive creatures are good indicators of a healthy waterway. Having baseline information can help determine the future shifts in water quality. The Potomac River Basin Comprehensive Water Resources Plan was adopted in 2018. The plan, updated in 2023, describes a shared vision for the basin, identifies water resource issues of interstate and/or basin-wide significance, and recommends actions to achieve the shared vision.

2020s - A 2024 ICPRB report warns of widespread public risks and costs if contamination, drought, or infrastructure damage compromises use of the Potomac River as a drinking water source.

== See also ==
- List of operating agencies created by interstate compact
