= Delaware River Basin Commission =

Logo

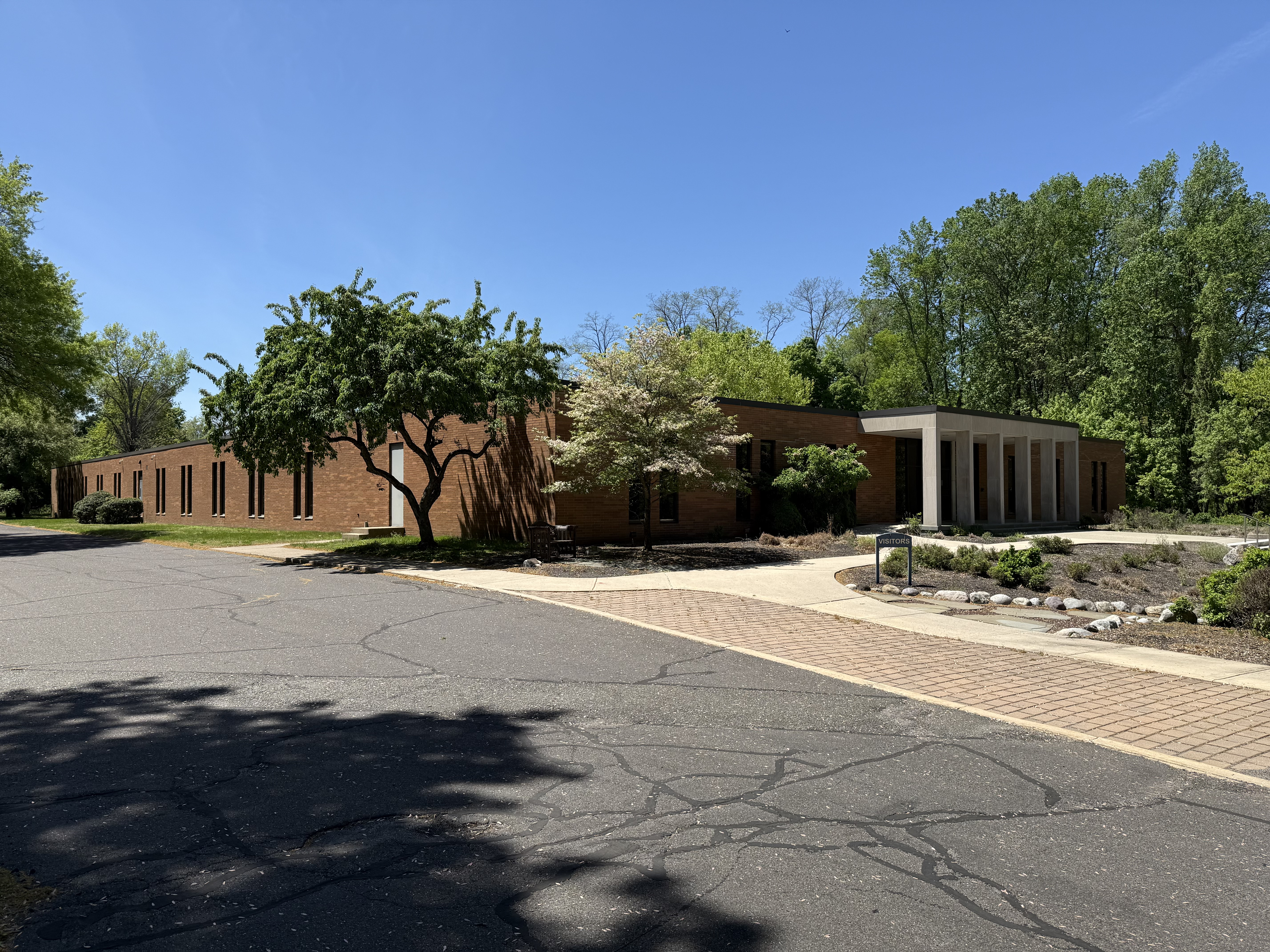
Headquarters in Ewing, New Jersey

Member states

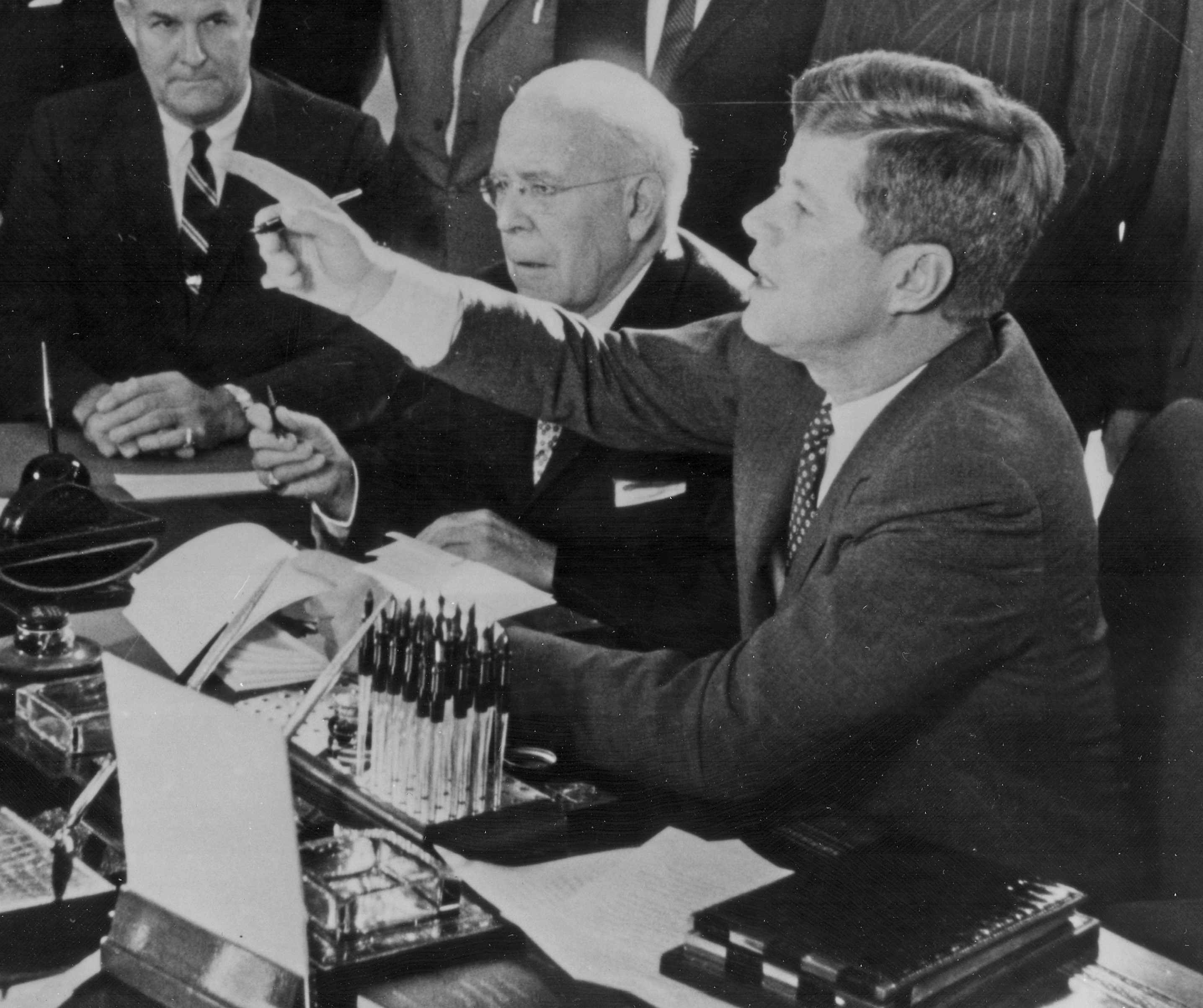
On Nov. 2, 1961, President John F. Kennedy and the governors of Delaware, Pennsylvania, New Jersey and New York signed the Delaware River Basin Compact at ceremony in the White House's Oval Office. This created the Delaware River Basin Commission.

The Delaware River Basin Commission (DRBC) is a United States government agency created in 1961 by an interstate compact, signed into law by President John F. Kennedy, between four states (Pennsylvania, Delaware, New Jersey, and New York). The headquarters building for the commission is adjacent to the New Jersey State Police headquarters in the West Trenton section of Ewing Township, New Jersey.

== Purpose and activities ==
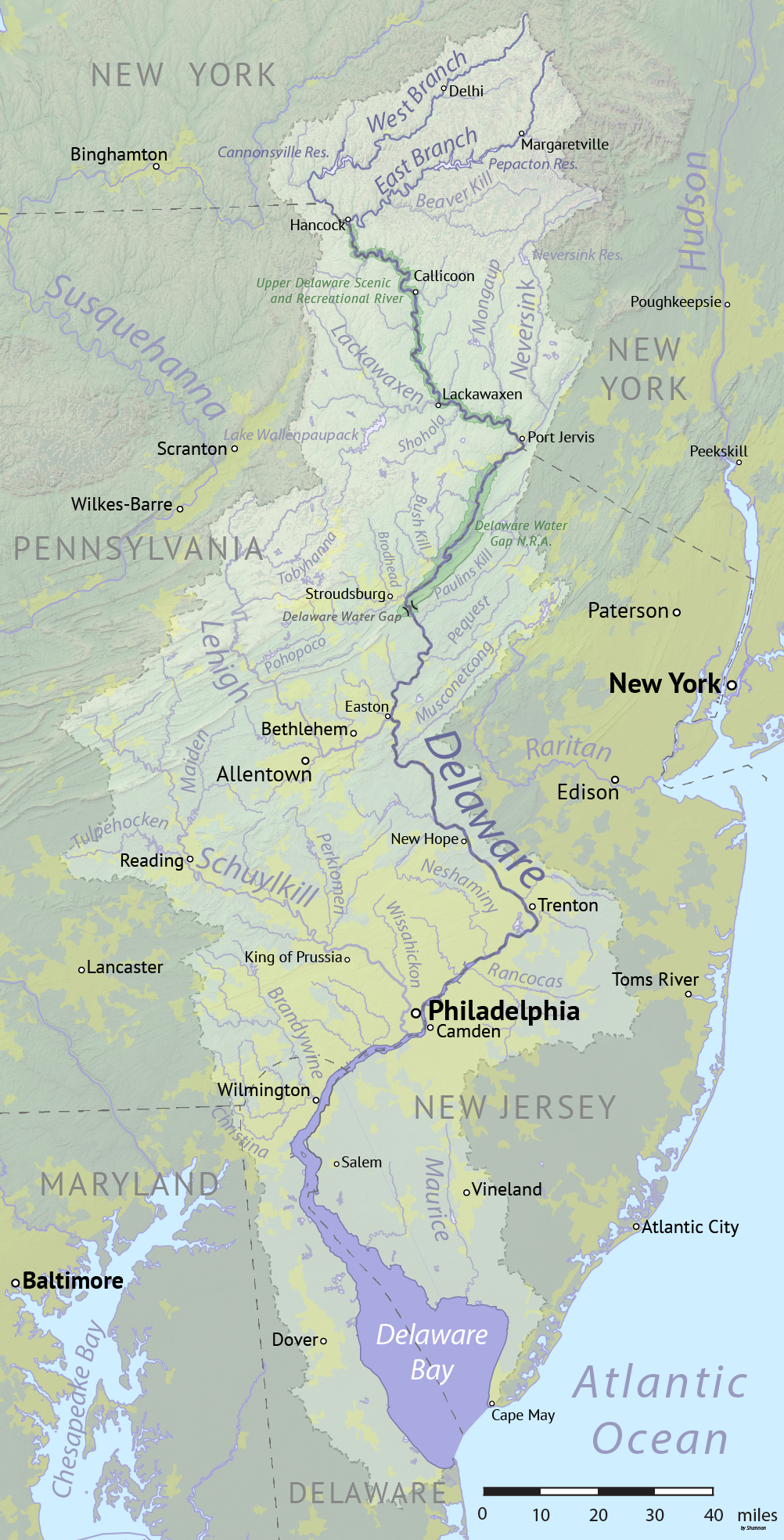
Delaware River watershed

The purpose of the Commission is to bring the Delaware River under collective and balanced control, and to ensure fair usage by the states. To this end, the Commission conducts programs related to water quality protection, water supply allocation and water conservation, regulatory review and permitting, watershed planning, drought management, flood mitigation and loss reduction, and recreational activities (such as fishing).

The DRBC was one of the first government agencies in the United States to address the problem of water pollution. The agency predates the establishment of the United States Environmental Protection Agency (1970) and the Clean Water Act (1972).

== Membership ==
The five members of the commission include the four state governors of the member states and the division engineer, North Atlantic Division, U.S. Army Corps of Engineers, who serves as the ex-officio U.S. member. As of 2021 the commission chair is Delaware Governor John Carney and the Federal Representative is Brigadier General Thomas J. Tickner.

== See also ==
- Partnership for the Delaware Estuary - Regional nonprofit organization
