= Northeast Public Health Collaborative =

American public health coalition

Northeast Public Health Collaborative member states

The Northeast Public Health Collaborative is a coalition created by the governors of several northeast states (including New York, Delaware, Maine, Maryland, New Jersey, Connecticut, Massachusetts, Rhode Island, Pennsylvania, Vermont, and Virginia) to coordinate public health guidelines separate from the CDC, similar to the West Coast Health Alliance. The NEPHC announced its formation on September 18, 2025. Maryland joined in September 2025, and Virginia joined in March 2026.

The voluntary collaboration aims "to share expertise, improve coordination, enhance capacity, strengthen regional readiness, and promote and protect evidence-based public health" and "ensure trust in public health, respond to public health threats, advance community health and strengthen confidence in ... science-based medicine".

The Collaborative launched its website in November, 2026. https://www.northeastpublichealth.org/

The NEPHC released COVID-19 vaccine recommendations for the 2025–2026 academic year on September 15, 2025.

== Background ==
Several Northeastern states and America's largest city have been collaborating since early 2025 and today formally announced the Northeast Public Health Collaborative, a voluntary regional coalition of public health agencies and leaders, brought together to share expertise, improve coordination, enhance capacity, strengthen regional readiness, and promote and protect evidence-based public health.

The Collaborative's shared purpose is to work together in new ways – optimizing the use of shared resources, innovating and reimagining core services – to ensure trust in public health, respond to public health threats, advance community health and strengthen confidence in vaccines and science-based medicine. The group's shared goal is to protect the health, safety and well-being of all residents by providing information based on science, data, and evidence, while working to ensure equitable access to vaccines, medications and services.

The regional partnership, which was informally established several months ago, held its first in-person meeting in Rhode Island in August. The Collaborative has already formed interjurisdictional working groups to identify opportunities for collaboration and shared planning across multiple public health disciplines including public health emergency preparedness and response, vaccine recommendations and purchasing, data collection and analysis, infectious disease, epidemiology and laboratory capacity and services.

Members of the Collaborative worked together on science-based guidance for health care personnel (HCP) advising on precautions health care workers should take to protect themselves and patients during respiratory virus season. Other examples of collaborative efforts include sharing information on public health emergency preparedness related to three FIFA (International Federation of Association Football) World Cup host cities within the collaborative, exploring workforce pipeline activities given the understaffing in public health and coordinating state lab related activities and services..

== See also ==
- Collaboratives for respiratory virus vaccine guidelines:
  - West Coast Health Alliance
- Governors Public Health Alliance
- Interstate pacts for COVID-19 pandemic recovery:
  - Eastern States Multi-state Council
  - Midwest Governors Regional Pact
  - Western States Pact
- Second presidency of Donald Trump
- Vaccination policy of the United States
