= Vaccination policy of the United States =

Overview of the vaccination policy in the United States of America

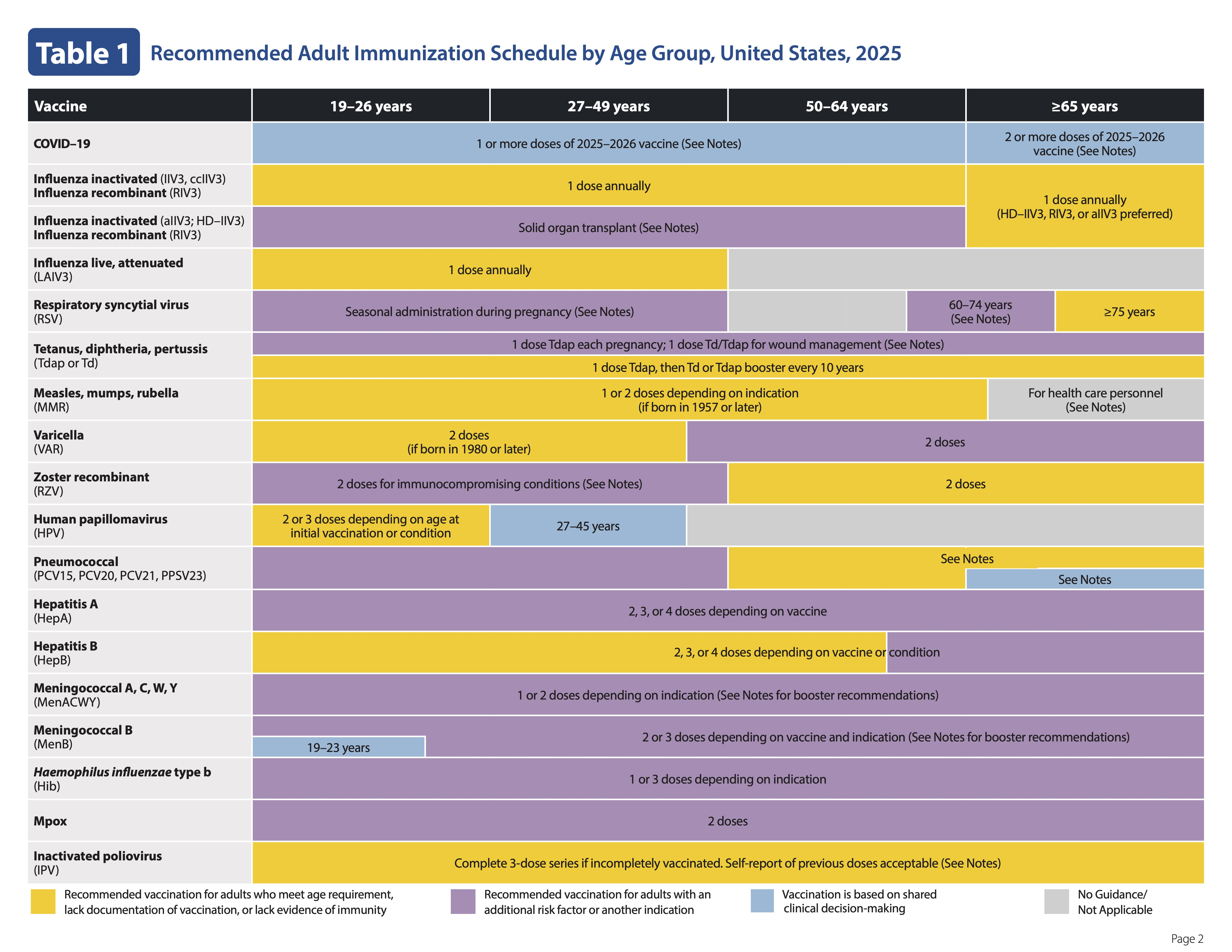
Vaccination schedule for 2025

Vaccination policy of the United States is the subset of U.S. federal health policy that deals with immunization against infectious disease. It is decided at various levels of government, including the individual states. This policy has been developed over the approximately two centuries since the invention of vaccination with the purpose of eradicating disease from the U.S. population, or creating a herd immunity. Policies intended to encourage vaccination impact numerous areas of law, including regulation of vaccine safety, funding of vaccination programs, vaccine mandates, adverse event reporting requirements, and compensation for injuries asserted to be associated with vaccination.

The Advisory Committee on Immunization Practices (ACIP) is responsible for making vaccine policies and recommendations for the vaccination schedule used in the United States. As of June 2025, after Secretary of Health and Human Services Robert F. Kennedy Jr. fired all 17 ACIP members and replaced them, the new members were either anti-vaccine activists or lacked expertise with vaccines. The resulting lack of trust in future changes to vaccine recommendations resulted in the creation of two interstate collaborations, the West Coast Health Alliance and Northeast Public Health Collaborative.

== Regulation of vaccine safety ==
The Food and Drug Administration (FDA) has the authority to enforce the safety of vaccines. The FDA requires that all new vaccines first be tested in laboratory settings and on animals, and must then carry out a series of increasingly stringent tests in human subjects. Once vaccines are introduced to the market, the FDA regularly inspects their production facilities, tests their quality, and receives reports of adverse reactions.

In the 2012 court case Coalition for Mercury-Free Drugs v. Sebelius, the U.S. Court of Appeals for the District of Columbia Circuit held that opponents of thimerosal-preserved vaccines lacked standing to challenge determinations by the Food and Drug Administration that the vaccines and their components were safe and effective. In the opinion, Judge Brett M. Kavanaugh (joined by Judith W. Rogers and Stephen F. Williams) therefore rejected the challenge on standing grounds. The court further found it irrelevant that thimerosal was included in some versions of mandated vaccines, because it was possible for those seeking to avoid the ingredient to receive thimerosal-free vaccines.

== Vaccination schedule and mandates ==
On January 5, 2026, Health and Human Services (HHS) Secretary Robert F. Kennedy Jr. announced unprecedented reductions by HHS in the CDC childhood vaccine schedule, eliminating recommendations that all children be immunized for rotavirus, influenza, RSV, meningococcal disease, hepatitis A, and hepatitis B. The American Public Health Association (APHA) portrayed the Trump administration’s reduced vaccine recommendations as "public health malpractice at the highest level" in a January 5, 2026, public statement, pointing out that the dangerously opaque decision-making process at play was completely devoid of scientific backing. Numerous other organizations and medical experts followed suit, immediately condemning the decision as well, characterizing it as a political move lacking transparency and scientific legitimacy; many health practitioners thus plan to follow the vaccine schedule recommended by the American Academy of Pediatrics instead, which is far more rigorously supported by data. Furthermore, experts fully expect these changes would increase preventable illness, hospitalization, and deaths among youth—endangering not only children and adolescents, but medically vulnerable community members, too, should the questionable process used by HHS in revising the recommendations survive court challenges. One such challenge is the March 16, 2026, ruling in U.S. District Court on the lawsuit American Academy of Pediatrics et al. v. Kennedy et al., which has blocked the downgraded vaccine recommendations on the grounds that these reductions in the immunization schedule were "arbitrary and capricious"; in addition to the American Academy of Pediatrics, plaintiffs include: the American College of Physicians, the American Public Health Association, and the Infectious Diseases Society of America.

The Advisory Committee on Immunization Practices (ACIP) makes scientific recommendations which are generally followed by the federal government, state governments, and private health insurance companies, including making recommendations for the vaccination schedule used in the United States.

On June 23, 2025, Secretary of Health and Human Services Robert F. Kennedy Jr. fired all 17 ACIP members and—with one exception—appointed members who were either anti-vaccine activists or who lacked expertise with vaccines. The resulting lack of trust in future changes to vaccine recommendations resulted in the creation of two interstate collaborations, the West Coast Health Alliance and Northeast Public Health Collaborative. Also, in American Academy of Pediatrics et al. v. Kennedy et al., the court’s ruling imposed a stay on the ACIP appointments by Kennedy and invalidated any policy decisions those appointees have made since he purged the previous committee (formerly composed of immunization experts).

The American Academy of Pediatrics (AAP) advises physicians to respect the refusal of parents to vaccinate their child after adequate discussion, unless the child is put at significant risk of harm (e.g., during an epidemic, or after a deep and contaminated puncture wound). Under such circumstances, the AAP states that parental refusal of immunization constitutes a form of medical neglect and should be reported to state child protective services agencies.

Vaccine Schedule for the United States: 2020
Infection	Birth	Months									Years										
Infection	Birth	1	2	4	6	9	12	15	18	19–23	2–3	4–6	7–10	11–12	13–15	16	17–18	19–26	27–49	50–64	65+
Hepatitis B	HepB†	HepB†		HepB‡	HepB†					HepB‡								HepB x2–3#			
Rotavirus			RV†	RV†	RV†																
Diphtheria			DTaP†	DTaP†	DTaP†	DTaP‡		DTaP†		DTaP‡		DTaP†	Tdap‡	Tdap†	Tdap‡			Td or Tdap (every 10 years)†			
Tetanus			DTaP†	DTaP†	DTaP†	DTaP‡		DTaP†		DTaP‡		DTaP†	Tdap‡	Tdap†	Tdap‡			Td or Tdap (every 10 years)†			
Pertussis			DTaP†	DTaP†	DTaP†	DTaP‡		DTaP†		DTaP‡		DTaP†	Tdap‡	Tdap†	Tdap‡			Td or Tdap (every 10 years)†			
Haemophilus influenzae			Hib†	Hib†	Hib†	Hib‡	Hib†		Hib‡				Hib#					Hib x1–3#			
Polio			IPV†	IPV†	IPV†					IPV‡		IPV†	IPV‡								
Pneumococcus			PCV13†	PCV13†	PCV13†	PCV13‡	PCV13†		PCV13‡				PCV13#					PCV13#			PCV13§
Pneumococcus											PPSV23#							PPSV23 x1–2#			PPSV23†
Influenza					IIV (yearly)†						IIV or LAIV (yearly)†										
Measles					MMR#		MMR†		MMR‡			MMR†	MMR‡					MMR x1–2‡			
Mumps					MMR#		MMR†		MMR‡			MMR†	MMR‡					MMR x1–2‡			
Rubella					MMR#		MMR†		MMR‡			MMR†	MMR‡					MMR x1–2‡			
Varicella							VAR†		VAR‡			VAR†	VAR‡					VAR x1–2‡		VAR 2x#	
Hepatitis A					HepA#		HepA x2†				HepA‡							HepA x2–3#			
Meningococcus			MenACWY#											MenACWY†	MenACWY‡	MenACWY†	MenACWY‡	MenACWY x1–2#			
Meningococcus														MenB x2–3#							
Meningococcus																	MenB§				
Human papillomavirus													HPV#	HPV x2–3†	HPV‡			HPV‡	HPV§		
Herpes Zoster																				RZV or ZVL†	
† Range of recommended ages for everyone. See references for more details.; # Range of recommended ages for certain high-risk groups. See references for more details.; ‡ Range of recommended ages for catch-up immunization or for people who lack evidence of immunity (e.g., lack documentation of vaccination or have no evidence of prior infection). (Note: CDC provides more detailed information in catch-up immunizations.); § Recommended vaccination based on shared clinical decision-making.

All vaccines recommended by the U.S. government for its citizens are required for green card applicants. This requirement stirred controversy when it was applied to the HPV vaccine in July 2008 due to the cost of the vaccine. In addition, the other thirteen required vaccines prevent highly contagious diseases communicable through the respiratory route, while HPV is spread only through sexual contact. In November 2009, this requirement was canceled.

Though the federal guidelines do not require written consent in order to receive a vaccination, they do require doctors give the recipients or legal representatives a Vaccine Information Statement (VIS). Specific informed consent laws are made by the states. Several states allow minors to legally consent to vaccination over parental objections under the mature minor doctrine. Socioeconomic disparities have been found to hinder reasonable access to vaccinations in the U.S., and it has also been found that even where such status is not a factor, "racial ethnic minority adults are less likely than whites to receive preventive care including vaccination".

According to 2024 CDC Morbidity and Mortality Weekly Report report, fewer children born during the first two years of the COVID-19 pandemic received recommended vaccines compared to those born in the two years prior. Vaccine coverage for children born in 2020 and 2021 dropped by 1.3 to 7.8 percentage points, depending on the vaccine, compared to those born in 2018 and 2019.

=== School children ===
==== History of school vaccination requirements ====
The United States has a long history of school vaccination requirements. The first school vaccination requirement was enacted in the 1850s in Massachusetts to prevent the spread of smallpox. The school vaccination requirement was put in place after compulsory school attendance law caused a rapid increase in the number of children in public schools, increasing the risk of smallpox outbreaks. The early movement towards school vaccination laws began at the local level including counties, cities, and boards of education. By 1827, Boston had become the first city to mandate that all children entering public schools show proof of vaccination. In addition, in 1855 the Commonwealth of Massachusetts had established its own statewide vaccination requirements for all students entering school, this influenced other states to implement similar statewide vaccination laws in schools as seen in New York in 1862, Connecticut in 1872, Pennsylvania in 1895, and later the Midwest, South, and Western US. By 1963, 20 states had school vaccination laws.

These vaccination laws resulted in political debates throughout the United States as those opposed to vaccination sought to repeal local policies and state laws. An example of this political controversy occurred in 1893 in Chicago, where less than ten percent of the children were vaccinated despite the twelve year old state law. Resistance was seen at the local level of the school district as some local school boards and superintendents opposed the state vaccination laws, leading the state board health inspectors to examine vaccination policies in schools. Resistance proceeded during the mid-1900s and in 1977, a nationwide Childhood Immunization Initiative was developed with the goal of increasing vaccination rates among children to 90% by 1979. During the 2-year period of observation, the initiative reviewed the immunization records of more than 28 million children and vaccinated children who hadn't received the recommended vaccines.

In 1922, the constitutionality of childhood vaccination was examined in the Supreme Court case Zucht v. King. The court ruled that a school could deny admission to children who failed to provide a certification of vaccination for the protection of the public health. In 1987, a measles epidemic occurred in Maricopa County, Arizona, and another court case, Maricopa County Health Department vs. Harmon, examined the arguments of an individual's right to education over the states need to protect against the spread of disease. The court found it prudent to take action to combat the spread of disease by denying un-vaccinated children a place in school until the risk for the spread of measles had passed. The Supreme Court has not since decided a vaccination mandate case, but noted in a subsequent case, Prince v. Massachusetts, that the state had power over certain activities of children, including requiring that they be vaccinated. The court in Prince said:

The family itself isn't beyond regulation in the public interest, as against a claim of religious liberty. And neither rights of religion nor rights of parenthood are beyond limitation. ... Its authority isn't nullified merely because the parent grounds his claim to control the child's course of conduct on religion or conscience. Thus, he cannot claim freedom from compulsory vaccination for the child more than for himself on religious grounds. The right to practice religion freely doesn't include liberty to expose the community or the child to communicable disease or the latter to ill health or death.

==== California Senate Bill 277 (2015) ====
Until 2015, all states except Mississippi and West Virginia allowed children to opt out of vaccination requirements for religious or philosophical reasons. However, this changed after California removed personal and religious exemptions with the passage of California Senate Bill 277. This is the first time an immunization exemption was removed by a state legislature. The bill was prompted by the 2014 Disneyland measles outbreak and low levels of vaccination in pockets of California, with some schools having vaccination rates below 60%. Despite the bill receiving support by the California Medical Association, as well as by the American Academy of Pediatrics' California affiliate, opposition to the bill had been characterized as "possibly the most strident outpouring of political dissent in recent memory."

California's abolition of all non-medical exemptions for school entrance was upheld by the courts in 2018; a California appellate court rejected a dissident group's claims that the mandatory-vaccination law violated the right to due process, right to privacy, right to a public education, and right to free exercise of religion under the California Constitution.

Following the law's enactment, while vaccination rates among California schoolchildren increased, the rate of medical exemptions also increased. Following scrutiny among public health officials over the rise of unjustified medical exemptions, Senate Bill 276 was signed into law in 2019, which made it harder to obtain a medical exemption and authorized the state health department to investigate any doctor who wrote too many exemptions. Both Senate Bill 277 and Senate Bill 276 were authored by practicing pediatrician and state Senator Richard Pan.

In the coming years, states with strong Democratic majorities will pass similar vaccine mandate laws. Following the 2019 measles outbreak, non-medical exemptions were repealed in New York (Assembly Bill 2371 and Senate Bill 2994 in 2019), Maine (LD 798 in 2019, upheld by voters in a 2020 referendum), and Connecticut (House Bill 6423 in 2021); Washington state repealed the personal belief exemption for the MMR vaccination in 2019 with the passage of House Bill 1638 while maintaining religious and medical exemptions.

==== COVID-19 vaccine mandates ====
During the COVID-19 pandemic, no states successfully mandated the COVID-19 vaccine for K-12 students, although several attempts were made to do so in various states.

In October 2021, California Governor Gavin Newsom announced a COVID-19 vaccine mandate for all public and private school students for the upcoming school year. Despite strong support from public health officials, there were several issues with implementation and widespread public backlash that resulted in the mandate being delayed until 2023 before it was quietly removed.

Similarly, in December 2021, the Council of the District of Columbia passed legislation that would have required all children ages twelve and older to receive the COVID-19 vaccine in order to attend school. Due to difficulties surrounding implementation and the unpopularity of the requirement, the mandate was repeatedly delayed before being repealed in January 2024.

==== 2020s weakening of school immunization requirements ====
After the rollout of the COVID-19 vaccine, public support for vaccination mandates declined, especially among Republicans. In response, some conservative states have loosened their immunization policies for schools. In July 2023, Mississippi started recognizing religious exemptions for the first time after a judge's order. In January 2025, West Virginia governor Patrick Morrisey issued an executive order allowing religious exemptions in the state, however, the order has not been enforced as of June 2025, and the state's Board of Education had voted to ignore the order.

In April 2025, Idaho became the first and only state to remove most of the state's immunization requirements, including those for K-12 schools, after the passage of Senate Bill 1210. Under this law, while schools and businesses can refuse students and employees who are actively sick from being on the premises, they cannot require any medical intervention, including vaccines.

==== Current requirements and exemptions ====
As of 2025, all states in the U.S. except for Idaho mandate immunizations for children in order to enroll in public school, but the specific vaccines required differ from state to state, and various exemptions are available depending on state law. All states have exemptions for children with medical contraindications to vaccines; 45 states and the District of Columbia grant exemptions for people who have religious objections to immunizations, and of those states, sixteen including DC include philosophical or personal choice exemptions for some or all of the required immunizations. In September of 2025, Florida announces plans to become the "first" state to eliminate school vaccine mandates (Idaho's vaccine mandate ban already came into effect in July of 2025).

The five states that do not recognize religious or philosophical objections are California, Connecticut, Maine, New York, and West Virginia.

Of the 49 states with existing immunization requirements for public school, all of them require DTaP (diphtheria-tetanus-pertussis), MMR (measles-mumps-rubella), Polio, Tdap (tetanus-diphtheria-pertussis; secondary school only) and Varicella (chickenpox) vaccines for school attendance. Additionally, 46 states require the Hepatitis B vaccine, 34 states require the Meningococcal vaccine, and 18 require the Hepatitis A vaccine; Rhode Island, Virginia, and Hawaii also require the HPV vaccine (human papillomavirus; secondary school only).

Beginning in the 2000s, an increasing number of parents, invoking religious and philosophical exemptions, did not allow their children to receive vaccinations. Research establishes a link between the rise of vaccine-preventable diseases and non-medical exemptions from school vaccination requirements, with the increased use of such exemptions contributing to loss of herd immunity within high-vaccine refusal communities ("clusters"), and hence an increasing number of infectious disease outbreaks, including measles outbreaks in 2018 and 2019. "Exemption clustering" has been identified as a collective action threat to public health. Some states require parents seeking exemptions to receive counseling or attend informational sessions on vaccine safety and related matters. In the twenty seventeen case of Nikolao v. Lyon, the United States Court of Appeals for the Sixth Circuit found that there was no injury supporting legal standing to sue over an objection to such a requirement.

Immunization information systems (IIS) are complex in the U.S., and the convoluted network of public health, medical, and education system data impedes the sharing of data on student vaccination histories. A 2014 study of the 50 states, the District of Columbia, and five cities founded that, as of 2010, about 79% of these systems required "schools or child-care facilities to report immunizations to local education or public health departments or allow them access to their records" and required provision of this information for children to attend school or for a child-care facility to receive and maintain its license. The study found, however, that only 11% of systems required that schools or child-care facilities coordinate with IIS. The study found that five factors complicated compliance with policies on maintaining records on proof of immunization: "a complex and changing recommended immunization schedule, duplication of record-keeping efforts, conflict and confusion between health record and education record policies, no or limited school access to IIS, and fear of penalties for violating privacy policies."

States, rather than individual school districts, generally set policy on vaccinations required for school enrollment/attendance, including exemptions. The San Diego Unified School District attempted in 2021 to set additional student vaccination rules, but the California Supreme Court unanimously ruled in 2023 that, under California law, "the vaccinations required for school attendance present a statewide issue subject to statewide criteria. ... Local variations must give way to a uniform state standard."

=== Health care workers ===
Most states have some kind of requirement that at least some kinds of health care workers receive certain vaccinations to protect their patients, e.g. influenza, measles, hepatitis B (potential exposure to blood) and rubella (potential contact with pregnant women).

=== Military personnel ===
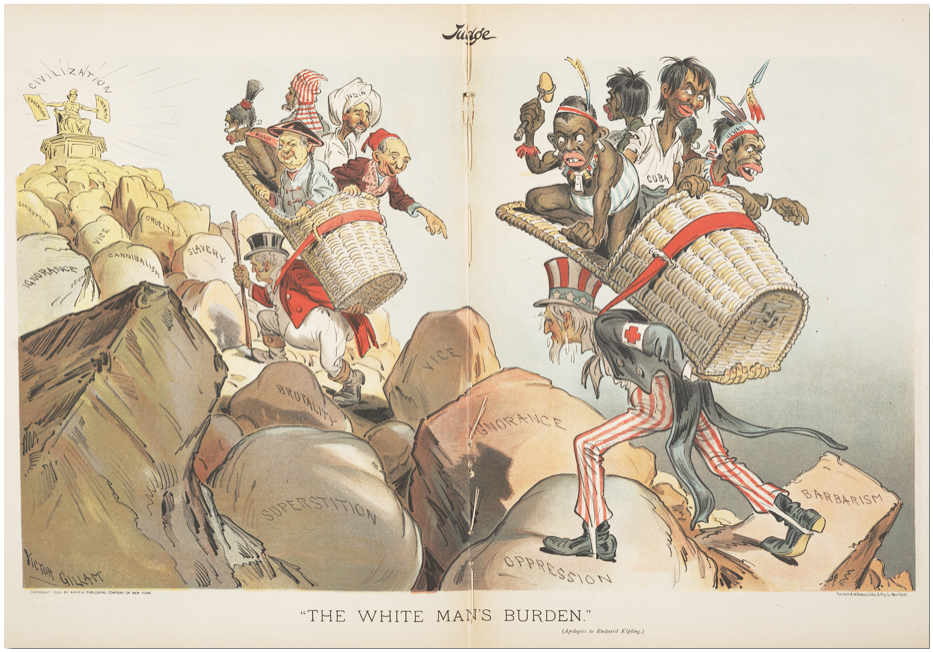
Judge's cartoon of Rudyard Kipling's famous poem "The White Man's Burden" published in 1899. The poem's philosophy quickly was utilized to explain/justify the United States response to annexation of the Philippines. The United States used the "white man's burden" as an argument for imperial control of the Philippines and Puerto Rico on the basis of moral necessity to ensure the spread of civility and modernity.

Immunizations are often compulsory for military enlistment in the U.S. The United States has a very complex history with compulsory vaccination, particularly in enforcing it both domestically and abroad to protect American soldiers during times of war. There are hundreds of thousands of examples of soldier deaths not from combat wounds but disease. During the American Revolutionary War, General George Washington required American soldiers to undergo variolation for smallpox out of concern that the British, who had long practiced it in their own military, would be able to use smallpox as a weapon against the Continental Army. Among wars with high death tolls from disease was the Civil War where an estimated 224,000 soldiers died from all diseases combined. American soldiers in other countries have spread diseases that have ultimately disrupted entire societies and healthcare systems with famine and poverty.

==== Spanish–American War ====
The Spanish–American War began in April 1898 and ended in August 1898. During this time the United States gained control of Cuba, Puerto Rico, and the Philippines from Spain. As a military police power and as colonizers the United States took a very hands-on approach in administering healthcare particularly vaccinations to natives during the invasion and conquest of these countries. Although the Spanish–American War occurred during the era of "bacteriological revolution" where knowledge of disease was bolstered by germ theory, more than half of the soldier casualties in this war were from disease. Unknowingly, American soldiers acted as agents of disease transmission, fostering bacteria in their haphazardly made camps. These soldiers invaded Cuba, Puerto Rico, and the Philippines and connected parts of these countries that had never before been connected due to the countries sparse nature thereby beginning epidemics. The mobility of American soldiers around these countries encouraged a newfound mobility of disease that quickly infected natives.

Military personnel used Rudyard's Kipling's poem "The White Man's Burden" to explain their imperialistic actions in Cuba, the Philippines, and Puerto Rico and the need for the United States to help the "dark-skinned Barbarians" reach modern sanitary standards. American actions abroad before, during, and after the war emphasized a need for proper sanitation habits especially on behalf of the natives. Natives who refused to oblige with American health standards and procedures risked fines or imprisonment. One penalty in Puerto Rico included a $10 fine for a failure to vaccinate and an additional $5 fine for any day you continue to be unvaccinated, refusal to pay resulted in ten or more days of imprisonment. If entire villages refused the army's current sanitation policy at any given time they risked being burnt to the ground in order to preserve the health and safety of soldiers from endemic smallpox and yellow fever. Vaccines were forcibly administered to the Puerto Ricans, Cubans, and Filipinos. Military personnel in Puerto Rico provided Public Health services that culminated in military orders mandating vaccinations for children before they were six months old, as well as a general vaccination order. By the end of 1899 in Puerto Rico alone the U.S. military and other hired native vaccinators called practicantes, vaccinated an estimated 860,000 natives in a five-month period. This period began the United States' movement toward an expansion of medical practices that included "tropical medicine" in an attempt to protect the lives of soldiers abroad.

== Adverse event reporting ==
There are several programs for monitoring the safety of vaccines in the United States. Chief among these is the Vaccine Adverse Event Reporting System (VAERS), which is co-managed by the U.S. Centers for Disease Control and Prevention (CDC) and the Food and Drug Administration (FDA). VAERS is a postmarketing surveillance program, collecting information about adverse events (possible harmful side effects) that occur after administration of vaccines to ascertain whether the risk–benefit ratio is high enough to justify continued use of any particular vaccine. In addition to VAERS, the Vaccine Safety Datalink, and the Clinical Immunization Safety Assessment (CISA) Network are tools by which the CDC and FDA measure vaccine safety.

== Vaccine injury compensation ==
The National Vaccine Injury Compensation Program (VICP or NVICP) was established pursuant to the 1986 National Childhood Vaccine Injury Act (NCVIA), passed by the United States Congress in response to a threat to the vaccine supply due to a 1980s scare over the DPT vaccine. Despite the belief of most public health officials that claims of side effects were unfounded, large jury awards had been given to some plaintiffs, most DPT vaccine makers had ceased production, and officials feared the loss of herd immunity. The U.S. Department of Health and Human Services (DHHS) set up the National Vaccine Injury Compensation Program (VICP) in 1988 to compensate individuals and families of individuals injured by covered childhood vaccines.

The Office of Special Masters of the U.S. Court of Federal Claims, popularly known as "vaccine court", administers a no-fault system for litigating vaccine injury claims. These claims against vaccine manufacturers cannot normally be filed in state or federal civil courts, but instead must be heard in the U.S. Court of Federal Claims, sitting without a jury. Compensation covers medical and legal expenses, loss of future earning capacity, and up to $250,000 for pain and suffering; a death benefit of up to $250,000 is available. If certain minimal requirements are met, legal expenses are compensated even for unsuccessful claims. Since 1988, the program has been funded by an excise tax of 75 cents on every purchased dose of a covered vaccine. To win an award, a claimant must have experienced an injury that is named as a vaccine injury in a table included in the law within the required time period or show a causal connection. The burden of proof is the civil law preponderance-of-the-evidence standard, in other words a showing that causation was more likely than not. Denied claims can be pursued in civil courts, though this is rare.

The VICP covers all vaccines listed on the Vaccine Injury Table maintained by the Secretary of Health and Human Services; in 2007 the list included vaccines against diphtheria, tetanus, pertussis (whooping cough), measles, mumps, rubella (German measles), polio, hepatitis B, varicella (chicken pox), Haemophilus influenzae type b, rotavirus, and pneumonia. From 1988 until 8 January 2008, 5,263 claims relating to autism, and 2,865 non-autism claims, were made to the VICP. 925 of these claims, one autism-related (see previous rulings), were compensated, with 1,158 non-autism and 350 autism claims dismissed; awards (including attorney's fees) totaled $847 million. As of October 2019, $4.2 billion in compensation (not including attorneys fees and costs) has been awarded over the forty-three year history of the program.

== Vaccine development funding ==
According to the World Health Organization (WHO), vaccines build the body's immune system to protect it from illnesses like measles, mumps, and other life threatening diseases. Widespread vaccination is encouraged in the US, and government and private funding has been designated to further grow the promising technology emerging in vaccine structure, including the mRNA technology recently implemented in the COVID-19 vaccine. According to the National Institutes of Health (NIH), while the exact number invested by the US government in mRNA vaccines is unclear, it is estimated that the Biomedical Advanced Research and Development Authority (BARDA) has spent nearly $40 billion on developing mRNA vaccines alone, with contracts for vaccine development also held by the US Department of Defense. By investing government money into vaccine development, politicians hope to further protect US citizens from infectious diseases and further commit to worldwide vaccine goals that make vaccines more accessible to all types of people.

As noted in a study performed by The Lancet, governments around the world often play a large role in vaccine accessibility for their citizens when it comes to how much a vaccine costs, and how accessible it is to its citizens. While privately funded programs like the Bill & Melinda Gates Foundation play substantial roles in vaccine development, The Lancet highlights how government funding from 2000-2017 has pioneered much of the spending on vaccines in the world and continues to be an essential asset in increasing vaccine accessibility to citizens.

In August 2025, despite U.S. DHHS claims during the Trump administration of promoting "gold standard science" and "evidence-based practices," Secretary of DHHS Robert F. Kennedy Jr. made multiple erroneous statements when canceling approximately $500 million of federal funding towards the continued development of mRNA vaccines, including incorrect assertions that they provide inadequate protection against Covid, and that one viral mutation renders them ineffective.

Kennedy's claims challenging the effectiveness of mRNA vaccines are not supported by scientific consensus and have drawn scathing criticism from experts. Also, DHHS has misrepresented a cherry-picked list of research studies, offering it as evidence for the funding cuts, when, in fact, the vast majority of the studies listed consist of research on the adverse effects of the virus itself, not the vaccine; furthermore, the list was created during the writing of an anti-vaccine book published in 2024 and assembled by individuals lacking expertise in COVID-19: a dentist, a writer, a veterinary professor, and a DHHS adviser who had previously promoted hydroxychloroquine as an unfounded treatment for COVID-19.

== Vaccine policy for travelers entering the United States ==
While routine vaccines are recommended for travelers entering the US, there is no official vaccine mandate currently in place for the United States, according to the US Department of State. However, during the COVID-19 pandemic, COVID-19 vaccines were required for all entering nonimmigration travelers up until May 12, 2023.

Because there are no official vaccine requirements for visitors temporarily entering the US, policies enacted so as to ensure the spread of diseases among US citizens are regulated. For this reason, the US enacts specific policies regarding foreign travel in order to ensure a minimal spread of disease within its borders. As stated by the US Center For Disease Controls and Prevention (CDC), this task has been given to the Department of Health and Human Services (HHS) and coincides with the work of the Division of Global Migration Health (DGMH) to regulate the isolation and quarantine of suspected airline or ship passengers experiencing elevated symptoms of certain diseases. To further isolate against certain diseases entering the US from foreign imports, strict guidelines are implemented regarding what can and cannot be imported to the US from cargo ships and travelers, and potentially harmful items are removed by customs officials and not allowed to enter the country.

For those who seek to become US citizens, according to the US Department of State, those applying for immigration visas are required to be vaccinated against certain diseases common alongside US school vaccines policies, including measles, mumps, and varicella, to name a few. Those applying for visas are required to show proof of these required vaccines at the time of their application submission.

== See also ==
- Albert Sabin
- Comparison of the healthcare systems in Canada and the United States
- Health care in the United States
- Health care prices in the United States
- Health in the United States
- Health insurance in the United States
- Health Insurance Portability and Accountability Act (HIPAA)
- History of health care reform in the United States
- History of medicine in the United States
- Jonas Salk
- List of epidemics and pandemics
- List of vaccine topics
- Maurice Hilleman
- 1918 influenza pandemic
- Polio vaccine
- Public policy of the United States
- Race and health in the United States
- United States Preventive Services Task Force
- Vaccine hesitancy
- Vaccination policy
- Vaccination schedule
