= Brett Kavanaugh =

US Supreme Court justice since 2018

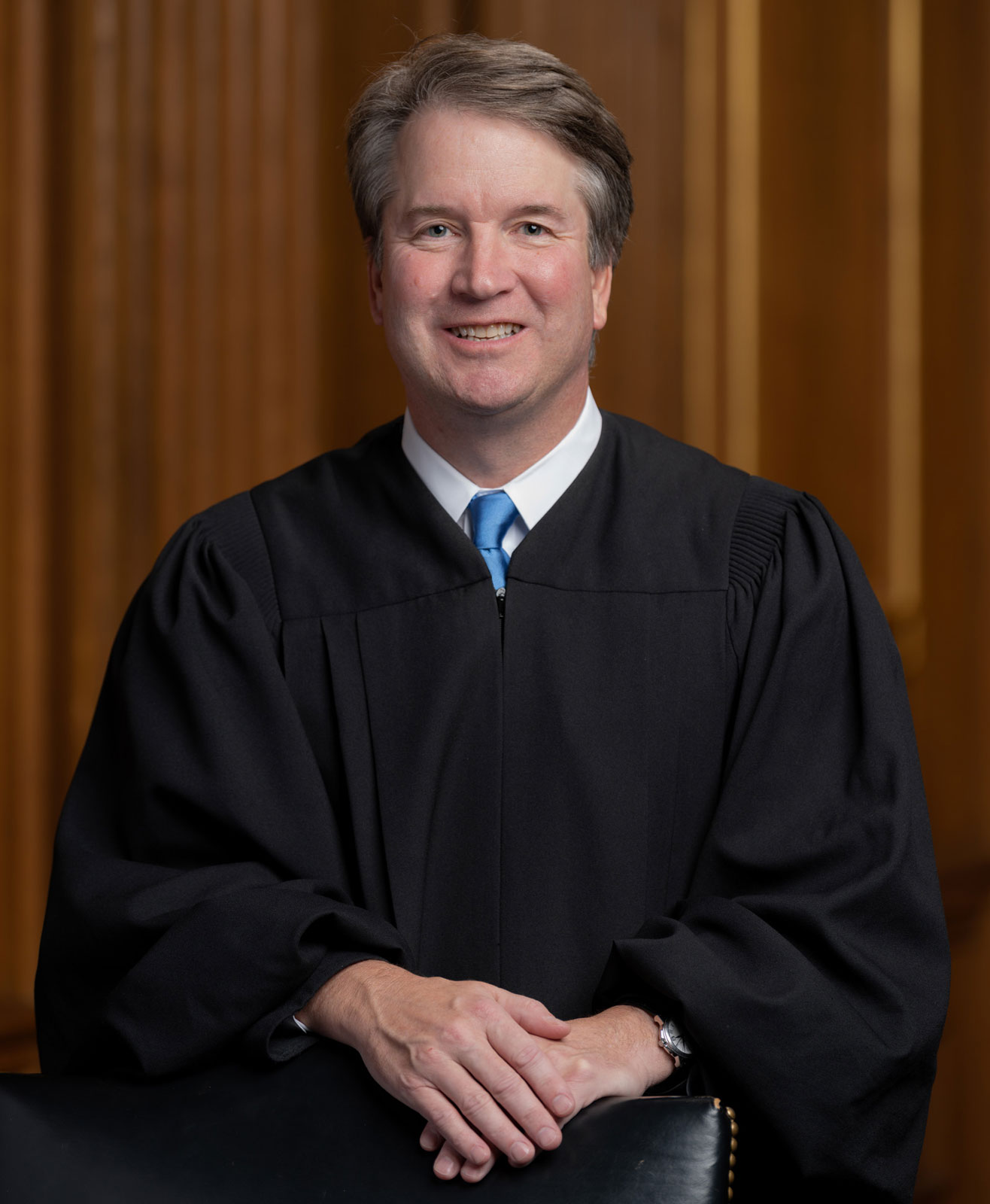
- Official portrait, 2018

Associate Justice of the Supreme Court of the United States
- Incumbent
- Assumed office October 6, 2018
- Appointed by: Donald Trump
- Preceded by: Anthony Kennedy

Judge of the United States Court of Appeals for the District of Columbia Circuit
- In office May 30, 2006 – October 6, 2018
- Appointed by: George W. Bush
- Preceded by: Laurence Silberman
- Succeeded by: Neomi Rao

White House Staff Secretary
- In office June 6, 2003 – May 30, 2006
- President: George W. Bush
- Preceded by: Harriet Miers
- Succeeded by: Raul Yanes

Personal details
- Born: Brett Michael Kavanaugh; February 12, 1965 (age 61) Washington, D.C., U.S.
- Party: Republican
- Spouse: Ashley Estes (m. 2004)
- Children: 2
- Education: Yale University (BA, JD)
- Kavanaugh's voice Kavanaugh delivering the decision for New York v. New Jersey. Recorded April 18, 2023

Brett Michael Kavanaugh (/ˈkævənɔː/; born February 12, 1965) is an American lawyer and jurist serving as an associate justice of the Supreme Court of the United States. He was nominated by President Donald Trump on July 9, 2018, and has served since October 6, 2018. He was previously a United States circuit judge of the United States Court of Appeals for the District of Columbia Circuit from 2006 to 2018.

Kavanaugh studied history at Yale University, where he joined the Delta Kappa Epsilon fraternity. After graduating from Yale Law School, he served as a law clerk for Judge Ken Starr of the D.C. Circuit. After Starr left the D.C. Circuit to become the head of the Office of Independent Counsel, Kavanaugh assisted him with investigations concerning President Bill Clinton, including drafting the Starr Report recommending Clinton's impeachment. He joined the Bush administration as White House staff secretary and was a central figure in its efforts to identify and confirm judicial nominees. President George W. Bush nominated Kavanaugh to the United States Court of Appeals for the District of Columbia Circuit in 2003. His confirmation hearings were contentious and stalled for three years over charges of partisanship. Kavanaugh was confirmed to the District of Columbia Circuit in May 2006.

President Trump nominated Kavanaugh to the United States Supreme Court on July 9, 2018, to fill the position vacated by Justice Anthony Kennedy. Before his United States Senate confirmation proceedings began, Christine Blasey Ford accused Kavanaugh of sexually assaulting her in the early 1980s. Three other women also accused Kavanaugh of sexual misconduct. None of the accusations were corroborated by eyewitness testimony, and Kavanaugh denied them. The Senate Judiciary Committee held a supplemental hearing over the allegations and voted 11–10 along party lines to advance the confirmation to a full Senate vote. On October 6, the full Senate confirmed Kavanaugh by a vote of 50–48.

Since the death of Ruth Bader Ginsburg in 2020, Kavanaugh has come to be regarded as a swing vote on the Court. He was the target of an assassination plot in June 2022; the suspect had hoped to disrupt the rulings in Dobbs and Bruen.

== Early life and education ==
Kavanaugh was born on February 12, 1965, in Washington, D.C., the son of Martha Gamble (née Murphy) and Everett Edward Kavanaugh Jr. He is of Irish Catholic descent on both sides of his family. His paternal great-grandfather Patrick Kavanaugh immigrated to Connecticut from Roscommon, Ireland, in 1878, and his maternal great-great-grandfather Michael Murphy and his wife emigrated from Ireland to New Jersey. Kavanaugh's father was a lawyer and served as the president of the Cosmetic, Toiletry and Fragrance Association for two decades. His mother was a history teacher at Woodson and McKinley high schools in Washington in the 1960s and 1970s. She earned a Juris Doctor degree from American University in 1978 and served from 1995 to 2001 as a Maryland Circuit Court judge in Montgomery County, Maryland.

Kavanaugh was raised in Bethesda, Maryland. As a teenager, he attended Georgetown Preparatory School, a Jesuit boys' college prep school, where he was two years ahead of Neil Gorsuch, with whom he later clerked at the Supreme Court and alongside whom he later served as a Supreme Court justice. He was captain of the school's basketball team and was a wide receiver and cornerback on the football team. Kavanaugh was also friends with classmate Mark Judge; both were in the same class with Maryland state senator Richard Madaleno.

After graduating from Georgetown Prep in 1983, Kavanaugh went to Yale University, as had his paternal grandfather. Several of Kavanaugh's Yale classmates remembered him as a "serious but not showy student" who loved sports, especially basketball. He unsuccessfully tried out for the Yale Bulldogs men's basketball team and later played for two years on the junior varsity team. He wrote articles about basketball and other sports for the Yale Daily News, and was a member of the fraternity Delta Kappa Epsilon. He graduated from Yale in 1987 with a Bachelor of Arts cum laude in history.

Kavanaugh then attended Yale Law School, where he lived in a group house with future judge James E. Boasberg and played basketball with professor George L. Priest, the sponsor of the school's Federalist Society. He was a member of the Yale Law Journal and served as a notes editor during his third year. Kavanaugh graduated from Yale Law with a Juris Doctor degree in 1990.

== Legal career (1990–2006) ==
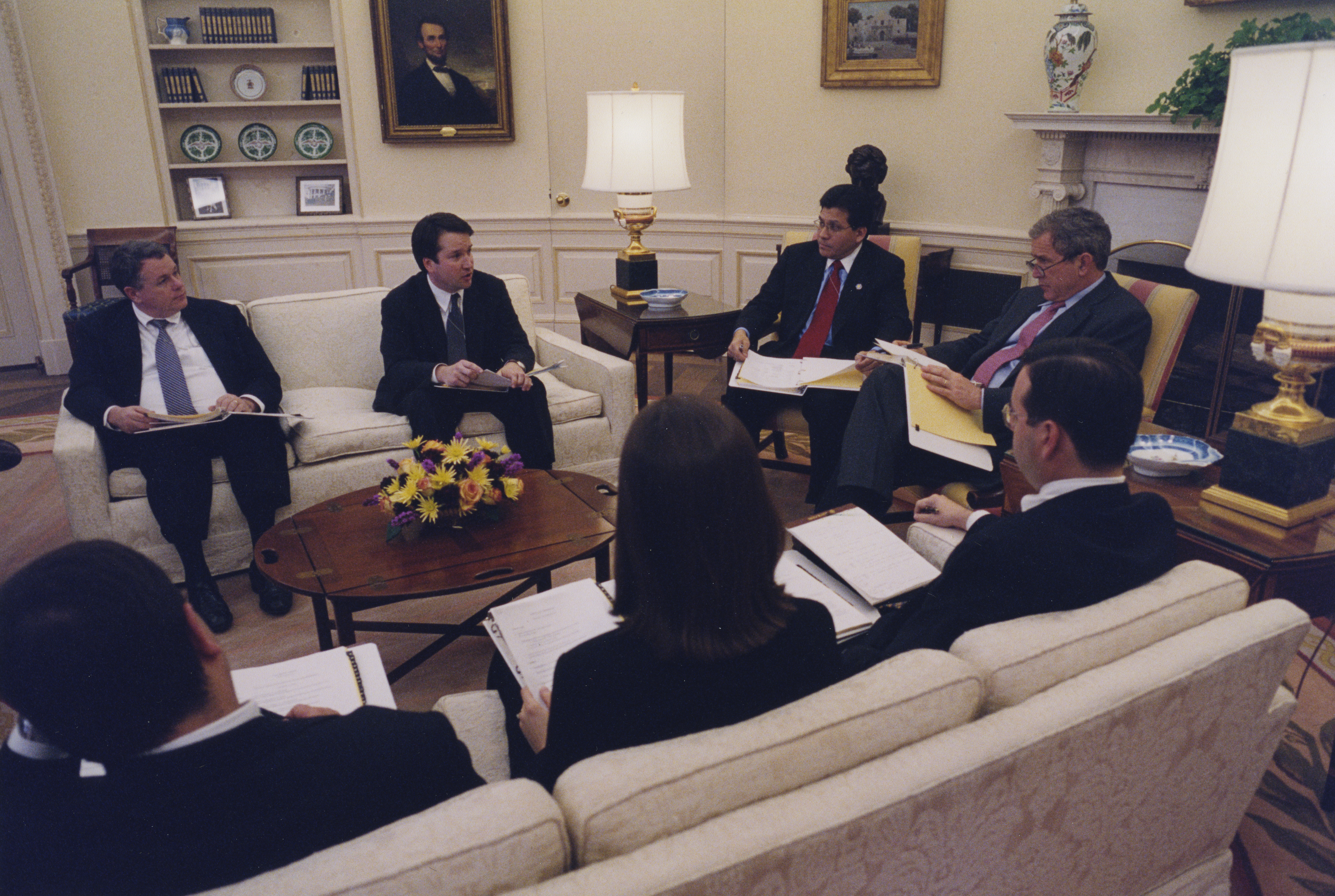
Kavanaugh (second from left) with President George W. Bush and White House staffers

=== Clerkships ===
Kavanaugh served as a law clerk for Judge Walter King Stapleton of the United States Court of Appeals for the Third Circuit from 1990 to 1991. During his clerkship, Stapleton wrote the majority opinion in Planned Parenthood v. Casey, in which the Third Circuit upheld many of Pennsylvania's abortion restrictions. Kavanaugh then clerked for Judge Alex Kozinski of the United States Court of Appeals for the Ninth Circuit from 1991 to 1992. Yale Law professor George Priest recommended Kavanaugh to Kozinski, who was regarded as a feeder judge. Kavanaugh interviewed for a clerkship with Chief Justice William Rehnquist of the United States Supreme Court during the 1992 term, but was not offered a clerkship.

After working as a summer associate for the law firm Munger, Tolles & Olson, Kavanaugh earned a one-year fellowship with the Solicitor General of the United States, Ken Starr, from 1992 to 1993. He then clerked for Supreme Court Justice Anthony Kennedy from 1993 to 1994, alongside Neil Gorsuch and with future federal judge Gary Feinerman.

=== Ken Starr associate counsel ===
After his Supreme Court clerkship, Kavanaugh again worked for Ken Starr until 1997 as an Associate Counsel in the Office of the Independent Counsel with colleagues Rod Rosenstein and Alex Azar. In that capacity, he reopened an investigation into the 1993 gunshot death of Vincent Foster. After three years, the investigation concluded that Foster had committed suicide. In a September 2018 New York Times op-ed, Princeton University history professor Sean Wilentz criticized Kavanaugh for having invested federal money and other resources into investigating partisan conspiracy theories surrounding the cause of Foster's death.

After working in private practice in 1997–98, Kavanaugh rejoined Starr as an Associate Counselor in 1998. In Swidler & Berlin v. United States (1998), Kavanaugh argued his first and only case before the Supreme Court. Arguing for Starr's office, Kavanaugh asked the Court to disregard attorney–client privilege in relation to the investigation of Foster's death. The court rejected Kavanaugh's arguments by a vote of 6–3.

Kavanaugh was a principal author of the Starr Report, released in September 1998, on the Bill Clinton–Monica Lewinsky sex scandal; the report argued on broad grounds for Clinton's impeachment. Kavanaugh had urged Starr to ask Clinton sexually graphic questions, and described Clinton as being involved in "a conspiracy to obstruct justice", having "disgraced his office" and "lied to the American people". The report provided extensive and explicit descriptions of each of Clinton's sexual encounters with Lewinsky, a level of detail the authors called "essential" to the case against Clinton.

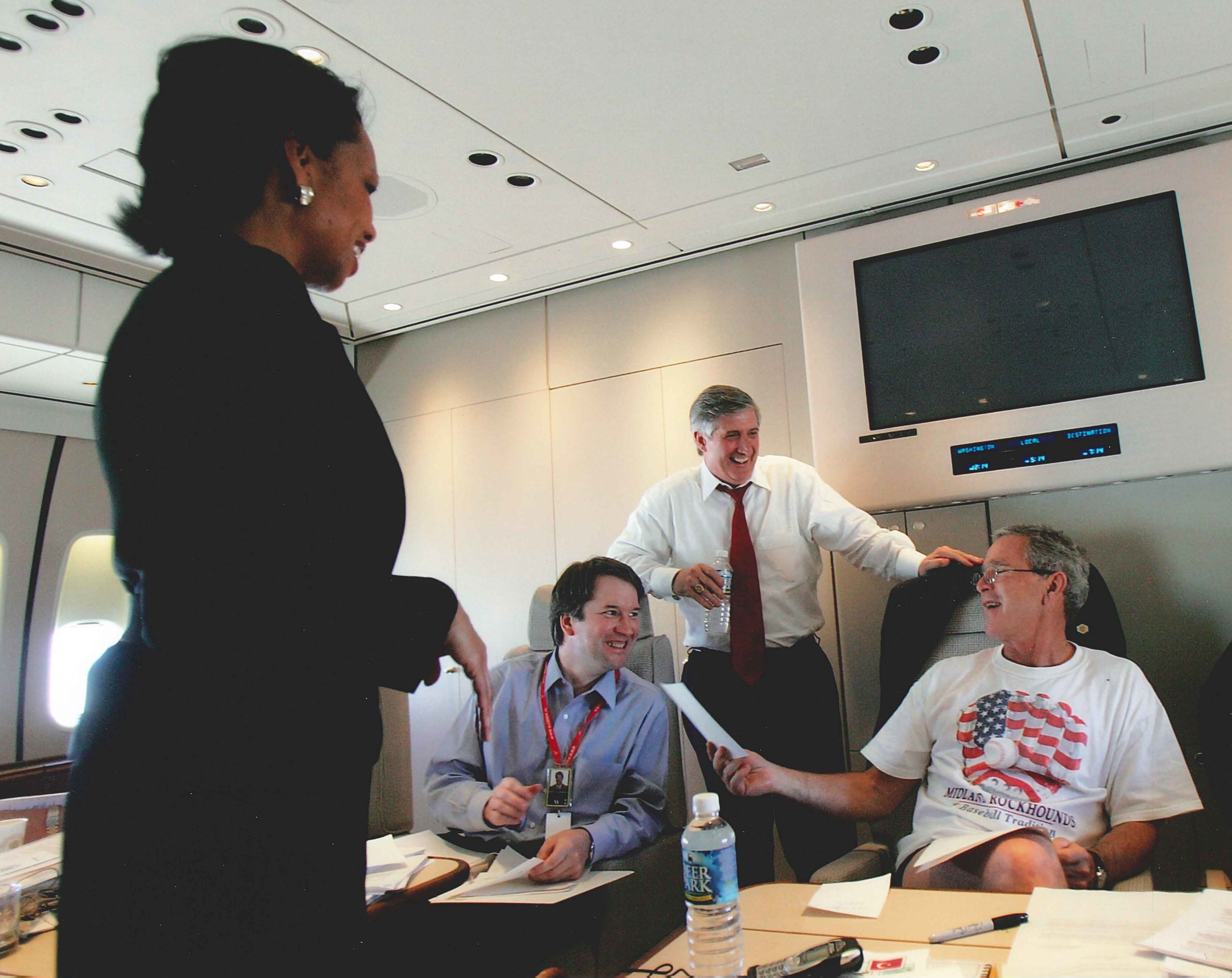
Kavanaugh (blue shirt) with President Bush, Andy Card, and Condoleezza Rice

In December 2000, Kavanaugh joined the legal team of George W. Bush, which was trying to stop the ballot recount in Florida. After Bush became president in January 2001, White House Counsel Alberto Gonzales hired Kavanaugh as an associate. There, Kavanaugh worked on the Enron scandal, the successful nomination of Chief Justice John Roberts, and the unsuccessful nomination of Miguel Estrada to the Court of Appeals. Starting in July 2003, he served as Assistant to the President and White House staff secretary, succeeding Harriet Miers. As the staff secretary, Kavanaugh was involved in the president's speechwriting process, helped put together legislation, and worked on drafting and revising executive orders. He was also responsible for coordinating all documents going to and from the president.

=== Private practice ===
From 1997 to 1998, Kavanaugh was an associate at the law firm Kirkland & Ellis. Kavanaugh rejoined Kirkland & Ellis in 1999 and eventually became a partner. While there in 2000, he was pro bono counsel of record for relatives of Elián González, a six-year-old rescued Cuban boy. After the boy's mother's death at sea, his relatives in the United States wanted to keep him from returning to the care of his sole surviving parent, his father in Cuba. Kavanaugh was among a series of lawyers who unsuccessfully sought to stop efforts to repatriate González to Cuba. The district court, Circuit Court and Supreme Court all followed precedent, refusing to block the repatriation.

Also at Kirkland & Ellis, Kavanaugh authored two amicus briefs to the Supreme Court that supported religious activities and expressions in public places. The first, in Santa Fe Independent School District v. Doe (2000), argued that a student speaker at football games voted for by a majority of students should be treated as private speech in a limited public forum; the second, in Good News Club v. Milford Central School, argued that a Christian Bible instruction program should have the same after-school access to school facilities as other non-curriculum-related student groups.

=== Federalist Society ===
Kavanaugh has been a member of the Federalist Society since 1988. In the administration of George W. Bush, he held a key position that involved judicial appointments. Bush judicial nominees who were Federalist Society members included John Roberts and Samuel Alito, both appointed to the Supreme Court, and about half the judges appointed to the courts of appeals.

== United States circuit judge (2006–2018) ==
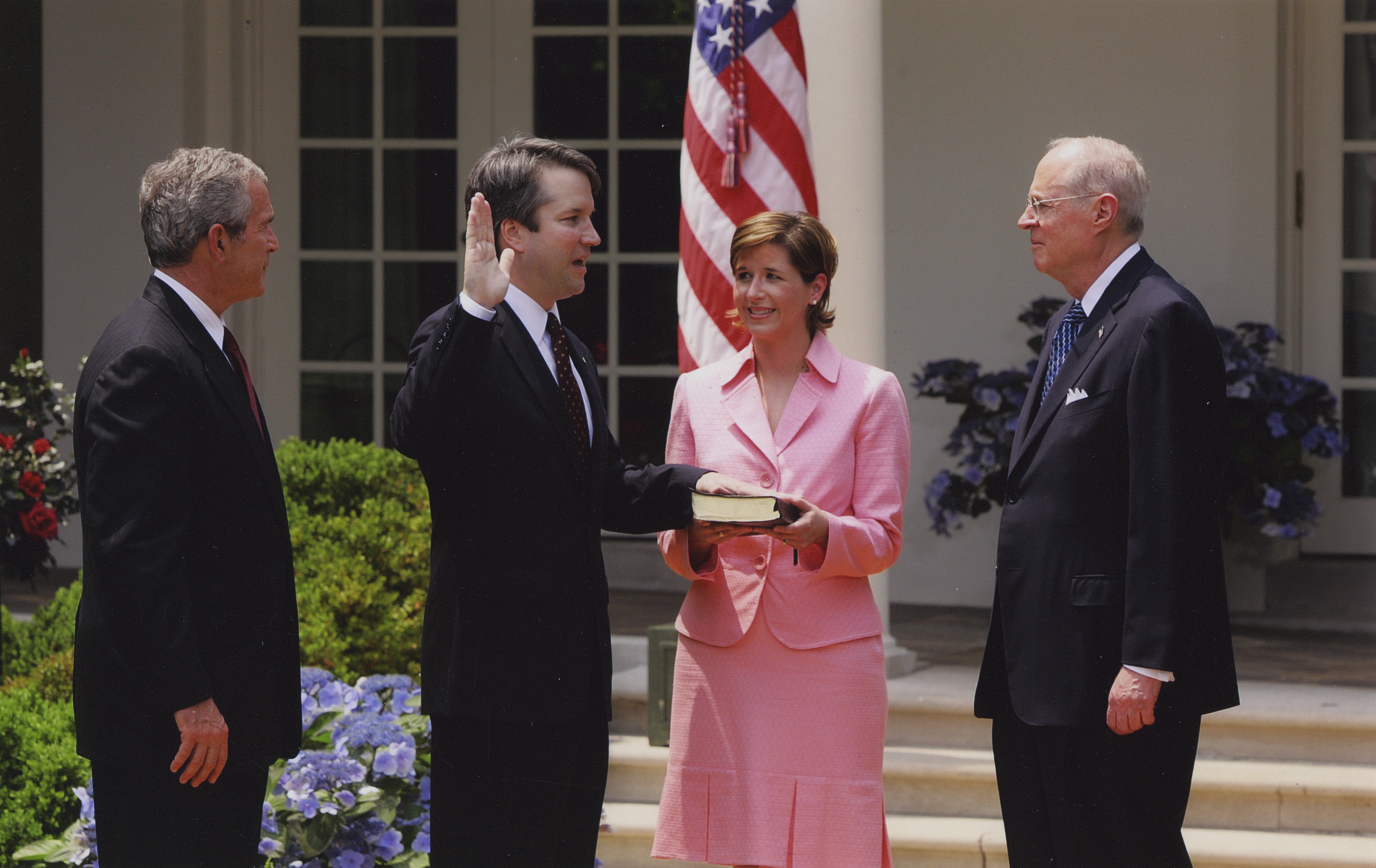
Kavanaugh is sworn into the D.C. Circuit by Justice Anthony Kennedy as his wife holds the Bible and President Bush looks on, 2006. Coincidentally, Kavanaugh would be sworn into the U.S. Supreme Court 12 years later as Kennedy's replacement.

President George W. Bush nominated Kavanaugh to the United States Court of Appeals for the District of Columbia Circuit on July 25, 2003, but his nomination stalled in the Senate for nearly three years. Democratic senators accused him of being too partisan, with Senator Dick Durbin calling him the "Forrest Gump of Republican politics". In 2003, the American Bar Association had rated Kavanaugh "well qualified" (its highest category), but after doing dozens more interviews in 2006, downgraded him to "qualified".

The Senate Judiciary Committee recommended he be confirmed on a 10–8 party-line vote on May 11, 2006, and he was confirmed by the Senate on May 26 by a vote of 57–36. Kavanaugh was sworn in on June 1. He was the fourth judge nominated to the District of Columbia Circuit by Bush and confirmed. Kavanaugh began hearing cases on September 11 and had his formal investiture on September 27.

In July 2007, senators Patrick Leahy and Dick Durbin accused Kavanaugh of lying to the Judiciary Committee when he denied being involved in formulating the Bush administration's detention and interrogation policies. In 2002, Kavanaugh had told other White House lawyers that he believed Supreme Court justice Anthony Kennedy would not approve of denying legal counsel to prisoners detained as enemy combatants. The issue reemerged in July 2018 after Kavanaugh was nominated to the Supreme Court.

=== Notable cases ===
On the 14 occasions on which Kavanaugh authored opinions that were considered by the Supreme Court, the Court adopted his position 13 times and reversed his position once. These included cases involving environmental regulations, criminal procedure, the separation of powers and extraterritorial jurisdiction in human rights abuse cases. He was regarded as a feeder judge.

==== Abortion ====
In the October 2017 decision Garza v. Hargan, Kavanaugh joined an unsigned, divided panel of the District of Columbia Circuit in holding that the Office of Refugee Resettlement does not violate an unaccompanied alien minor's constitutional right to an abortion by requiring that she first be appointed a sponsor before traveling to obtain the abortion, provided "the process of securing a sponsor to whom the minor is released occurs expeditiously". Days later, the en banc District of Columbia Circuit reversed that judgment, with Kavanaugh dissenting. In his dissent, he criticized the majority for creating "a new right for unlawful immigrant minors in United States government detention to obtain immediate abortion on demand". The girl then obtained an abortion. In 2018, in a follow-up petition from the Solicitor General of the United States, the United States Supreme Court vacated the en banc District of Columbia Circuit's judgment and the girl's claim was ultimately dismissed as moot and does not serve as precedent.

==== Affordable Care Act ====
In November 2011, Kavanaugh dissented when the District of Columbia Circuit upheld the Patient Protection and Affordable Care Act (ACA), arguing that the court lacked jurisdiction in the case. In his dissent, he compared the individual mandate to a tax. After a unanimous panel found that the ACA did not violate the Constitution's Origination Clause in Sissel v. United States Department of Health & Human Services (2014), Kavanaugh wrote a long dissent from the denial of rehearing en banc. In May 2015, he dissented from a decision that denied an en banc rehearing of Priests for Life v. HHS, in which the panel upheld the ACA's contraceptive mandate accommodations against Priests for Life's Religious Freedom Restoration Act claims. In Zubik v. Burwell (2016), the Supreme Court vacated the circuit's judgment in a per curiam decision.

==== Appointments Clause and separation of powers ====
In August 2008, Kavanaugh dissented when the District of Columbia Circuit found that the Constitution's Appointments Clause did not prevent the Sarbanes–Oxley Act from creating a board whose members were not directly removable by the president. In Free Enterprise Fund v. Public Company Accounting Oversight Board (2010), the Supreme Court reversed the circuit court's judgment by a vote of 5–4.

In 2015, Kavanaugh found that those directly regulated by the Consumer Financial Protection Bureau (CFPB) could challenge the constitutionality of its design. In October 2016, he wrote for a divided panel finding that the CFPB's design was unconstitutional, and made the CFPB director removable by the president of the United States. In January 2018, the en banc District of Columbia Circuit reversed that judgment by a vote of 7–3, over Kavanaugh's dissent.

==== Environmental regulation ====
In 2013, Kavanaugh issued an extraordinary writ of mandamus requiring the Nuclear Regulatory Commission to process the license application of the Yucca Mountain nuclear waste repository, over the dissent of Judge Merrick Garland. In April 2014, Kavanaugh dissented when the court found that Labor Secretary Tom Perez could issue workplace safety citations against SeaWorld regarding the multiple killings of its workers by Tilikum, an orca.

After Kavanaugh wrote for a divided panel striking down a Clean Air Act regulation, the Supreme Court reversed by a vote of 6–2 in EPA v. EME Homer City Generation, L.P. (2014). Kavanaugh dissented from the denial of rehearing en banc of a unanimous panel opinion upholding the agency's regulation of greenhouse gas emissions and the Supreme Court reversed by a vote of 5–4 in Utility Air Regulatory Group v. Environmental Protection Agency (2014). After Kavanaugh dissented from a per curiam decision allowing the agency to disregard cost–benefit analysis, the Supreme Court reversed by a vote of 5–4 in Michigan v. EPA (2015).

==== Extraterritorial jurisdiction ====
In Doe v. Exxon Mobil Corp. (2007), Kavanaugh dissented when the circuit court allowed a lawsuit making accusations of ExxonMobil human rights violations in Indonesia to proceed, arguing that the claims were not justiciable. He dissented again when the circuit court later found that the corporation could be sued under the Alien Tort Statute of 1789.

==== First Amendment and free speech ====
Kavanaugh wrote for unanimous three-judge district courts when they held that the Bipartisan Campaign Reform Act could restrict soft money donations to political parties and forbid campaign contributions by foreign citizens. The Supreme Court summarily affirmed both those judgments on direct appeal.

In 2014, Kavanaugh concurred in the judgment when the en banc District of Columbia Circuit found that the Free Speech Clause did not forbid the government from requiring meatpackers to include a country of origin label on their products. In United States Telecom Ass'n v. FCC (2016), he dissented when the en banc circuit refused to rehear a rejected challenge to the net neutrality rule, writing, "Congress did not clearly authorize the FCC to issue the net neutrality rule."

==== Fourth Amendment and civil liberties ====
In November 2010, Kavanaugh dissented from the denial of rehearing en banc after the circuit found that attaching a Global Positioning System tracking device to a vehicle violated the Fourth Amendment to the United States Constitution. The Supreme Court then affirmed the circuit's judgment in United States v. Jones (2012). In February 2016, Kavanaugh dissented when the en banc circuit refused to rehear police officers' rejected claims of qualified immunity for arresting partygoers in a vacant house. The Supreme Court unanimously reversed the circuit's judgment in District of Columbia v. Wesby (2018).

In Klayman v. Obama (2015), Kavanaugh concurred when the circuit court denied an en banc rehearing of its decision to vacate a district court order blocking the National Security Agency's warrantless bulk collection of telephony metadata, writing that the metadata collection was not a search, and even if it were, no reasonable suspicion would be required because of the government's special need to prevent terrorist attacks.

==== National security ====
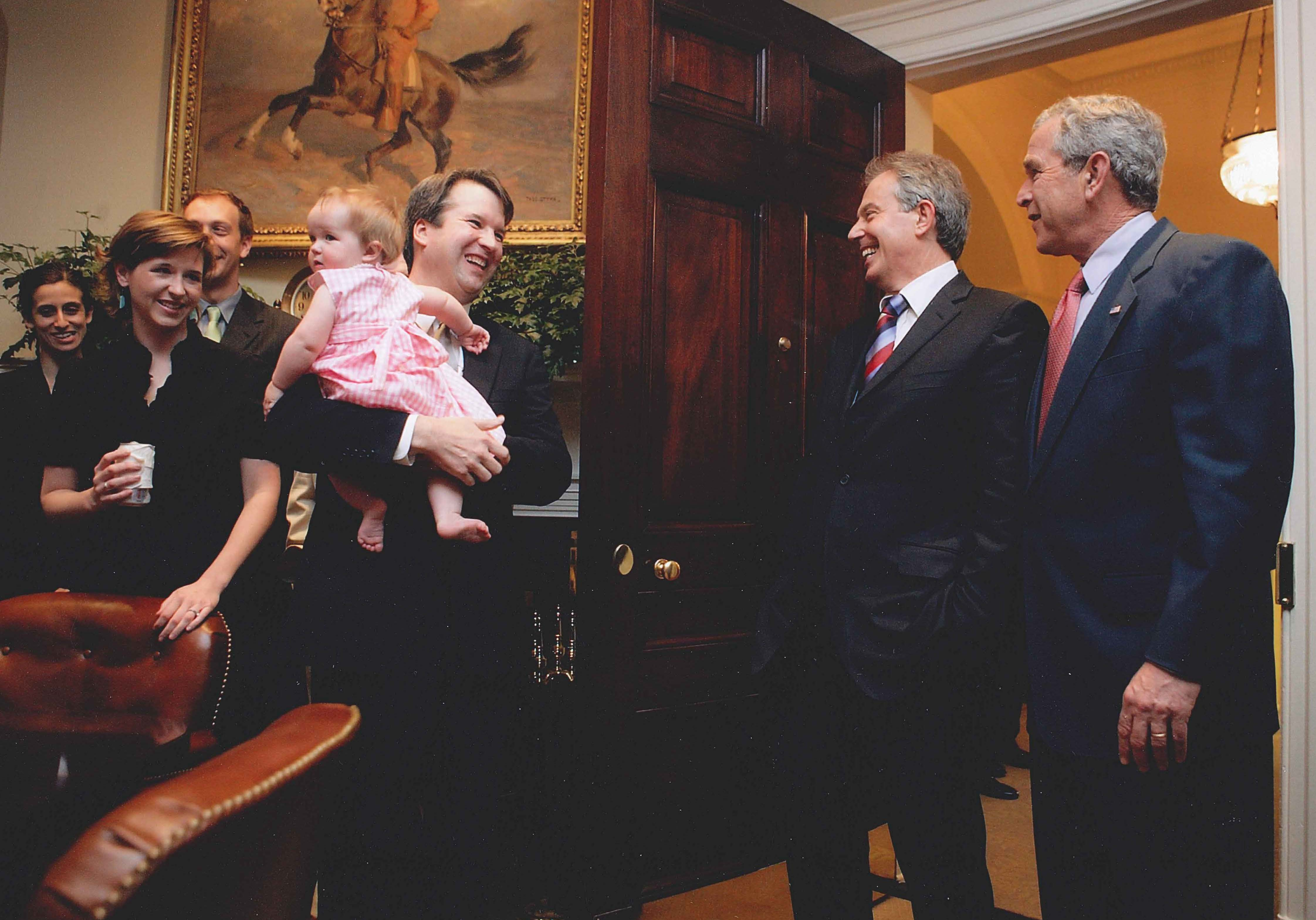
Kavanaugh holds his daughter while greeting British prime minister Tony Blair and President George W. Bush.

In April 2009, Kavanaugh wrote a long concurrence when the court found that detainees at the Guantanamo Bay detention camp had no right to advance notice before being transferred to another country. In Kiyemba v. Bush (2010), the Supreme Court vacated that judgment while refusing to review the matter. In June 2010, Kavanaugh wrote a concurrence in judgment when the en banc District of Columbia Circuit found that the Al-Shifa pharmaceutical factory owners could not bring a defamation suit regarding the government's allegations that they were terrorists. In October 2012, he wrote for a unanimous court when it found that the Constitution's Ex Post Facto Clause made it unlawful for the government to prosecute Salim Hamdan under the Military Commissions Act of 2006 on charges of providing material support for terrorism. In August 2010, Kavanaugh wrote a lengthy concurrence when the en banc circuit refused to rehear Ghaleb Nassar Al Bihani's rejected claims that the international law of war limits the Authorization for Use of Military Force Against Terrorists. In 2014, he concurred in the judgment when the en banc circuit found that Ali al-Bahlul could be retroactively convicted of war crimes, provided the existing statute already made it a crime "because it does not alter the definition of the crime, the defenses or the punishment". In October 2016, Kavanaugh wrote the plurality opinion when the en banc circuit found al-Bahlul could be convicted by a military commission even if his offenses are not internationally recognized as war crimes. In Meshal v. Higgenbotham (2016), Kavanaugh concurred when the divided panel threw out a claim by an American that he had been disappeared by the FBI in a Kenyan black site.

==== Second Amendment and gun ownership ====
In October 2011, Kavanaugh dissented when the circuit court found that a ban on the sale of semi-automatic rifles was permissible under the Second Amendment. This case followed the landmark Supreme Court ruling District of Columbia v. Heller (2008).

==== Vaccine regulation ====
In March 2012, Kavanaugh wrote the opinion in Coalition for Mercury-Free Drugs v. Sebelius, holding that opponents of thimerosal-preserved vaccines lacked standing to challenge determinations by the Food and Drug Administration that vaccines and their components are safe and effective. SCOTUSblog provided the case as an example of the fact that "[e]ven when Kavanaugh rejects a claim, he sometimes uses his discussion of standing to show that he has heard the plaintiff's argument and taken it seriously". Bloomberg wrote, "Kavanaugh's opinion for the court repeatedly went out of its way to show it respected the Coalition for Mercury-Free Drugs's (CoMeD) 'genuine concern' regarding thimerosal", but nevertheless "said the coalition was required to seek a ban through the executive or legislative branches".

=== Law clerk hiring practices ===
Twenty-five of Kavanaugh's 48 law clerks have been women, and 13 people of color. Some have been children of other judges and high-profile legal figures, including Clayton Kozinski (son of former federal Judge Alex Kozinski), Porter Wilkinson (daughter of Judge J. Harvie Wilkinson III), Philip Alito (son of Justice Samuel Alito), Sophia Chua-Rubenfeld (daughter of Yale Law professors Amy Chua and Jed Rubenfeld), and Emily Chertoff (daughter of former DHS secretary Michael Chertoff).

On September 20, 2018, The Guardian reported that two Yale professors had advised female law students at Yale that their physical appearance and femininity could play a role in securing a clerkship with Kavanaugh. Rubenfeld said that Kavanaugh "hires women with a certain look" but did not say what that "look" was. Unnamed sources reported that Chua said that female applicants should exude "model-like" femininity and "dress outgoing" in job interviews with Kavanaugh. Responding to the report, Chua denied that Kavanaugh's hiring decisions were affected by female applicants' attractiveness, saying, "Judge Kavanaugh's first and only litmus test in hiring has been excellence." Yale Law School Dean Heather Gerken announced an investigation of the matter, but Yale did not find any cause for sanction. Chua returned to regular teaching in 2019.

== Nomination to the Supreme Court of the United States ==
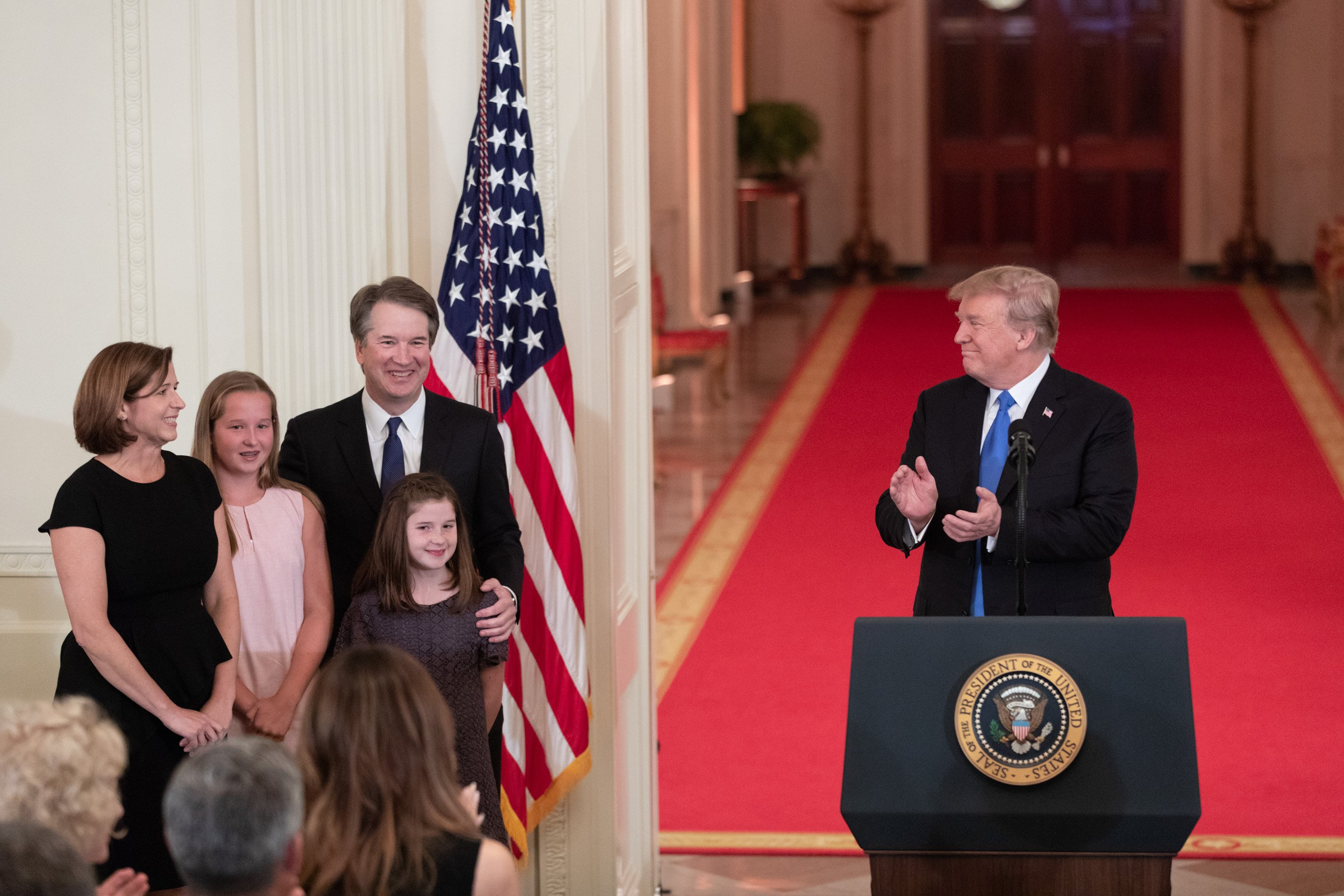
Kavanaugh and his family with President Donald Trump on July 9, 2018

On July 2, 2018, Kavanaugh was one of four United States Court of Appeals judges to receive a personal 45-minute interview by President Donald Trump as a potential replacement for Justice Anthony Kennedy. On July 9, Trump nominated Kavanaugh to the Supreme Court. In his first public speech after the nomination, Kavanaugh said, "No president has ever consulted more widely or talked with more people from more backgrounds to seek input about a Supreme Court nomination."

=== Legal philosophy and approach ===
A statistical analysis by The Washington Post estimated that Kavanaugh was more conservative than Neil Gorsuch and less conservative than Samuel Alito. Jonathan Turley of George Washington University wrote that among the judges Trump considered, "Kavanaugh has the most robust view of presidential powers and immunities". Brian Bennett, writing for Time magazine, cited Kavanaugh's 2009 Minnesota Law Review article defending the president's immunity from prosecution while in office. In a 2017 speech at the American Enterprise Institute about former chief justice William Rehnquist, Kavanaugh praised Rehnquist's dissents in Roe v. Wade, which ruled abortion bans unconstitutional, and Furman v. Georgia, which ruled all existing death penalty statutes unconstitutional. Two law professors evaluated Kavanaugh's appellate court decisions for the Washington Post, rating his decisions in four areas: rights of criminal defendants; support for rules regarding stricter enforcement of environmental protection; upholding the rights of labor unions; and siding with those bringing suits alleging discrimination. They found he had the most conservative voting record on the District of Columbia Circuit in three of those policy areas, and the second-most in the fourth, between 2003 and 2018.

During his hearing, Kavanaugh said that he had often said the four greatest moments in Supreme Court history were Brown v. Board of Education, Marbury v. Madison, Youngstown Steel, and United States v. Nixon, with Brown the single greatest.

According to the Judicial Common Space scores, a score based on the ideology scores of the home state senators and the president who nominated the judge to the federal bench, Clarence Thomas was the only justice more conservative than Kavanaugh. By this metric, Kavanaugh's confirmation shifted the court to the right. Had Barack Obama's nominee Merrick Garland been confirmed in 2016, Stephen Breyer would have become the median swing vote when Kennedy retired. But since Antonin Scalia was replaced by another conservative (Gorsuch), it was expected that Chief Justice John Roberts would become the median swing vote on the Supreme Court upon Kavanaugh's confirmation.

=== Senate Judiciary Committee public hearings ===
The Senate Judiciary Committee scheduled three or four days of public hearings on Kavanaugh's nomination, commencing on September 4, 2018. The hearings were delayed at the onset by objections from the Democratic members about the absence of records of Kavanaugh's time in the George W. Bush administration. The Democrats also complained that 42,000 pages of documents had been received only the night before the first day of hearings. Republicans asserted that the volume of documents available on Kavanaugh equaled that of the previous five nominees to the court; the Democrats responded that only 15% of the documents they had requested about Kavanaugh had been provided. Numerous motions by the Democrats to adjourn or suspend the hearings were ruled out of order by Chairman Chuck Grassley, who argued that Kavanaugh had written over 300 legal opinions available for review. The first day's session closed after statements from each senator and the nominee, with question-and-answer periods to begin the next day.

During the first round of questions from senators on September 5, 2018, Kavanaugh held to his earlier stated position that he would not express an opinion on matters that might come before the Court. He thus refused to promise to recuse himself from any case, including any that might involve Trump. He also declined to comment on coverage of preexisting healthcare conditions, semiautomatic rifle possession, Roe v. Wade, or the president's power to self-pardon. He expounded at length on various Constitutional amendments, stare decisis (the role of legal precedent in shaping subsequent judicial rulings), and the president's power to dismiss federal employees. As in the previous session, there were frequent outbursts of protest in the audience, requiring security intervention and removal, as well as repeated procedural objections by Democrats.

The committee's third day of hearings began with a furor over the release of emails by Kavanaugh related to concern about potential racial profiling in security screenings. The day continued with Kavanaugh's attempts to articulate his jurisprudence, including refusing to answer direct questions about matters he called hypothetical. Senator Chris Coons had tendered Kavanaugh written questions about any knowledge of inappropriate behavior on the part of judge Alex Kozinski, for whom Kavanaugh had clerked, including his circulations of sexually explicit emails via his "Easy Rider Gag List". According to The Intercept, though Coons had asked him to review his emails from Kozinski, Kavanaugh replied, "I do not remember". During his testimony, Kavanaugh said that Kozinski's 2017 exposure as an alleged prolific sexual harasser was a surprising "gut punch". The Guardian reported that their sources disputed Kavanaugh's account because Kozinski's alleged behavior was reportedly widely known among those in the judicial system and its exposure culminated in his abrupt resignation from the bench.

The committee released a 2003 email in which Kavanaugh said, "I am not sure that all legal scholars refer to [Roe v. Wade] as the settled law of the land at the Supreme Court level since Court can always overrule its precedent, and three current justices on the Court would do so." Kavanaugh stressed that he was commenting on the views of legal scholars at the time, not his own views, and noted that the case had been reaffirmed on a number of occasions since 2003. Senator Susan Collins indicated that Kavanaugh's statement did not contradict his personal assurance to her that Roe is settled law. Kavanaugh noted that Planned Parenthood v. Casey (1992), which reaffirmed Roe v. Wade, was "precedent on precedent". According to Kavanaugh, Casey is a key decision about when the Court's precedent may be overturned.

On September 27, the committee held an additional day of public hearings to discuss allegations that Kavanaugh engaged in sexual misconduct while in high school. The only witnesses were Kavanaugh and Christine Blasey Ford, his accuser. Republican members of the committee did not question Ford directly; questioning on their behalf was done by Rachel Mitchell, a career prosecutor from Maricopa County, Arizona. Grassley cut her questioning short, after which the Republican members of the committee questioned him themselves. Alternating with their questions, Democratic members of the committee questioned Ford and Kavanaugh. Ford repeated and expanded upon her earlier allegations, saying that Kavanaugh and his friend Mark Judge, both "visibly drunk", had locked her into a bedroom, where Kavanaugh groped her and tried to take off her clothes while Judge watched. She said she "believed he was going to rape me" and feared for her life when he held his hand over her mouth. In his opening statement, Kavanaugh claimed the accusations were a "political hit" by left-wing activists and Democrats, saying he faced retaliation "on behalf of the Clintons" for his work on the Starr Report against Bill Clinton. Leland Keyser, Ford's friend who Ford said was present during the alleged attack, has denied that it took place, and questioned certain aspects of the story. Keyser also stated she felt pressured by people to support Ford's story, something she told the FBI about. In response to his testimony, more than 2,400 law professors signed a letter saying that the Senate should not confirm him because "he did not display the impartiality and judicial temperament requisite to sit on the highest court of our land."

=== Sexual assault allegations ===
==== Christine Blasey Ford ====
In early July 2018, Kavanaugh's name was on a shortlist of nominees for the Supreme Court. Christine Blasey Ford, a psychology professor at Palo Alto University, contacted a Washington Post tipline and her United States Representative, Anna Eshoo, with accusations that Kavanaugh had sexually assaulted her when they were in high school. On July 30, 2018, Ford wrote to Senator Dianne Feinstein to inform her of her accusation against Kavanaugh, requesting that it be kept confidential. After a September 12 report in The Intercept, Feinstein confirmed that a complaint had been made against Kavanaugh by a woman who had requested not to be identified. Feinstein said that the woman had claimed that, when they were both in high school, Kavanaugh had tried to force himself on her while she was being physically restrained. The same day, Feinstein said she had forwarded the woman's accusation to federal authorities.

On September 16, Ford publicized her allegations and claimed Kavanaugh had sexually assaulted her when she was 15 and he was 17. She said that in the early 1980s, Kavanaugh and Mark Judge, one of Kavanaugh's friends from Georgetown Prep, corralled her in a bedroom at a house party in Maryland and turned up the music playing in the room. According to Ford, Kavanaugh pinned her to the bed, groped her, ground against her, tried to pull off her clothes, and covered her mouth with his hand when she tried to scream. Ford said she was afraid that Kavanaugh might inadvertently kill her during the attack, and believed he was going to rape her. Ford stated that she escaped when Judge jumped on the bed, knocking them all to the floor.

Kavanaugh issued the following statement through the White House: "I categorically and unequivocally deny this allegation. I did not do this back in high school or at any time." Republicans criticized the decision to withhold "a vague, anonymous accusation for months" before releasing it on the "eve of [Kavanaugh's] confirmation" as an attempt to delay his confirmation hearings. Kavanaugh released a statement on the evening before his and Ford's scheduled testimony before the Senate Judiciary Committee. He said that due to the serious nature of the allegations, both he and Ford deserved to be heard. He also stated, "I am innocent of this charge."

On September 19, the Senate Judiciary Committee invited Kavanaugh and Ford to testify about the allegation. Kavanaugh agreed to testify on September 19. Ford requested that the FBI investigate the matter first, but Judiciary Committee chair Chuck Grassley declined the request, and gave Ford a deadline of September 21 to inform the committee whether she intended to testify. He added that Ford was welcome to appear before the committee privately or publicly. On September 20, Ford's attorney opened negotiations with the committee to reschedule the hearing under "terms that are fair and which ensure her safety". A bipartisan Judiciary Committee panel and Ford's representatives agreed to a hearing after September 24.

Ford stated that Leland Ingham Keyser, a lifelong friend, was present at the party where the alleged assault took place. On September 22, Keyser stated through her attorney that she did not know Kavanaugh and had no memory of the party or a sexual assault. The attorney did confirm that Keyser was a friend of Ford's, and Keyser told The Washington Post that she believed Ford's allegation.

On October 4, 2018, the White House announced that it had found no corroboration of Ford's allegation after reviewing the FBI's latest probe into Kavanaugh's past. Her attorneys tweeted, "Those directing the FBI investigation were not interested in seeking the truth."

In September 2019, New York Times reporters Kate Kelly and Robin Pogrebin published The Education of Brett Kavanaugh: An Investigation. They reported that Keyser "thought the whole setup Ford described ... sounded wrong", and that she "challenged Ford's accuracy", quoting Keyser as saying, "I don't have any confidence in the story". According to The Washington Post, the book revealed that "Keyser also said she spoke with many people who 'wanted me to remember something different'—suggesting that there was pressure on her to toe the line [against Kavanaugh]". Keyser felt she was being pressured to alter her story via veiled threats of exposing her "addictive tendencies". Despite Keyser's doubts, Kelly and Pogrebin concluded that the allegations against Kavanaugh were ultimately credible.

==== Deborah Ramirez ====
On September 23, 2018, Ronan Farrow and Jane Mayer of The New Yorker published an article with another sexual assault allegation against Kavanaugh. Deborah Ramirez, who attended Yale University with Kavanaugh, alleged he exposed himself to her and thrust his penis against her face after they had both been drinking at a college party during the 1983–84 academic year. Kavanaugh said, "This alleged event from 35 years ago did not happen." The New Yorker spoke to four classmates, three identified as eyewitnesses but all denied witnessing the event. The New York Times interviewed several dozen of Ramirez's classmates in an attempt to corroborate her story, and could find no firsthand witnesses to the alleged assault, but several classmates recalled that they had heard about it in the subsequent days and believed Ramirez. According to The New York Times, "Ramirez herself told the press and friends that, initially, she was not absolutely certain it was Kavanaugh who assaulted her, but after corresponding with friends who had secondhand knowledge of the incident, and taking time to refresh her recollection, stated that she was certain Kavanaugh was her assailant." The Washington Post analyzed Ramirez's allegation and concluded, "Ramirez's accusation has the dual distinction of having more potential corroboration and less actual corroboration than Ford's".

==== Julie Swetnick ====
Attorney Michael Avenatti tweeted on September 23, 2018, that he represented a woman who had "credible information" about Kavanaugh and Judge. Avenatti said his client would be willing to testify before the Senate Judiciary Committee. On September 26, Avenatti revealed the woman to be Julie Swetnick, a former government employee. In a sworn statement, Swetnick described attending "well over ten house parties in the Washington, D.C. area during the years 1981–1983 where Mark Judge and Brett Kavanaugh were present". She described witnessing efforts by Mark Judge and Brett Kavanaugh to cause girls to become inebriated so they could be gang raped. Kavanaugh called her allegations "ridiculous" and Avenatti's allegation as a whole a "farce". The Wall Street Journal reported that it had contacted "dozens" of her former classmates and colleagues but failed to reach anyone with knowledge of her allegations and that none of her friends had come forward publicly to support her claims. In an interview with NBC News, Swetnick clarified that she did not personally witness Kavanaugh or Judge spike any drinks, and accused Avenatti of twisting her words. She further clarified that she did not personally witness efforts by Kavanaugh or Judge to cause girls to become inebriated so they could be gang raped. Swetnick provided NBC News with the names of friends who attended the parties, but none could corroborate her claims, while some said they did not know her. Grassley referred Swetnick and Avenatti to the Justice Department for criminal investigation regarding claims that they engaged in "conspiracy, false statements and obstruction of Congress".

==== Judy Munro-Leighton ====
On September 19, Judy Munro-Leighton accused Kavanaugh of sexual assault in an anonymous letter signed "Jane Doe", which was addressed to Grassley but mailed to Senator Kamala Harris. On September 26, the Senate committee interrogated Kavanaugh about this accusation. Kavanaugh called the accusation "ridiculous". On November 1, Munro-Leighton talked to committee staff members. During the conversation she changed her story, denying that she had penned the anonymous letter and saying she had contacted Congress as "a ploy" to "get attention". On November 2, Grassley announced Munro-Leighton's identity, and described her accusations as fabricated. She was referred to the Department of Justice and FBI for making false accusations and obstructing justice.

==== FBI investigation and ethics complaints ====
At the conclusion of the hearing, the Republican leadership of the committee indicated that they planned to hold a committee vote on the nomination the next day, September 28, with a procedural vote on the Senate floor on September 29. On September 28, the committee voted along party lines to advance the nomination to the full Senate; Senator Jeff Flake's vote in support was conditioned on delaying the vote in the full Senate for a week to allow the FBI to investigate Ford's claims. Later, Senators Joe Manchin and Lisa Murkowski also said they would not vote to confirm without an FBI investigation. On this request from the Judiciary Committee, Trump ordered a "supplemental investigation to update Judge Kavanaugh's file", to be limited in scope and completed within a week. The report was transmitted to the White House on October 3 and from there to the Senate on October 4, where senators were permitted to review the report one at a time in secrecy. On October 5, the Judiciary Committee reported that it found "no corroboration of the allegations" against Kavanaugh. Majority Leader Mitch McConnell said the Senate would vote on the confirmation on October 6. Democrats called the FBI investigation incomplete, a "farce", a "sham", and "a horrific cover-up" that omitted key witnesses at the White House's direction. According to The Washington Post, the White House stopped the FBI from investigating possible falsehoods in Kavanaugh's testimony to Congress about his drinking habits during his youth.

Eighty-three ethics complaints were brought against Kavanaugh regarding his conduct during his Supreme Court confirmation hearings. Chief Justice Roberts appointed a special federal panel of judges to investigate them. In December 2018, the panel dismissed all the complaints, calling them "serious" but deciding that lower court judges have no authority to investigate Supreme Court justices.

==== 2023 Justice film ====
Doug Liman's 2023 documentary Justice recounts the sexual assault allegations against Kavanaugh, including the testimony of Ford and Ramirez. It features a never-before-heard audio recording made by Partnership for Public Service president and CEO Max Stier, a Yale colleague of Kavanaugh's, that corroborates Ramirez's charges and suggests that Kavanaugh violated another unnamed woman. Stier says that he witnessed Kavanaugh with his pants down with a group of rowdy soccer players forcing a drunk female freshman to hold Kavanaugh's penis. Stier also says that he had heard from classmates about Ramirez's similar encounter with Kavanaugh, which she describes in the film. As of May 2025, the film has yet to be scheduled for a wide release.

=== Fondness for beer ===
During his hearings, Kavanaugh declared his fondness for beer several times. "I drank beer with my friends...Sometimes I had too many beers... I liked beer. I still like beer." He repeatedly asked Senator Sheldon Whitehouse whether he shared his fondness for beer and later apologized to Senator Amy Klobuchar for asking whether she had experienced a blackout. President Trump expressed surprise at "how vocal he was about the fact that he likes beer".

=== Senate action ===
On October 5, the Senate voted 51–49 to invoke cloture, advancing the nomination to a final floor vote expected on October 6. This was enabled through the application of the so-called "nuclear option", or a simple majority vote, rather than the historical three-fifths supermajority in place before April 2017. The vote was along party lines, with the exception of Democrat Joe Manchin voting yes and Republican Lisa Murkowski voting no.

On October 6, the Senate confirmed Kavanaugh to the Supreme Court by a 50–48 vote. One senator, Republican Steve Daines, who supported the nomination, was absent during the vote due to his attendance at his daughter's wedding that day, and Murkowski voted "present" despite her opposition so that their votes would cancel out and the balance of the vote would be retained—a rarely used traditional courtesy known as a "pair between senators". All Republicans except Daines and Murkowski voted to confirm Kavanaugh, and all Democrats except Joe Manchin voted not to. Kavanaugh's confirmation vote was historically close. The only Supreme Court confirmation that was closer was the vote on Stanley Matthews, nominated by President James A. Garfield in 1881. Matthews was confirmed by a single vote, 24–23; no other justice has been confirmed by a single vote. In percentage terms, Kavanaugh's vote was even closer than Matthews's. Matthews received 51.06% of the vote to Kavanaugh's 51.02%.

=== Swearing-in ===
Kavanaugh was sworn in as the 114th justice of the Supreme Court on the evening of October 6, 2018. The Constitutional Oath was administered by Chief Justice Roberts and the Judicial Oath was administered by Kennedy, whom Kavanaugh succeeded on the Court. This private ceremony was followed by a public ceremony at the White House on October 8. Upon joining the Court, Kavanaugh became the first Supreme Court justice to hire an all-female team of law clerks.

== United States Supreme Court (2018–present) ==
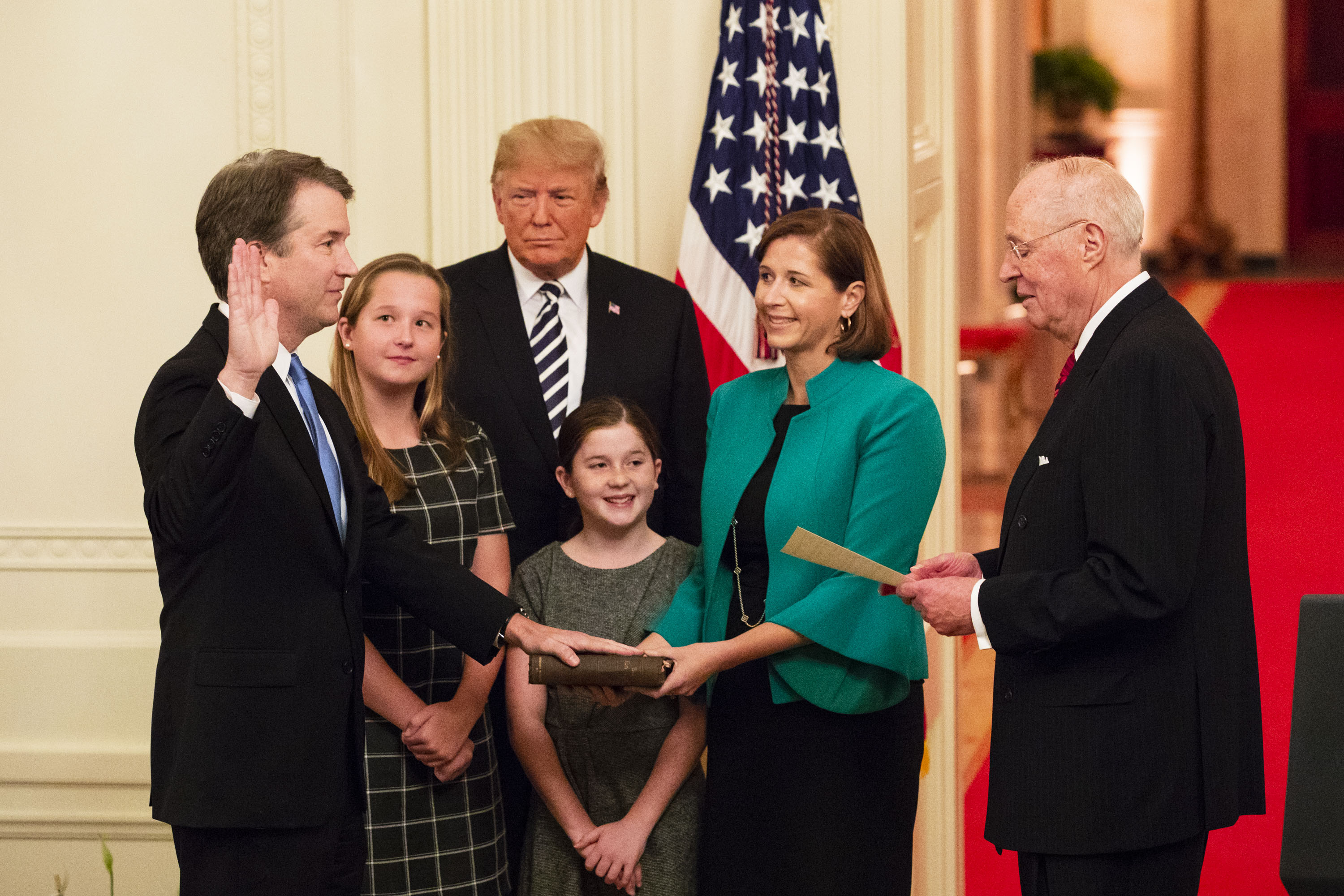
Kavanaugh being sworn in to succeed Anthony Kennedy as an associate justice on October 8, 2018

Kavanaugh began his tenure as Supreme Court justice on October 9, 2018, hearing arguments for Stokeling v. United States and United States v. Stitt.

=== Circuit assignment ===
In November 2020, Kavanaugh was reassigned to both the Sixth Circuit and the Eighth Circuit. He had previously been assigned to the Seventh Circuit, which covers federal courts in Illinois, Indiana, and Wisconsin. Circuit justices are principally responsible for responding to emergency requests (for example, applications for emergency stays of executions) that arise from the circuit's jurisdiction, either by the assigned justice alone or else by the justice's referring them to the full Court for review.

=== Early decisions ===
Kavanaugh wrote his first Supreme Court opinion on January 8, 2019, in Henry Schein, Inc. v. Archer & White Sales, Inc., a unanimous decision reversing an appeals court opinion that had allowed a court to decide whether an issue in a contract between a dental equipment manufacturer and distributor should be decided by arbitration.

On February 27, Kavanaugh joined Roberts and the court's liberal justices in Garza v. Idaho, a case in which the Court held that the Sixth Amendment's presumption of prejudice resulting from ineffective assistance of counsel applies to situations in which an attorney declines to file an appeal because an appeal waiver was signed as part of a plea agreement.

=== Abortion ===
In December 2018, as a swing vote, Kavanaugh joined Roberts and the Court's four more liberal justices to decline to hear cases brought by Louisiana and Kansas, which sought to block women from choosing to receive Medicaid-funded medical care from Planned Parenthood clinics. Two lower appeals courts had ruled that the federal law creating Medicaid protects patients' rights to choose any provider which is "qualified to perform" the needed services.

In February 2019, Kavanaugh joined three of his conservative colleagues in voting to reject a stay of a Louisiana law to restrict abortion. He issued his own dissenting opinion. CNBC reported that "Kavanaugh agreed [with three conservative justices], but wrote separately that he would be open to reconsidering the legality of the law if the dire warnings from abortion rights groups materialized." The Supreme Court decided this case, June Medical Services L. L. C. v. Russo, on June 29, 2020, striking down Louisiana's requirement for abortion providers to hold hospital admitting privileges. Kavanaugh dissented. In September 2021, by a 5–4 vote, the Court declined an emergency petition to temporarily block enforcement of the Texas Heartbeat Act, which bans nearly all abortions after six weeks of pregnancy. Kavanaugh was in the majority, joined by Thomas, Alito, Gorsuch, and Barrett. In June 2022, in Dobbs v. Jackson Women's Health Organization, Kavanaugh joined the same four justices in voting to completely overturn Roe v. Wade and Planned Parenthood v. Casey. Kavanaugh later wrote the opinion of the court in FDA v. Alliance for Hippocratic Medicine, ruling that AHM could not sue to prevent the Food and Drug Administration's approval of the abortion pill mifepristone without demonstrating that the drug's availability had caused them personal harm.

=== Capital punishment ===
Also in February, Kavanaugh was part of the majority in decisions relating to the death penalty. On February 7, 2019, he was part of the majority in a 5–4 decision rejecting a Muslim prisoner's request to delay his execution in order to have an imam present. On February 19, 2019, Kavanaugh joined Roberts and the Court's four liberal justices in a 6–3 decision blocking the execution of a man with an intellectual disability in Texas. In January 2022, he voted with the majority in a 5–4 decision to allow an execution to proceed in Alabama. In 2023 Kavanaugh wrote the majority opinion in Reed v. Goertz, ruling that Texas death row inmate Rodney Reed could seek DNA testing on evidence in his case despite the state's statute of limitations on such testing.

=== LGBT rights ===
On June 15, 2020, in Bostock v. Clayton County, the Supreme Court ruled 6–3 that the workplace nondiscrimination protections in Title VII of the Civil Rights Act of 1964 should be interpreted as protecting people on the basis of sexual orientation and gender identity. Kavanaugh wrote a dissent in which he argued that sexual orientation discrimination has always been understood as distinct from sex discrimination. He conceded that sexual orientation discrimination "may, as a very literal matter, entail making a distinction based on sex"; nonetheless, he said, "to fire one employee because she is a woman and another employee because he is gay implicates two distinct societal concerns, reveals two distinct biases, imposes two distinct harms, and falls within two distinct statutory prohibitions." He said that any change to the relevant law ought to be made by Congress, not by judges; and that "both the rule of law and democratic accountability badly suffer when a court adopts a hidden or obscure interpretation of the law, and not its ordinary meaning." Kavanaugh's dissent did not discuss gender identity or use the word "transgender", although transgender rights were at issue in the case. In a footnote, he wrote that his analysis "on the basis of sexual orientation would apply in much the same way to discrimination on the basis of gender identity." In October 2020, Kavanaugh agreed with the justices in an "apparently unanimous" decision to deny an appeal brought by Kim Davis, a county clerk who refused to issue marriage licenses to same-sex couples.

In 2021, Kavanaugh joined the majority opinion in Fulton v. City of Philadelphia, ruling in favor of a Catholic adoption and social service agency that had been denied funding by the City of Philadelphia because it does not place children for adoption with same-sex couples; the ruling also declined to overturn Employment Division v. Smith, "an important precedent limiting First Amendment protections for religious practices". The same month, Kavanaugh was among the six justices who rejected the appeal of a Washington State florist, whom lower courts had ruled violated non-discrimination laws by refusing to sell floral arrangements to a same-sex couple based on her religious beliefs against same-sex marriage, leaving the lower courts' judgments in place. In November 2021, Kavanaugh voted with the majority of justices in a 6–3 decision to decline to hear an appeal from Mercy San Juan Medical Center, a hospital affiliated with the Roman Catholic Church, which had sought to deny a hysterectomy to a transgender patient on religious grounds. Thomas, Alito, and Gorsuch dissented; because four votes are required to hear an appeal, the vote to reject the appeal left in place a lower court ruling in the patient's favor.

=== President Trump's taxes ===
In July 2020, in Trump v. Vance, the Supreme Court ruled in two 7–2 decisions that the Manhattan district attorney could access Trump's tax records, but that the issue of whether Congress could access the same records needed to be processed through the lower courts. Kavanaugh joined Roberts, Gorsuch, and the court's four Democratic appointees in the majority; Justices Thomas and Alito dissented. The rulings mean that the Manhattan DA will have access to the records while Congress does not, pending the outcome of the case in lower courts.

=== Voting rights ===
Eight days before the 2020 presidential election Kavanaugh concurred that absentee votes properly cast in Wisconsin but received after November 3 must be discarded, joining the Court's conservatives in a ruling that requires deferral to state officials on elections. On October 19, Kavanaugh voted to grant a request for a stay that would have prevented ballots sent before Election Day but delivered within three days after it from being counted. The Court was split 4–4, so the ruling by the Supreme Court of Pennsylvania requiring all votes to be counted stood, but the case may be reheard. Kavanaugh sided with Roberts and three liberal justices in a 5–3 majority to allow voting extension in North Carolina.

=== Compensation of college athletes ===
In his concurrence in National Collegiate Athletic Association v. Alston in June 2021, in which the Court ruled unanimously that college sports were not exempt from antitrust law, Kavanaugh called the NCAA "a massive money-raising enterprise on the backs of student athletes who are not fairly compensated." No one else, he said, could "not ... pay workers a fair market rate on the theory that their product is defined by not paying their workers a fair market rate." He said there were "serious questions" about other rules on compensation.

=== "Kavanaugh stops" ===
On July 2, 2025, the ACLU sued the Trump administration in federal court over the ongoing ICE raids in Los Angeles. On September 7, in Noem v. Vasquez Perdomo, the Supreme Court granted a stay, allowing the raids to continue. In a concurring opinion, Kavanaugh argued that while apparent ethnicity alone cannot justify a stop, it may be used as a factor along with others when assessing reasonable suspicion under the Fourth Amendment. Detentions based on the combination of such factors, including detentions of United States citizens and legal residents, have been called "Kavanaugh stops" by critics.

=== Assassination plots and threats ===
On June 8, 2022, 26-year-old Nicholas John Roske traveled from California to Kavanaugh's home in Maryland with plans to break into his home, murder Kavanaugh, and die by suicide. After arriving at Kavanaugh's residence, Roske called the police and was arrested, saying his attempt to murder Kavanaugh stemmed from dissatisfaction with the Supreme Court's leaked draft opinion in Dobbs v. Jackson Women's Health Organization, as well as the potential for the Court to loosen gun control laws under the Second Amendment. Roske was armed with a pistol, two magazines and ammunition, pepper spray, zip ties, a hammer, a screwdriver, a nail punch, a crowbar, a pistol light, duct tape, and other items. On April 8, 2025, Roske pleaded guilty to attempted murder of a United States Supreme Court justice. On October 3, 2025, United States district judge Deborah Boardman sentenced Roske to 97 months in prison and a lifetime of supervised release.

In September 2024, Panos Anastasiou of Alaska was arrested and charged with threatening to torture and assassinate six Supreme Court justices in 465 messages on a public court website. He was indicted on 22 counts, including nine counts of making threats against a federal judge and 13 counts of making threats in interstate commerce. In April 2026, Anastasiou accepted a deal to plead guilty, and could be sentenced to 10 years in prison.

== Teaching and scholarship ==
Kavanaugh taught full-term courses on separation of powers at Harvard Law School from 2008 to 2015, on the Supreme Court at Harvard Law School between 2014 and 2018, on National Security and Foreign Relations Law at Yale Law School in 2011, and on Constitutional Interpretation at Georgetown University Law Center in 2007. He was named the Samuel Williston Lecturer on Law at Harvard Law School in 2009. In 2008, Kavanaugh was hired as a visiting professor by Elena Kagan, then the dean of Harvard Law School. According to The Boston Globe, he was generous with his time and accessible, and quickly became a student favorite. He often dined in Cambridge with students and offered references and career advice. Kavanaugh received high evaluations from his students, including JD Vance. After the allegations of sexual misconduct against him, about 50 Harvard students filed formal complaints arguing that Kavanaugh's presence as a lecturer would violate the university's sexual harassment policies. Shortly thereafter, Kavanaugh voluntarily withdrew from teaching at Harvard for the 2019 winter semester. In the summer of 2019, he joined the faculty of George Mason University's Antonin Scalia Law School as a visiting professor, co-teaching a summer course in Runnymede, England, on the origins and creation of the United States Constitution.

In 2009, Kavanaugh wrote an article for the Minnesota Law Review in which he argued that Congress should exempt United States presidents from civil lawsuits while in office because, among other things, such lawsuits could be "time-consuming and distracting" for the president and would thus "ill serve the public interest, especially in times of financial or national security crisis". Kavanaugh argued that if a president "does something dastardly", they may be impeached by the House of Representatives, convicted by the Senate, and criminally prosecuted after leaving office. He asserted that the United States would have been better off if President Clinton could have "focused on Osama bin Laden without being distracted by the Paula Jones sexual harassment case and its criminal investigation offshoots". This article garnered attention in 2018 when Kavanaugh was nominated to the Supreme Court by Trump, whose 2016 presidential campaign was at the time the subject of a federal probe by Special Counsel Robert Mueller.

When reviewing a book on statutory interpretation by Second Circuit chief judge Robert Katzmann, Kavanaugh observed that judges often cannot agree on a statute if its text is ambiguous. To remedy this, he encouraged judges to first seek the "best reading" of the statute, through "interpreting the words of the statute" as well as the context of the statute as a whole, and only then apply other interpretive techniques that may justify an interpretation that differs from the "best meaning", such as constitutional avoidance, legislative history, and Chevron deference.

== Personal life ==
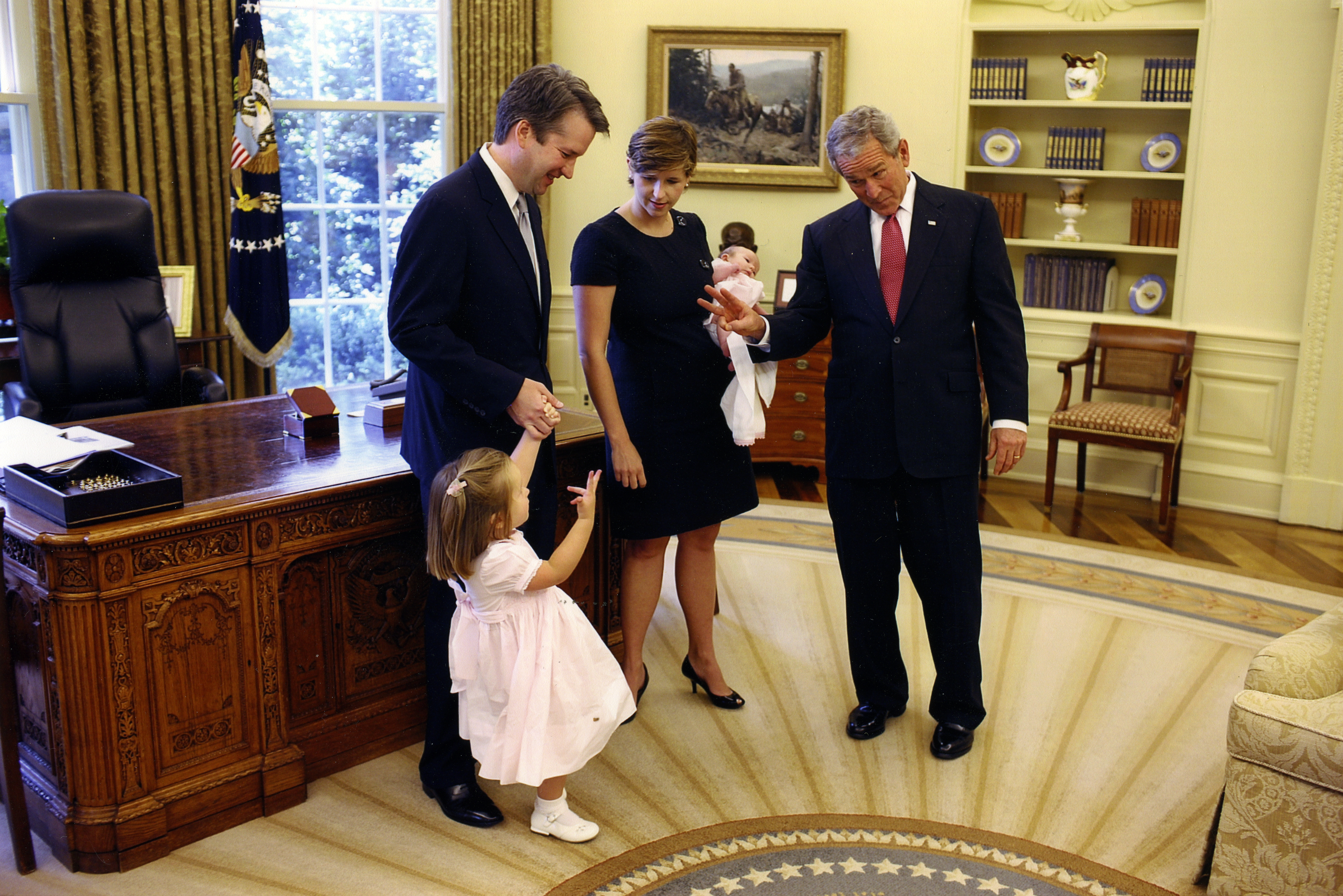
The Kavanaugh family with President Bush

Kavanaugh and Ashley Estes, the personal secretary to former president George W. Bush, married in 2004; the couple have two daughters. They live in Chevy Chase Section Five, Maryland.

Kavanaugh ran the Boston Marathon in 2010 and 2015. His bibs bore non-qualifying numbers, assigned for a charity or a "guest" rather than an age-based time qualifier. He also has completed many shorter races, from 5 kilometers to 10 miles.

Kavanaugh is a Roman Catholic and serves as a regular lector at the Shrine of the Most Blessed Sacrament in Washington, D.C. He has helped serve meals to the homeless as part of church programs, and has tutored at the Washington Jesuit Academy, a Catholic private school in the District of Columbia.

At his May 2006 confirmation hearing to the District of Columbia Circuit, he stated that he was a registered Republican. In 2018, Kavanaugh's reported salary was $220,600 as a federal judge and $27,000 as a lecturer at Harvard Law School.

In 2022, Kavanaugh's home was the site of protests following the leak of a draft majority opinion for the Supreme Court case Dobbs v. Jackson Women's Health Organization.

== Selected publications ==
Articles and book reviews

- Kavanaugh, Brett (1989). "Note: Defense Presence and Participation: A Procedural Minimum for Batson v. Kentucky Hearings". Yale Law Journal. 99: 187–207. doi:10.2307/796727. JSTOR 796727.
- Kavanaugh, Brett (1997–1998). "The President and the Independent Counsel" (PDF). The Georgetown Law Journal. 86: 2133–2178.
- Kavanaugh, Brett (2009). "Separation of Powers During the Forty-Fourth Presidency and Beyond" (PDF). Minnesota Law Review. 93: 1454–1484. A video of the lecture is available at the Star Tribune.
- Kavanaugh, Brett (2014). "Our Anchor for 225 Years and Counting: The Enduring Significance of the Precise Text of the Constitution". Notre Dame Law Review. 89: 1907–1928.
- Kavanaugh, Brett (2016). "Fixing Statutory Interpretation. Book Review: Judging Statutes. By Robert A. Katzmann. New York, N.Y.: Oxford University Press. 2014. Pp. xi, 171. $24.95" (PDF). Harvard Law Review. 129: 2118–2163. JSTOR 44072361.
- Kavanaugh, Brett (2016). "One Government, Three Branches, Five Controversies: Separation of Powers Under Presidents Bush and Obama" (PDF). Marquette Lawyer. 2016 (Fall): 9–19.
- Kavanaugh, Brett (November 29, 2017). "Congress and the President in Wartime: A review of David Barron's Waging War: The Clash Between Presidents and Congress, 1776 to ISIS (Simon & Schuster, 2016)". Lawfare. Archived from the original on November 21, 2020.

Op-eds

- Kavanaugh, Brett (February 26, 1999). "First Let Congress Do Its Job". The Washington Post. p. A27.
- Kavanaugh, Brett (July 1, 1999). "We All Supported Kenneth Starr". The Washington Post. p. A28. Archived from the original on November 21, 2020.
- Kavanaugh, Brett; Bittman, Robert J.; Wisenberg, Solomon L. (November 15, 1999). "To Us, Starr Is an American Hero". The Washington Post. p. A23. Archived from the original on November 21, 2020.
- Kavanaugh, Brett (August 1, 1999). "Letter to the Editor: Starr Report". The New York Times. p. 2 (Section 7). Archived from the original on November 21, 2020.
- Kavanaugh, Brett; Bittman, Robert J. (August 31, 1999). "Indictment of an Ex-President?". The Washington Post. p. A12. Archived (PDF) from the original on November 6, 2020.
- Kavanaugh, Brett (September 27, 1999). "Are Hawaiians Indians? The Justice Department Thinks So". The Wall Street Journal. p. A35.

Speeches and symposia

- Kavanaugh, Brett; Tyler, Amanda L.; Easterbrook, Frank H.; Lettow, Charles F.; Raggi, Reena; Sutton, Jeffrey S.; Wood, Diane P. (2012). "A Dialogue with Federal Judges on the Role of History in Interpretation" (PDF). The George Washington International Law Review. 80: 1889–1922.
- Kavanaugh, Brett (2014). "The Courts and the Administrative State (2013 Sumner Canary Memorial Lecture)". Case Western Reserve Law Review. 64 (3): 711–731. A video of the lecture is available on YouTube.
- Kavanaugh, Brett (2017). "Keynote Address: Two Challenges for the Judge as Umpire: Statutory Ambiguity and Constitutional Exceptions". Notre Dame Law Review. 92: 1907–1920.
- Kavanaugh, Brett (2016). "The Judge as Umpire: Ten Principles". Catholic University Law Review. 65: 683–692. A video of the lecture is available on YouTube.
- Kavanaugh, Brett (2017). From the Bench: The Constitutional Statesmanship of Chief Justice William Rehnquist (2017 Walter Berns Constitution Day Lecture) (PDF). American Enterprise Institute. Archived from the original (PDF) on November 12, 2020. A video of the lecture is available on YouTube.

Books

- Kavanaugh, Brett M. (2016). Garner, Bryan A. (ed.). The Law of Judicial Precedent. St. Paul: Thomson West. ISBN 978-0-314-63420-7. Brett Kavanaugh is one of thirteen co-authors (including Neil Gorsuch) of the treatise. The chapters are not written separately by the authors.

== See also ==
- Donald Trump Supreme Court candidates
- Donald Trump judicial appointment controversies
- George W. Bush Supreme Court candidates
- List of law clerks for the first seat of the Supreme Court of the United States
- List of justices of the Supreme Court of the United States

Political offices
Preceded by Harriet Miers	White House Staff Secretary; 2003–2006	Succeeded by Raul Yanes
Legal offices
Preceded by Laurence Silberman	Judge of the United States Court of Appeals for the District of Columbia Circuit; 2006–2018	Succeeded by Neomi Rao
Preceded by Anthony Kennedy	Associate Justice of the Supreme Court of the United States; 2018–present	Incumbent
U.S. order of precedence (ceremonial)
Preceded by Neil Gorsuch	Order of precedence of the United States as Associate Justice of the Supreme Court	Succeeded by Amy Coney Barrett
