= West Coast Health Alliance =

Interstate compact in the United States

West Coast Health Alliance member states.

The West Coast Health Alliance (WCHA) is a coalition formed by an interstate compact among the states of California, Oregon, Hawaii, and Washington to coordinate public health guidelines separate from the Centers for Disease Control and Prevention (CDC), including safeguarding access to vaccines.

The plan was initially announced by the governors of California, Oregon, and Washington on their respective state websites on September 3, 2025. The next day, Hawaii announced that it would join. On September 23, Nevadan organizations representing thousands of healthcare clinicians and public health professionals strongly urged that Nevada join.

The WCHA criticized the dismantling of the CDC and announced plans to coordinate providing evidence-based immunization recommendations and public access information about the safety and efficacy of vaccines.

== Background ==
The coalition was formed after a series of controversial decisions by the Department of Health and Human Services (HHS) under the leadership of Robert F. Kennedy Jr. A week before the announcement, CDC director Susan Monarez was fired over disagreements on vaccine policy, with her attorneys saying she "refused to rubber-stamp unscientific, reckless directives". Four more top CDC leaders resigned claiming political interference in their duties. In June, Kennedy fired all 17 members of an advisory panel for vaccine recommendations, replacing some with people who had previously spread misinformation about COVID-19 vaccines.

Earlier in 2025, the Food and Drug Administration had limited access to COVID-19 vaccines, which had previously been available to everyone over 6 months of age. Under the new guidelines, only adults older than 65 and individuals with underlying health issues can receive the vaccines without first consulting a healthcare provider. The CDC also removed its recommendation that pregnant women receive the vaccine and required parents to consult a physician before their children could be vaccinated.

The initial member states previously participated in the Western States Pact, which helped coordinate the rollback of economic restrictions implemented by the state governments in response to the COVID-19 pandemic.

The WCHA released recommendations for COVID-19, influenza, and RSV vaccines for the 2025-2026 academic year.

== See also ==
- Collaboratives for respiratory virus vaccine guidelines:
  - Northeast Public Health Collaborative
- Interstate pacts for COVID-19 pandemic recovery:
  - Eastern States Multi-state Council
  - Midwest Governors Regional Pact
  - Western States Pact
- Second presidency of Donald Trump
- Vaccination policy of the United States
- Governors Public Health Alliance
