= WCHA (disambiguation) =

WCHA could refer to:

== Ice hockey ==
- Western Collegiate Hockey Association, an NCAA Division I ice hockey-only college athletic conference, commonly known as the WCHA.
- WCHA Final Five, playoff championship of the Western Collegiate Hockey Association.

== Radio ==
- WCHA (AM), a radio station broadcasting at 800 kHz on the AM band, licensed to Chambersburg, Pennsylvania.

== Computer programming ==
- wchar.h, computer programming term for a header file.
- Wchar t, also known as wide character, a type of computer character datatype.

== Other ==
- West Coast Health Alliance, public health coalition coordinating guidelines separate from the CDC
