= Governors Public Health Alliance =

Coalition created by the governors of several US states

The Governors Public Health Alliance is a coalition created by the governors of several US states to coordinate their public health efforts, building on existing regional efforts such as the West Coast Health Alliance.

Participating states and territory:

- California
- Colorado
- Connecticut
- Delaware
- Hawaii
- Illinois
- Maryland
- Massachusetts
- New Jersey
- New York (state)
- North Carolina
- Oregon
- Rhode Island
- Washington (state)
- Guam

The Governors Public Health Alliance will be supported by the nonprofit Governors Action Alliance, which is overseen by former governors across parties.

== See also ==
- Northeast Public Health Collaborative
- West Coast Health Alliance
