= Coalition for Mercury-Free Drugs v. Sebelius =

- Court: United States Court of Appeals for the District of Columbia Circuit
- Decided: 2012
- Citation: 671 F.3d 1275

Case opinions
- Majority: Brett Kavanaugh, joined by Judith W. Rogers and Stephen F. Williams

Coalition for Mercury-Free Drugs v. Sebelius, 671 F.3d 1275 (D.C. Cir. 2012), was a 2012 case decided by the United States Court of Appeals for the District of Columbia Circuit, holding that opponents of thimerosal-preserved vaccines lacked standing to challenge determinations by the Food and Drug Administration that the vaccines and their components were safe and effective. The named defendant in the case, Kathleen Sebelius, was the Secretary of the United States Department of Health and Human Services, the department with authority over the FDA.

The opinion was written by Brett Kavanaugh, then a judge of the D.C. Circuit. A review on SCOTUSblog provided the case as an example of the fact that "[e]ven when Kavanaugh rejects a claim, he sometimes uses his discussion of standing to show that he has heard the plaintiff's argument and taken it seriously". Bloomberg noted that "Kavanaugh's opinion for the court repeatedly went out of its way to show it respected the Coalition for Mercury-Free Drugs's (CoMeD) 'genuine concern' regarding thimerosal", but nevertheless "said the coalition was required to seek a ban through the executive or legislative branches". Kavanaugh's opinion, joined by Judith W. Rogers and Stephen F. Williams, therefore rejected the challenge on standing grounds. The court further found it irrelevant that thimerosal was included in some versions of mandated vaccines, because it was possible for those seeking to avoid the ingredient to receive thimerosal-free vaccines.

Legally and stylistically, the case greatly resembled Kavanaugh's 2024 opinion as Justice on the Supreme Court in FDA v. Alliance for Hippocratic Medicine, finding a similar lack of standing by a group of physicians seeking to overturn FDA approval of the abortion-drug Mifepristone. Kavanaugh also cited Coalition for Mercury-Free Drugs in his Alliance for Hippocratic Medicine decision.
