= The George Washington International Law Review =

- Discipline: International law
- Language: English
- Edited by: Harrison P. Baum

Publication details
- History: 1966-present
- Publisher: The George Washington International Law Review (United States)
- Frequency: Quarterly

Standard abbreviations
- Bluebook: Geo. Wash. Int'l L. Rev.
- ISO 4: George Wash. Int. Law Rev.

Indexing
- ISSN: 1534-9977
- ISSN: 0748-4305

Links
- Journal homepage

The George Washington International Law Review is a triannual student-run and -edited publication of the George Washington University Law School. It presents articles and essays on public and private international financial development, comparative law, and public international law and also publishes the Guide to International Legal Research annually.

Established in 1966 as the Journal of Law and Economic Development, later titles included Journal of International Law and Economics and George Washington Journal of International Law and Economics. Its editorial board is chosen each spring by the outgoing editorial board.
