= Nikolao v. Lyon =

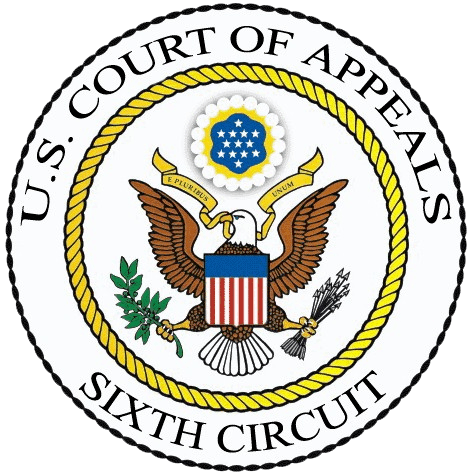
- Court: United States Court of Appeals for the Sixth Circuit
- Full case name: Tara Nikolao v. Nick Lyon, individually and in his official capacity as Director of the Michigan Department of Health and Human Services; Wayne County Department of Health, Veterans, and Community Wellness, Dr. Mouhanad Hammami, individually and in his official capacity as Director of the Wayne County Department of Health, Veterans, and Community Wellness, and Carol Austerberry, individually and in her official capacity as Division Director and Deputy Health Officer of the Wayne County Department of Health, Veterans, and Community Wellness
- Argued: October 12, 2017
- Decided: November 7, 2017
- Citation: 875 F.3d 310

Holding
- Dismissal affirmed

Court membership
- Judges sitting: Richard Fred Suhrheinrich, Richard Allen Griffin, Raymond Kethledge

Case opinions
- Majority: Suhrheinrich, joined by Griffin
- Concurrence: Kethledge

Laws applied
- 42 U.S.C. § 1983

Nikolao v. Lyon, 875 F.3d 310 (6th Cir. 2017), is a decision of the United States Court of Appeals for the Sixth Circuit addressing the scope of the Free Exercise Clause of the First Amendment in the context of religious exemptions to vaccination mandates. The plaintiff, a Catholic, objected to Michigan's procedures for claiming a religious exemption to school vaccination mandates, which required the parent to meet with public officials who unsuccessfully sought to persuade the parent that the official position of the Catholic Church favored vaccination. The district court dismissed the constitutional claims, and the Sixth Circuit affirmed the dismissal, finding that there was no injury supporting legal standing to sue, since the exemption was ultimately granted.

== Background ==
Michigan law requires children to be vaccinated before enrolling in public school, but permits exemptions for medical, religious, or other objections. In December 2014, the Michigan Department of Health and Human Services (MDHHS) implemented an administrative rule known as the Certification Rule. Under this rule, parents seeking an exemption must attend an education session at their county health department to discuss their objections and review state-prepared materials. In 2015, Tara Nikolao, a Michigan parent, sought a religious exemption to her child's vaccination requirements for public school enrollment on the assertion that this was against her beliefs as a Catholic. Nikolao presented a letter from her priest explaining her religious objection, and health department employees provided her with a document called a Religious Waiver Note, which contained statements in response to common religious objections to vaccination, including an endorsement of vaccination from the Catholic Church, and a quotation incorrectly attributed to Pope Benedict XVI.

Nikolao refused to sign the waiver, and was granted a philosophical exemption in lieu of receiving a religious exemption. Nikolao filed suit against state officials, including Nick Lyon, Director of the Michigan Department of Health and Human Services, under 42 U.S.C. § 1983, alleging that the exemption process violated her rights under the Free Exercise Clause and the Establishment Clause, as well as her rights under the Fourteenth Amendment.

The United States District Court for the Western District of Michigan dismissed the case for failure to state a claim. The court found that the Certification Rule served a secular purpose of promoting public health, and held that the process did not infringe Nikolao's constitutional rights because it neither compelled her to vaccinate her child nor penalized her religious beliefs.

== Opinion of the Sixth Circuit ==
In an opinion by Judge Suhrheinrich, the Sixth Circuit affirmed the dismissal, finding that Nikolao lacked standing to sue under Article III, having failed to carry her burden of showing that the state compelled her "to do or refrain from doing an act forbidden or required by one's religion, or to affirm or disavow a belief forbidden or required by one's religion".

Because Nikolao was able to obtain the requested exemption, and was not forced to change her religious beliefs, alter her practices, or affirm or deny any doctrine, the court concluded she lacked the injury-in-fact required to establish standing. Nikolao argued that forced exposure to contrary information was offensive, but the court held that merely being exposed to information did not rise to the level of a cognizable injury. The court also found that taking time off work to complete the exemption process did not constitute a legally significant burden. With respect to Nikolao's Establishment Clause claim, the court further found that both the Certification Rule and the Religious Waiver Note served the secular purpose of promoting public health through education, did not advance or inhibit religion, and did not create excessive entanglement with religion under the Lemon test.

Judge Kethledge concurred in the judgment, agreeing that Nikolao could not obtain relief from the named defendants because she failed to allege that they personally directed or approved the conduct of the nurses. He also observed that none of the served defendants continued to publish the Religious Waiver Note, and therefore could not be enjoined.

== Commentary ==
Some legal scholars have described the decision as reflecting a narrower conception of free exercise standing that requires actual coercion rather than indirect burdens. Mark Navin has argued that the case illustrates the tension between public health policies and individual privacy and religious liberty claims. Navin notes that the waiver process raised questions about whether the state may require parents to disclose personal religious views and engage in discussion about their beliefs as a precondition for exercising an exemption. Brendan Beery criticized the Sixth Circuit's "coercion" requirement as unduly narrow, noting that many free exercise claimants may suffer dignitary or privacy harms without being compelled to change beliefs.

Navin situates Nikolao within broader debates about religious exemptions, describing it as an example of how states may design exemption processes that test the sincerity or logic of religious objections without necessarily violating constitutional protections.

Nikolao v. Lyon has been cited as an example of the Sixth Circuit’s approach to free exercise claims, emphasizing that the Free Exercise Clause does not prohibit neutral, generally applicable requirements such as informational sessions, so long as they do not compel individuals to adopt or renounce religious beliefs.

== See also ==
- Jacobson v. Massachusetts (1905)
- Zucht v. King (1922)
- Prince v. Massachusetts (1944)
