= Solomon L. Wisenberg =

American lawyer

Sol Wisenberg
- Born: Solomon Louis Wisenberg; June 8, 1954 (age 72)
- Education: Washington University (BA); University of Texas, Austin (JD)
- Occupation: Shareholder at FBFK Law
- Known for: Deputy independent counsel of the Whitewater investigation and Clinton-Lewinsky investigation

Solomon Louis Wisenberg (born June 8, 1954) is an American lawyer, legal analyst, and former chief of the Financial Institution Fraud Unit in the U.S. Attorney's Office for the Western District of Texas. From 1997 to 1999, he served as Associate and Deputy Independent Counsel under Kenneth W. Starr during the Whitewater investigation & Clinton-Lewinsky investigations. Wisenberg was a frequent commentator on legal issues related to the investigation of Donald Trump's presidential campaign by Special Counsel Robert Mueller that resulted in a finding of insufficient evidence of a criminal conspiracy. In 2025, Wisenberg joined FBFK Law, a law firm out of Plano, Texas.

== Early career ==
Wisenberg studied at the University of Texas Law School and clerked with the United States Court of Appeals for the Second Circuit. He then served as an assistant U.S. attorney in North Carolina and Texas from 1987 to 1997. In 1993, as the chief of the Financial Institution Fraud Unit in the U.S. Attorney's Office for the Western District of Texas, Wisenberg first chaired the Victoria Savings Association investigation and trial that resulted in the conviction of eleven individuals for defrauding the Victoria Savings Association of $200 million. Victoria Savings Association had been previously identified by Congress as one of the Top 100 savings and loan failures in the United States. A history of prosecuting complex financial crimes made Wisenberg a top candidate to assist Independent Counsel Starr in the investigation of the Clinton's financial involvement with the Madison Guaranty Savings and Loan Association, and he was recruited by Starr's office.

== Clinton investigation ==
Wisenberg joined the Starr team in 1997 as Associate Independent Counsel to work on aspects of the Madison Guaranty Savings investigation and in 1998 was promoted to Deputy Independent Counsel. Wisenberg was one of four deputy independent counsels who took part in the federal grand jury questioning of President Bill Clinton. In January 1998, at the request of Starr and U.S. attorney general Janet Reno, the scope of Starr's investigation was broadened to include possible obstruction of justice in Clinton v. Jones, a sexual harassment suit brought against Clinton by Paula Jones. Wisenberg led the grand jury phase of the Lewinsky investigation and questioned Clinton during his videotaped grand jury testimony that took place on August 17, 1998.

Wisenberg elicited Clinton's most infamous answer during federal grand jury questioning in the Lewinsky Investigation. He asked Clinton: "[T]he statement that there was 'no sex of any kind in any manner, shape or form, [between Lewinsky and] President Clinton,' was an utterly false statement. Is that correct?" Clinton responded: "It depends on what the meaning of the word 'is' is." By mid-1998, Wisenberg and the rest of the Starr team were facing accusations of partisanship for pursuing the Lewinsky sex scandal as part of an investigation that had primarily begun as an inquiry into financial improprieties and potential corruption.

The Starr Report was released on September 11, 1998, and the House of Representatives subsequently voted to impeach. Clinton was acquitted in the Senate and Wisenberg entered private practice in 1999.

== Mueller investigation ==
Since the launch of the investigation into Russian interference in the 2016 presidential election by Special Counsel Robert Mueller in May 2017, Wisenberg has made numerous media appearances on NBC, Fox News, MSNBC, CBS, CNN, NPR, PBS, and in The New York Times, The Wall Street Journal and other national publications. In the absence of released or leaked information from the Mueller team, members of the media have drawn on Wisenberg's experience investigating and questioning Bill Clinton to provide insight into the procedures involved and the potential strategies the Mueller team may have been following. On September 19, 2017, Wisenberg's analysis of Mueller's pre-dawn raid on Paul Manafort's home appeared in The New York Times. He stressed that Mueller was sending a message, saying: "They are setting a tone. It's important early on to strike terror in the hearts of people in Washington, or else you will be rolled." In May 2018, Wisenberg criticized Trump lawyer and former New York City mayor Rudy Giuliani for making statements highlighting the political value of hush money payments made to Stormy Daniels with Trump's personal funds. Wisenberg likened Giuliani's statements to a murder-suicide.

Following the appearance of former Trump lawyer Michael Cohen before the House Oversight Committee on February 27, 2019, Wisenberg concluded that Cohen's testimony provided no new information about potential collusion between the Trump campaign and Russian intelligence agencies or crimes around payments to Stormy Daniels. He did conclude that Cohen's testimony may have increased Trump's legal exposure by indicating that he has provided purposely inaccurate financial information to lending institutions and the Internal Revenue Service.

== Author ==
Wisenberg is the primary author of White Collar Crime: Securities Fraud (Thomson Reuters Third Edition 2016).
