= GovAct =

U.S. nonpartisan gubernatorial policy advocates

The Governors Action Alliance (GovAct) is a nonpartisan nonprofit organization that aims to develop and disseminate progressive policies among governors of U.S. states and territories. It was founded in 2024 by Julia Spiegel, a lawyer who served as legal counsel to California Governor Gavin Newsom during the Supreme Court's Dobbs v. Jackson Women's Health Organization decision. The organization operates alliances to distribute and assist in policy development among governors and state executives.

== Initiatives ==
=== Reproductive Freedom Alliance ===
The Reproductive Freedom Alliance was formed on February 21, 2023.

=== Governors Safeguarding Democracy ===
Following the election of Donald Trump to a second term as president, the Governors Safeguarding Democracy was formed on November 13, 2024. Colorado Governor Jared Polis and Illinois Governor JB Pritzker are the founding co-chairs.

=== Governors Public Health Alliance ===
The Governors' Public Health Alliance was formed on October 15, 2025.
