= Western States Pact =

Interstate compact between five western states in the United States

The Western States Pact is an interstate compact between five western states in the United States to coordinate the rollback of economic restrictions implemented by the state governments in response to the COVID-19 pandemic.

== Agreement ==
In announcing the Western States Pact on April 13, 2020, California, Oregon, and Washington governors Gavin Newsom, Kate Brown, and Jay Inslee jointly announced that "COVID-19 doesn't follow state or national boundaries. It will take every level of government, working together, and a full picture of what's happening on the ground."

The agreement was made with four goals:

- Protecting populations that are vulnerable (such as those in retirement homes)
- Maintaining an acceptable supply of personal protective equipment in hospitals
- Mitigating poverty and unavailability of healthcare caused by the pandemic
- Connecting the rollback of economic restrictions with a method to track the transmission of the virus

On April 27, Colorado governor Jared Polis and Nevada governor Steve Sisolak announced their states would join the Western States Pact, with the latter noting the importance of information sharing.

== Timeline ==
On April 30, 2020, research and education networks from the states involved, such as the University Corporation for Atmospheric Research's Front Range GigaPop, Nevada System of Higher Education's NevadaNet, CENIC, Link Oregon, and the Pacific Northwest Gigapop, announced they would be joining the shared approach under the Western States Pact and would be offering ultra-broadband research and education telecommunications networks and services to support the Western States Pact.

On May 11, the Western States Pact released a letter, signed by the governors and state legislative leaders of all five states, to Congress requesting $1 trillion in aid to address the financial impacts of the coronavirus. The letter states that the aid would "preserve core government services like public health, public safety, public education, and help people get back to work. It would help our states and cities come out of this crisis stronger and more resilient."

On September 16, the governors of California, Oregon, and Washington announced a joint pilot project to test the COVID-19 Exposure Notification System developed by Apple and Google for mobile phones. If the pilot project is successful, these states would then plan to roll out the technology to all residents. Since Colorado and Nevada already have statewide Exposure Notification apps, all states in the Western States Pact would then be participants in the system.

On October 27, the governors of Nevada, Oregon, and Washington announced that their states would join California's COVID-19 Scientific Safety Review Workgroup. This workgroup would provide the Western States Pact with a coordinated review of any potential COVID-19 vaccine, independent of the federal Food and Drug Administration (FDA).

On November 13, California, Oregon, and Washington issued a joint travel advisory, encouraging residents to avoid non-essential travel and urging people arriving from other states to self-quarantine for 14 days.

On December 14, the Western States Scientific Safety Review Workgroup analyzed safety and efficacy data for the Pfizer-BioNTech COVID-19 vaccine. The workgroup unanimously recommended authorization of the vaccine for emergency use, allowing California, Nevada, Oregon, and Washington to proceed with vaccination campaigns without delay. On December 20, the workgroup also recommended authorization of the Moderna COVID-19 vaccine.

On March 3, 2021, the Western States Scientific Safety Review Workgroup recommended authorization of the Janssen COVID-19 vaccine.

== Parties ==
Eastern States Multi-state Council Midwest Governors Regional Pact Western States Pact

State	Governor	Accession
California	Gavin Newsom	April 13, 2020
Colorado	Jared Polis	April 27, 2020
Nevada	Steve Sisolak	April 27, 2020
Oregon	Kate Brown	April 13, 2020
Washington	Jay Inslee	April 13, 2020

== Reactions ==
Shortly after the Western States Pact and northeastern states announced their own joint plans on April 13, 2020, U.S. President Donald Trump asserted his "total authority" over the states' decisions about when to lift the shutdowns implemented in response to the pandemic. After criticism from both Democratic and Republican members of Congress, Trump clarified on April 14 that he would be "authorizing each individual governor of each individual state to implement a reopening" of their economy. However, Cornell Law School professor Kathleen Bergin said, "Trump has no authority [...] These are matters for states to decide under [...] the Tenth Amendment to the Constitution."

After Hawaiian business leaders and state House Speaker Scott Saiki encouraged joining the Western States Pact, Governor David Ige said he considered joining but decided not to because Hawaii did not share a land boundary with the pact's member states.

== See also ==
- Other interstate compacts on the rollback of COVID-19 economic restrictions:
  - Eastern States Multi-state Council
  - Midwest Governors Regional Pact
- West Coast Health Alliance – later compact on public health guidelines
- Economic impact of the COVID-19 pandemic
- U.S. state and local government responses to the COVID-19 pandemic
