= Midwest Governors Regional Pact =

US interstate compact

The Midwest Governors Regional Pact is an interstate compact between seven midwestern states in the United States to coordinate the rollback of economic restrictions implemented by the state governments in response to the COVID-19 pandemic.

On November 17, 2020, all governors in the pact participated in a video urging their citizens to continue social distancing, "mask up", and take other necessary steps to avoid transmitting the virus over the upcoming holiday season.

== Agreement ==
In a joint statement on April 16, 2020, governors from the states of Illinois, Indiana, Kentucky, Michigan, Minnesota, Ohio, and Wisconsin announced the formation of a Midwest regional partnership on COVID-19 similar to the Western States Pact formed by five western states and the Eastern States Multi-state Council formed by seven northeastern states.

The group has agreed to consider four factors as to when to reopen the economy, namely:

- "Sustained control of the rate of new infections and hospitalizations"
- "Enhanced ability to test and trace"
- "Sufficient health care capacity to handle resurgence"
- "Best practices for social distancing in the workplace"

As to why Iowa was not included in the said pact, Governor Kim Reynolds has refused to comment but assured that she "will continue to participate in conversations with nearby governors as we prepare to open the state back up in the coming weeks" according to her spokesperson, Pat Garrett. However, Pritzker said that "Iowa chose not to be part of this." Governors from Missouri, North Dakota and South Dakota also reportedly declined joining the partnership.

== Parties ==
Eastern States Multi-state Council Midwest Governors Regional Pact Western States Pact

State	Governor	Accession
Illinois	J. B. Pritzker	April 16, 2020
Indiana	Eric Holcomb	April 16, 2020
Kentucky	Andy Beshear	April 16, 2020
Michigan	Gretchen Whitmer	April 16, 2020
Minnesota	Tim Walz	April 16, 2020
Ohio	Mike DeWine	April 16, 2020
Wisconsin	Tony Evers	April 16, 2020

== See also ==
- Other interstate compacts on the rollback of COVID-19 economic restrictions:
  - Eastern States Multi-state Council
  - Western States Pact
- Economic impact of the COVID-19 pandemic
- U.S. state and local government responses to the COVID-19 pandemic
