= List of environmental ministries =

An environmental ministry is a national or subnational government agency politically responsible for the environment and/or natural resources. Various other names are commonly used to identify such agencies, such as Ministry of the Environment, Department of the Environment, Department of Environmental Protection, Department of Natural Resources or Ministry for the Ecological Transition. Such agencies typically address environmental concerns such as the maintenance of environmental quality, nature preserves, the sustained use of natural resources, and prevention of pollution or contamination of the natural environment. Sometimes these tasks are undertaken by other agencies, such as ministries of agriculture or of transport.

Following is a list of environmental ministries by country:

== Algeria ==
- Ministry of Water Resources and Environment

== Argentina ==
- Ministry of the Environment and Sustainable Development
  - National Parks Administration

== Australia ==
=== Federal ===
- Department of Climate Change, Energy, the Environment and Water

=== States ===
- Department for Environment and Water (South Australia)
- Department of Climate Change, Energy, the Environment and Water (New South Wales)
- Department of Energy, Environment and Climate Action (Victoria)
- Department of Environment, Science and Innovation (Queensland)
- Department of Natural Resources and Environment (Tasmania)
- Department of Water and Environmental Regulation (Western Australia)

== Azerbaijan ==
- Ministry of Ecology and Natural Resources

== Bangladesh ==
- Ministry of Environment, Forest and Climate Change (Bangladesh)
  - Department of Environment
  - Forest Department
  - Bangladesh Climate Change Trust
  - Bangladesh National Herbarium
  - Bangladesh Forest Research Institute (BFRI)
  - Bangladesh Forest Industries Development Corporation
  - Bangladesh Rubber Board

== Brazil ==
- Ministry of the Environment

== Bulgaria ==
- Ministry of Environment and Water

== Cambodia ==
- Ministry of Environment

== Canada ==
National

- Environment and Climate Change Canada
- Fisheries and Oceans Canada
- Natural Resources Canada

Provincial

- Department of Environment and Local Government (New Brunswick)
- Manitoba Environment, Climate and Parks
- Ministry of the Environment, Conservation and Parks
- Ministry of Natural Resources and Forestry
- Ministry of Energy and Natural Resources (Quebec)
- Ministry of Sustainable Development, Environment, and Fight Against Climate Change
- Nova Scotia Department of Environment and Climate Change

== China ==
=== National ===
- Ministry of Ecology and Environment
  formerly Ministry of Environmental Protection (2008–2018)
  - National Nuclear Safety Administration
- Ministry of Natural Resources
  - State Forestry and Grassland Administration (aka National Park Administration)

=== Hong Kong ===
- Environment and Ecology Bureau
  - Environmental Protection Department
  - Agriculture, Fisheries and Conservation Department

=== Macau ===
- Secretariat for Transport and Public Works
  - Environmental Protection Bureau (Macau)

== Croatia ==
- Ministry of Construction and Spatial Planning
- Ministry of Environmental and Nature Protection

== Cuba ==
- Ministry of Science, Technology and Environment

== Democratic Republic of the Congo ==
- Ministry of Environment, Nature Conservation and Tourism

== Denmark ==
- Ministry of Climate and Energy
- Ministry of Environment
  - Danish Forest and Nature Agency
  - Danish Geodata Agency

== Egypt ==
- Ministry of Environment

== El Salvador ==
- Ministry of the Environment and Natural Resources

== Finland ==
- Finnish Safety and Chemicals Agency
- Radiation and Nuclear Safety Authority
- Finnish Environment Institute

== France ==
- Ministry of Agriculture, Food, Fisheries, Rural Affairs and Spatial Planning
- Ministry of Ecology, Sustainable Development and Energy

== Georgia ==
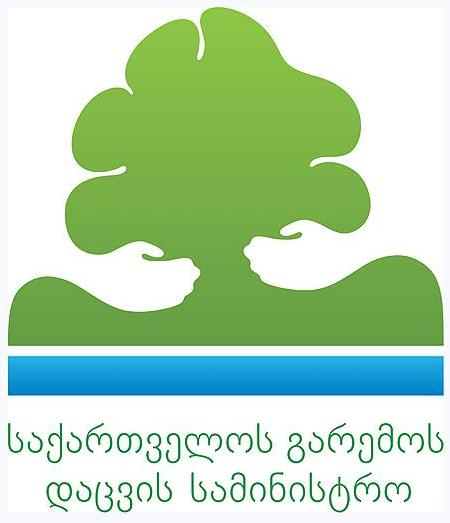
Logo of the Georgian Ministry of Environmental Protection

- Ministry of Environmental Protection and Agriculture

== Germany ==
- Federal Ministry for Environment, Nature Conservation and Nuclear Safety (BMU) with:
  - Umweltbundesamt (UBA) — the German Environment Agency, which provides scientific support
  - Federal Agency for Nature Conservation
  - Bundesamt für kerntechnische Entsorgungssicherheit - the German agency for nuclear safety
  - Bundesamt für Strahlenschutz
- Federal Ministry for Food and Agriculture (BMEL) with:
  - Agency for Renewable Resources
  - Federal Institute for Risk Assessment
  - others

== Greece ==
- Ministry of the Environment, Energy and Climate Change

== Guatemala ==
- Ministry of the Environment and Natural Resources

== Honduras ==
- Secretariat of Energy, Natural Resources, Environment and Mines

== Hungary ==
- Ministry of Environment (until 2011)
- Ministry of Agriculture, responsible for the environment since 2011

== Iceland ==
- Ministry for the Environment and Natural Resources

== India ==
- Ministry of Environment, Forest and Climate Change
  - Central Pollution Control Board
  - Indian Council of Forestry Research and Education
  - Indian Forest Service
- Department of Environment (Kerala)
- Department of Environment and Forests (Tamil Nadu)

== Indonesia ==
- Ministry of Environment

== Iran ==
- Department of Environment

== Ireland ==
- Department of Agriculture, Food and the Marine
- Department of the Climate, Energy and the Environment
- Environmental Protection Agency

== Israel ==
- Environmental Protection Ministry

== Italy ==
- Ministry of the Environment (Italy)

== Japan ==
- Ministry of the Environment

== Korea, Republic of (South Korea) ==
- Ministry of Environment

== Kuwait ==
- Environment Public Authority

== Kyrgyzstan ==
- Ministry of Natural Resources, Environment and Technical supervision
- Ministry of Agriculture
  - Department of Fisheries
  - Department of Mechanization, Innovative Technologies and Cooperation
  - Department of Pasture and Breeding Livestock
  - Plant Quarantine Department
  - Department of Organic Agriculture
  - Agricultural Crops Examination Department
  - Center for Registration and Certification of Veterinary Drugs, Feed and Feed Additives
  - Department of Chemicals, Protection and Plant Quarantine
  - "AgroSmart" Digitization and Marketing Center (State Enterprise)
  - Forest Service
  - Veterinary Service
  - Land and Water Control Service
  - Kyrgyz Agricultural Research Institute
  - Kyrgyz Research Institute of Animal Husbandry and Pasture
- Ministry of Energy

== Lithuania ==
- Ministry of Environment

== Luxembourg ==
- Department of Environment

== Malaysia ==
- Ministry of Natural Resources, Environment and Climate Change
- Department of Environment

== Maldives ==
- Ministry of Tourism and Environment
  - Environmental Protection Agency

== Mexico ==
- Secretariat of Environment and Natural Resources
  - National Forestry Commission
  - National Institute of Ecology & Climate Change
  - Agency of Security, Energy & Environment
  - National Water Commission
  - Federal Prosecutor Office for Environmental Protection
  - National Commission for the Knowledge and Use of Biodiversity
  - National Commission of Natural Protected Areas
- Secretariat of Agriculture & Rural Development
  - National Commission of Aquaculture and Fisheries
  - National Institute of Forestry, Agricultural and Livestock Research

== Moldova ==
- Ministry of Environment

== Myanmar ==
- Ministry of Environmental Conservation and Forestry

== Nepal ==
- Ministry of Agriculture, Forests and Environment

== Netherlands ==
- Ministry of Infrastructure and Water Management

== New Zealand ==
- Department of Conservation
- Ministry for the Environment
- Ministry for Primary Industries

== Nicaragua ==
- Ministry of the Environment and Natural Resources

== Nigeria ==
National

- Federal Ministry of Agriculture and Rural Development
- Federal Ministry of Environment

States

- Rivers State Ministry of Environment

== Norway ==
- Ministry of Agriculture and Food
- Ministry of the Environment
  - Climate and Pollution Agency
  - Directorate for Nature Management

== Pakistan ==
- Ministry of Environment

== Papua New Guinea ==
- Papua New Guinea Conservation & Environment Protection Authority

== Peru ==
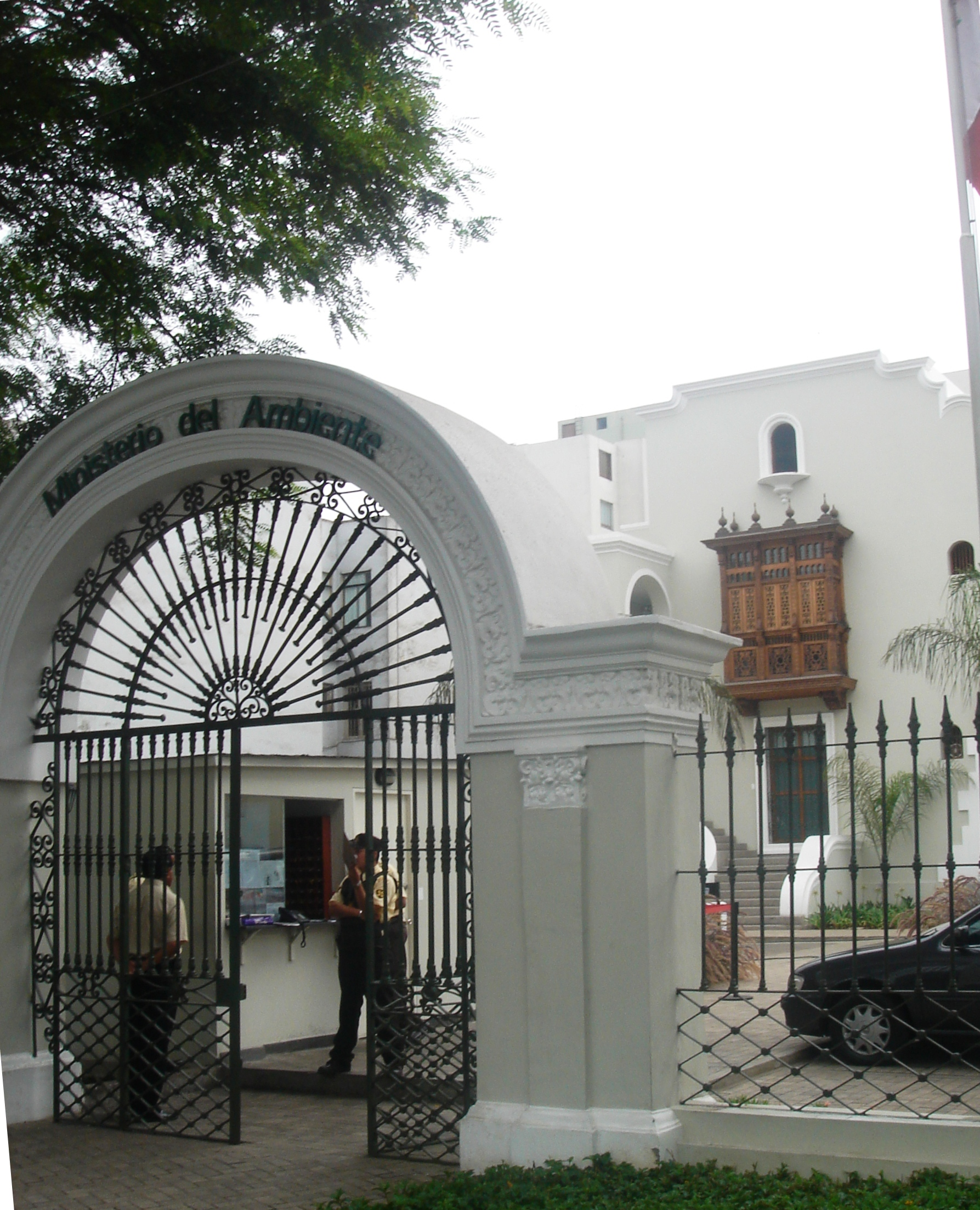
Headquarters of the Peruvian Ministry of the Environment

- Ministry of Environment

== Philippines ==
- Department of Environment and Natural Resources
  - Environmental Management Bureau
  - Mines and Geosciences Bureau
  - Land Management Bureau
  - Forest Management Bureau
  - Ecosystem Research Development Bureau
- Climate Change Commission

== Poland ==
- Ministry of Environment

== Portugal ==
- Ministry of Environment

== Romania ==
- Ministry of Environment and Forests

== Russia ==
- Ministry of Agriculture
  - Federal Service for Veterinary and Phytosanitary Supervision
  - Federal Agency for Fishery
- Ministry of Natural Resources and Environment
  - Federal Service for Hydrometeorology and Environmental Monitoring
  - Federal Service for Supervision of Natural Resources
  - Federal Agency of Water Resources
  - Federal Agency for Forestry
  - Federal Agency for Mineral Resources

== Saudi Arabia ==
Ministry of Environment Water and Agriculture (Saudi Arabia)

== Singapore ==
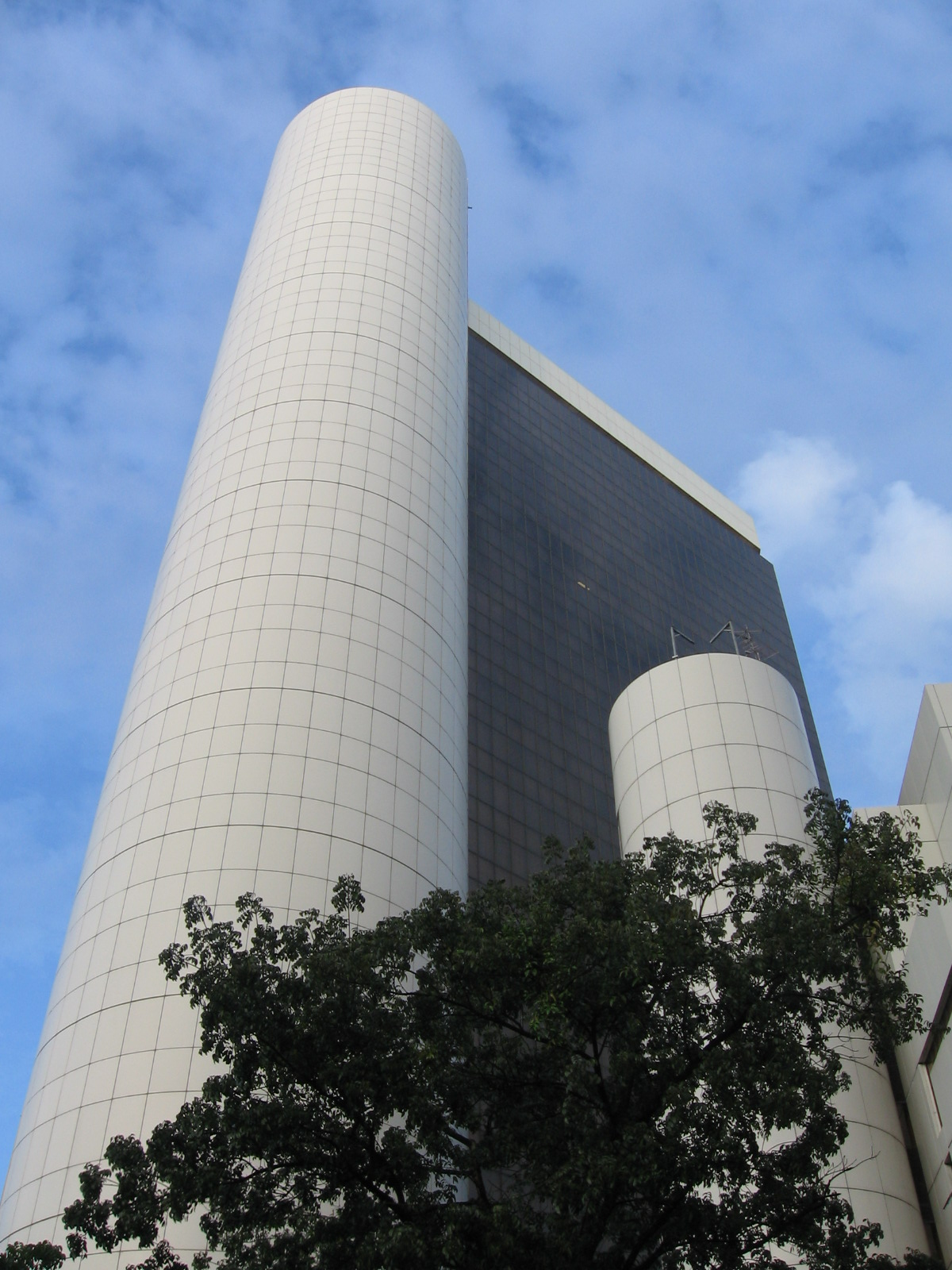
Headquarters of the Singapore Ministry of Sustainability and the Environment

- Ministry of Sustainability and the Environment
- National Environment Agency
- National Parks Board

== Somalia ==
=== Federal Government of Somalia ===
- Ministry of Environment and Climate Change

=== Government of Puntland ===
- Ministry of Environment, Range and Climate Change

=== Government of Somaliland ===
- Ministry of Environment and Rural Development

== South Africa ==
- Department of Agriculture, Land Reform & Rural Development
- Department of Environment, Forestry & Fisheries

== South Korea ==
- Ministry for Food, Agriculture, Forestry and Fisheries
- Ministry of Environment

== Spain ==
- Ministry for the Ecological Transition and the Demographic Challenge
- Ministry of Agriculture, Fisheries and Food

== Sri Lanka ==
- Department of Wildlife Conservation, responsible for maintaining national parks, nature reserves and wildlife in wilderness areas
- Department of Forest Conservation, for maintenance of forest reserves and wilderness areas
- Ministry of Environment, specifically for Mahaweli River area

== Sweden ==
- Ministry of the Environment (dissolved in 2022)
- Ministry of Climate and Enterprise
  - Environmental Protection Agency

== Switzerland ==
- Federal Department of Environment, Transport, Energy and Communications

== Republic of China (Taiwan) ==
- Ministry of Environment

== Tanzania ==
- Ministry of Natural Resources and Tourism

== Thailand ==
- Ministry of Natural Resources and Environment (Thailand)

== Turkey ==
- Ministry of Energy and Natural Resources
- Ministry of Environment, Urbanisation and Climate Change
- Ministry of Agriculture and Forestry

== Uganda ==
- Ministry of Water and Environment (Uganda)

== Ukraine ==
- Ministry of Ecology

== United Kingdom ==
=== England ===
- Department for Environment, Food and Rural Affairs (DEFRA)
- Environment Agency (protection and regulation)
- Forestry Commission
- Historic England (monuments and buildings)
- Natural England (conservation)

=== Northern Ireland ===
- Department of Agriculture, Environment and Rural Affairs
  - Northern Ireland Environment Agency (environmental protection and conservation)
- Department for Communities (monuments and buildings)

=== Scotland ===
- Environment and Forestry Directorate
- Historic Environment Scotland (monuments and buildings)
- NatureScot (conservation)
- Scottish Environment Protection Agency (protection and regulation)

=== Wales ===
- Cadw (monuments and buildings)
- Natural Resources Wales (environmental protection and conservation)

== United States ==
National

- Council on Environmental Quality
- United States Department of Agriculture
  - United States Forest Service
- United States Department of Defense
- United States Department of Energy
- United States Department of the Interior
  - Bureau of Land Management
  - National Park Service
  - United States Fish and Wildlife Service
  - United States Geological Survey
- United States Environmental Protection Agency

=== Alabama ===
- Alabama Department of Conservation and Natural Resources
- Alabama Department of Environmental Management

=== Alaska ===
- Alaska Department of Natural Resources
- Alaska Department of Environmental Conservation

=== Arizona ===
- Arizona Department of Environmental Quality
- Arizona Game and Fish Department

=== Arkansas ===
- Arkansas Department of Environmental Quality

=== California ===
- California Environmental Protection Agency
  - California Department of Pesticide Regulation
  - California Department of Toxic Substances Control
  - California Air Resources Board
  - California Department of Resources Recycling and Recovery
- California Natural Resources Agency
  - California Department of Conservation
  - California Department of Fish and Game
  - California Department of Forestry and Fire Protection
  - California Department of Parks and Recreation
  - California Department of Water Resources

=== Colorado ===
- Colorado Department of Natural Resources

=== Connecticut ===
- Connecticut Department of Energy and Environmental Protection

=== Delaware ===
- Delaware Department of Natural Resources and Environmental Control

=== District of Columbia ===
- Department of Energy and Environment

=== Florida ===
- Florida Department of Environmental Protection
- Florida Fish and Wildlife Conservation Commission
- Northwest Florida Water Management District
- Suwannee River Water Management District
- St. Johns River Water Management District
- Southwest Florida Water Management District
- South Florida Water Management District

=== Georgia ===
- Georgia Department of Natural Resources

=== Hawaii ===
- Hawai'i Department of Land and Natural Resources

=== Idaho ===
- Idaho Department of Environmental Quality
- Idaho Department of Fish and Game
- Idaho Department of Parks and Recreation
- Idaho Department of Lands

=== Illinois ===
- Illinois Department of Natural Resources
- Illinois Environmental Protection Agency

=== Indiana ===
- Indiana Department of Environmental Management
- Indiana Department of Natural Resources

=== Iowa ===
- Iowa Department of Natural Resources

=== Kansas ===
- Kansas Department of Agriculture, Division of Water Resources
- Kansas Department of Health and Environment, Division of Environment
- Kansas Department of Wildlife and Parks

=== Kentucky ===
- Kentucky Department for Natural Resources
- Kentucky Department of Environmental Protection

=== Louisiana ===
- Louisiana Department of Environmental Quality
- Louisiana Department of Natural Resources

=== Maine ===
- Maine Department of Environmental Protection
- Maine Department of Agriculture, Conservation and Forestry
- Maine Department of Inland Fisheries and Wildlife

=== Maryland ===
- Maryland Department of Natural Resources
- Maryland Department of the Environment

=== Massachusetts ===
- Massachusetts Executive Office of Energy and Environmental Affairs (EOEEA)
  - Coastal Zone Management
  - Water Resources Commission
  - Massachusetts Environmental Police
  - Office of Grants and Technical Assistance
    - Division of Conservation Services
    - Massachusetts Environmental Trust
    - Office of Technical Assistance and Technology
  - Natural Resource Damages Assessment and Restoration
- Massachusetts Department of Agricultural Resources
  - Division of Agricultural Conservation and Tech Assistance
  - Division of Agricultural Markets
  - Division of Animal Health
  - Division of Crop and Pest Services
- Massachusetts Department of Conservation and Recreation
  - Division of State Parks (MassParks)
  - Division of Water Supply Protection
- Massachusetts Department of Energy Resources
- Massachusetts Department of Environmental Protection
- Massachusetts Department of Fish and Game
  - Division of Fisheries and Wildlife (MassWildlife)
  - Division of Marine Fisheries
  - Division of Ecological Restoration
  - Office of Fishing and Boating Access

=== Michigan ===
- Michigan Department of Environmental Quality
- Michigan Department of Natural Resources

=== Minnesota ===
- Minnesota Department of Health
- Minnesota Department of Natural Resources
- Minnesota Environmental Quality Board
- Minnesota Pollution Control Agency
- University of Minnesota Extension Service

=== Mississippi ===
- Mississippi Department of Environmental Quality

=== Missouri ===
- Missouri Department of Conservation
- Missouri Department of Natural Resources

=== Montana ===
- Montana Department of Natural Resources and Conservation

=== Nebraska ===
- Nebraska Department of Natural Resources

=== Nevada ===
- Nevada Department of Conservation and Natural Resources

=== New Hampshire ===
- New Hampshire Department of Environmental Services

=== New Jersey ===
- New Jersey Department of Environmental Protection
  - New Jersey Division of Parks and Forestry

=== New Mexico ===
- New Mexico Department of Energy, Minerals, and Natural Resources
- New Mexico Environment Department

=== New York ===
- Adirondack Park Agency
- Hudson River Valley Greenway
- New York City Department of Environmental Protection
- New York State Department of Agriculture and Markets
- New York State Department of Environmental Conservation
- New York State Energy Research and Development Authority
- New York State Environmental Facilities Corporation
- New York State Office of Parks, Recreation and Historic Preservation

=== North Carolina ===
- North Carolina Department of Environment and Natural Resources

=== North Dakota ===
- North Dakota Department of Environmental Quality

=== Ohio ===
- Ohio Department of Natural Resources
- Ohio Environmental Protection Agency

=== Oklahoma ===
- Oklahoma Department of Environmental Quality

=== Oregon ===
- Oregon Department of Environmental Quality
- Oregon Department of Forestry
- Oregon Department of Fish and Wildlife
- Oregon Department of Water Resources
- Oregon Watershed Enhancement Board

=== Pennsylvania ===
- Pennsylvania Department of Conservation and Natural Resources
- Pennsylvania Department of Environmental Protection

=== Rhode Island ===
- Rhode Island Department of Environmental Management#The '''Rhode Island Department of Environmental Management (RIDEM)'''

=== South Carolina ===
- South Carolina Department of Health and Environmental Control
- South Carolina Department of Natural Resources

=== South Dakota ===
- South Dakota Department of Environment and Natural Resources

=== Tennessee ===
- Tennessee Department of Environment and Conservation
- Tennessee Wildlife Resources Agency

=== Texas ===
- Texas Commission on Environmental Quality
- Texas Parks and Wildlife Department

=== Utah ===
- Utah Department of Environmental Quality
- Utah Department of Natural Resources
  - Utah Department of Natural Resources Division of Forestry, Fire and State Lands
  - Utah Office of Energy Development

  - Utah Public Lands
  - Utah Division of Wildlife Resources

=== Vermont ===
- Vermont Agency of Natural Resources
  - Vermont Department of Environmental Conservation
  - Vermont Department of Fish and Wildlife
  - Vermont Department of Forests, Parks and Recreation

=== Virginia ===
- Virginia Department of Environmental Quality
- Virginia Department of Agriculture and Consumer Services
- Virginia Department of Conservation and Recreation
- Virginia Department of Forestry
- Virginia Department of Wildlife Resources

=== Washington (state) ===
- Washington State Department of Ecology
- Washington State Department of Natural Resources

=== West Virginia ===
- West Virginia Department of Environmental Protection
- West Virginia Division of Forestry
- West Virginia Division of Natural Resources

=== Wisconsin ===
- Wisconsin Department of Natural Resources

=== Wyoming ===
- Wyoming Department of Environmental Quality

=== Interstate agencies ===
- Atlantic States Marine Fisheries Commission
- Great Lakes Commission
- Interstate Commission on the Potomac River Basin
- Northwest Power and Conservation Council
- Red River Compact Commission
- Susquehanna River Basin Commission
- Tahoe Regional Planning Agency
- Yellowstone River Compact Commission

=== See also ===
US Federal environmental agencies

- Council on Environmental Quality
- Department of Agriculture, including the USFS
- Department of Defense
- Department of Energy
- Department of the Interior, including the BLM, Fish and Wildlife Service, National Park Service, USGS
- US Environmental Protection Agency
- National Oceanic and Atmospheric Administration
- National Drought Policy Commission (defunct)

Territory

- Puerto Rico Department of Natural and Environmental Resources

== Uruguay ==
- Ministry of Environment

== Venezuela ==
- Ministry of Environment and Natural Resources

== Yemen ==
- Ministry of Water and Environment (Yemen)

== See also ==
- Environment minister
- List of agriculture ministries
- List of environmental organizations
- List of forestry ministries
- List of ministers of climate change
