= Ministry of Environment, Forest and Climate Change (Bangladesh) =

Government ministry of Bangladesh

- পরিবেশ, বন ও জলবায়ু পরিবর্তন মন্ত্রণালয়
- Government of Bangladesh Seal

Ministry overview
- Formed: 12 January 1972; 54 years ago
- Jurisdiction: Government of Bangladesh
- Headquarters: Bangladesh Secretariat, Dhaka
- Annual budget: ৳2144 crore (US$170 million) (2026-2027)
- Minister responsible: Abdul Awal Mintoo
- Minister of State responsible: Shaikh Faridul Islam
- Ministry executives: Saimum Parvez, Special Assistant to PM; Dr. Farhina Ahmed, Secretary
- Child agencies: Department of Environment; Forest Department; Bangladesh Climate Change Trust; Bangladesh Forest Research Institute; Bangladesh Forest Industries Development Corporation; Bangladesh Rubber Board
- Website: www.moef.gov.bd

The Ministry of Environment, Forest and Climate Change (Bengali: পরিবেশ, বন ও জলবায়ু পরিবর্তন মন্ত্রণালয়; Paribēś, bana o jalabayou paribarton mantraṇālaẏa) is a ministry of the government of the People's Republic of Bangladesh whose role is ensuring the sustainable environment and optimum forest coverage.

This Ministry was established to look after all environmental matters in Bangladesh, and the Ministry is a permanent member of the Executive Committee of the National Economic Council. The Ministry is a participant in the United Nations Environment Program (UNEP). The main functions of the Ministry include environmental conservation, survey of forest and environmental elements, prevention of environmental degradation and pollution control, afforestation and restoration of degraded areas, and overall protection of the environment. Previously the ministry's name was the Ministry of Environment and Forest. On 14 May 2018, the cabinet changed the name to Ministry of Environment, Forest and Climate Change.

== History ==
From 1947 to 1962, the divisional forest department was under the Conservator of Forests, and subsequently under the Chief Conservator of Forests till 1971. When Bangladesh became independent in 1971, the reserved and proposed reserved forests came under the jurisdiction of the Bangladesh Forest Department. From 1971 to 1989, the Bangladesh Forest Department was under the Ministry of Agriculture. During 1987-89, Forestry was a department of the Ministry of Agriculture, under a Secretary. The Department of Environment (DoE) was established in Bangladesh in 1977 under the Environmental Pollution Control Ordinance, 1977. Finally, the Bangladesh Ministry of Forest and Environment was established in 1989. At the same time, the Forest Department was placed under this Ministry as a technical wing and the Department of Environment was responsible for the implementation of the Environment Protection Act, of 1995.

== Departments of Ministry ==
- Department of Environment
- Forest Department
- Bangladesh Climate Change Trust
- Bangladesh National Herbarium
- Bangladesh Forest Research Institute (BFRI)
- Bangladesh Forest Industries Development Corporation
- Bangladesh Rubber Board

== Significant activities ==
In 2004, the Ministry of Forest and Environment of Bangladesh, in collaboration with the Ministry of Forests of the Government of India, conducted a significant tiger survey in Sundarbans, a unique mangrove forest ecosystem shared by both countries. This survey was part of ongoing efforts to monitor and conserve the Bengal tiger population in this distinctive habitat. Subsequent studies and surveys in the region have focused on the ecological adaptations of Sundarbans tigers, their diet, and movement patterns, contributing valuable information for conservation strategies. Regular tiger population assessments have shown fluctuations in numbers, reflecting the challenges and successes of conservation initiatives. These efforts align with broader regional commitments to tiger conservation, including increasing protected areas and reducing human-tiger conflicts, which have helped stabilize the tiger population in the Sundarbans over time.
