= Wari Thana =

Neighbourhood in Old Dhaka, Bangladesh

Wari ওয়ারী
- Thana
- Location in Bangladesh Wari (Dhaka division)
- Coordinates: 23.714989°N 90.418861°E
- Country: Bangladesh
- Division: Dhaka Division
- District: Dhaka District
- Municipal corporation: Dhaka South City Corporation
- Formed: 2012

Area
  - Total: 2 km^{2} (0.77 sq mi)

Population (2022)
  - Total: 125,015
  - Density: 63,000/km^{2} (160,000/sq mi)
- Time zone: UTC+6 (BST)
- Postal code: 1203
- Area code: 02

Wari (Bengali: ওয়ারী) is a historical neighbourhood and a thana (police jurisdiction) in Dhaka District in Dhaka Division, Bangladesh. Located in the Old Dhaka quarter, it is the first planned neighbourhood in Dhaka city, established in the late 19th century. The area is home to the Baldha Garden, one of the oldest botanical gardens established in this part of Bengal.

== History ==
The origin of the name "Wari" has been subject to debate. While many attribute it to Dhaka's magistrate in 1884 Frederick Wyer, historian Hashem Sufi suggests that it dates back to the Mughal period when troops garrisoned here in large tents, called wari in Persian.

Before the British government gained control of the area in the 19th century, Muslin artisans, known for repairing clothing, inhabited the area. Spanning 700 acres, the whole area was rented as an agricultural settlement in 1839, primarily comprising orchards. Despite rent adjustments, by 1876, a significant portion of Wari had become abandoned and overgrown with jungles.

In 1885, the British administration tasked Wyre with Wari's development as a residential area. Wyre embarked on clearing jungles, constructing roads, and dividing the land into residential plots. Plots were priced at six rupees per bigha and primarily distributed to government employees, with a stipulation that houses must be built within three years, subject to approval by the magistrate. Although plots sold swiftly, full occupancy of the area was delayed likely due to financial constraints of the landowners.

Following its transformation into a residential hub in the early 20th century, Wari was described as having clean thoroughfares and a sparse populace. The dwellings, largely inhabited by middle-class residents, exhibited distinct characteristics, resembling rural homes with predominantly single-storey structures and open lawns. Wari evolved into a Hindu-majority area as government jobs were primarily held by Hindus at the time, most of whom later migrated to India following the partition. As Dhaka expanded and better opportunities arose elsewhere, many families relocated to other areas within the city.

In 2012, Wari Thana was established with a population of approximately 2.6 lakh residents.

== Geography ==
The area of the police jurisdiction is approximately 2 square kilometres (0.77 sq mi), extending from Gopibag Railway Crossing in the north, Nababpur Road in the west, Narinda Road Crossing in the south, and in the east from the Christian cemetery until Swamibag Railway Crossing.

== Demographics ==
Religions in Wari Thana (2022)
| Religion | Percent |
| Islam | 88.79% |
| Hinduism | 11.09% |
| Other or not stated | 0.12% |

According to the 2022 Bangladeshi census, Wari Thana had 33,186 households and a population of 125,015. 6.35% of the population were under 5 years of age. Wari had a literacy rate (age 7 and over) of 90.74%: 92.30% for males and 88.86% for females, and a sex ratio of 118.54 males for every 100 females.

== Gallery ==
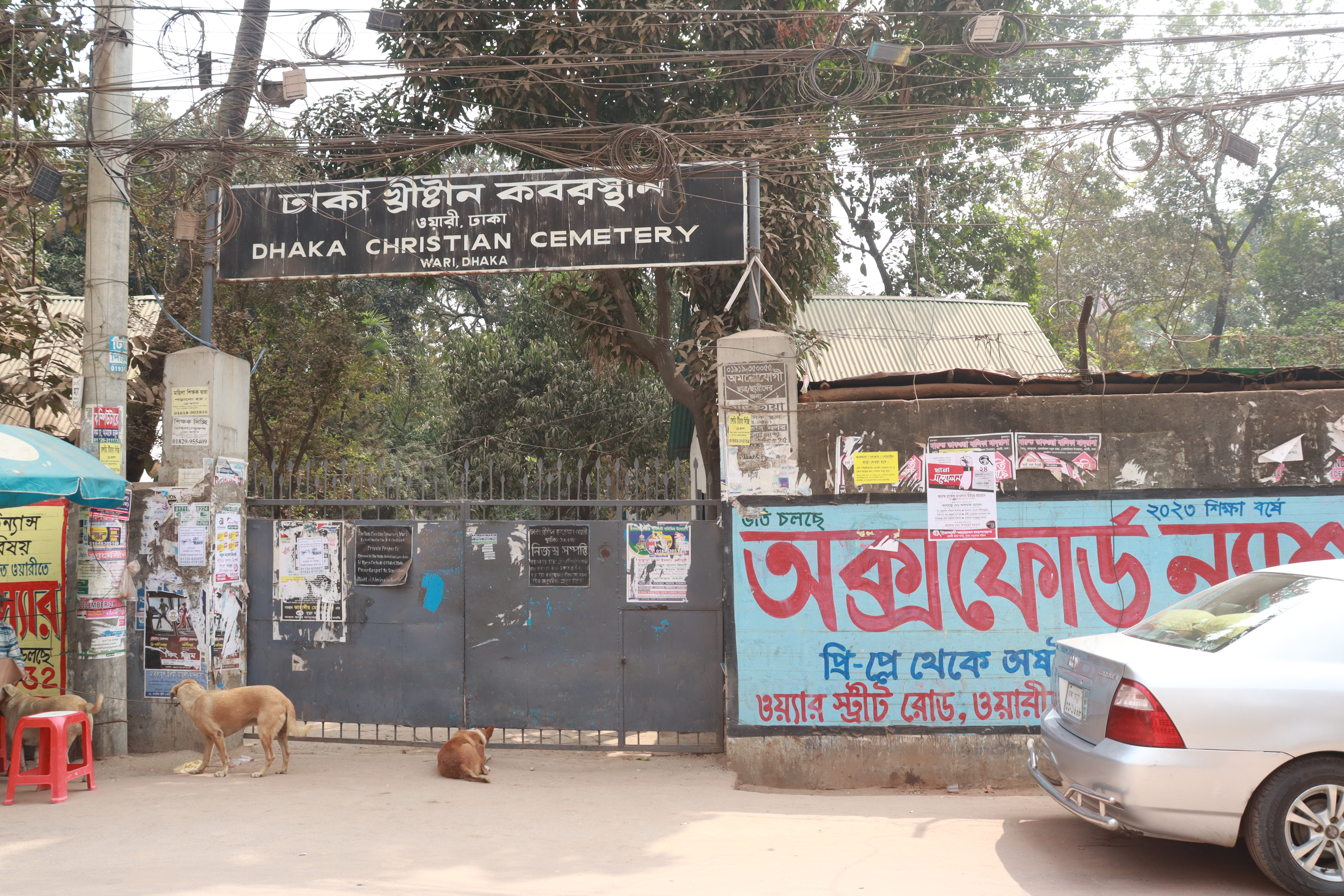
Christian cemetery

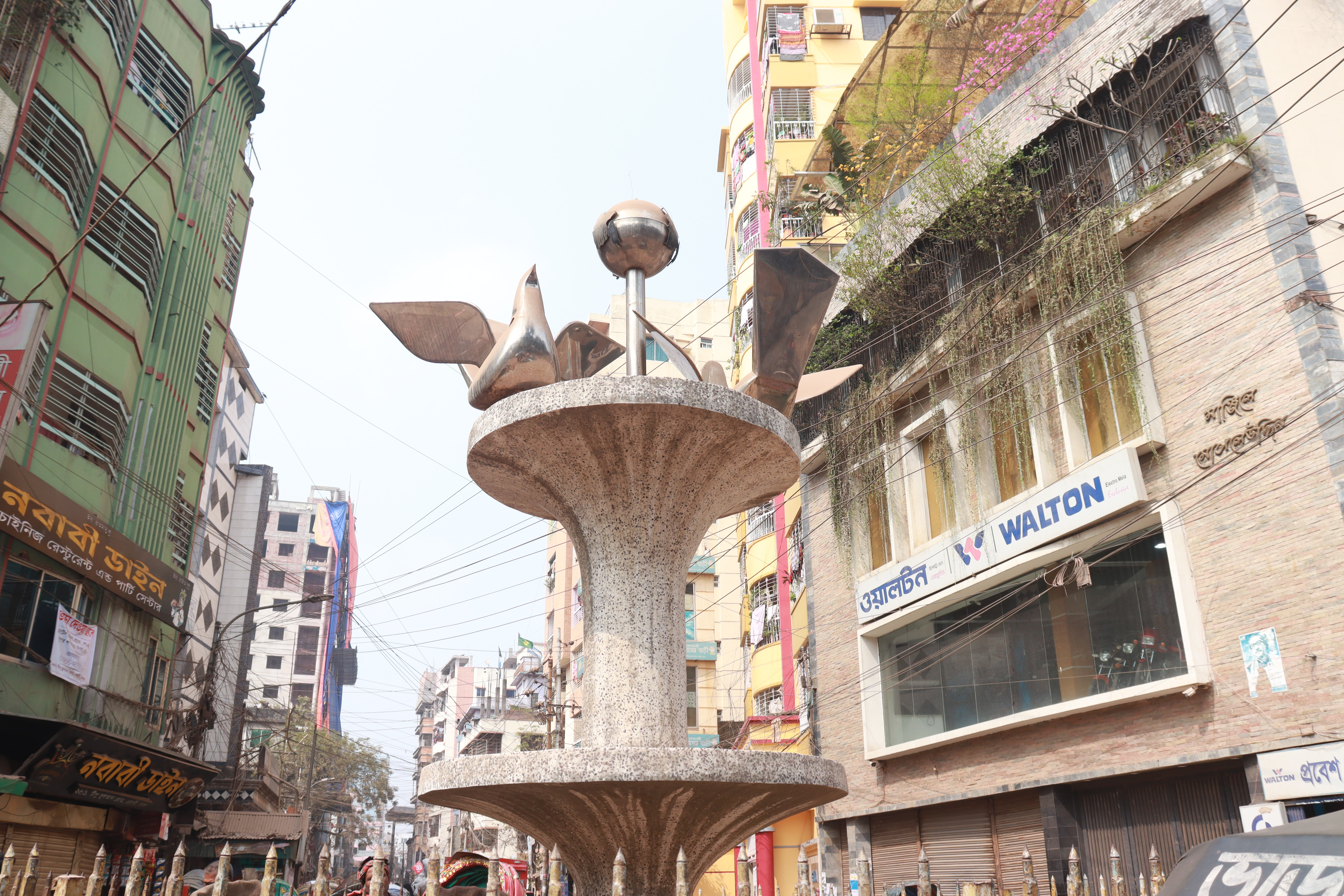
Doel Square

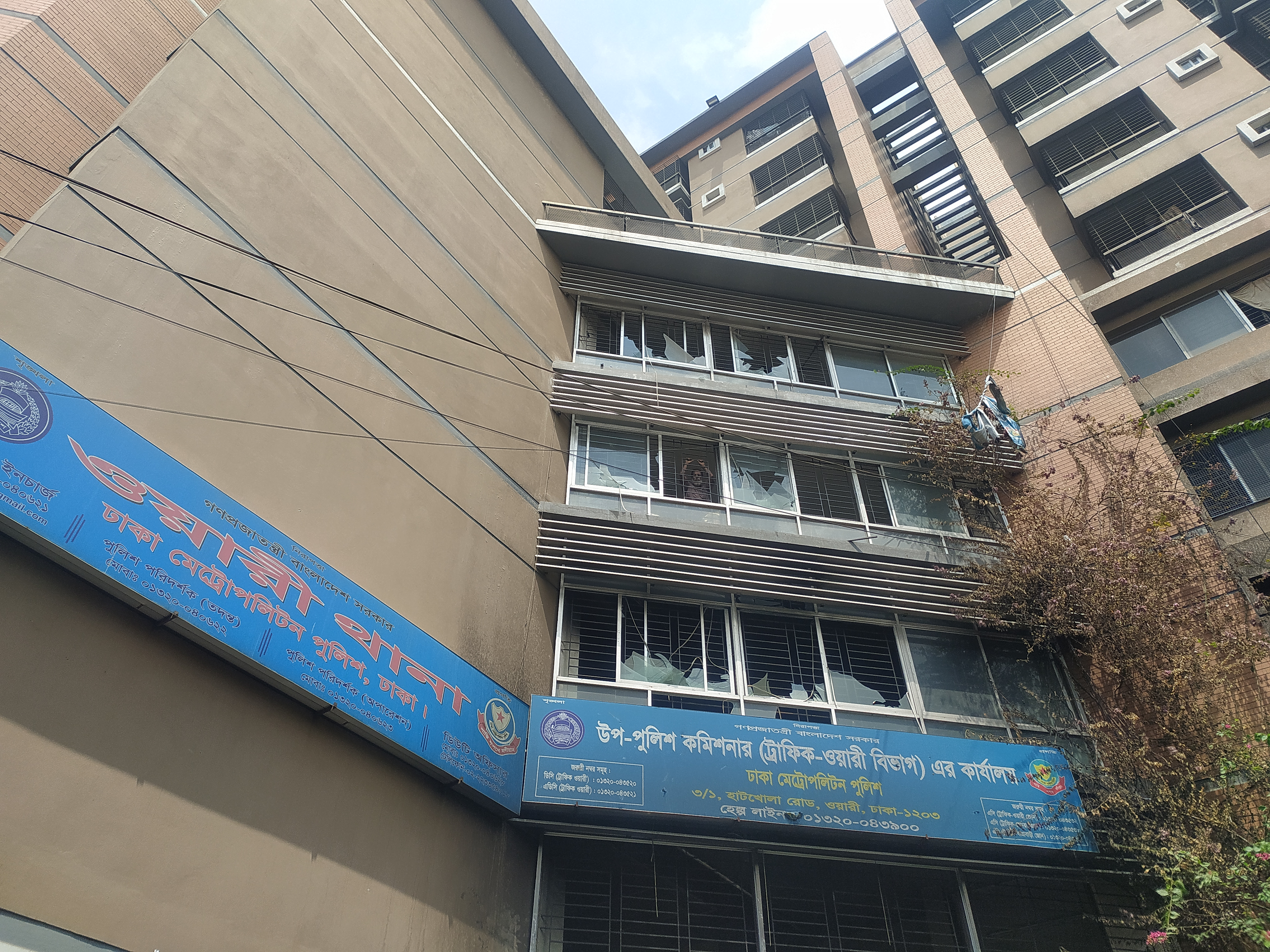
Vandalized Wari police station in 2024
