= Baldha Garden =

Botanical garden in Dhaka, Bangladesh

- বলধা গার্ডেন
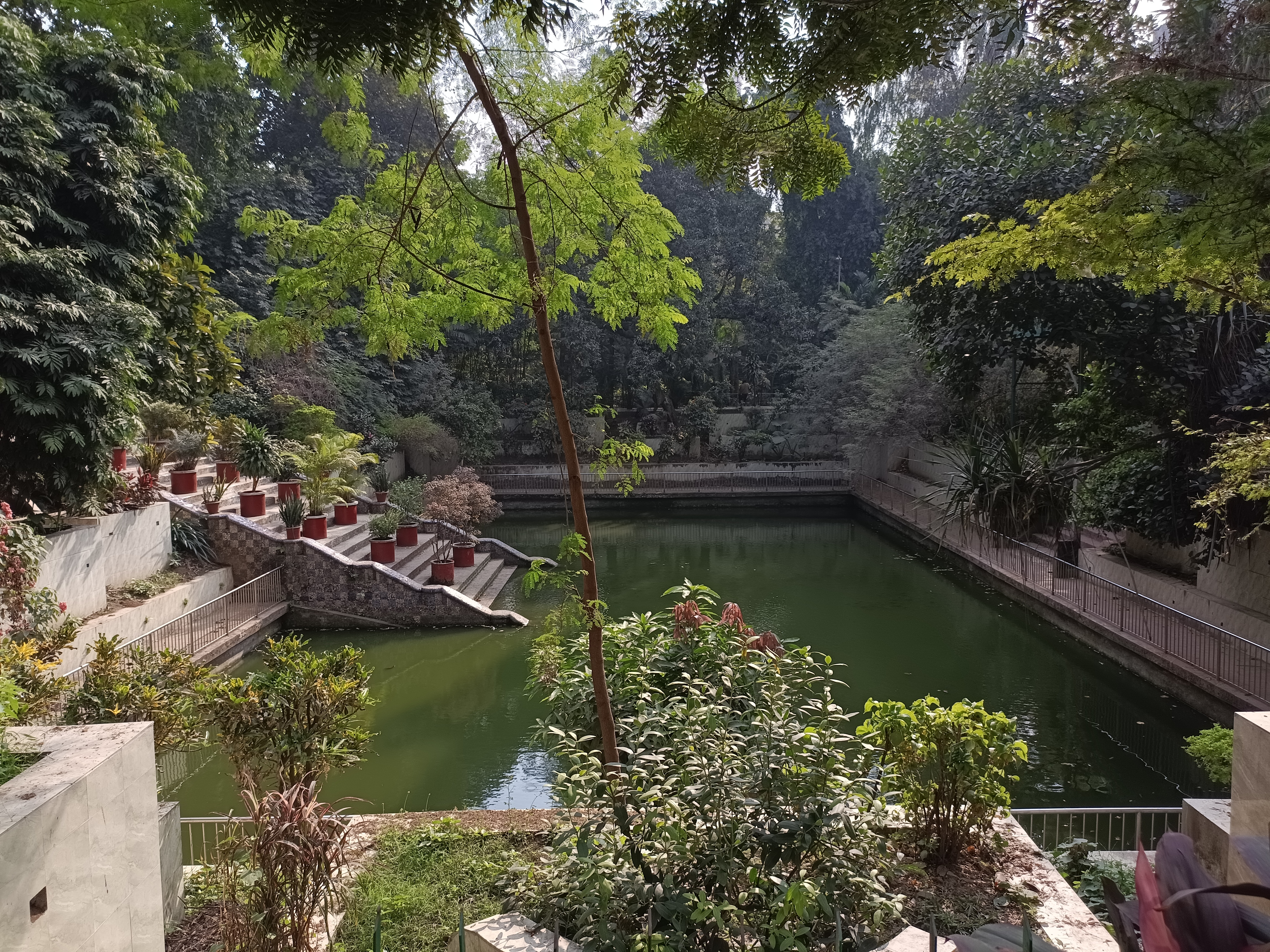
- Baldha Garden, Dhaka

- Location within Bangladesh
- Type: Botanical garden
- Location: Wari, Dhaka, Bangladesh
- Coordinates: 23°43′06″N 90°25′04″E
- Area: 3.15 acres (12,700 m^{2})
- Created: 1909
- Operator: Department of Forestry, Ministry of Environment and Forests.
- Open: All year
- List of Old Dhaka Heritage Sites

Baldha Garden is a botanical garden which spans 3.15 acres (1.27 ha) of land located at Wari in the old part of the city of Dhaka, the capital of Bangladesh. It has a collection of 672 species of plants. The Baldha Garden is now managed as a satellite unit of the National Botanical Garden by the Department of Forestry.

Baldha Garden is one of the oldest botanical gardens in Bangladesh. The garden is enriched with rare plant species collected from different parts of the world.

Visitors expressed dismay in July 2024, over a fivefold increase in entry fee to the garden.

== History ==
Baldha Garden is one of the oldest botanical gardens established in this part of Bengal. Narendra Narayan Roy Chaudhury, landlord of the Estate of Balda, began creating it in 1909 and continued to add to it until his death in 1943. He simultaneously built up a museum collection, which was known as the Balda Museum. The museum collections are now housed at the Bangladesh National Museum.

== Gallery ==
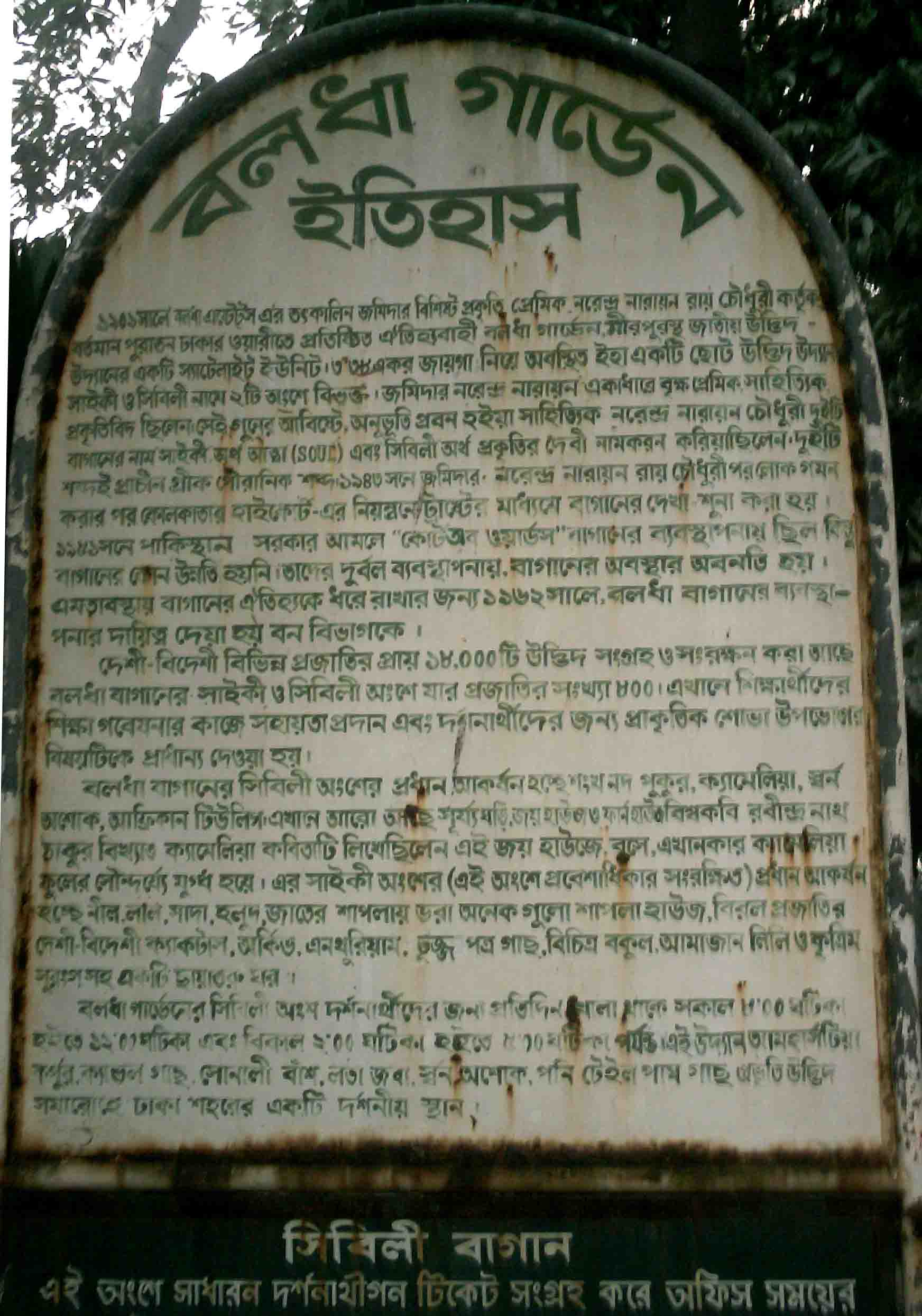

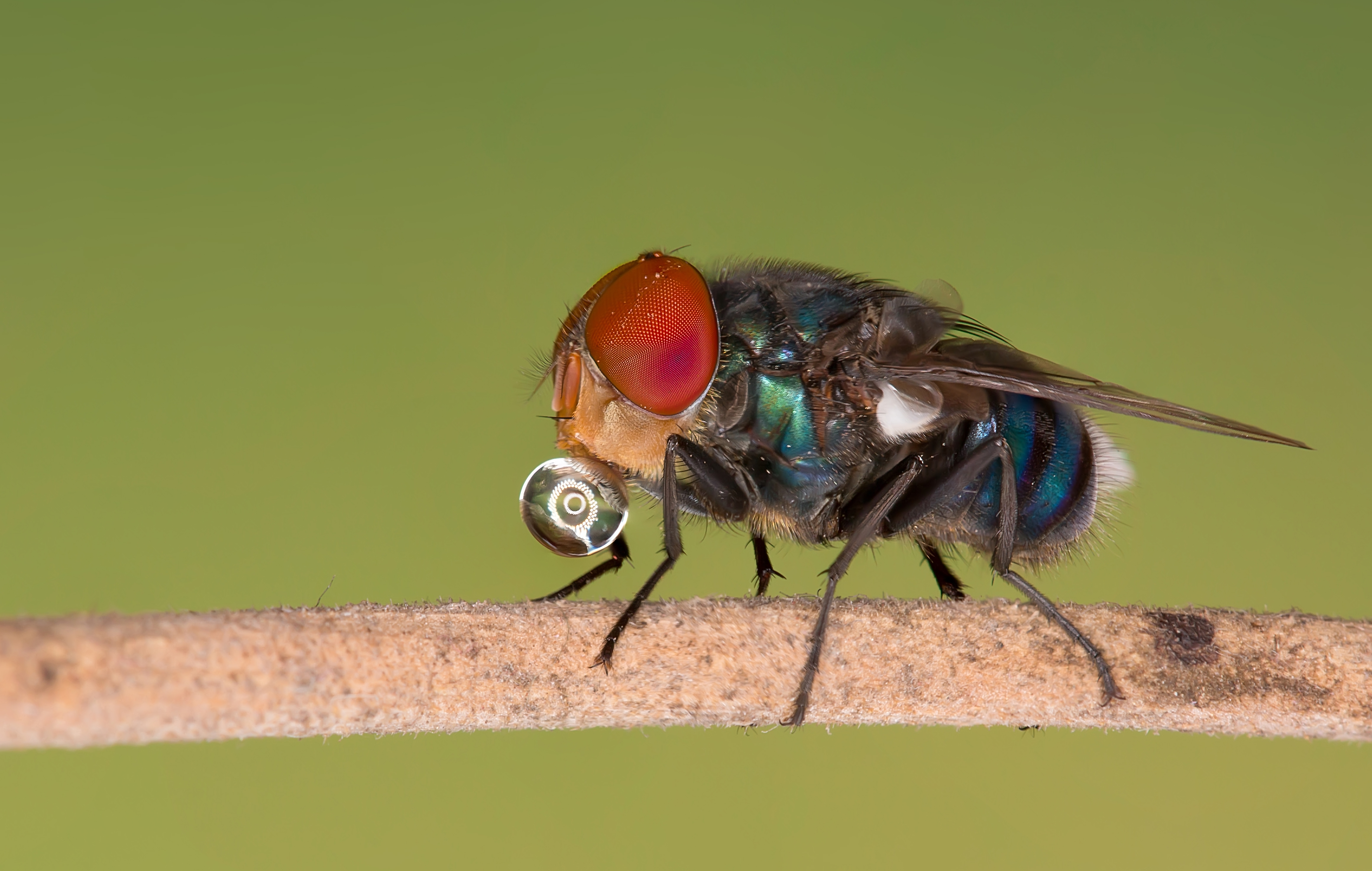

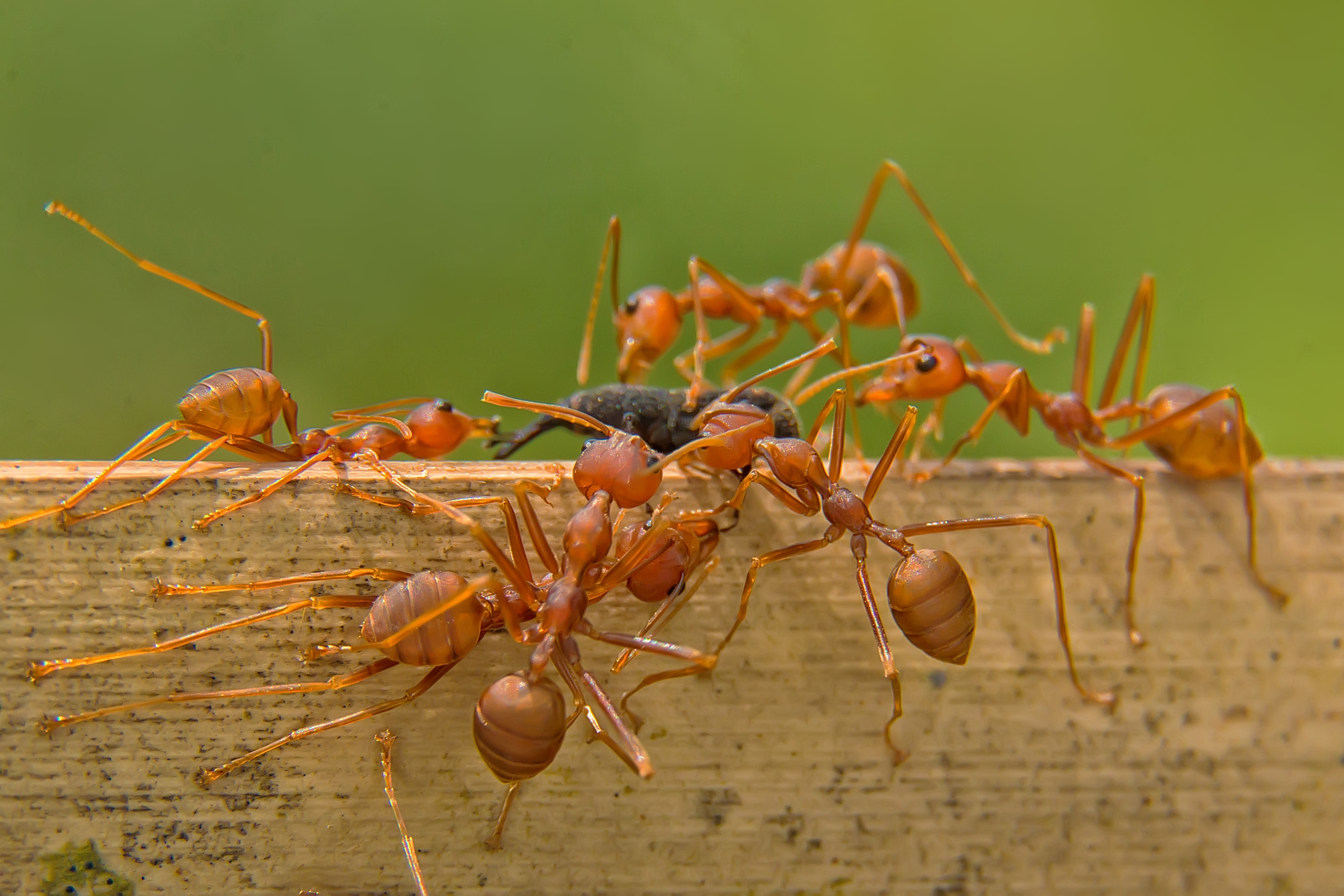

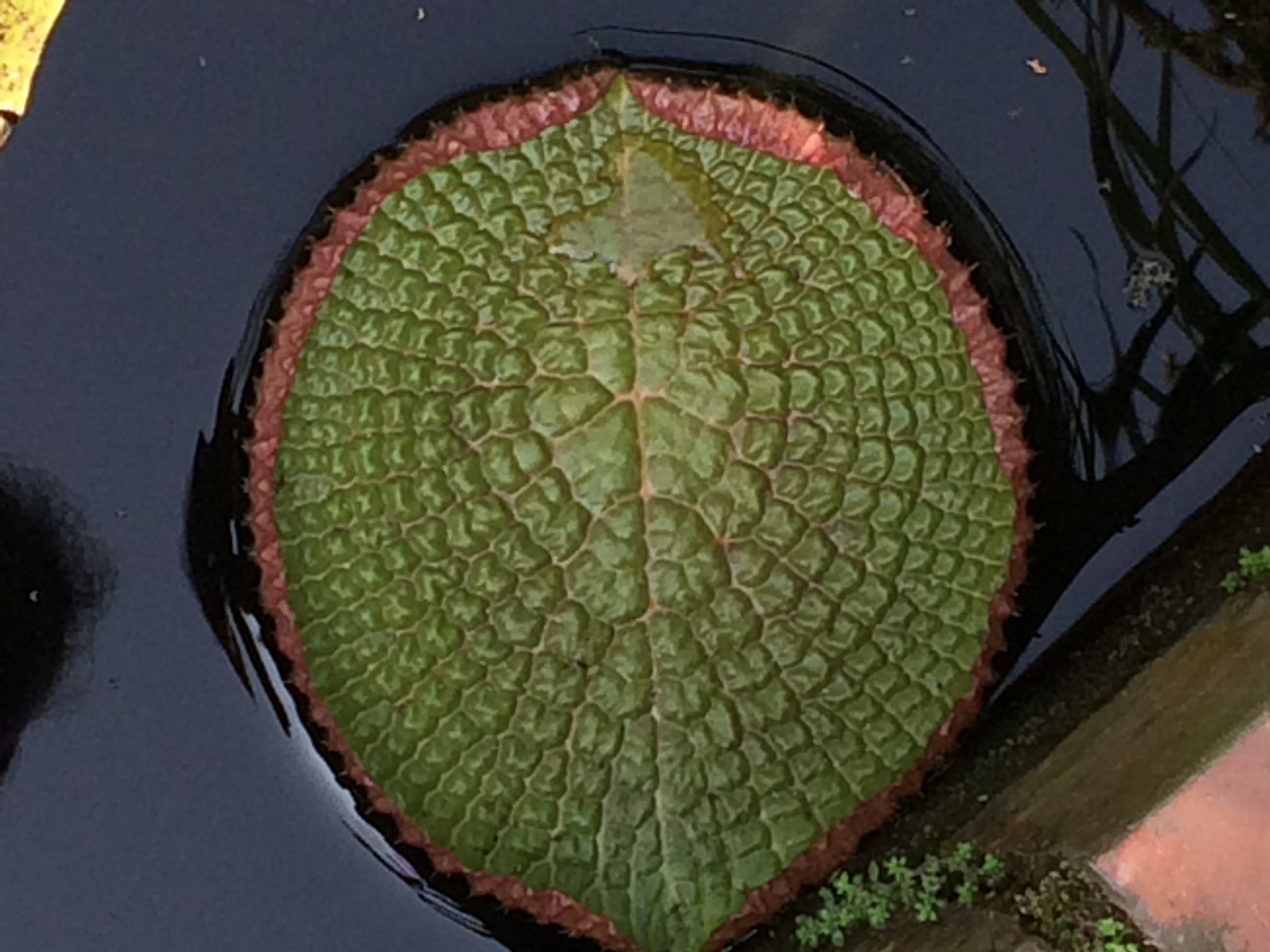

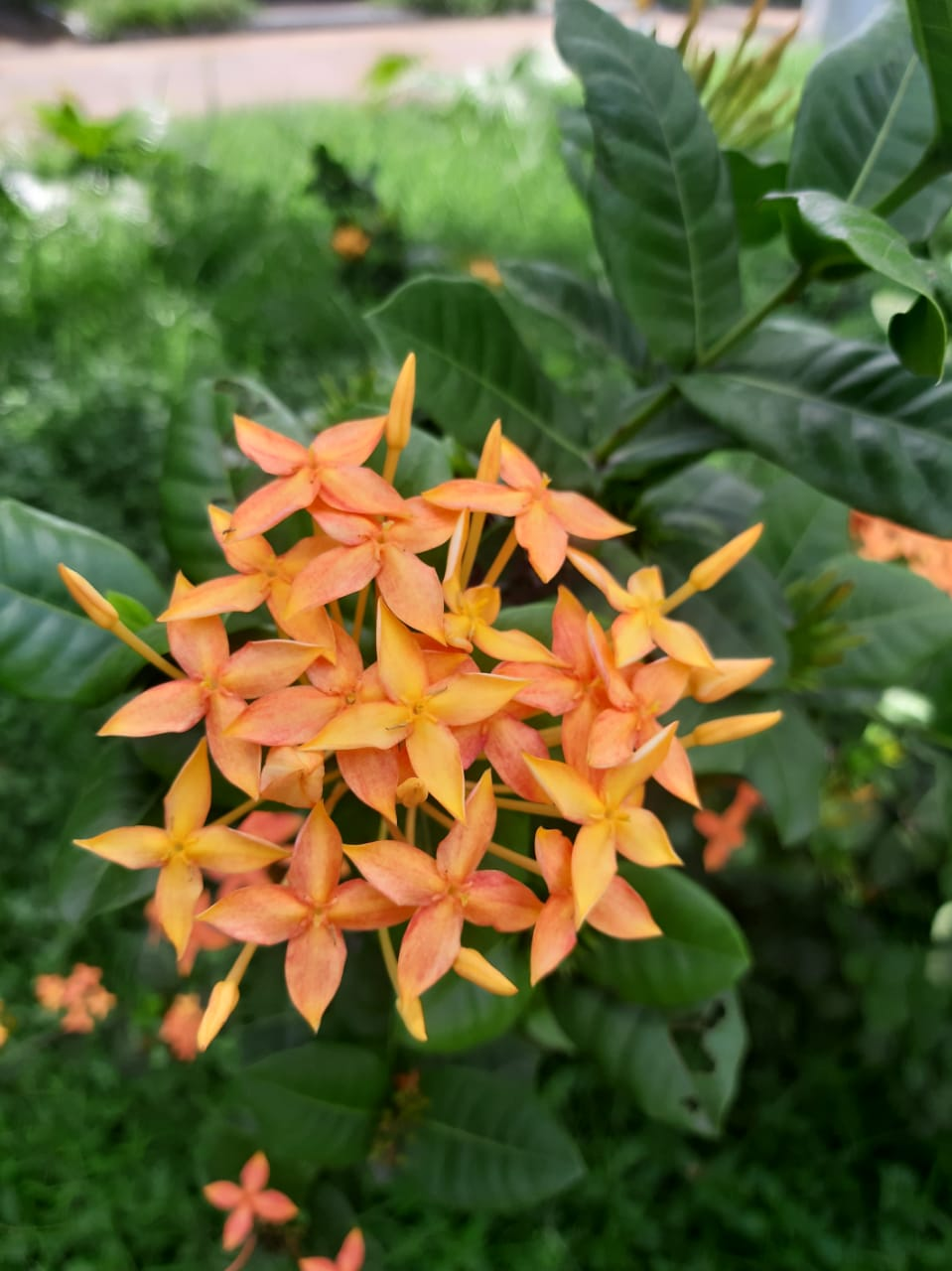

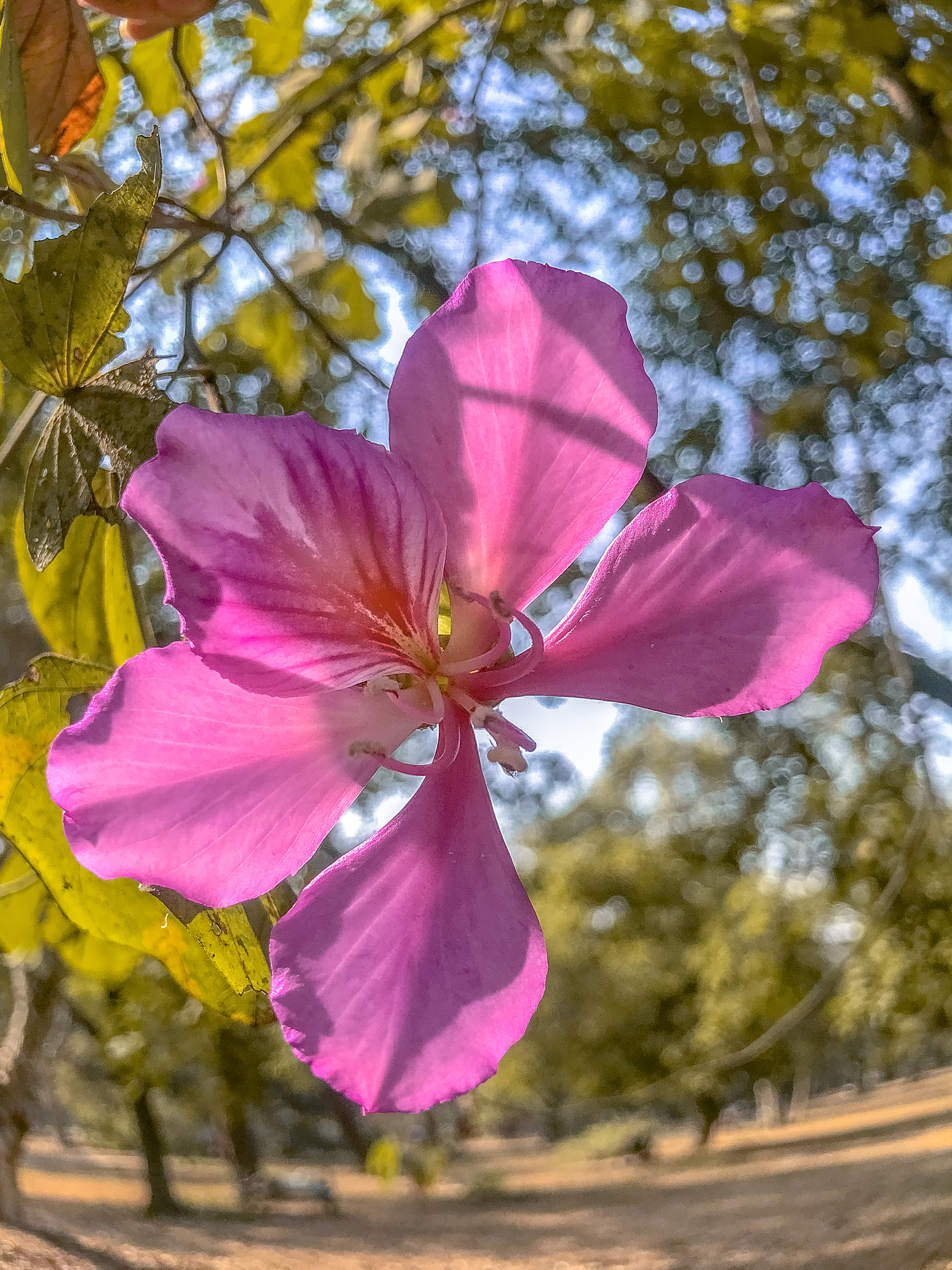

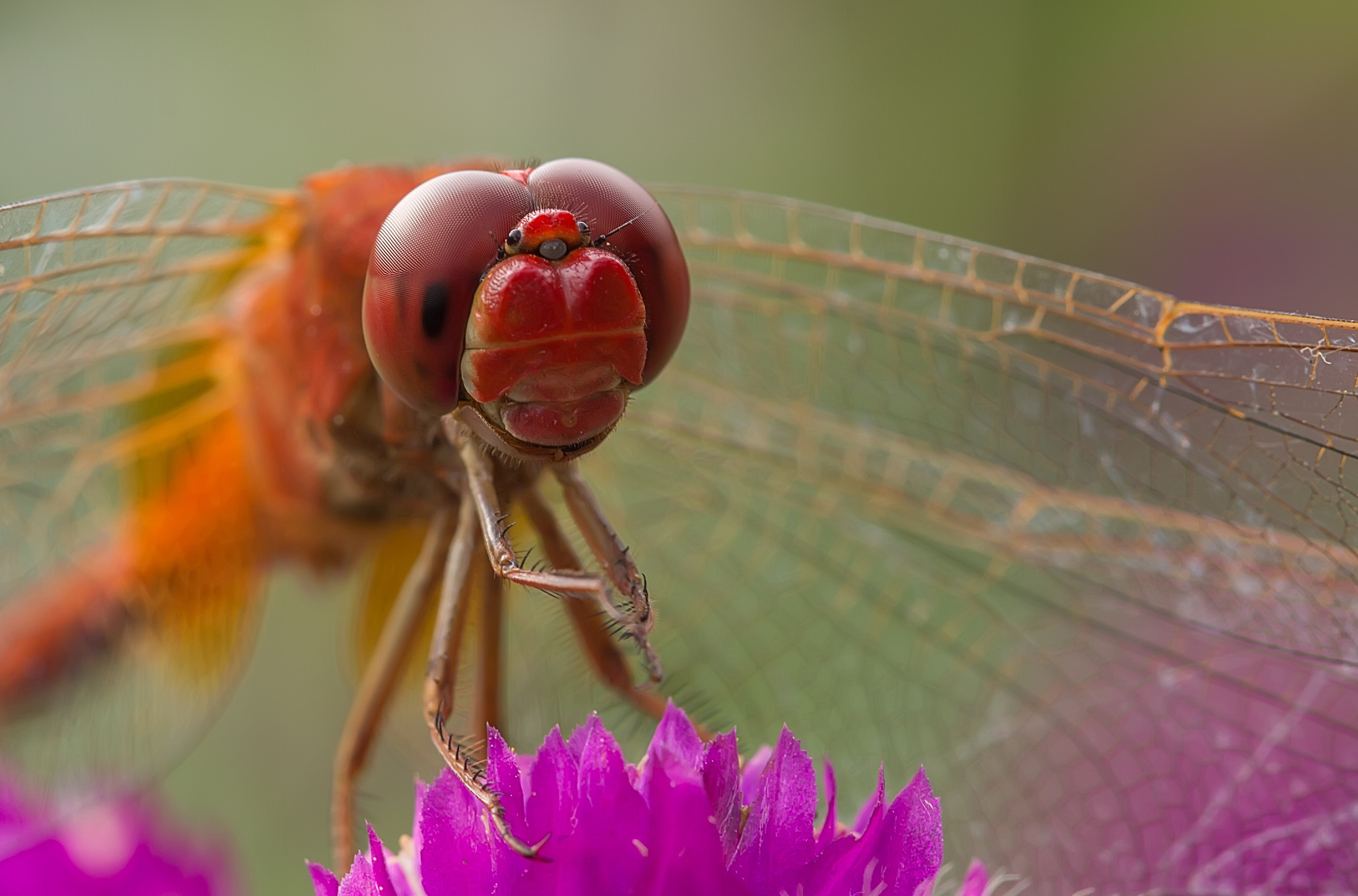

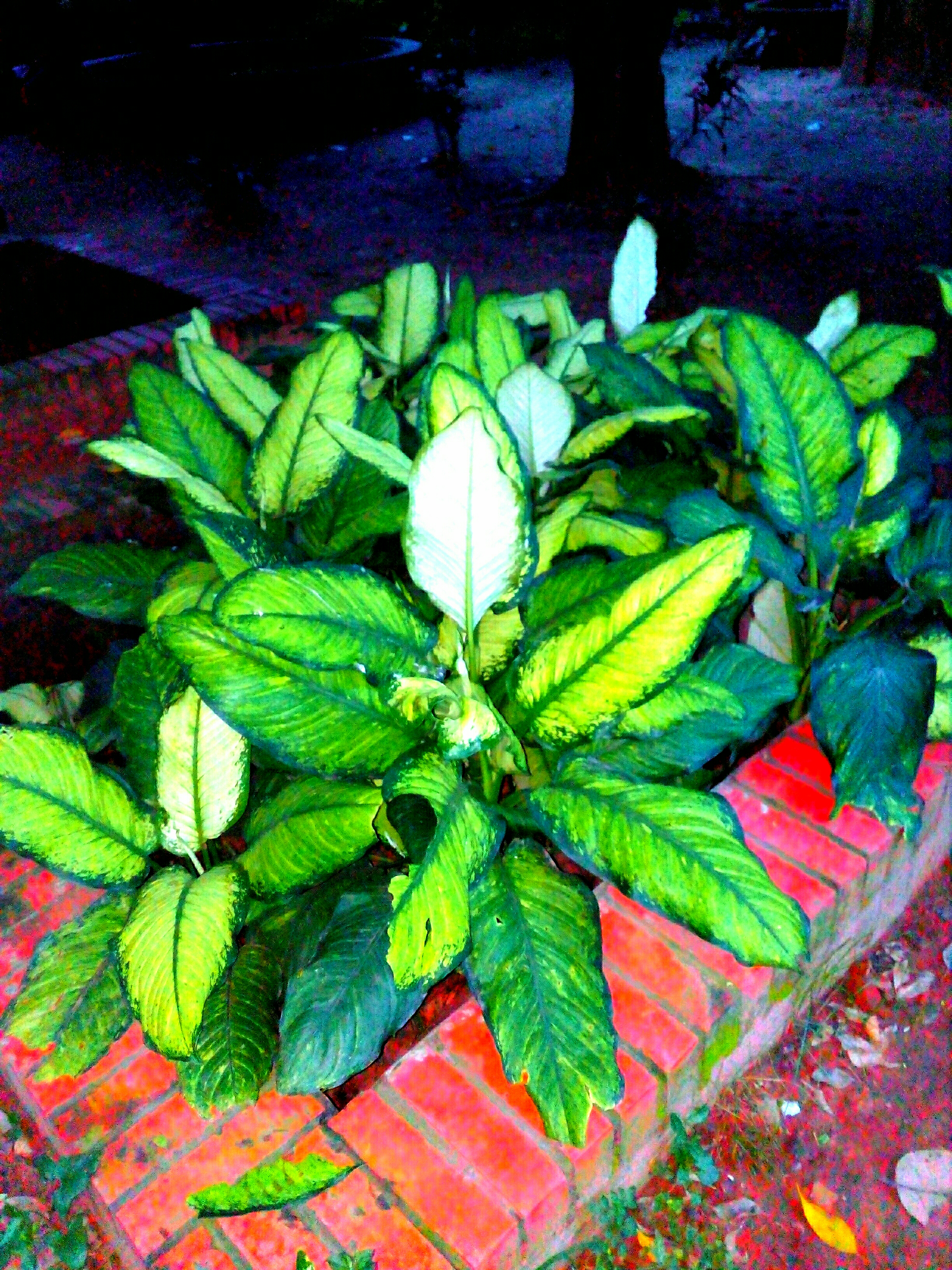

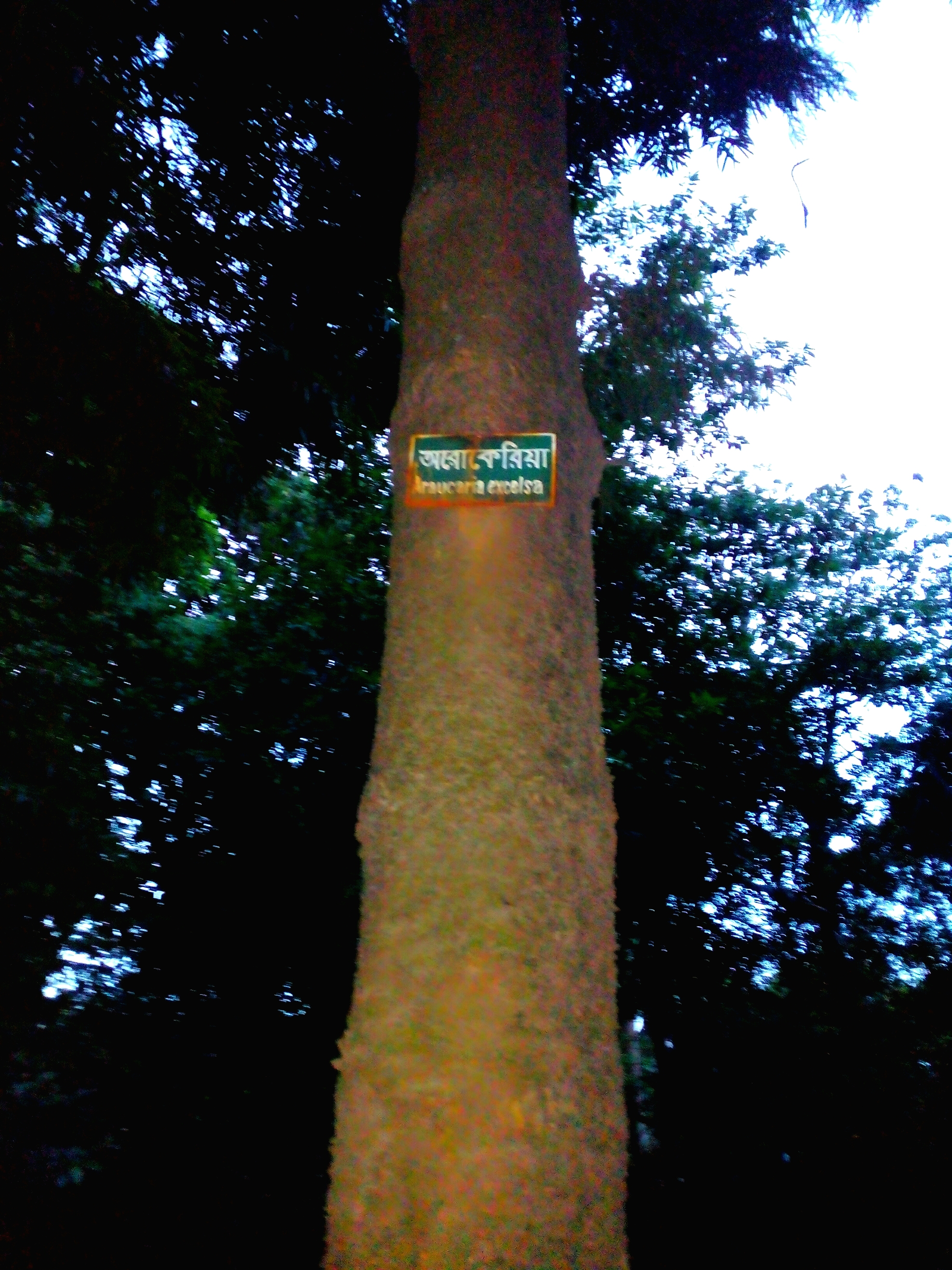

== See also ==
- Christian cemetery in Wari

== Bibliography ==
- Muntasir Mamun, Dhaka: Smriti Bismritir Nogory, Volume-2, Pg- 142–143, Annana Publications.
- Cultural Survey of Bangladesh, Asiatek Society, Architecture, Asiatek Society of Bangladesh.
