= Bangladesh Rubber Board =

Bangladesh governmental department

- Formation: 5 May 2013
- Headquarters: Chittagong, Bangladesh
- Region served: Bangladesh
- Official language: Bengali
- Chairman
- Parent organization: Ministry of Environment, Forest and Climate Change
- Website: www.rubberboard.gov.bd

The Bangladesh Rubber Board (Bengali: বাংলাদেশ রাবার বোর্ড) is an agency under Ministry of Environment, Forests and Climate Change. It was established to develop rubber cultivation in the country. Syeda Sarwar Jahan is the chairman of BRB.

== History ==
The Bangladesh Rubber Board was established on 5 May 2013 through the Bangladesh Rubber Board Act 2013. In October 2016, Bangladesh joined the Association of Natural Rubber Producing Countries. Bangladesh Rubber Board started operations on 30 April 2019.

Almost 70 thousand tons of latex was annually produced in Bangladesh in 2024. The first rubber industrial fair of Bangladesh was held in Chittagong in September 2022.
