= Ministry of Natural Resources and Environment (Russia) =

Government minister of Russia

Ministry of Natural Resources and the Environment of the Russian Federation
- Министерство природных ресурсов и экологии Российской Федерации; Ministerstvo prirodnykh resursov i ekologii Rossiiskoi Federatsii
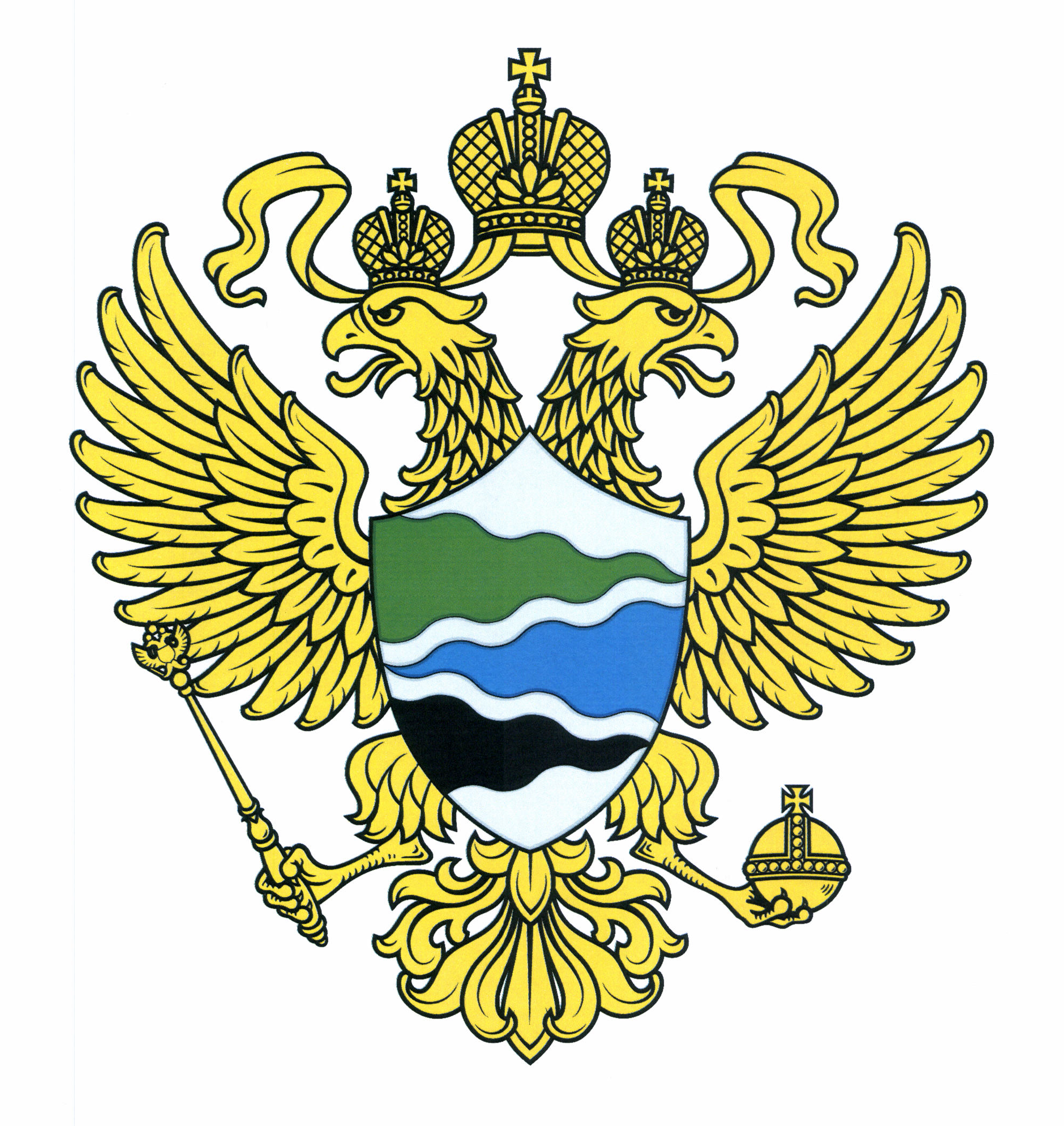

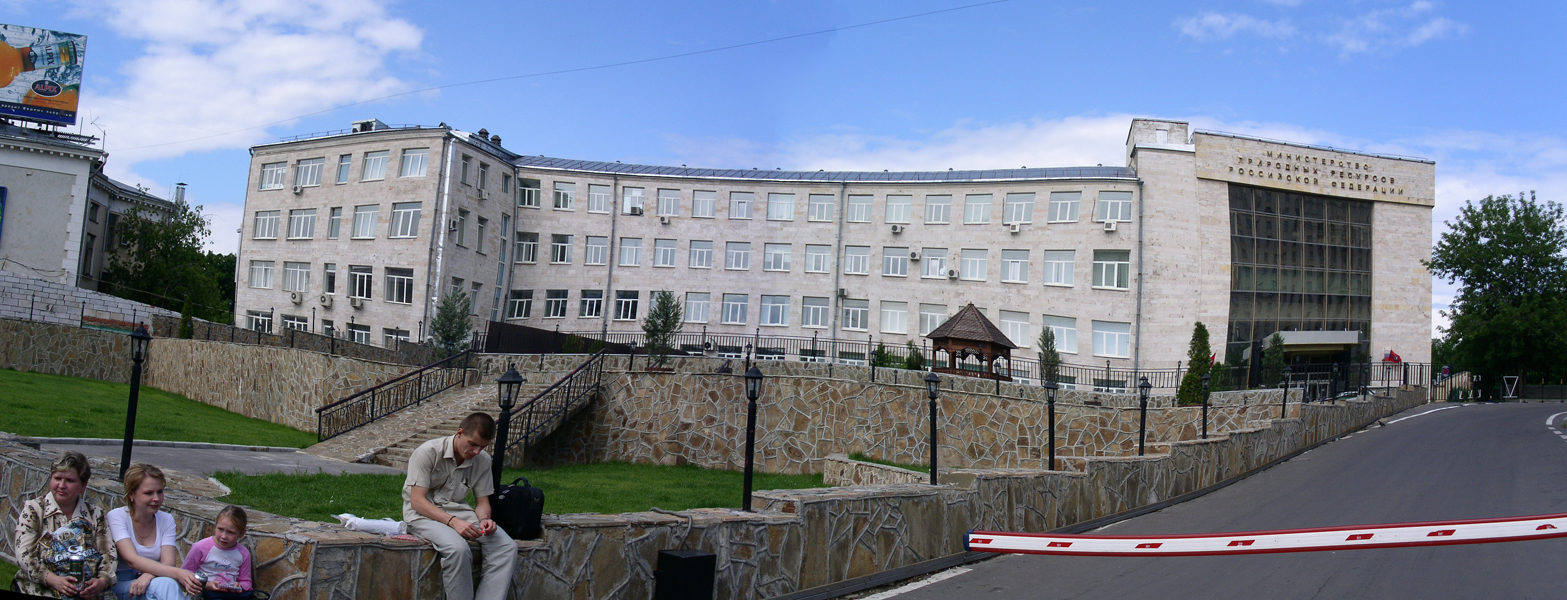
- Russian Ministry of Natural Resources Building in Moscow

Agency overview
- Formed: May 28, 2008
- Jurisdiction: Government of Russia
- Headquarters: 4/6 Bolshaya Gruzinskaya Ulitsa, Moscow, Russia 123995; 55°45′45″N 37°34′49″E
- Minister responsible: Alexander Kozlov, Minister of Natural Resources and Environment
- Child agencies: Federal Service for Hydrometeorology and Environmental Monitoring; Federal Service for Supervision of Natural Resources; Federal Agency of Water Resources; Federal Agency for Mineral Resources; Federal Agency for Forestry
- Website: www.mnr.gov.ru

The Ministry of Natural Resources and Environment of the Russian Federation (Russian: Министерство природных ресурсов и экологии Российской Федерации, romanized: Ministerstvo prirodnykh resursov i ekologii Rossiiskoi Federatsii) is a ministry of the Government of Russia responsible for managing natural resources and the environment.

Alexander Kozlov has served as Minister of Natural Resources and Environment since 10 November 2020.

== History ==
The ancestor of the Ministry of Natural Resources and the Environment is the State Mining and Geological Service, established by Peter the Great on October 2, 1700. After the collapse of the Soviet Union, the Ministry of Environment and the Ministry of Natural Resources were created on August 14, 1996. They were combined to form the Ministry of Natural Resources and the Environment on May 28, 2008.

== Activities ==
The Ministry of Natural Resources and the Environment is responsible for the creation and enforcement of policies and regulations dealing with the environment, including conservation, regeneration, forestry and wildlife protection. It is also responsible for the exploration, management and conservation of the country's natural resources, including the management of the water supply, mineral deposit development, and the exploration of the country's territory and continental shelf. Finally, the Ministry also is in charge of regulating industrial and energy safety, and monitors geological and earthquake activities and development of state police and legal regulation in forestry affairs.

== Departments ==
- The Federal Service for the Supervision of Natural Resources
- Federal Agency for Subsoil Use
- Federal Water Resources Agency
- Federal Service for Hydrometeorology and Environmental Monitoring
- Federal Forestry Agency

== List of ministers of natural resources and environment ==
- Yuri Trutnev (2004–2012)
- Sergey Donskoy (2012–2018)
- Dmitry Kobylkin (2018–2020)
- Alexander Kozlov (2020–present)

== See also ==
- Water supply and sanitation in Russia
- Environment of Russia
- Environmental issues in Russia
