= Federal Agency for Water Resources =

Federal executive body in Russia

- Федеральное агентство водных ресурсов России (Росводресурсы)
- Emblem of the Federal Agency of Water Resources

Agency overview
- Formed: 2004; 22 years ago
- Agency executive: Dmitry Kirillov
- Parent agency: Ministry of Natural Resources and Environment
- Website: Voda.gov.ru

The Federal Agency for Water Resources (Rosvodresursy; Russian: Федеральное агентство водных ресурсов России (Росводресурсы)) is the federal executive body, held by the Ministry of Natural Resources and Environment. It responsible for providing public services, and management of federal property in the field of water resources.

== Duties ==
- Provision within its competence measures for rational use, restoration and protection of water bodies, prevent and eliminate the harmful effects of water;
- The right to use water bodies that are in federal ownership;
- Operation of reservoirs and water systems multi-purpose, safety, and other hydraulic structures under the jurisdiction of the Agency, to ensure their safety;
- Development schemes in the prescribed manner of complex use and protection of water resources, water balances and forecasting of water resources and long-term use and protection of water bodies;
- Ensure the development and implementation of flood control measures, measures for the design and establishment of protection zones of water bodies and coastal protection strips prevent water pollution;
- Provision of public services to provide information related to the condition and use of water bodies, the federally owned;
- Maintenance of the state register of contracts of water bodies, state water cadastre and Russian water works, the state monitoring of water bodies, public accounting of surface water and groundwater.
