= Department of Environment (Bangladesh) =

Bangladesh governmental department

- Formation: 1989
- Headquarters: Dhaka, Bangladesh
- Region served: Bangladesh
- Official language: Bengali
- Director General: Dr. Md. Kamruzzaman, ndc
- Parent organization: Ministry of Environment, Forest and Climate Change
- Staff: 1,133
- Website: doe.gov.bd

Department of Environment (পরিবেশ অধিদপ্তর) is a government department responsible for the protection of the environment in Bangladesh and is located in Dhaka, Bangladesh. The department is headed by a director general. It is under the Ministry of Environment, Forest and Climate Change.

== History ==
Environmental conservation is one of the most discussed topics internationally. The existence of life on Earth is threatened among other things due to climate change as a result of continuous environmental pollution. For a long time, environmentalists worldwide have tried to get world leaders to focus on these and other pressing environmental issues. One of the first international collective efforts was the 1972 Stockholm Conference on the Human Environment. These efforts were given a new impetus by the Earth Summit in Rio de Janeiro, Brazil in 1992. In addition to being affected by global environmental problems, Bangladesh is also a victim of local and regional problems. Bangladesh faces both natural and man-made environmental problems. The main environmental problems of Bangladesh can be traced to the problems of overpopulation and poverty. These are: deforestation, deteriorating water quality, natural disasters, land degradation, salinity, unplanned urbanization, unplanned sewage, industrial waste disposal, etc.

Soon after the Stockholm Conference on Human Environment in 1972, the first environmental activities were undertaken in Bangladesh. As a follow-up step to the Stockholm Conference, after the promulgation of the Water Pollution Control Ordinance in 1973, a project primarily aimed at water pollution control was taken up, funded by the Government of Bangladesh, under the supervision of the Directorate of Public Health and Engineering with 27 staff members. Later in 1977, the Environment Pollution Control Board with 16 members headed by a member of the Planning Commission, and the Environment Pollution Control Cell headed by a Director with 26 staff were established. It was followed by the establishment of the Environment Pollution Control Project in 1977, the establishment of the Pollution Control Department in 1985, and finally, in 1989, it was reorganized as the Department of Environment, whose operations were overseen by a Director General. Along with the head office, this department performs its duties through eight divisional offices in Dhaka, Chittagong, Khulna, Bogra, Barisal, Rangpur, Mymensingh, and Sylhet, and 50 district offices. Recently, the government has set up 21 new district offices at the district level creating 468 new posts. As a result, the manpower of the Department of Environment has increased to 1,133.

Following the United Nations Conference on the Human Environment in Stockholm in 1972, the government of Bangladesh founded the Department of Public Health Engineering and passed the Water Pollution Control Ordinance in 1973. In 1977, the Environment Pollution Control Cell was created with 26 members. In 1989, the Government of Bangladesh created the Department of Environment from the Environment Pollution Control Cell and the Department of Public Health Engineering. The department regulates pollution and can fine polluting industries. Factories and industries need regulatory approval from the department to operate.
