= Federal Agency for Mineral Resources =

- Федеральное агентство по недропользованию (Роснедра)
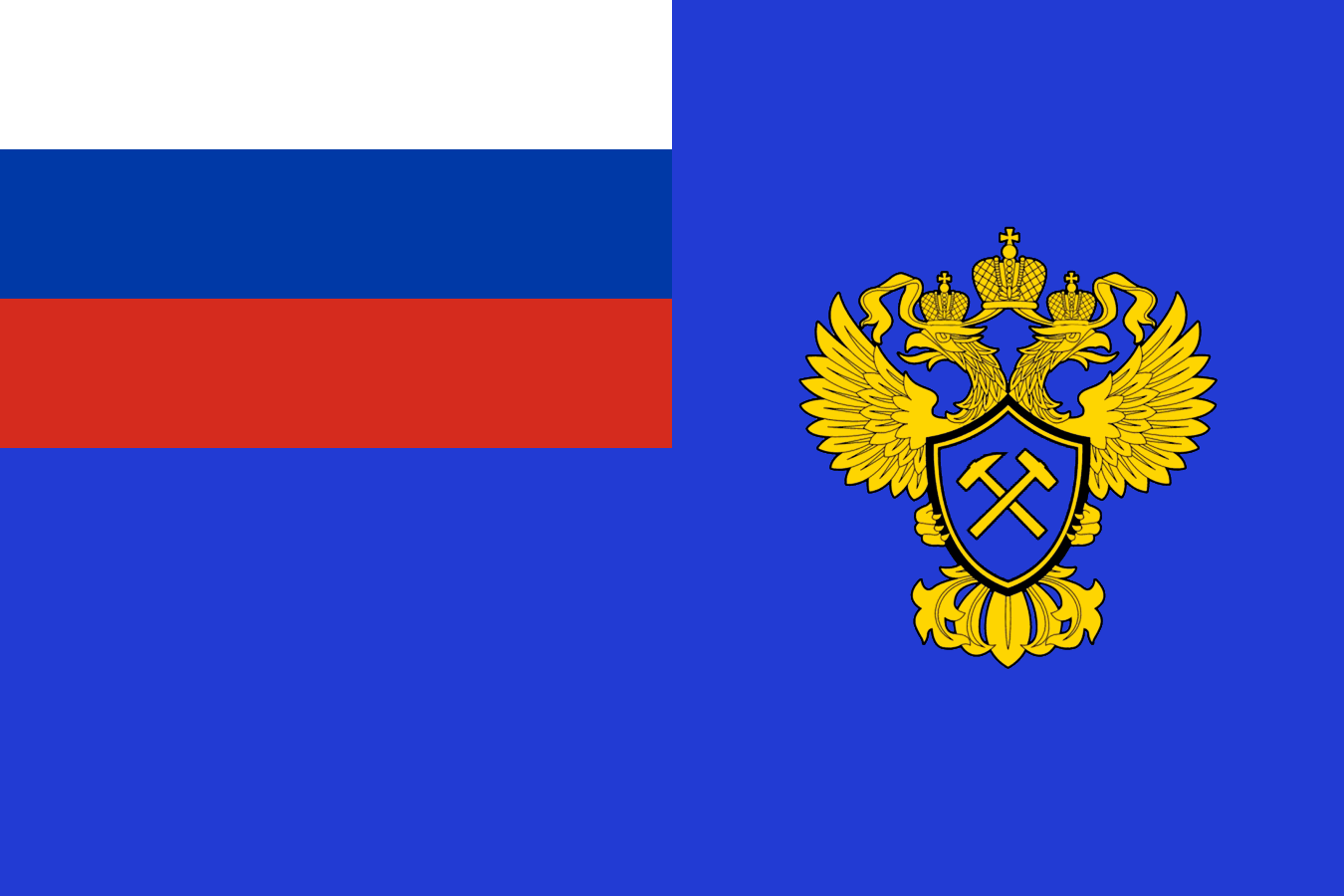
- Flag of the Federal Agency for Mineral Resources

Agency overview
- Formed: 2004; 22 years ago
- Headquarters: Bolshaya Gruzinskaya ulitsa, 4/6, Moscow, Russia
- Agency executive: Yevgeni Kiselyov
- Parent agency: Ministry of Natural Resources and Environment
- Website: Rosnedra.gov.ru

The Federal Agency for Mineral Resources (Rosnedra; Russian: Федеральное агентство по недропользованию (Роснедра), romanized: Federal'naya agentstvo po nedropol'zovaniyu) is a federal body that enacts policy and exercises oversight over subsoil use in the Russian Federation. It was formed in 2004 as part of Russia's Ministry of Natural Resources and Environment.
