= Bangladesh Forest Research Institute =

Research institute in Bangladesh

Coordinates: 22.893°N 91.533°E

Bangladesh Forest Research Institute; বাংলাদেশ বন গবেষণা ইনস্টিটিউট
- Established: 1955
- Focus: Forestry
- Staff: 720
- Formerly called: East Pakistan Forest Research Laboratory
- Location: Chattogram, Chattogram Division, Bangladesh
- Website: bfri.gov.bd

Bangladesh Forest Research Institute (BFRI) is an institute for forestry research in Bangladesh, located at Sholashahar, Chattogram.

== History ==
Bangladesh Forest Research Institute was established in 1955 as East Pakistan Forest Research Laboratory, BFRI works under the auspices of the Ministry of Environment, Forest and Climate Change. Aside from its headquarter in Chattogram, BFRI has 21 research stations and sub-stations under five field divisions covering different forest types spread over eight dendrological regions of the country.

== Research divisions ==
- Forest management branch
  - Silvicultural research
  - Silviculture genetics
  - Seed orchard
  - Mangrove silviculture
  - Plantation Trial Unit
  - Minor forest products
  - Forest botany
  - Forest economics & statistics
  - Forest inventory
  - Soil science
  - Forest protection
- Forest products branch
  - Wood working & timber engineering
  - Seasoning & timber physics
  - Veneer & Composite wood products
  - Wood preservation
  - Pulp and paper
  - Forest chemistry

== See also ==
- List of forest research institutes
