= Bangladesh Climate Change Trust =

Government trust in Bangladesh

Agency logo

The Bangladesh Climate Change Trust is a government trust in Bangladesh that utilises funds to take action against problems caused by climate change. The trust fund has operated since 2010, and collaborates with government ministries as well as NGOs and the private sector to implement and evaluate climate change mitigation projects.

== History ==
The Bangladesh Climate Change Trust (BCCT) was established on 13 October 2010 through the passage of the Climate Change Trust Act, 2010. It works under the Ministry of Environment and Forests. In April 2017, Mohammad Iqbal the chairman of Bangladesh Chemical Industries Corporation was transferred to the BCCT as its managing director by the Government of Bangladesh. He has since refused to leave his previous position and is now lobbying to get his transfer cancelled. The government of Bangladesh has allocated $400 million to the fund.

== Functions ==
The official website of the BCCT lists the fund as having a range of functions in regards to the funding of climate change mitigation projects:

- The overall management of the Climate Change Trust Fund
- Provide secretarial support to the Trustee Board on Climate Change and Technical Committee
- Review projects from different government ministries/divisions
- Coordinate with different government ministries/divisions to progress climate change mitigation projects
- Connect with beneficiaries, civil society, NGO, private sector and international organizations related to climate change
- Undertake monitoring and evaluation of projects under implementation

== See also ==
- Climate Change in Bangladesh
