= National Botanical Garden of Bangladesh =

Plant conservation centre in Dhaka, Bangladesh

Bangladesh National Botanic Garden and Herbarium
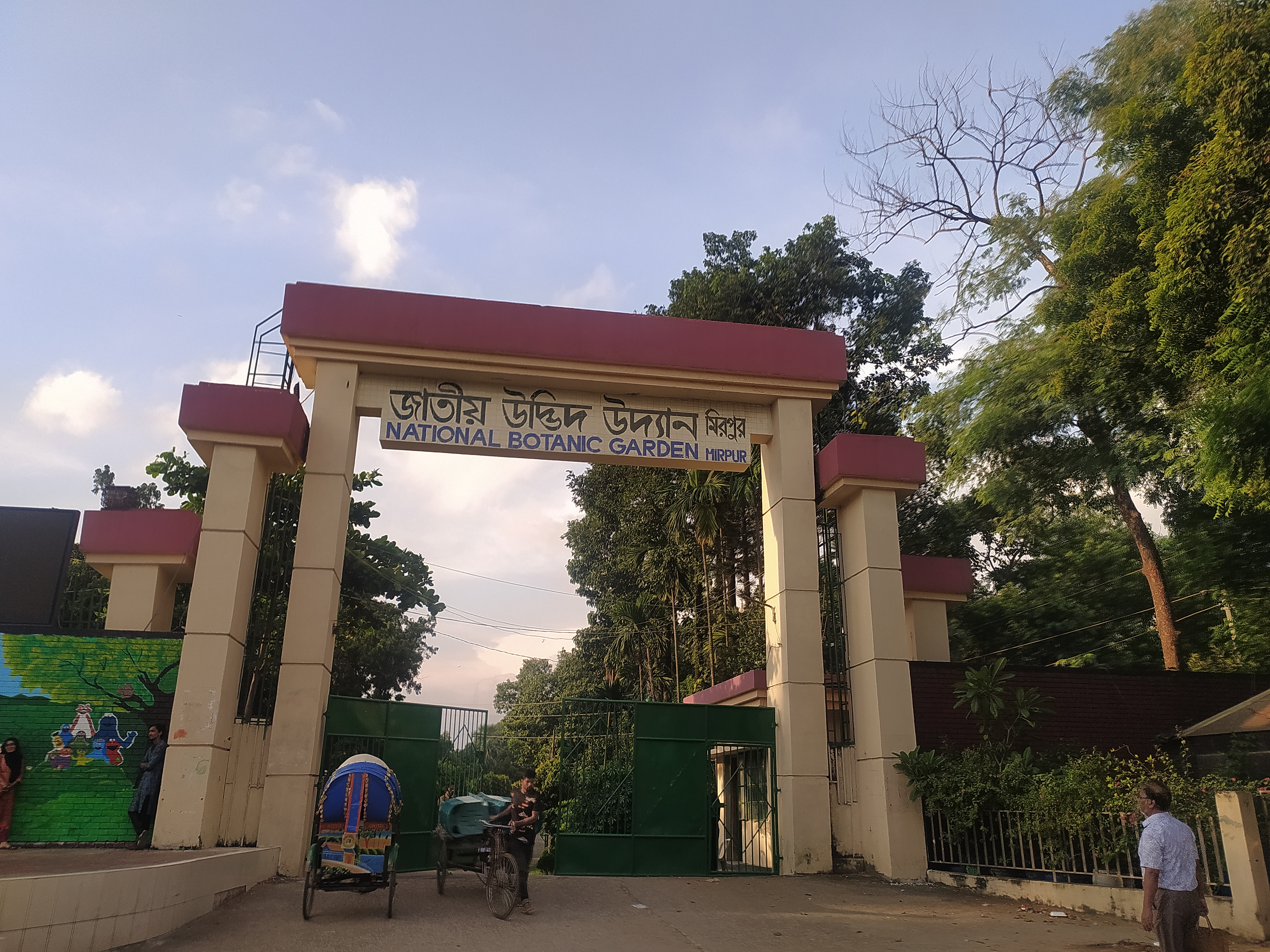
- Garden Entrance

- Location within Bangladesh
- Type: Botanic Garden
- Location: Mirpur, Dhaka, Bangladesh
- Coordinates: 24°00′N 90°00′E
- Area: 84 hectares
- Created: 1961
- Operator: Department of Forestry, Environment and Forests, Bangladesh
- Status: Open all year

The National Botanic Garden of Bangladesh and the Bangladesh National Herbarium make up the largest plant conservation center in Bangladesh, with an area of around 84 hectares (210 acres). It is located at Mirpur-2 in Dhaka - 1216, beside the Bangladesh National Zoo. It was established in 1961. It is a botanic garden, a knowledge center for nature lovers and botanists and a tourist destination. The herbarium has a scientific collection of approximately 100,000 preserved specimens of plants.

Baldha Garden which is in the Wari area of Dhaka is administratively part of the National Garden.

== Maintenance ==
The garden provides learning and recreational facilities adjacent to the Bangladesh National Zoo. It is divided into 57 sections, and is managed by Forest Department under Ministry of Environment and Forests, Government of Bangladesh.

== Living collections ==
Bangladesh National Herbarium's collection of plant and tree species is large. The garden houses about 56,000 individual trees, herbs, and shrubs including a huge collection of aquatic plants. Rare and exotic plant species in the garden include:

- Anthurium (Anthurium crystallinum)
- Camphor (Cinnamomum camphora)
- Rabbit fern (Davallia canariensis)
- Dambia (Dombeya spectabilis)
- White rangan (Ixora superba)
- Little mussanda (Mussaenda luteola)
- Victoria amazonica
- Harhjora (Cissus quadrangularis)
- African tulip tree (Spathodea campanulata)
- Sambucas (Sambucus nigra)
- White Chandan (Santalum album).

== Other facilities ==
A modern vegetative propagation arrangement and a tissue culture laboratory have been established in the garden for the propagation of rare species. Initially, tissue culture of orchids and other rare species has been adopted. Besides, a huge rose garden, crisscrossing lake, watch deck, artificial waterfall, bridge over the lake, and above all the thousands of migratory birds in winter are the main attractions of the National Botanic Garden. Every morning many people come here for their morning walk, exercise, yoga, and meditation session.

== Gallery ==
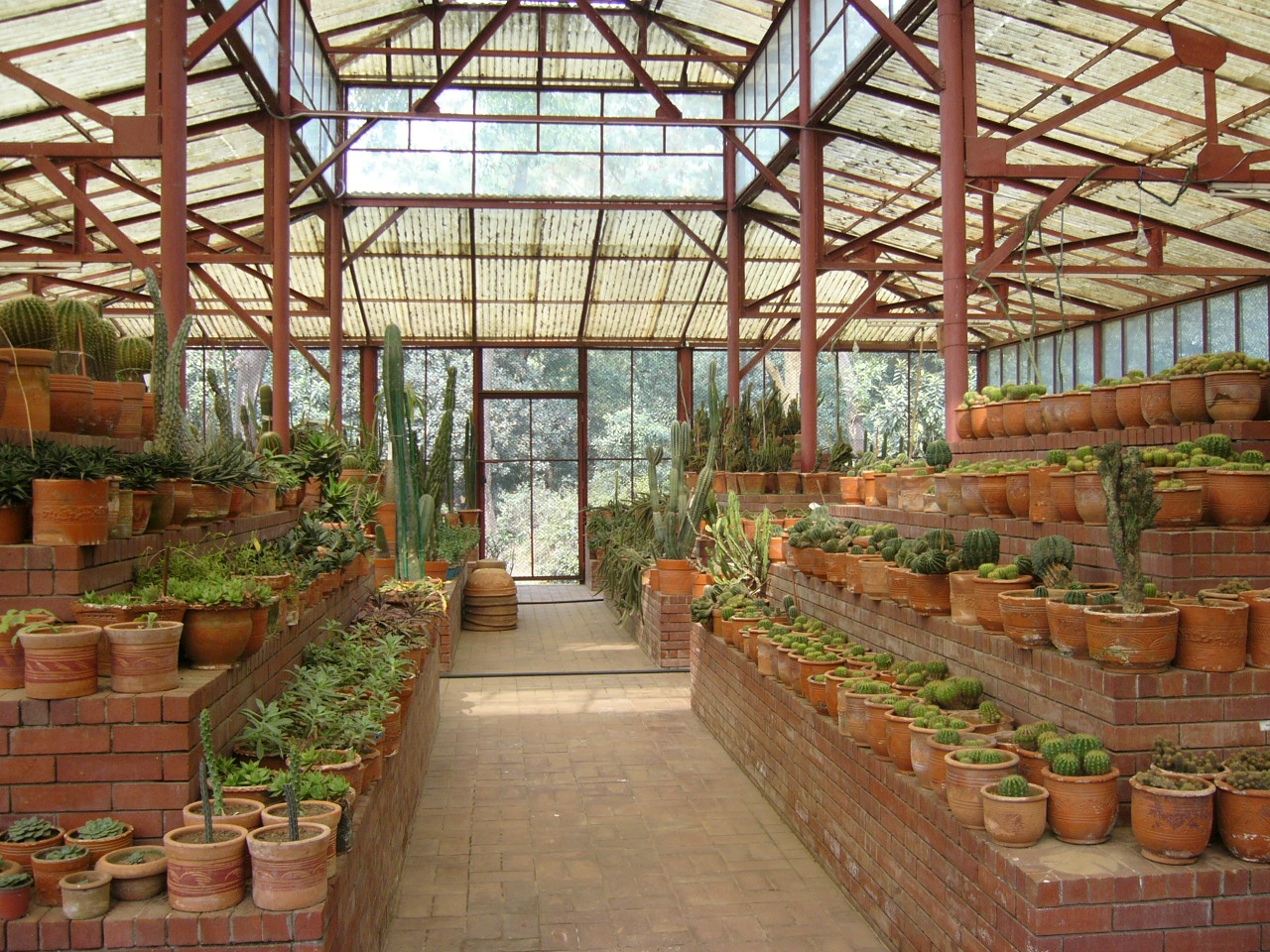
Cactus house

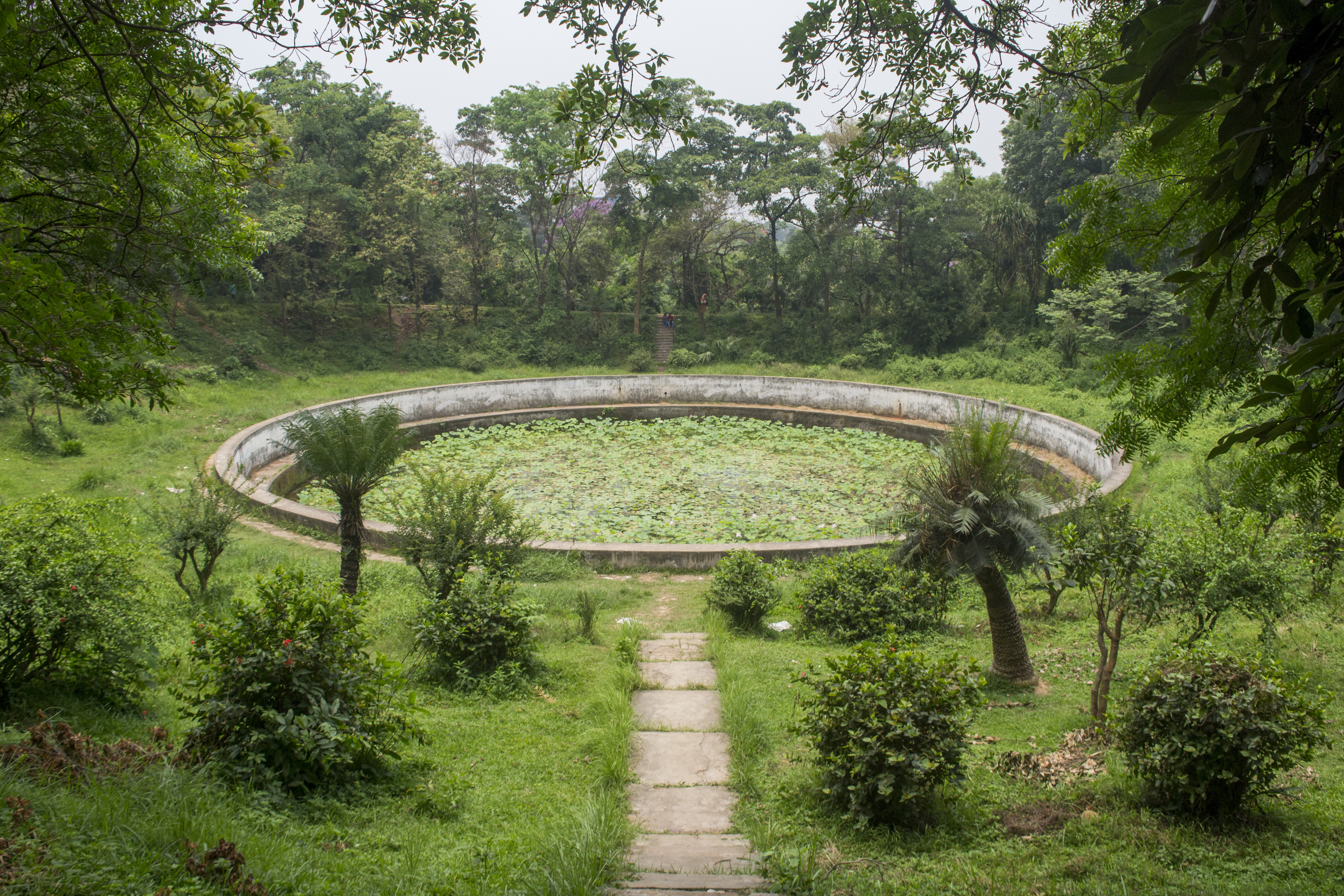
Pool for Victoria amazonica

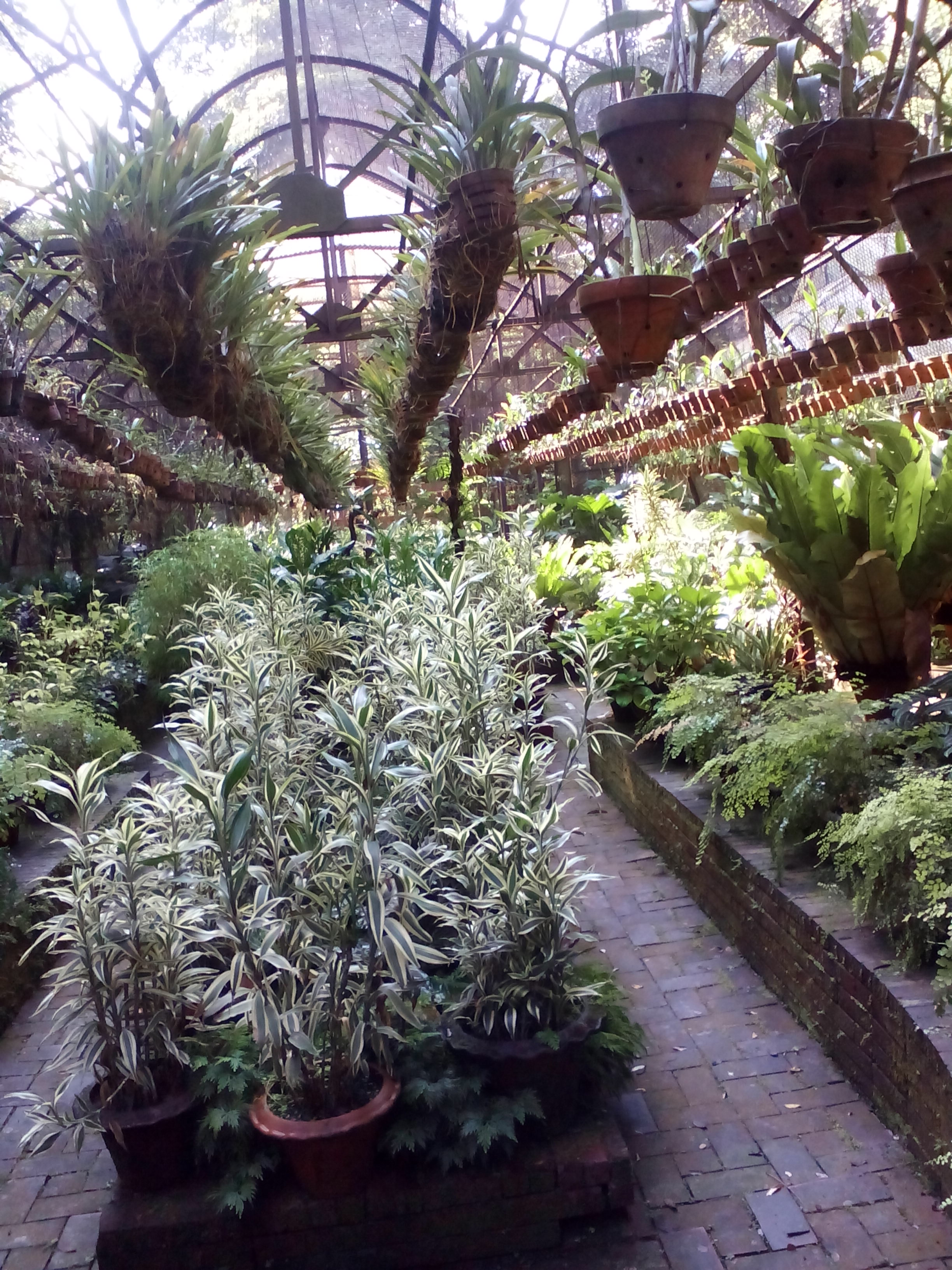
The orchid house in the garden

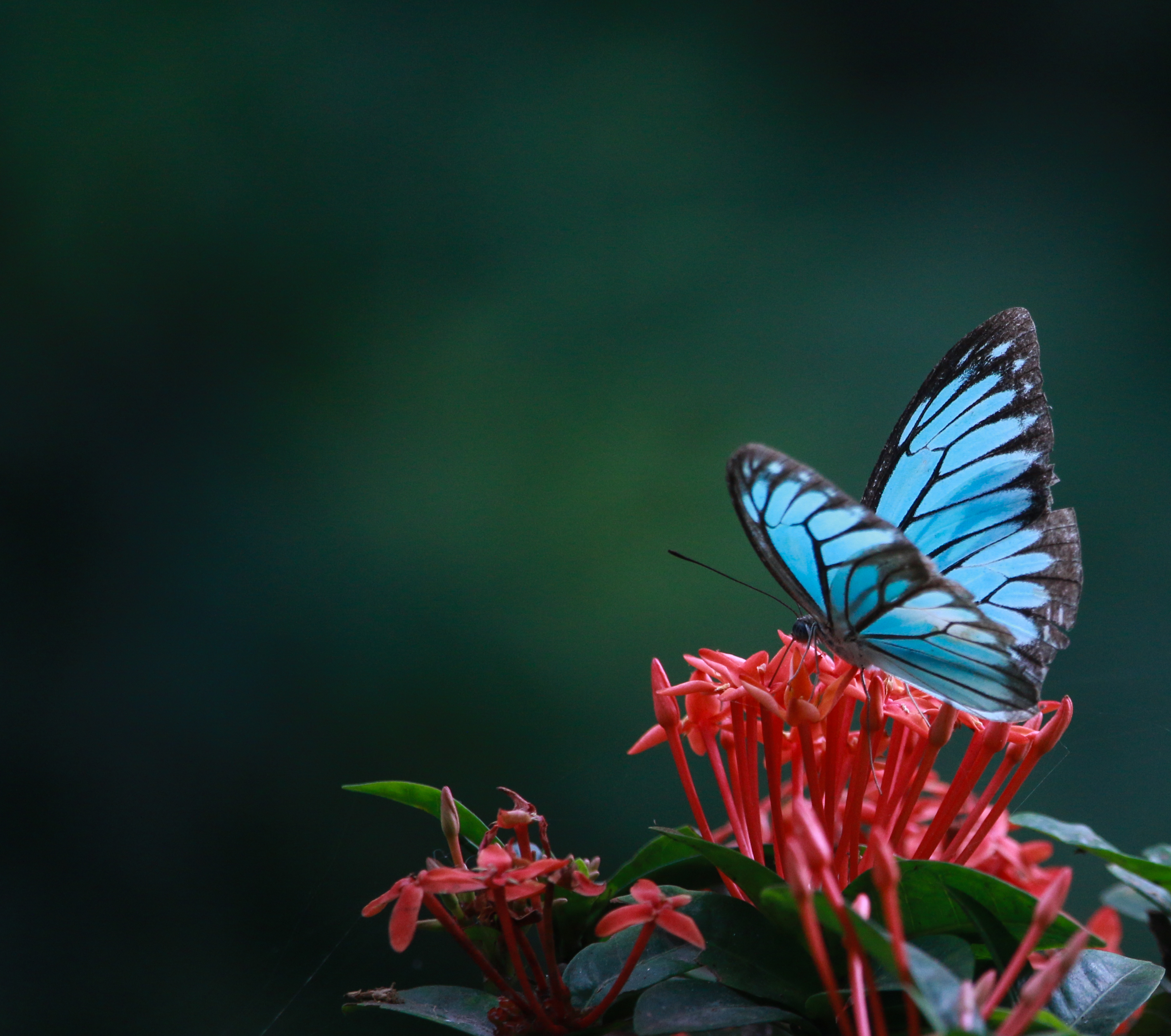
Butterfly at Botanic Garden

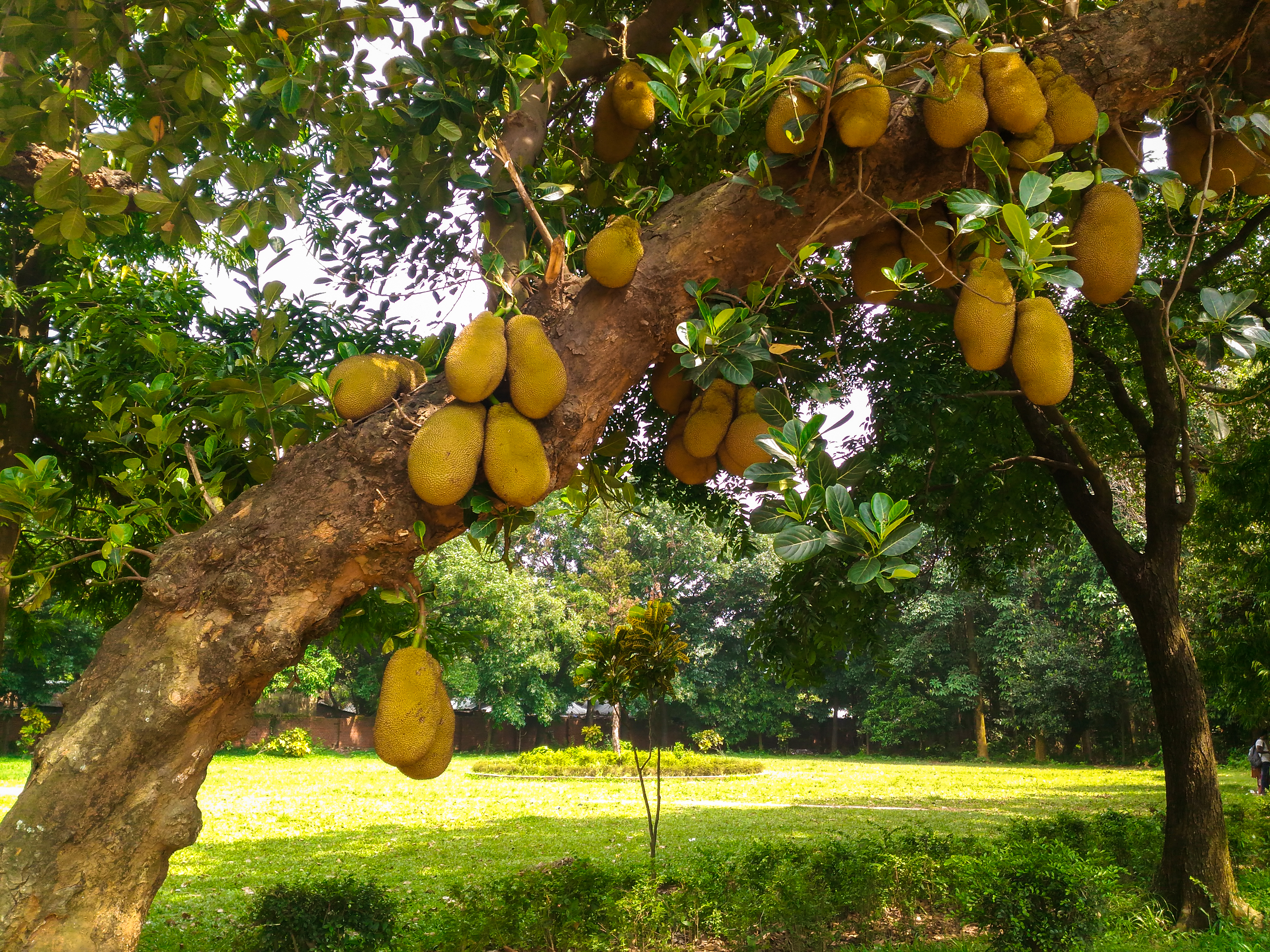
Jackfruit

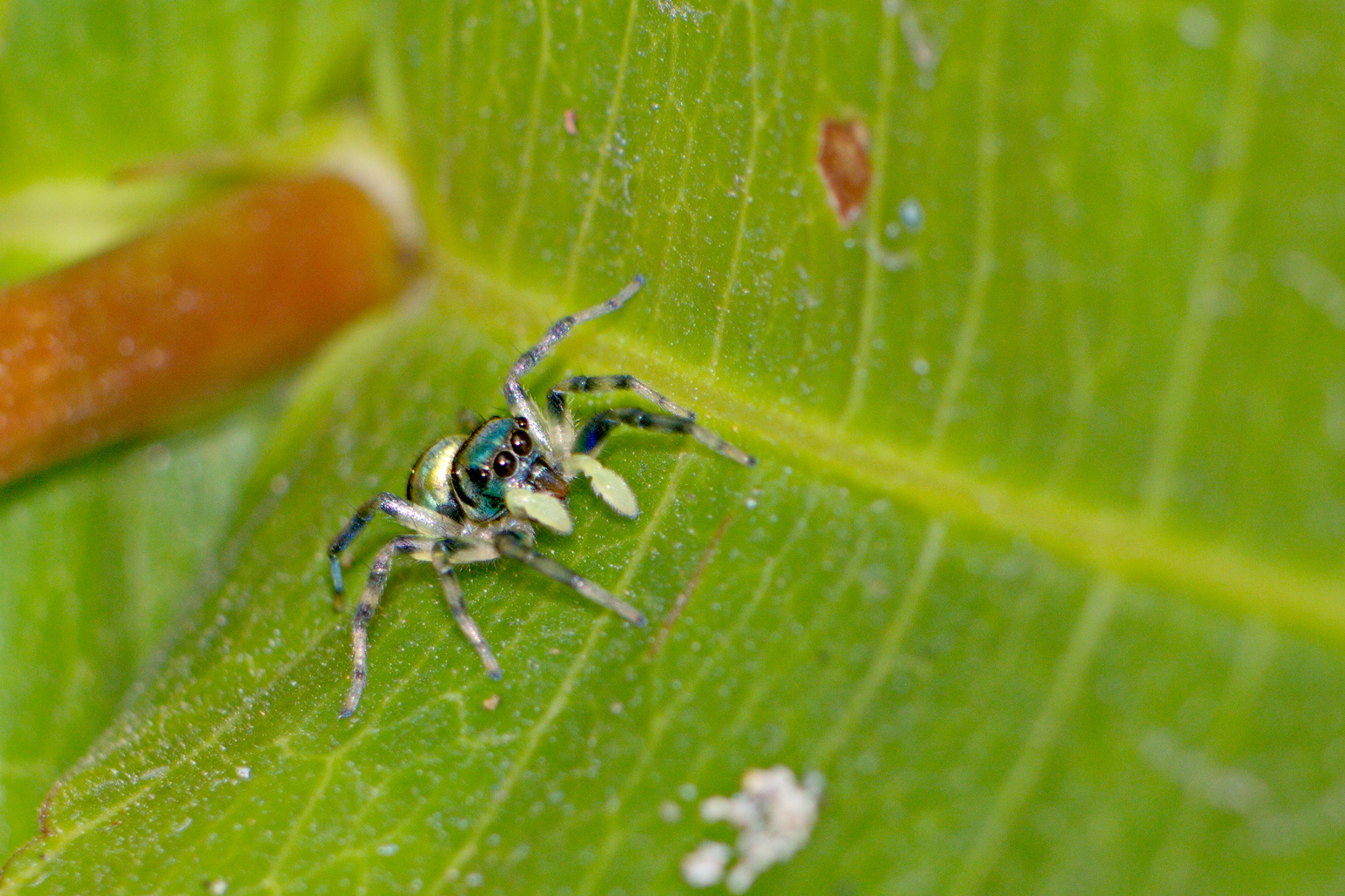
Spider

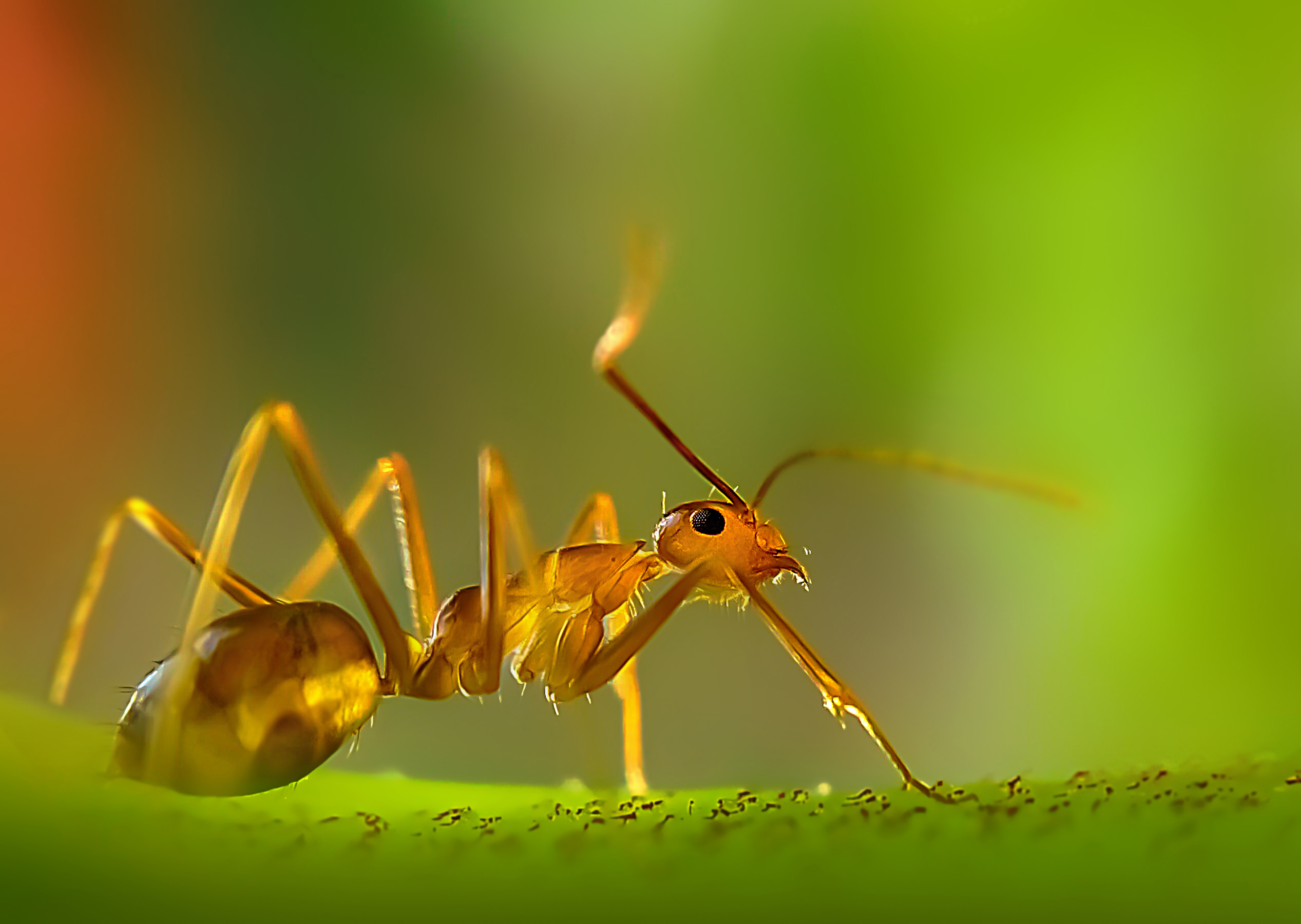
Ant

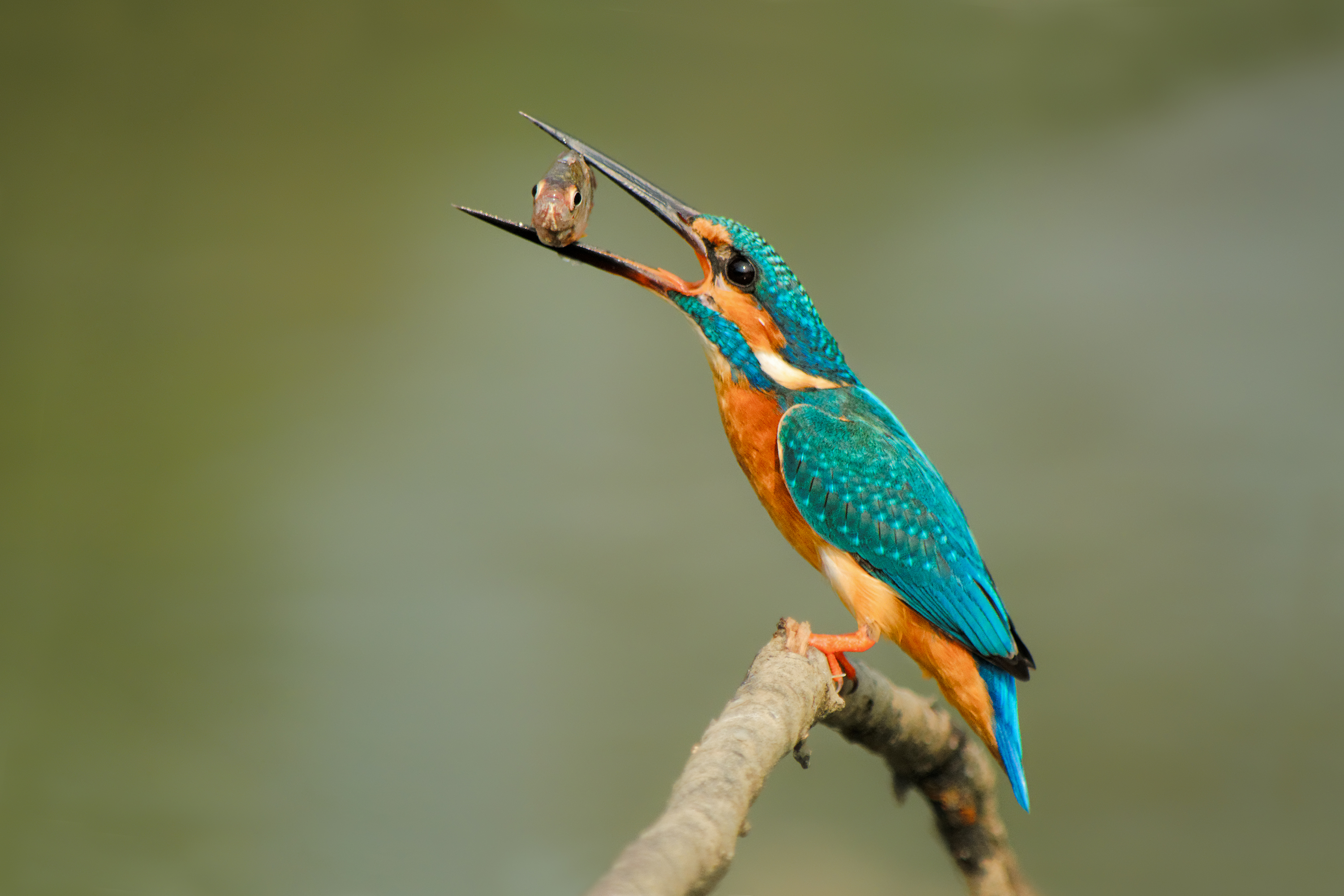
Kingfisher with catch

National Garden's Flower Tree
