= Bangladesh Forest Industries Development Corporation =

Government body of Bangladesh

- Formation: 1972
- Headquarters: Dhaka, Bangladesh
- Region served: Bangladesh
- Official language: Bengali
- Website: bfidc.gov.bd

Bangladesh Forest Industries Development Corporation or BFIDC, is an autonomous government body that manages the commercial exploitation of forests in Bangladesh, produce timber and wood products and manage plantations and is located in Motijheel Thana, Dhaka, Bangladesh.

== History ==
The corporation traces its origin to East Pakistan Forest Industries Development Corporation which was formed on 1959 and was changed to Bangladesh Forest Industries Development Corporation established on 1972 through a presidential ordinance. In 2016, it started manufacturing and selling furniture made from wood from rubber trees. It grows and rubber plantations in Bangladesh.
