= List of health and environmental agencies in the United States =

This article lists subnational environmental agencies in the United States, by state. Agencies that are responsible for state-level regulating, monitoring, managing, and protecting environmental and public health concerns. The exact duties of these agencies can vary widely and some are combined with or are part of a state's fish and wildlife management agency.

Agencies created as a result of interstate environmental compacts also are included, at the bottom of the list.

== Alabama ==
- Alabama Department of Conservation and Natural Resources
- Alabama Department of Environmental Management
- Alabama Department of Public Health

== Alaska ==
- Alaska Department of Natural Resources
- Alaska Department of Environmental Conservation
- Alaska Department of Health and Social Services

== Arizona ==
- Arizona Department of Environmental Quality
- Arizona Game and Fish Department
- Arizona Department of Health Services

== Arkansas ==
- Arkansas Department of Environmental Quality
- Arkansas Department of Health

== California ==
- California Environmental Protection Agency
  - California Department of Pesticide Regulation
  - California Department of Toxic Substances Control
  - California Air Resources Board
  - California Department of Resources Recycling and Recovery
- California Natural Resources Agency
  - California Department of Conservation
  - California Department of Fish and Game
  - California Department of Forestry and Fire Protection
  - California Department of Parks and Recreation
  - California Department of Water Resources
- California Department of Health Care Services

== Colorado ==
- Colorado Department of Natural Resources
- Colorado Department of Public Health and Environment

== Connecticut ==
- Connecticut Department of Energy and Environmental Protection
- Connecticut Department of Public Health

== Delaware ==
- Delaware Department of Health and Social Services
- Delaware Department of Natural Resources and Environmental Control
- Delaware Solid Waste Authority

== District of Columbia ==
- Department of Energy and Environment

== Florida ==
- Florida Department of Environmental Protection
- Florida Department of Health
- Florida Fish and Wildlife Conservation Commission
- Northwest Florida Water Management District
- Suwannee River Water Management District
- St. Johns River Water Management District
- Southwest Florida Water Management District
- South Florida Water Management District

== Georgia ==
- Georgia Department of Natural Resources
- Georgia Department of Public Health

== Hawaii ==
- Hawaii Department of Land and Natural Resources
- Hawaii Department of Health

== Idaho ==
- Idaho Department of Environmental Quality
- Idaho Department of Health and Welfare
- Idaho Department of Water Resources

== Illinois ==
- Illinois Department of Natural Resources
- Illinois Department of Public Health
- Illinois Environmental Protection Agency
- Illinois Pollution Control Board

== Indiana ==
- Indiana Department of Environmental Management
- Indiana Department of Natural Resources
- Indiana Department of Health

== Iowa ==
- Iowa Department of Natural Resources
- Iowa Department of Health

== Kansas ==
- Kansas Department of Agriculture, Division of Water Resources
- Kansas Department of Health and Environment, Division of Environment

== Kentucky ==
- Kentucky Department for Public Health
- Kentucky Energy and Environment Cabinet
  - Natural Resources Division

== Louisiana ==
- Louisiana Department of Environmental Quality
- Louisiana Department of Health
- Louisiana Department of Natural Resources

== Maine ==
- Maine Department of Agriculture, Conservation and Forestry
- Maine Department of Environmental Protection
- Maine Department of Health and Human Services
- Maine Department of Inland Fisheries and Wildlife
- Maine Department of Marine Resources

== Maryland ==
- Maryland Department of the Environment
- Maryland Department of Health
- Maryland Department of Natural Resources

== Massachusetts ==
- Massachusetts Executive Office of Energy and Environmental Affairs (EOEEA)
  - Coastal Zone Management
  - Water Resources Commission
  - Massachusetts Environmental Police
  - Office of Grants and Technical Assistance
    - Division of Conservation Services
    - Massachusetts Environmental Trust
    - Office of Technical Assistance and Technology
  - Natural Resource Damages Assessment and Restoration
- Massachusetts Department of Agricultural Resources
  - Division of Agricultural Conservation and Tech Assistance
  - Division of Agricultural Markets
  - Division of Animal Health
  - Division of Crop and Pest Services
- Massachusetts Department of Conservation and Recreation
  - Division of State Parks (MassParks)
  - Division of Water Supply Protection
- Massachusetts Department of Energy Resources
- Massachusetts Department of Environmental Protection
- Massachusetts Department of Fish and Game
  - Division of Fisheries and Wildlife (MassWildlife)
  - Division of Marine Fisheries
  - Division of Ecological Restoration
  - Office of Fishing and Boating Access
- Massachusetts Department of Public Health

== Michigan ==
- Michigan Department of Environment, Great Lakes, and Energy
- Michigan Department of Natural Resources

== Minnesota ==
- Minnesota Department of Health
- Minnesota Department of Natural Resources
- Minnesota Environmental Quality Board
- Minnesota Pollution Control Agency
- University of Minnesota Extension Service

== Mississippi ==
- Mississippi Department of Environmental Quality
- Mississippi Department of Health

== Missouri ==
- Missouri Department of Conservation
- Missouri Department of Health
- Missouri Department of Natural Resources

== Montana ==
- Montana Department of Environmental Quality
- Montana Department of Natural Resources and Conservation
- Montana Department of Public Health and Human Services

== Nebraska ==
- Nebraska Department of Environment and Energy
- Nebraska Department of Health and Human Services
- Nebraska Department of Natural Resources

== Nevada ==
- Nevada Department of Conservation and Natural Resources
  - Nevada Division of Environmental Protection
  - Nevada Division of Forestry
  - Nevada Division of Water Resources
- Nevada Department of Health and Human Services

== New Hampshire ==
- New Hampshire Department of Environmental Services
  - New Hampshire Geological Survey
  - New Hampshire Pollution Prevention Program
  - New Hampshire Water Council
  - New Hampshire Wetlands Council
- New Hampshire Department of Health and Human Services
- New Hampshire Fish and Game Department
- New Hampshire Department of Natural and Cultural Resources
  - New Hampshire Division of Forests and Lands

== New Jersey ==
- New Jersey Department of Environmental Protection
- New Jersey Department of Health

== New Mexico ==
- New Mexico Department of Energy, Minerals, and Natural Resources
- New Mexico Department of Health
- New Mexico Environment Department

== New York ==
- Adirondack Park Agency
- Hudson River Valley Greenway
- New York City Department of Environmental Protection
- New York State Department of Agriculture and Markets
- New York State Department of Environmental Conservation
- New York Department of Health
- New York State Energy Research and Development Authority
- New York State Environmental Facilities Corporation
- New York State Office of Parks, Recreation and Historic Preservation

== North Carolina ==
- North Carolina Department of Environmental Quality
  - Division of Pollution Prevention and Environmental Assistance

== North Dakota ==
- North Dakota Department of Environmental Quality
- North Dakota Department of Water Resources
- North Dakota Geological Survey
- North Dakota Department of Health

== Ohio ==
- Ohio Department of Natural Resources
- Ohio Department of Health
- Ohio Environmental Protection Agency
- Ohio Air Quality Development Authority

== Oklahoma ==
- Oklahoma Conservation Commission
- Oklahoma Department of Environmental Quality
- Oklahoma Department of Health

== Oregon ==
- Oregon Department of Environmental Quality
- Oregon Department of Forestry
- Oregon Department of Fish and Wildlife
- Oregon Department of Water Resources
- Oregon Health Authority
- Oregon Watershed Enhancement Board

== Pennsylvania ==
- Pennsylvania Department of Conservation and Natural Resources
- Pennsylvania Department of Environmental Protection
- Pennsylvania Department of Health

== Rhode Island ==
- Rhode Island Department of Environmental Management
- Rhode Island Department of Health

== South Carolina ==
- South Carolina Department of Health and Environmental Control
- South Carolina Department of Natural Resources
- South Carolina Department of Public Health
- South Carolina Department of Environmental Services

== South Dakota ==
- South Dakota Department of Agriculture and Natural Resources
- South Dakota Department of Health

== Tennessee ==
- Tennessee Department of Environment and Conservation
- Tennessee Department of Health
- Tennessee Wildlife Resources Agency
- Tennessee Department of Agriculture

== Texas ==
- Texas Commission on Environmental Quality
- Texas Department of Health
- Texas Parks and Wildlife Department

== Utah ==
- Utah Department of Environmental Quality
- Utah Department of Health and Human Services
- Utah Department of Natural Resources
  - Utah Department of Natural Resources Division of Forestry, Fire and State Lands
  - Utah Office of Energy Development
  - Utah Public Lands
  - Utah Division of Wildlife Resources

== Vermont ==
- Vermont Agency of Natural Resources
  - Vermont Department of Environmental Conservation
  - Vermont Department of Fish and Wildlife
  - Vermont Department of Forests, Parks and Recreation
- Vermont Department of Health

== Virginia ==
- Virginia Department of Agriculture and Consumer Services
- Virginia Department of Conservation and Recreation
- Virginia Department of Environmental Quality
- Virginia Department of Forestry
- Virginia Department of Health
- Virginia Department of Wildlife Resources

== Washington (state) ==
- Washington State Department of Ecology
- Washington State Department of Health
- Washington State Department of Natural Resources

== West Virginia ==
- West Virginia Department of Environmental Protection
- West Virginia Department of Health and Human Services
- West Virginia Division of Forestry
- West Virginia Division of Natural Resources

== Wisconsin ==
- Wisconsin Department of Natural Resources
- Wisconsin Department of Health Services

== Wyoming ==
- Wyoming Department of Environmental Quality
- Wyoming Department of Health

== Interstate agencies ==
- Atlantic States Marine Fisheries Commission
- Great Lakes Commission
- Interstate Commission on the Potomac River Basin
- Northwest Power and Conservation Council
- Red River Compact Commission
- Susquehanna River Basin Commission
- Tahoe Regional Planning Agency
- Yellowstone River Compact Commission

== See also ==
US Federal environmental agencies

- Council on Environmental Quality
- Department of Agriculture, including the USFS
- Department of Defense
- Department of Energy
- Department of the Interior, including the BLM, Fish and Wildlife Service, National Park Service, USGS
- US Environmental Protection Agency
- National Oceanic and Atmospheric Administration
- National Drought Policy Commission (defunct)

US Territories

- Puerto Rico Department of Natural and Environmental Resources
- Puerto Rico Department of Health
- Guam Environmental Protection Agency

Other

- List of environmental ministries
- List of state and territorial fish and wildlife management agencies in the United States
