= Linda Bell (epidemiologist) =

American epidemiologist

Linda J. Bell is an American physician who is South Carolina's State epidemiologist, Health Programs Branch Director at the South Carolina Department of Public Health and a member of The Council of State and Territorial Epidemiologists (CSTE) organization.

== Early life and education ==
Linda J. Bell is from El Paso, Texas. Her parents, Wesley and Gladys Wilson, encouraged Bell in her pursuit of science. In 1978, Bell enrolled at the University of Texas at Austin and majored in molecular biology.

In 1982, Bell received a Bachelor of Science degree in molecular biology at the University of Texas. Before going to medical school, Bell worked at a university lab conducting research on muscle cell development and muscular dystrophy. During this time, Bell shifted her focus to internal medicine and the study of infectious diseases.

In 1989, Bell obtained her medical degree at the University of Texas Southwestern Medical Center with a specialty in internal medicine. Bell was one of five African Americans in her class and remained the only African American in the internal medicine residency program.

== Career ==
Bell earned a position at the Centers for Disease Control and Prevention's (CDC) as an officer of the Epidemic Intelligence Service (EIS) program.

Bell's experience as an epidemic intelligence service officer influenced her decision to change career paths from infectious diseases to public health after finishing the program at South Carolina Department of Health and Environmental Control (DHEC) in 1993. Bell joined the (DHEC) in 1994. Bell has held additional positions with DHEC including Director of Divisions of Acute Disease Epidemiology, Director of Bureau of Communicable Disease Prevention and Control, and Director of Clinical Services. Bell provided oversight as a Director, for the Divisions of Acute Diseases, specifically, programs involving infectious diseases, immunizations, Tuberculosis, and STD/HIV.

In 2013, Bell became South Carolina's State Epidemiologist. Since 2016, Bell has been at the South Carolina Department of Health and Environment Control (DHEC). During the COVID-19 pandemic in 2019, she provided science-based education and shed light on health disparities that contributed to the impact of the pandemic on African Americans.

On July 1, 2024, DHEC became two separate agencies in accordance with the DHEC Restructuring Act of 2023. The South Carolina Department of Environmental Services (SCDES) and South Carolina Department of Public Health (DPH). Bell is the Health Programs Branch Director at the South Carolina Department of Public Health.

Bell retired after over 30 years at DHEC and CDC.

== Honors ==
Bell has been recognized by the National Association for the Advancement of Colored People (NAACP) for her leadership and strategies to improve public health as well as being recognized by the Urban League and the South Carolina Public Health Association.
