= Public health laboratory =

Governmental public health reference laboratory

Public health laboratories (PHLs) or National Public Health Laboratories (NPHL) are governmental reference laboratories that protect the public against diseases and other health hazards. The 2005 International Health Regulations came into force in June 2007, with 196 binding countries that recognised that certain public health incidents, extending beyond disease, ought to be designated as a Public Health Emergency of International Concern (PHEIC), as they pose a significant global threat. The PHLs serve as national hazard detection centres, and forward these concerns to the World Health Organization.

== International accreditation ==
In 2007, Haim Hacham et al. published a paper addressing the need for and the process of international standardised accreditation for laboratory proficiency in Israel. With similar efforts, both the Japan Accreditation Board for Conformity Assessment (JAB) and the European Communities Confederation of Clinical Chemistry and Laboratory Medicine (EC4) have validated and convened ISO 15189 Medical laboratories — Requirements for quality and competence, respectively.

In 2006, Spitzenberger and Edelhäuser expressed concerns that ISO accreditation may include obstacles arising from new emerging medical devices and the new approach of assessment; in so doing, they indicate the time dependence of standards.

== Africa ==
- WHO-Afro HIV/AIDS Laboratory Network
- East African Laboratory Network
- African Society for Laboratory Medicine
- National Public Health Laboratory (Sudan)

== Canada ==
- Canadian Public Health Laboratory Network

== Europe ==
- European Union Reference Laboratories cf. Commission Regulation (EC) No 776/2006 and Commission Regulation (EC) No 882/2004
- EpiSouth Network

== United Kingdom ==
The Public Health Laboratory Service (PHLS) was established as part of the National Health Service in 1946. An Emergency Public Health Laboratory Service was established in 1940 as a response to the threat of bacteriological warfare. There was originally a central laboratory at Colindale and a network of regional and local laboratories. By 1955 there were about 1000 staff. These laboratories were primarily preventive with an epidemiological focus. They were, however, in some places located with hospital laboratories which had a diagnostic focus.

The PHLS was replaced by the Health Protection Agency in 2003; the HPA was disbanded and in its stead was constituted Public Health England, which later became the UK Health Security Agency in 2021.

== United States ==
United States laboratory networks and organizations

- Association of Public Health Laboratories
- Laboratory Response Network (CDC)
- PulseNet (CDC)
- Integrated Consortium of Laboratory Networks
- Food Emergency Response Network
- Environmental Laboratory Response Network
- Council to Improve Foodborne Outbreak Response

=== US State Public Health Laboratories ===
State Public Health Laboratories in the United States
Public Health Laboratory	State
Alabama Bureau of Clinical Laboratories	Alabama
Alaska Division of Public Health Laboratory	Alaska
American Samoa Health Department Laboratory	American Samoa
Arizona Bureau of State Laboratory Services	Arizona
Arkansas Public Health Laboratory	Arkansas
California Department of Public Health Laboratory	California
Colorado Department of Public Health & Environment	Colorado
Commonwealth Healthcare Corporation	Northern Mariana Islands
Delaware Public Health Laboratory	Delaware
District of Columbia Public Health Laboratory	District of Columbia
Dr. Katherine A. Kelley Public Health Laboratory	Connecticut
Florida Bureau of Public Health Laboratories	Florida
Georgia Public Health Laboratory	Georgia
Guam Public Health Laboratory	Guam
Hawaii State Laboratories Division	Hawaii
Idaho Bureau of Laboratories	Idaho
Illinois Department of Public Health Laboratory	Illinois
Indiana Public Health Laboratory	Indiana
Kansas Health & Environmental Laboratories	Kansas
Kentucky Division of Laboratory Service	Kentucky
Louisiana Public Health Laboratory	Louisiana
Maine State Health & Environmental Testing Laboratory	Maine
Maryland Laboratories Administration	Maryland
Massachusetts State Public Health Laboratory	Massachusetts
Michigan Public Health Laboratory	Michigan
Minnesota Public Health Laboratory Division	Minnesota
Mississippi Public Health Laboratory	Mississippi
Missouri State Public Health Laboratory	Missouri
Montana Laboratory Services Bureau	Montana
Nebraska Public Health Laboratory	Nebraska
Nevada State Public Health Laboratory	Nevada
New Hampshire Public Health Laboratories	New Hampshire
New Jersey Division of Public Health & Environmental Laboratories	New Jersey
New Mexico Department of Health	New Mexico
North Carolina State Laboratory of Public Health	North Carolina
North Dakota Division of Laboratory Services	North Dakota
Ohio Department of Health Laboratories	Ohio
Oklahoma Public Health Laboratory	Oklahoma
Oregon State Public Health Laboratory	Oregon
Pennsylvania State Public Health Laboratory	Pennsylvania
Puerto Rico Public Health Laboratory	Puerto Rico
Rhode Island State Health Laboratory	Rhode Island
South Carolina Bureau of Laboratories	South Carolina
South Dakota Public Health Laboratory	South Dakota
State Hygienic Laboratory at the University of Iowa	Iowa
Tennessee Department of Health Laboratory Services	Tennessee
Texas Department of State Health Services	Texas
Unified Utah State Laboratories: Public Health	Utah
United States Virgin Islands Department of Health	U.S. Virgin Islands
Vermont Department of Health Laboratory	Vermont
Virginia Division of Consolidated Laboratory Services	Virginia
Wadsworth Center	New York
Washington Public Health Laboratories	Washington
West Virginia Department of Health & Human Services	West Virginia
Wisconsin State Laboratory of Hygiene	Wisconsin
Wyoming Public Health Laboratory	Wyoming

=== US City and County Public Health Laboratories ===
City and County Public Health Laboratories in the United States
Public Health Laboratory	State
Alameda County Public Health Laboratory	CA
Allegheny County Health Department Public Health Laboratory	PA
Brazos County Health District	TX
Butte County Public Health Laboratory	CA
Chicago Department of Public Health Laboratory	IL
City of Laredo Public Health Laboratory	TX
Contra Costa Regional Public Health Laboratory	CA
Corpus Christi - Nueces County Health Department Lab	TX
Dallas County Health and Human Services	TX
Denver Public Health Laboratory	CO
Eau Claire City-County Health Department	WI
El Paso City Department of Health Laboratory	TX
El Paso County Department of Health and Environment	CO
Erie County Public Health Laboratory	NY
Fairfax County Health Department Laboratory	VA
Fresno County Public Health Laboratory	CA
Genesee and Orleans County Health Department Laboratory	NY
Houston Public Health Laboratory	TX
Humboldt County Public Health Laboratory	CA
Kalamazoo County Health and Community Services, Public Health Laboratory	MI
Kern County Department of Public Health Laboratory	CA
Kings County Public Health Laboratory	CA
Lane County Department of Health and Human Services	OR
Laredo City Health Department	TX
LMAS Regional Laboratory	KY
Long Beach Public Health Laboratory	CA
Los Angeles County Public Health Laboratory	CA
Los Angeles County Public Health Laboratory	CA
Louisville Metro Health Department Laboratory	KY
Madera County Department of Public Health Laboratory	CA
Marion County Health Department Public Health Laboratory	IN
Merced County Public Health Laboratory	CA
Milwaukee City Health Department Bureau of Laboratories	WI
Monterey County Health Department Laboratory	CA
Napa-Solano-Yolo-Marin-Mendocino County Public Health Laboratory	CA
New York City Department of Health and Mental Hygiene Bureau of Laboratories	NY
Orange County Public Health Laboratory	CA
Philadelphia Public Health Laboratories	PA
Public Health Laboratory of East Texas	TX
Public Health Laboratory of Northwest Michigan	MI
Riverside University Health System Public Health Laboratory	CA
Sacramento County Public Health Laboratory	CA
Saginaw County Department of Public Health Laboratory	MI
San Antonio Metro Health District Laboratory	TX
San Bernardino County Public Health Laboratory	CA
San Diego County Public Health Laboratory	CA
San Francisco Public Health Laboratory	CA
San Joaquin Public Health Services, Public Health Laboratory	CA
San Jose - Santa Clara Regional Wastewater Facility Laboratory	CA
San Luis Obispo County Public Health Department	CA
San Mateo County Public Health Department	CA
Santa Barbara County Public Health Laboratory	CA
Santa Clara County Public Health Laboratory	CA
Santa Cruz Public Health Laboratory	CA
Seattle - King County Public Health Laboratory	WA
Sonoma County Public Health Laboratory	CA
Southern Nevada Public Health Laboratory	NV
St. Louis County Environmental Health Laboratory	MO
Tarrant County Public Health Laboratory	TX
Texas Tech University Bioterrorism Response Laboratory	TX
Tulare County Public Health Laboratory	CA
Ventura County Public Health Laboratory	CA
Western Upper Peninsula Health Department	MI

=== US State Environmental and Agriculture Laboratories ===
US Environmental and Agriculture Laboratories
Laboratory	State
Alaska Environmental Health Laboratory	Alaska
California Department of Toxic Substances Control	California
Colorado Department of Agriculture Laboratory	Colorado
Florida Bureau of Food Laboratories	Florida
Kansas Department of Agriculture, Division of Laboratories	Kansas
Kansas State Veterinary Diagnostic Laboratory	Kansas
Massachusetts Department of Environmental Protection	Massachusetts
Minnesota Department of Agriculture Laboratory	Minnesota
Mississippi State Chemical Laboratory	Mississippi
Nebraska Public Health Environmental Laboratory	Nebraska
New York State Department of Agriculture & Markets	New York
North Carolina Department of Agriculture	North Carolina
Ohio EPA - Division of Environmental Services	Ohio
Oklahoma Department of Environmental Quality	Oklahoma
Oregon Department of Agriculture, Laboratory Services	Oregon
Oregon Department of Environmental Quality Laboratory	Oregon
Pennsylvania Department of Agriculture - Bureau of Food Safety and Laboratory Services - Laboratory Division	Pennsylvania
Pennsylvania Department of Environmental Protection, Bureau of Laboratories	Pennsylvania
Washington State Department of Agriculture Microbiology Laboratory	Washington
West Virginia Department of Agriculture	West Virginia
Wyoming Department of Agriculture, Analytical Services	Wyoming

== Other international laboratory networks ==
- WHO Global Influenza Surveillance and Response System
- WHO H5 Reference Laboratories
- WHO Emerging and Dangerous Pathogens Laboratory Network

== See also ==
- Association of Public Health Laboratories
- ISO 9000
- ISO 15189
- ISO/IEC 17025
