= State health agency =

American state-level government agency

A state health agency (SHA), or state department of health, is a department or agency of the state governments of the United States focused on public health. The state secretary of health is a constitutional or at times a statutory official in several states of the United States. The position is the chief executive official for the state's state health agency (or equivalent), chief administrative officer for the state's Board of Health (or equivalent), or both.

Following passage of the Safe Drinking Water Act of 1974, during the first ten years of the program the state health departments were given new and important roles under the law. Due to new grants available, they had enhanced their programs and had many more resources to oversee and help utilities come into compliance with drinking water standards, and they were able to develop other related activities like the capacity for doing risk assessments on new contaminants of concern.

== Terminology ==
Although the vast majority of these agencies are officially called "departments," the Association of State and Territorial Health Officials adopted "state health agency" as the generic term to reflect the fact that a substantial number of these agencies are no longer state "departments" in the traditional sense of a cabinet-level organizational unit dedicated exclusively to public health. During the 1950s, 1960s, and 1970s, at least 20 states and the District of Columbia merged these departments with other government agencies that provide social services, welfare, or other types of unrelated services. The result is that in those jurisdictions, the state government agency that actually provides public health services is but one of several units inside a large cabinet-level agency.

== Responsibilities ==
State health departments have different names and responsibilities; in some states they are top-level administrative agencies, while in other states they are a division or bureau of another office. Health departments are usually responsible for public health, including preventive medicine, epidemiology, vaccinations, environmental health (sometimes including health inspections), and the licensing of health care professionals; the collection and archiving of vital records such as birth and death certificates and sometimes marriage and divorce certificates; health statistics; developmental disabilities; mental health; occupational safety and health; receiving and recording reports of notifiable diseases; and tobacco control.

In some states, state health departments may additionally be responsible for social services and welfare, environmental protection/pollution control, or the operation of the state psychiatric hospital. Some states have a Surgeon General.

== State health agencies (SHAs) ==
The following are state health agencies as identified by the Centers for Disease Control and Prevention:

State	SHA	Health Officer’s position	Health Officer’s name	Website
Alabama	Alabama Department of Public Health	State Health Officer	Scott Harris	http://alabamapublichealth.gov
Alaska	Alaska Department of Health	Commissioner	Heidi Hedberg	https://health.alaska.gov
Arizona	Arizona Department of Health Services	Cabinet Executive Officer	Jennifer Cunico	https://www.azdhs.gov
Arkansas	Arkansas Department of Health	Secretary of Health	Renee Mallory	https://healthy.arkansas.gov
Arkansas	Arkansas Department of Health	Director, State Health Officer Designee	Jennifer Dillaha	https://healthy.arkansas.gov
California	California Department of Public Health	Director, State Public Health Officer	Tomás Aragón	https://www.cdph.ca.gov
Colorado	Colorado Department of Public Health and Environment	Executive Director	Jill Hunsaker Ryan	
Connecticut	Connecticut State Department of Public Health	Commissioner	Manisha Juthani	https://portal.ct.gov/dph
Delaware	Delaware Division of Public Health (Delaware Department of Health and Social Services)	Commissioner	Steven L. Blessing	https://dhss.delaware.gov/dph/
District of Columbia	District of Columbia Department of Health	Director	Ayanna Bennett	https://dchealth.dc.gov/
Florida	Florida Department of Health	Secretary and Surgeon General	Joseph Ladapo	http://www.floridahealth.gov
Georgia	Georgia Department of Public Health	Commissioner and State Health Officer	Kathleen Toomey	https://dph.georgia.gov
Hawaii	Hawaii State Department of Health	Director	Kenneth Fink	https://health.hawaii.gov
Idaho	Division of Public Health (Idaho Department of Health and Welfare)	Public Health Administrator	Elke Shaw-Tulloch	https://healthandwelfare.idaho.gov
Illinois	Illinois Department of Public Health	Director of Public Health	Sameer Vohra	http://www.dph.illinois.gov
Indiana	Indiana Department of Health	State Health Commissioner	Lindsay Weaver	https://www.in.gov/health/
Iowa	Iowa Department of Health and Human Services	Director	Kelly Garcia	https://hhs.iowa.gov/
Iowa	Iowa Department of Health and Human Services	State Medical Director, State Health Officer Designee	Robert Kruse	https://hhs.iowa.gov/
Kansas	Kansas Department of Health and Environment	Secretary	Janet Stanek	https://www.kdhe.ks.gov/
Kentucky	Kentucky Department for Public Health (Kentucky Cabinet for Health and Family Services)	Commissioner	Steven J. Stack	https://www.chfs.ky.gov/agencies/dph/
Louisiana	Louisiana Office of Public Health (Louisiana Department of Health and Hospitals)	Surgeon General	Ralph L. Abraham	https://ldh.la.gov/
Louisiana	Louisiana Office of Public Health (Louisiana Department of Health and Hospitals)	Secretary	Michael Harrington	https://ldh.la.gov/
Maine	Maine Center for Disease Control & Prevention (Maine Department of Health and Human Services)	Director	Puthiery Va	https://www.maine.gov/dhhs/mecdc/
Maryland	Maryland Department of Health	Secretary of Health	Laura Herrera Scott	https://health.maryland.gov
Maryland	Maryland Department of Health	Deputy Secretary, State Health Officer Designee	Nilesh Kalyanaraman	https://health.maryland.gov
Massachusetts	Massachusetts Department of Public Health	Commissioner	Robert Goldstein	https://www.mass.gov/orgs/department-of-public-health
Michigan	Michigan Department of Health and Human Services	Director	Elizabeth Hertel	https://www.michigan.gov/mdhhs
Michigan	Michigan Department of Health and Human Services	Chief Medical Executive, State Health Officer Designee	Natasha Bagdasarian	https://www.michigan.gov/mdhhs
Minnesota	Minnesota Department of Health	Health Commissioner	Brooke Cunningham	https://www.health.state.mn.us/
Mississippi	Mississippi State Department of Health	State Health Officer	Daniel Edney	https://msdh.ms.gov
Missouri	Missouri Department of Health and Senior Services	Director	Paula Nickelson	https://health.mo.gov
Montana	Montana Department of Public Health and Human Services	State Medical Director	Douglas Harrington	https://dphhs.mt.gov
Nebraska	Division of Public Health (Nebraska Department of Health & Human Services)	Chief Executive Officer	Steve Corsi	http://www.dhhs.ne.gov
Nebraska	Division of Public Health (Nebraska Department of Health & Human Services)	Director, Division of Public Health, State Health Officer Designee	Charity Menefee	http://www.dhhs.ne.gov
Nevada	Nevada Division of Public & Behavioural Health (Nevada Department of Health and Human Services)	Administrator	Cody Phinney	http://dhhs.nv.gov
Nevada	Nevada Division of Public & Behavioural Health (Nevada Department of Health and Human Services)	Chief Medical Officer, State Health Officer Designee	Ihsan Azzam	http://dhhs.nv.gov
New Hampshire	New Hampshire Department of Health & Human Services	Associate Commissioner	Patricia Tilley	https://www.dhhs.nh.gov
New Jersey	New Jersey Department of Health	Health Commissioner	Raynard Washington	https://www.nj.gov/health/
New Mexico	New Mexico Department of Health	Interim Cabinet Secretary	Gina DeBlassie	https://nmhealth.org
New Mexico	New Mexico Department of Health	Chief Medical Officer, State Health Officer Designee	Miranda Durham	https://nmhealth.org
New York	New York State Department of Health	Commissioner of Health	James McDonald	https://www.health.ny.gov
North Carolina	North Carolina Division of Public Health (North Carolina Department of Health and Human Services)	Acting Director	Kelly Kimple	https://www.ncdhhs.gov/divisions/public-health
North Carolina	North Carolina Division of Public Health (North Carolina Department of Health and Human Services)	State Health Director, Chief Medical Officer, State Health Officer Designee	Elizabeth Cuervo Tilson	https://www.ncdhhs.gov/divisions/public-health
North Dakota	North Dakota Department of Health	State Health Officer	Nizar Wehbi	https://www.hhs.nd.gov/health
Ohio	Ohio Department of Health	Director of Health	Bruce Vanderhoff	https://www.odh.ohio.gov
Oklahoma	Oklahoma State Department of Health	Commissioner of Health	Keith Reed	https://oklahoma.gov/health
Oregon	Public Health Division, Oregon Health Authority	Director	Sejal Hathi	https://www.oregon.gov/oha/ph
Oregon	Public Health Division, Oregon Health Authority	Public Health Director, State Health Officer Designee	Naomi Adeline-Biggs	https://www.oregon.gov/oha/ph
Pennsylvania	Pennsylvania Department of Health	Secretary of Health	Debra Bogen	https://www.health.pa.gov
Rhode Island	Rhode Island Department of Health	Director	Jerome Larkin	https://health.ri.gov
South Carolina	South Carolina Department of Public Health	Interim Director	Edward Simmer	https://dph.sc.gov/
South Carolina	South Carolina Department of Public Health	Director of Public Health, State Health Officer Designee	Brannon Traxler	https://dph.sc.gov/
South Dakota	South Dakota Department of Health	Secretary of Health	Melissa Magstadt	https://doh.sd.gov
Tennessee	Tennessee Department of Health	Commissioner	Ralph Alvarado	https://www.tn.gov/health
Texas	Texas Department of State Health Services	Commissioner	Jennifer Shuford	https://www.dshs.state.tx.us
Utah	Utah Department of Health and Human Services	Executive Medical Director	Stacey Bank	https://dhhs.utah.gov/
Vermont	Vermont Department of Health	Commissioner of Health	Mark Levine	https://www.healthvermont.gov
Virginia	Virginia Department of Health	State Health Commissioner	Karen Shelton	http://www.vdh.virginia.gov
Washington	Washington State Department of Health	Secretary of Health	Dennis Worsham	https://www.doh.wa.gov
West Virginia	West Virginia Bureau for Public Health (West Virginia Department of Health and Human Resources)	State Health Officer	Matthew Christiansen	https://dhhr.wv.gov/bph/
Wisconsin	Wisconsin Department of Health Services	State Health Officer, Division of Public Health Administrator	Paula Tran	https://www.dhs.wisconsin.gov/dph/
Wyoming	Public Health Division (Wyoming Department of Health)	State Health Officer	Alexia Harrist	https://health.wyo.gov
Wyoming	Public Health Division (Wyoming Department of Health)	Senior Administrator, State Health Officer Designee	Stephanie Sandoval	https://health.wyo.gov

== See also ==
- Health departments in the United States
- State education agency
- Health care in the United States
- United States Department of Health and Human Services
- Centers for Disease Control and Prevention
