= International Food Protection Training Institute =

Initiative non-profit organization for a safer global food supply

The International Food Protection Training Institute is an initiative of the Global Food Protection Institute, a 501 (c) (3) non-profit organization driving the adoption of food-protection policies and practices for a safer global food supply. Its mission is to improve public health and reduce mortality, morbidity, and economic costs associated with foodborne illnesses.

In collaboration with the U.S. Food and Drug Administration (FDA), U.S. federal regulatory and public health officials, and academic institutions, The Training Institute delivers food protection courses to federal, state, local, tribal, and territorial food protection professionals. This training meets established U.S. federal food safety standards and all costs associated with the training are reimbursed.

State and local agencies carry out more than 90 percent of food safety inspections in U.S. food manufacturing and distribution establishments, yet less than $1 million was spent on training in 2009, which is inadequate to facilitate any significant increase in capacity or equivalency at the state and local levels. Many state and local offices no longer fund travel for training their food safety inspectors due to budgetary constraints. The Training Institute makes its programs free for U.S. regulatory officials, reimbursing training and travel costs. The food training organization provides a blueprint for career-spanning, standards-based training curriculum that could raise the standard of food training nationwide. In 2009, The Training Institute was established after government, academic, industry, and national food safety groups collaborated, prompted by the melamine incident in 2007. Most face-to-face training programs are delivered at The Radisson in Kalamazoo, MI or at the office in Portage, MI.

== Achievements ==
The Training Institute received the 2011 NSF International Food Safety Leadership Trendsetter Award that recognized The Training Institute as a first-year program leading the charge in food safety leadership, initiative, and accomplishments.

The Training Institute was endorsed by the FDA’s Partnership for Food Protection Training Workgroup and started work on its goals, including identifying and cataloging nearly 900 existing food safety courses in the U.S.

In June 2010, The Training Institute coordinated emergency training for states in response to the BP Oil Spill. Nearly 60 officials were funded by The Training Institute to attend seafood sensory training given by expert responders in partnership with the National Oceanic and Atmospheric Administration. This training allowed state officials to make decisions about closing fishing areas as well as evaluate the safety of seafood harvested in the Gulf.

The International Food Protection Training Institute's signature training program, The Fellowship in Food Protection: Applied Science, Law, and Policy, has received accreditation from the American National Standards Institute (ANSI). The Fellowship in Food Protection program, established in 2010, is designed to provide experienced food regulatory professionals from all areas of food protection with critical-thinking, problem-solving, and decision-making skills within the framework of food regulatory science, law, and policy. Program participants take three week-long seminars over a one-year period, conduct research on food safety issues, and then share their newfound knowledge with colleagues in the food protection field.

By September 2012, more than 2,250 food protection professionals from 49 states and seven other countries attended training hosted or sponsored by The Training Institute.

== Funding ==
In 2009, the W.K. Kellogg Foundation donated $5 million in seed money to create The Training Institute.

The Training Institute received $1 million as designated in a 2010 federal appropriations bill which provides funding for the U.S. Department of Agriculture, U.S. Food and Drug Administration, and related agencies.

In September 2011, The Training Institute received a multi-year grant of $1.3 million per year for five years from the Food and Drug Administration. The funding assists the joint efforts by FDA and The Training Institute to implement the national food training infrastructure mandated by the FDA Food Safety Modernization Act.

== Advisory Council ==
The Training Institute Advisory Council represents a diverse group of food protection communities—including federal regulatory agencies, state and local food protection agencies and associations, industry, consumer advocates, and academia.

Participating organizations include:

Association of American Feed Control Officials

Association of Food & Drug Officials

Association of Public Health Laboratories

Association of State and Territorial Health Officials

Centers for Disease Control and Prevention

Cornell University

Council of State and Territorial Epidemiologists

FDA’s 50-State Training Workgroup

Food Marketing Institute

Global Food Protection Institute

Grocery Manufacturers Association

Institute of Food Technologists

Iowa State University

Michigan State University

National Association of County and City Health Officials

National Association of Local Boards of Health

National Association of State Departments of Agriculture

National Association of State Meat and Food Inspection Directors

National Center for Biomedical Research & Training at Louisiana State University

National Environmental Health Association

U.S. Animal Health Association

U.S. Department of Agriculture

Food Safety and Inspection Service

United Fresh Produce Association

W.K. Kellogg Foundation

Western Michigan University

Food Allergy & Anaphylaxis Network
