= LaMar Hasbrouck =

American physician (born 1965)

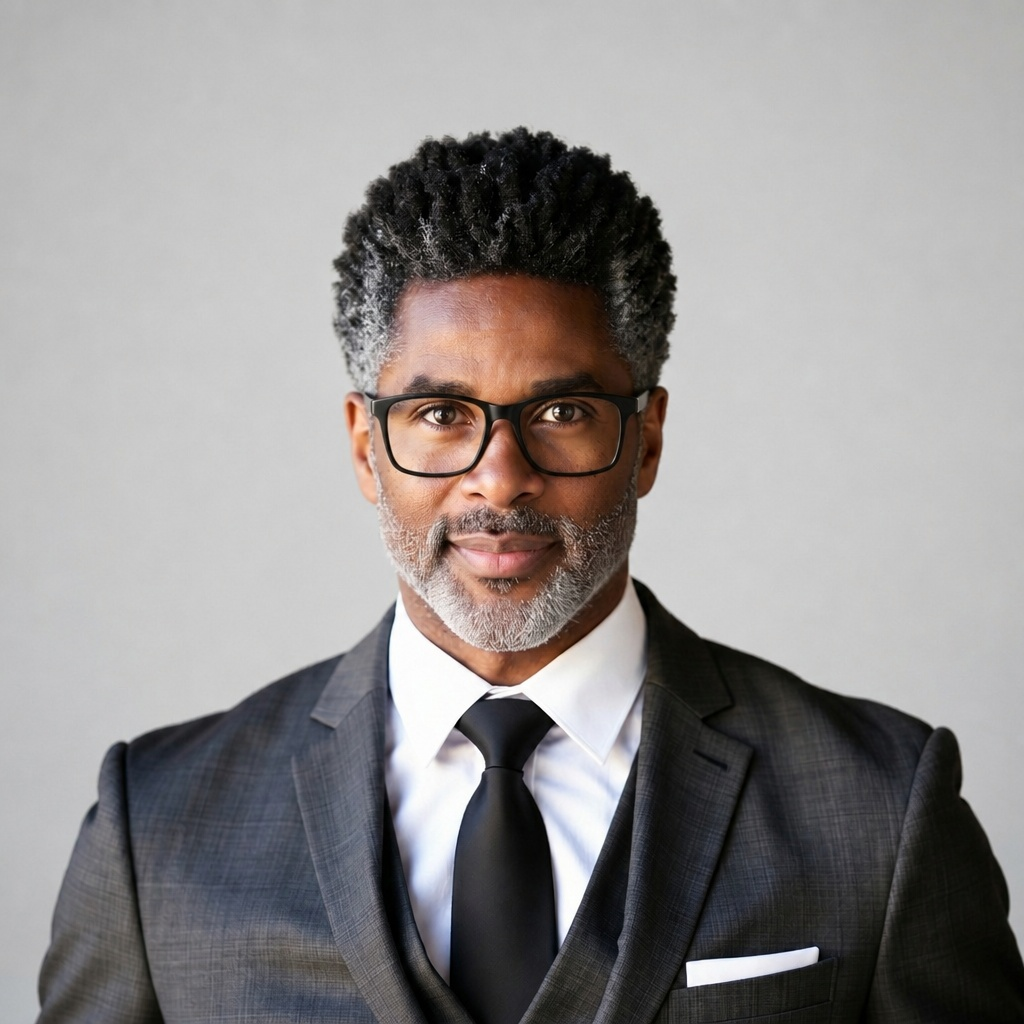
- Born: LaMar Hasbrouck; October 31, 1965 (age 60); San Diego, CA, U.S.
- Education: University of California, Berkeley (BA, MPH) University of California, Los Angeles (MD) University of Saint Mary (MBA)
- Occupations: Physician public health leader author
- Spouse: Hagir Elawad Hasbrouck (m. 2022)
- Medical career
- Profession: American physician, CDC-trained medical epidemiologist and public health leader
- Field: Medicine, Population Health
- Institutions: National Association of County and City Health Officials; Illinois Department of Public Health; United States Centers for Disease Control and Prevention
- Website: https://drlamarmd.org/

LaMar Hasbrouck (born 31 October, 1965) ) is an American physician, CDC-trained medical epidemiologist, and public health leader. He is the former executive director for the National Association of County and City Health Officials and served as the director of the Illinois Department of Public Health and State Health Officer for Illinois. Hasbrouck is a health policy contributing writer for The Hill, a recurrent guest on CNN, the former host of AMA Doc Talk, a podcast by the American Medical Association, and the managing director for DLM LLC, a health consulting firm. Hasbrouck has also authored two books: COVID Bytes: Naked Musings of a Disease Detective (2022) and his memoir, G Street Lion: Stalking a Dream (2016).

== Early life and education ==
Hasbrouck grew up in San Diego, California, and attended Will C. Crawford High School. He completed his Bachelor of Arts degree from the University of California, Berkeley, in 1988 and earned his Master of Public Health degree from the UC Berkeley School of Public Health in 1990. In 1994, he graduated with a Doctor of Medicine degree from the joint program of the David Geffen School of Medicine at UCLA and Charles R. Drew University of Medicine and Science. He received the Charles Donald O'Malley Prize in Medical History and was recognized as a Dean's Scholar for his medical thesis titled, The Flexner Report of 1910 and the Well-Being of Black Americans: Historical Underpinnings of a Contemporary Health Crisis.

Hasbrouck completed his residency in internal medicine at the Weill Cornell Medical Center New York-Presbyterian Hospital from 1994 to 1997 and was a founding member and inaugural chair of the Minority House Staff Committee, established in 1995 to increase the number of residents who are traditionally underrepresented in internal medicine. In 2012, he completed the Harvard Kennedy School program for Senior Executives in State and Local Government. He earned his MBA with a concentration in leadership and organizational health from the University of Saint Mary in 2019.

== Career ==
=== Medical epidemiologist ===
Hasbrouck began his career at the Centers for Disease Control in 1998 as a select member of the Epidemic Intelligence Service (EIS), known colloquially as "disease detectives." From 2000 – 2003, Hasbrouck was a medical officer with the National Center for Injury and Prevention Control and was the primary CDC scientist and contributing writer for the Surgeon General's Report on Youth Violence (2001). He was actively engaged in two of the largest global health initiatives in history: the World Health Organization's polio eradication program; and, the US President's Emergency Plan for AIDS Relief. He was a short-term consultant for the World Health Organization as a member of the CDC Stop Transmission of Polio (STOP) program assigned to Bangladesh. From 2004 to 2007, Hasbrouck was a senior medical officer with the Division of Global HIV/AIDS. He supported the President's Emergency Plan for AIDS Relief (PEPFAR) programs in Namibia, Nigeria, and Haiti. In October 2007, Hasbrouck was appointed Chief of Party for CDC in Guyana, South America. As a diplomat member of the US Embassy from 2007 to 2009, Hasbrouck led the PEPFAR program, oversaw completion of the National Public Health Reference Laboratory and helped to coordinate the humanitarian and civic assistance mission by the USS Kearsarge as a part of Operation Continuing Promise in 2008.

=== Local, State, and National Public Health Leadership ===
Hasbrouck has made substantial contributions as a public health leader at local, state, and national levels. As the Chief Operating Officer of the Cook County Department of Public Health in Illinois from 2022 to 2025 , he enhanced customer experience and operational efficiency within a comprehensive healthcare system serving the nation's second-largest county. He developed the strategic plan "Putting the Public in Public Health," establishing performance metrics for 2.3 million residents. Additionally, he established the Public Health Heroes League initiative, which focused on community education and activation, leading to a dramatic increase in media coverage and significantly enhancing community engagement. He also managed millions in COVID-19 relief funding for essential health initiatives.

From 2015 to 2017, Hasbrouck served as the executive director for the National Association of County and City Health Officials (NACCHO), a Washington, DC-based organization representing nearly 3,000 local health departments in the U.S. In this role, he represented the voice of local public health on national issues of critical importance, advocating for increased federal funding for public health infrastructure, emergency preparedness, and Zika virus response.

Prior to his work at NACCHO, Hasbrouck was appointed by Governor Pat Quinn as the Director of the Illinois Department of Public Health (IDPH) in 2012, becoming the 17th leader of one of the state's oldest health agencies. During his time in this position, he actively contributed to the Governor's Health Innovation and Transformation (GOHIT) team, dedicated to implementing the Affordable Care Act and expanding Medicaid coverage across the state. He directed statewide responses to various public health challenges, including flu outbreaks, the Middle East respiratory syndrome (MERS), and served as co-chair of the state's Ebola Task Force. Hasbrouck concluded his role in early 2015 following the governor's reelection loss.

Before his tenure in Cook County, Hasbrouck served as the Health Director of Ulster County, New York, from 2009 to 2012, focusing on health programs that targeted disparities and directed resources to vulnerable populations.

In addition to his leadership roles, Hasbrouck has remained engaged in public health at a national level. He has served as a senior advisor for Population Health at the Saudi Arabian Council of Cooperative Health Insurance and as Senior Advisor for Strategy and Growth with the American Medical Association, where he focused on developing strategies to close gaps in chronic disease prevention. His academic contributions include faculty positions at Emory University School of Medicine, Morehouse School of Medicine, New York Medical College and the University of Illinois at Chicago School of Public Health.

== Research ==
Hasbrouck's research and scholarly work have focused on public health systems, health equity, population-level prevention, and translating public health objectives into measurable policy and program outcomes. He has written and commented on national-level health planning, including the Healthy People 2030 framework, as well as strategies to strengthen local public health capacity and workforce development. His work frequently emphasizes reducing health disparities, improving access to preventive services, and integrating evidence into public health practice and policy.

He has published peer-reviewed articles and editorials on topics such as the value of prevention research, the alignment of educational pipelines with local public health workforce needs, and the design of national objectives for health promotion and measurement. Drawing on his experience in federal, state, and local public health leadership, Hasbrouck advocates for stronger local public health infrastructure and for metrics that support accountability and equity in population health.

=== COVID-19 Pandemic ===
Hasbrouck leverages his background in medicine, epidemiology, public health, and health policy to provide expert insights to print, broadcast, and digital media, including CNN, USA Today, and the Chicago Tribune. He authored the book COVID Bytes: Naked Musings of a Disease Detective, based on his popular blog that offers a real-time, science-informed, and witty critique of the first 12 months of the pandemic.

In addition to academic publications, Hasbrouck has produced policy commentary and practitioner-oriented pieces addressing contemporary public health challenges, such as COVID-19 response, chronic disease prevention, and the social determinants of health. He utilizes his breadth of experience to inform recommendations for practice and policy. An active public health communicator, Hasbrouck has contributed to publications like The Hill and hosted the American Medical Association podcast AMA Doc Talk. Throughout the COVID-19 pandemic, he has been a prominent voice in public health discourse.

== Honors ==
Hasbrouck has received numerous accolades for his contributions to public health, including the Top Blacks in Healthcare Award from BlackDoctor.org and the Johns Hopkins Center for Health Disparities Solutions in 2016 , as well as recognition as a Notable Alumni by Weill Cornell Medicine in 2015. He has also been honored with several United States Public Health Service Outstanding Unit Citations, including for the H1N1 pandemic in 2010, PEPFAR in 2007, and the smallpox vaccination program in 2004. Other awards include the Public Health Service Foreign Duty Award for the polio eradication program in 2002, and the Secretary's Award for Distinguished Service from the U.S. Department of Health and Human Services in 2000.

In addition, Hasbrouck has served as a commencement speaker at various institutions. He delivered the commencement address for the public health program at Northwestern School of Medicine on May 22, 2013, and addressed the University of Illinois at Chicago graduating class on May 8, 2015. On May 19, 2019, he was awarded an honorary Associate of Arts degree for his accomplishments in community health from South Suburban College of Cook County, where he also gave the commencement address. Most recently, on June 6, 2022, he presented the commencement address to the Charles R. Drew University of Medicine and Science class of 2022. In 2023, Hasbrouck received the UCLA Award for Public Service, one of the highest tributes bestowed on alumni, in recognition of his leadership in public health and efforts toward health equity.

== Personal life ==
Hasbrouck is married to Hagir Elawad and has a teenage stepson, as well as three adult daughters from a previous marriage. He is a former NCAA Division I collegiate athlete and a passionate track and field enthusiast. As a USATF Masters All-American sprinter, he was ranked 1st nationally in the 100-meter hurdles in 2025 and was the 2022 USATF Masters Indoor Champion in the 60-meter hurdles. Currently, he trains and resides in the Chicago area.

== Bibliography ==
- Hasbrouck, LaMar (May 27, 2016). G Street Lion: Stalking a Dream. ISBN 978-1491792568.
- Hasbrouck, LaMar (February 17, 2022). Covid Bytes: Naked Musings of a Disease Detective. Readersmagnet LLC. ISBN 978-1956780352.
