= Winthrop Poll =

The Winthrop Poll, also known as the "Winthrop University Poll," is a long-term survey initiative conducted by Winthrop University's Center for Public Opinion & Policy Research (CPOPR). It informs public policy makers and the general public about the attitudes and opinions of citizens in the state of South Carolina and the southern region of the United States. During the 2020 US Democratic primary, the Democratic National Committee (DNC) designated the Winthrop Poll as one of the threshold polls used to qualify presidential candidates for debates. Topics of the poll typically include political candidates and politically relevant issues. Results of the poll are cited regularly by national and international news organizations such as Time (magazine), Politico, The Hill, the BBC, Washington Post, MSNBC, and CNN.

The Social and Behavioral Research Lab at Winthrop, which originally conducted the poll, was a charter member of the American Association for Public Opinion Research.

== History ==
Professor Scott Huffmon began the polling initiative in 2002 as part of a Winthrop University “Scope and Methods” research class. The first intrastate polling was conducted in 2003 and the first statewide poll took place in 2006.

In 2019, the CPOPR received over three million dollars in grants from the U.S. Centers for Disease Control and Prevention and the S.C. Department of Health and Environmental Control to support social behavior and health research.

== Criticism ==
Some have criticized the poll for being inaccurate or questionable. However, the poll's director, Scott Huffmon, has defended the methodology used.
