= William Augustus Hinton =

American bacteriologist, pathologist and educator

- Born: December 15, 1883; Chicago, Illinois, U.S.
- Died: August 8, 1959 (aged 75); Canton, Massachusetts, U.S.
- Occupation: Bacteriologist
- Known for: Harvard Medical School professor
- Children: Jane Hinton

William Augustus Hinton (December 15, 1883 – August 8, 1959) was an American bacteriologist, pathologist and educator. He was the first Black professor in the history of Harvard University. A pioneer in the field of public health, Hinton developed a test for syphilis (the Hinton test) which, because of its accuracy, was used by the United States Public Health Service. In 1975, the Massachusetts legislature made what had become known as the "Hinton Laboratory" in the scientific community official, passing a bill to rename the state laboratory the "Dr. William A. Hinton Laboratory." In 2019, Hinton's portrait was placed in Harvard Medical School's Waterhouse Room, a room previously dominated by the portraits of former Harvard Medical School Deans, all of whom were white.

== Early life and education ==
William Augustus Hinton was born in Chicago to Augustus Hinton and Maria Clark, both former slaves. Hinton grew up in Kansas. After high school, he studied at the University of Kansas before transferring to Harvard University, where he earned a B.S. degree in 1905. Following his graduation, he taught in Tennessee and Oklahoma. During the summers he continued his studies in bacteriology and physiology at the University of Chicago. In 1909, he enrolled in Harvard Medical School and was offered a scholarship reserved for African-American students, which he declined. Instead, he competed for and won the prestigious Wigglesworth and Hayden scholarships two years in a row, a scholarship open to all Harvard students. He graduated with honors in 1912 after only three years.

== Early career ==
Although he was denied a medical internship or a residency in surgery due to his race, Hinton worked as a "voluntary assistant" in the Pathology Laboratory at Massachusetts General Hospital from 1913 to 1915. It was in this position that he became an expert in syphilis, publishing his first paper along with Roger I. Lee. Gaining the respect of his colleagues, he was invited to write a chapter in a leading textbook, Preventive Medicine and Hygiene. In 1915 he was awarded the dual appointments of director of the Laboratory Department of the Boston Dispensary and chief of the Wasserman Laboratory of the Massachusetts Department of Public Health, staying at the latter position until his retirement in 1953. Under his supervision, the number of approved laboratories grew from 10 to 117.

After his professional career took off, Hinton returned to Harvard Medical School in 1918 as an instructor in preventive medicine and hygiene. In 1921 he began teaching bacteriology and immunology—subjects he would teach at Harvard for more than 30 years. Also in 1921, Hinton became the first Black scientist to become a member of the American Society for Microbiology, even though he never attended a society meeting, fearing that if he were known to be Black, his colleagues would not take his scientific work seriously any more. For the majority of his time at Harvard, Hinton was an assistant and then a lecturer. He was only made a full professor on the eve of his retirement, when Harvard named him Clinical Professor of Bacteriology and Immunology, making him the first African American to be appointed professor at the university.

Hinton developed a flocculation test for syphilis in 1927, and co-developed another syphilis test using spinal fluid with a colleague that would come to be known as the Davies-Hinton test. These tests were considered a boon for medicine, as the treatment for syphilis at the time was long, painful, and hazardous.

During his career, Hinton taught at Simmons College, the Harvard School of Public Health, and the Tufts Medical and Dental Schools. He also started a school for laboratory technicians open only to women, the first of its kind, and saw its graduates get hired quickly throughout the country. This school helped open the field up to women. His daughter, Jane Hinton, would go on to co-develop what would come to be known as the Mueller–Hinton agar.

== International recognition ==
Hinton became internationally known as an expert in the diagnosis and treatment of syphilis. His serological test for syphilis, which proved to be more accurate than currently accepted tests, was endorsed by the U.S. Public Health Service in 1934. Hinton's test also was simple, quick, and unambiguous.

In 1936 Hinton published the first medical textbook by a Black American: Syphilis and Its Treatment. He was adamant about the role of socioeconomics in health and called syphilis "a disease of the underprivileged."

Hinton turned down the NAACP's 1938 Spingarn Medal award because he wanted his work to stand on its own merit; he was concerned that his work would not be as well received if it was widely known in his profession that he was Black. "Race should never get mixed up in the struggle for human welfare," he would later say.

In 1948, in recognition of his contributions as a serologist and public health bacteriologist, Hinton was elected a life member of the American Social Science Association. The serology lab at the Massachusetts Department of Public Health's Laboratory Institute Building was named for him.

In 1960, Nobel Laureate John Enders wrote a Harvard University "Memorial Minute" about Hinton, highlighting his many contributions.

In 2015, the University of South Carolina School of Medicine Greenville named one of its inaugural college societies after Hinton. The Hinton college went on to consistently perform at higher standards than the university's other colleges, such as Hunter, and two other less successful colleges.

The American Society for Microbiology awards the William A. Hinton Award for Advancement of a Diverse Community of Microbiologists to nominees who have contributed to the research training of students of underrepresented minorities in microbiology.

== Later career ==
Although Hinton retired from Harvard in 1950, he continued to teach there for several years and served as a physician at the Mass Hospital School for Crippled Children in Canton, Massachusetts. Until 1953, he served as physician-in-chief of the Department of Clinical Laboratories of the Boston Dispensary. Also, he served as a special consultant to the U.S. Public Health Service.

Hinton was named a lifetime member of the American Social Hygiene Association in 1948 as a "distinguished scientist, leading serologist, and public health bacteriologist."

== Personal life ==
William Hinton was the son of two former slaves freed after the Civil War. His father Augustus became a farmer and railroad porter, while his mother, Maria, also became a farmer. He would later will his $75,000 in savings to be put into a special scholarship fund for Harvard graduate students as a memorial to his parents and the ideals of conduct they passed on to him. He named the scholarship fund after President Dwight D. Eisenhower to recognize the leader who he believed had made great strides in providing equal opportunity employment during his administration. In his book Mandate for Change, Eisenhower reflected on this scholarship, writing "I could not recall having been given a personal distinction that had touched me more deeply."

Hinton met his future wife, Ada Hawes, a teacher in Langston, OK, where he was teaching at Oklahoma Colored Agricultural and Normal University (now Langston University). They were married in 1909. The couple had two daughters, Anne Hinton Jones and Dr. Jane Hinton, one of the first two African-American women to gain the degree of Doctor of Veterinary Medicine. In 1940, Hinton lost a leg after a car accident. He died in 1959 from complications related to diabetes.

== Legacy ==
On September 13, 2019, a painting of Hinton was unveiled in Harvard Medical School's Waterhouse Room, previously dominated by the portraits of all-white former Deans. The portrait was commissioned at the request of the founding director of the Harvard Foundation for Intercultural and Race Relations, S. Allen Counter. The artist, Stephen E. Coit, portrayed Hinton in a microbiology lab of the 1920s with researchers in the background including a woman and a young Black man. The presence of the female researcher in the portrait recognizes the fact that Hinton worked to break down barriers for women, teaching at Simmons College and establishing a laboratory technicians training school open only to women. In September 2020, Harvard Medical School renamed the Holmes Society in honor of Dr. Hinton in recognition of his pioneering work as a scientist.
