= John Howard Mueller =

American bacteriologist (1891–1954)

John Howard Mueller (June 13, 1891, Sheffield, Massachusetts – February 14, 1954) was an American biochemist, pathologist, and bacteriologist. He is known as the discoverer of the amino acid methionine in 1921, and as the co-developer, with Jane Hinton, of the eponymous Mueller–Hinton agar.

== Biography ==
J. Howard Mueller was the son of a Unitarian clergyman and grew up in Illinois. He studied biology at Illinois Wesleyan University with a bachelor's degree in 1912. He was then a chemistry instructor at the University of Louisville for two years before receiving his master's degree in 1914. He became interested in pathology and bacteriology and in 1914 attended a summer course at the Medical Faculty of Columbia University. He stayed there for further studies after receiving a scholarship and received in 1916 his doctorate Ph.D. in pathology. He then became an assistant pathologist at the New York Presbyterian Hospital. In 1917 he was a volunteer at the front in France with a medical unit and was involved in empirical proof of the transmission of trench fever by lice. In 1919 he was discharged as a lieutenant and became an instructor in bacteriology under Hans Zinsser at Columbia University. (The academic position to which Mueller was appointed was formerly held by Joseph Gardner Hopkins MD (1882–1951), who was promoted.) At Columbia, Mueller did research on the requirements for the growth of cultures of pathogenic bacteria. He wrote:

Perhaps the most important results to which success in such a piece of work might lead, are the applications of the findings to problems of more general biological importance, particularly to those of animal metabolism. For, whatever may prove to be the nature of these substances which cause growth of bacteria, they are largely or entirely components of animal tissue, and it is probable that they are either needed also by the animal body and supplied by plant or other sources, or else are synthesized by the animal itself to fill some metabolic requirement. When it is possible to catalogue the substances required by pathogenic bacteria for growth, it will probably be found that most of them are either required by, or important in, animal metabolism, and while many of them will surely be compounds at present familiar to the physiological chemist, it is equally probable that some will be new, or at least of hitherto unrecognized importance.

He was the first to succeed in isolating and characterizing methionine, which certain streptococci needed for their growth. In 1923 when Zinnser was appointed as the chair of the department of bacteriology and immunology at Harvard Medical School, Mueller followed him and became an assistant professor there. However, Mueller had to interrupt his work on bacterial metabolism, including work on Rous sarcoma virus with a dispute over William Ewart Gye's theory. In 1930 Mueller began his studies on the nutritional requirements of the diphtheria bacillus.

Within a few years the Mueller laboratory had identified which amino acids were essential for growth of the diphtheria bacillus and had made the important observation that different strains of the same bacillus varied widely in their amino acid requirements.

His work with the diphtheria pathogen was also of practical importance for the development of vaccines against diphtheria (by optimizing the bacterial cultures). From the early 1940s, he turned to research on the tetanus pathogen. After Zinsser's death in 1940, Mueller became head of the bacteriology department at Harvard. He continued to do research. He arrived several hours early at his laboratory and experimented until his co-workers arrived in the morning, then gave the research to his assistant Pauline Miller so that could devoted himself to administrative work. In addition to basic research, he always aimed at medical applications to fight infectious agents.

In 1944 when Oswald Avery, Colin MacLeod and Maclyn McCarty published their research on bacterial DNA, Mueller understood the meaning and importance of their results and published his viewpoint in 1945 in a review article.

Mueller was elected a fellow of the American Academy of Arts and Sciences in 1928 and a member of the National Academy of Sciences in 1945.

== Selected publications ==
- Mueller, J. H. (1922). "Studies on Cultural Requirements of Bacteria. II". Journal of Bacteriology. 7 (3): 325–338. doi:10.1128/JB.7.3.325-338.1922. PMC 378973. PMID 16558960.
- Zinsser, Hans; Mueller, J. Howard (1925). "On the Nature of Bacterial Allergies". The Journal of Experimental Medicine. 41 (1): 159–177. doi:10.1084/jem.41.1.159. PMC 2130923. PMID 19868971.
- Mueller, J. H.; Klise, K. S.; Porter, E. F.; Graybiel, A. (1933). "Studies on Cultural Requirements of Bacteria: III. The Diphtheria Bacillus". Journal of Bacteriology. 25 (5): 509–519. doi:10.1128/JB.25.5.509-519.1933. PMC 533524. PMID 16559631.
- Mueller, J. H. (1937). "Nicotinic Acid as a Growth Accessory Substance for the Diphtheria Bacillus". Journal of Bacteriology. 34 (4): 429–41. doi:10.1128/JB.34.4.429-441.1937. PMC 545244. PMID 16560065.
- Mueller, J. H.; Hinton, J. (1941). "A Protein-Free Medium for Primary Isolation of the Gonococcus and Meningococcus". Experimental Biology and Medicine. 48: 330–333. doi:10.3181/00379727-48-13311. S2CID 84378770.
- Cohen, S.; Snyder, J. C.; Mueller, J. H. (1941). "Factors Concerned in the Growth of Corynebacterium diphtheriae from Minute Inocula". Journal of Bacteriology. 41 (5): 581–91. doi:10.1128/JB.41.5.581-591.1941. PMC 374722. PMID 16560425.
- Mueller, J. H. "Nutrition of the single cell: Its application to medical bacteriology". Harvey Lecture Series. 39, 1943/44: 143–161. (See Harvey Society.)
- Mueller, J. H. (1945). "The chemistry and metabolism of bacteria". Annual Review of Biochemistry. 14 (1): 733–748. doi:10.1146/annurev.bi.14.070145.003505.
- Ley Jr, H. L.; Mueller, J. H. (1946). "On the Isolation from Agar of an Inhibitor for Neisseria gonorrhoeae". Journal of Bacteriology. 52 (4): 453–60. doi:10.1128/JB.52.4.453-460.1946. PMC 518211. PMID 16561199.
- Aycock, W. L.; Mueller, J. H.; Carroll, F. B. (1950). "Meningococcus Carrier Rates and Meningitis Incidence". Bacteriological Reviews. 14 (2): 115–160. doi:10.1128/MMBR.14.2.115-160.1950. PMC 440962. PMID 15426617.
- Mueller, J. H.; Miller, P. A. (1954). "Variable factors influencing the production of tetanus toxin". Journal of Bacteriology. 67 (3): 271–7. doi:10.1128/JB.67.3.271-277.1954. PMC 357220. PMID 13142991.
