= Nicole Alexander-Scott =

American infectious disease specialist

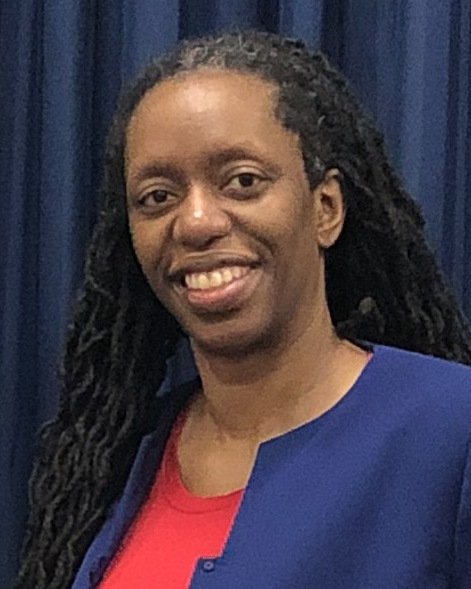

Director of the Rhode Island Department of Health
- In office April 2015 – January 2022
- Governor: Gina Raimondo; Dan McKee
- Preceded by: Michael Fine
- Succeeded by: James McDonald (interim)

Personal details
- Education: Cornell University; SUNY Upstate Medical University; Brown University

Nicole Alexander-Scott is an American infectious disease specialist who served as Director of the Rhode Island Department of Health from April 2015 to January 2022. She was the first African-American to serve in the role.

== Education ==
Nicole Alexander-Scott grew up in Park Slope, Brooklyn, New York City. Her mother worked as a nurse and her father died when she was 11. Alexander-Scott graduated from an all-girls Catholic high school and attended Cornell University’s College of Human Ecology. She graduated from Cornell with a B.Sc. in Human Development and Family Studies in 1997.

She earned her M.D. from the State University of New York Upstate Medical University in 2001 and completed her residency at Stony Brook University Hospital, in Stony Brook, New York. In 2005, she moved to Rhode Island to complete an infectious disease fellowship at the Warren Alpert Medical School of Brown University. In 2011, she earned a Masters of Public Health degree from the Brown University School of Public Health.

== Career ==
Alexander-Scott served as a consultant to the Rhode Island Department of Health during the 2009 swine flu pandemic. She was appointed Director of the Rhode Island Department of Health on April 16, 2015, succeeding Dr. Michael Fine.

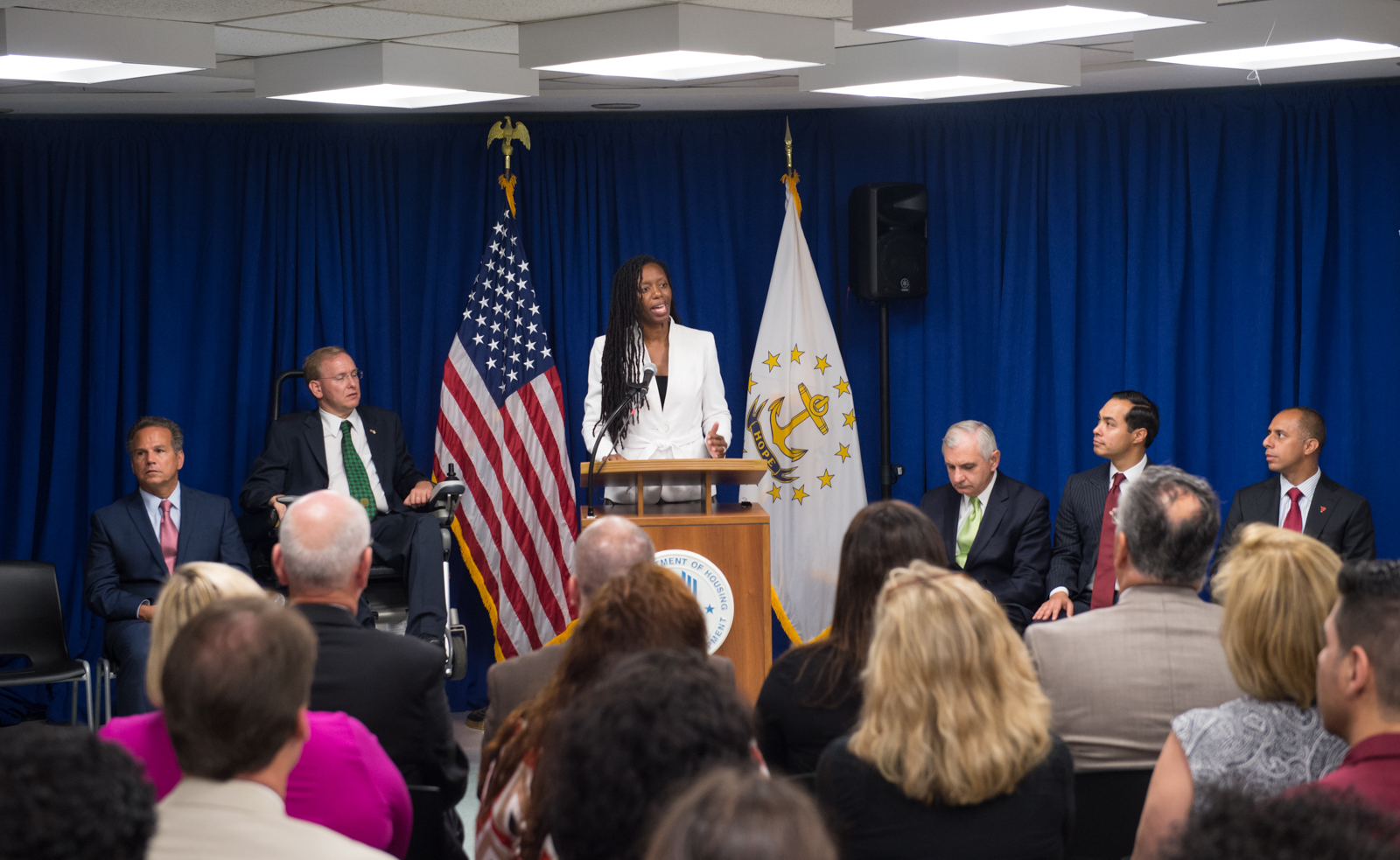
Alexander-Scott in 2016 with David Cicilline, James Langevin, Jack Reed, Julian Castro, and Jorge Elorza

From 2018 to 2019, she served as president of the Association of State and Territorial Health Officials.

Alexander-Scott has played an active role in the Rhode Island Department of Health's response to the COVID-19 pandemic in Rhode Island. In December 2020, she tested positive for COVID-19.

Alexander-Scott was reappointed in 2020 to a five-year term. However, in January 2022, she announced her resigned from the state Department of Health. James McDonald succeeded her as interim director of the Department in late January 2022.

== Honors and awards ==
- Doctorate of Humane Letters, Brown University, 2022
