= Oregon State Sanitary Authority =

Agency overview
- Formed: 1938
- Dissolved: 1969
- Superseding agency: Oregon Department of Environmental Quality

The Oregon State Sanitary Authority (OSSA) was the first agency in the U.S. state of Oregon that was charged with protecting the environment. In 1938, Oregon voters, by a three-to-one margin, approved an initiative to regulate water pollution and to create an enforcement agency under the jurisdiction of the Oregon State Board of Health. Efforts to address water pollution began as early as the 1920s, when organizations such as the U.S. Public Health Service, the Board of Health, and the Izaak Walton League raised concerns about its effects on human health. Pollution had caused many fish kills on the Willamette River in the 1920s, and Portland, on the lower river, had often closed its part of the Willamette to swimming because of sewage in the water.

Since many of the biggest polluters were along the Willamette, OSSA focused its efforts there. Raw domestic sewage from cities and wastes from pulp mills, paper mills, and other industrial sites produced the greatest volumes of pollutants. By the late 1940s, OSSA had induced communities along the river to install sewage treatment plants. However, the agency had less success with mill owners, who resisted pollution controls on grounds of the expense. Of particular concern were sulfite process mills that discharged plumes of waste that were deadly to many aquatic plants and animals. As late as 1969, low oxygen levels related to pollution were preventing upstream migration of salmon on the Willamette. The fish were able to continue only after Governor Tom McCall, the OSSA chairman, ordered the temporary closure of four sulfite mills along the river.

In 1969, the Oregon Legislative Assembly replaced OSSA with the Department of Environmental Quality (DEQ). Its responsibilities include protecting the state's air quality as well as its water quality; managing solid- and hazardous-waste disposal; helping with contamination cleanup, and enforcing the state's environmental laws.
