= Association of Public Health Laboratories =

Nonprofit professional association

- Abbreviation: APHL
- Founded: 1998
- Type: Nonprofit professional association
- Headquarters: Bethesda, Maryland, U.S.
- Chief Executive Officer: Scott J. Becker, MS
- Website: www.aphl.org

The Association of Public Health Laboratories (APHL) is a membership organization in the United States representing the laboratories that protect the health and safety of the public. APHL serves as a liaison between public health laboratories and federal and international agencies. Membership consists of local, state, county, and territorial public health laboratories; public health environmental, agricultural and veterinary laboratories; and corporations and individuals with an interest in public health and laboratory science. APHL is a non-profit, 501(c)(3) organization with a history of over fifty years.

== Public health laboratories ==
Public health laboratories operate as a first line of defense to protect the public against diseases and other health hazards. Day-to-day operations range from testing water and food, checking for toxins in soil, and investigating new strains of infectious diseases, such as COVID-19 or Ebola.

Every US state and territory, and the District of Columbia, has a central governmental public health laboratory that performs testing and other laboratory services on behalf of the entire jurisdiction. In addition, some states have local public health laboratories ranging in size from large metropolitan laboratories with over a hundred scientists to small rural laboratories with one or two staff that support local public health.

== Programs ==
=== Environmental health ===
Environmental health laboratories are governmental laboratories that conduct testing to protect human health and the environment. In some states, a single laboratory acts as both the environmental and the public health laboratory. In other states, the environmental laboratory is part of the department of environmental quality or natural resources while the public health laboratory is part of the health department.

Environmental health laboratories help to identify contaminants by conducting regular testing of water, air, soil, food and other media to ensure that populations are not being exposed to unhealthy levels of contamination.

APHL supports these laboratories by coordinating a response to environmental health issues. They assist in providing information and training to the scientists working in the labs, and serve as a link between member laboratories and federal agencies, including Centers for Disease Control and Prevention's (CDC) National Center for Environmental Health and the US Environmental Protection Agency.

=== Food safety ===
With food sourced around the world, it's necessary to monitor and test the food supply to detect, and contain outbreaks, such as E. coli in lettuce or Salmonella in peanut butter. Testing performed by public health laboratories is a critical link in the chain of detection to quickly identify the source of the outbreak and recall of unsafe products.

Testing for food safety may take place in a public health laboratory or in a food lab within the department of agriculture.

APHL supports laboratories by providing information and training to scientists to ensure they are utilizing the latest research and most efficient testing procedures. By coordinating the efforts of labs around the country, APHL helps ensure high quality data is used to keep food safe. This information is available for epidemiologists, regulators and policy makers to create food safety programs and policies.

APHL collaborates with partners at the CDC, the United States Department of Agriculture-Food Safety Inspection Service, the Food and Drug Administration (FDA) and related organizations. Specifically, the program works closely with CDC's Division of Foodborne, Bacterial and Mycotic Diseases to support state and local laboratories in PulseNet, that recognizes and identifies foodborne outbreaks as soon as possible.

APHL is also an active member of the Council to Improve Foodborne Outbreak Response (CIFOR), which integrates local, state and federal efforts across many food safety disciplines to reduce the burden of foodborne illness in the United States. They also sit on the Advisory Council for the International Food Protection Training Institute.

=== Global health ===
While APHL primarily focuses on public health laboratories in the United States, their global health program makes an effort to help other countries strengthen their own laboratory practices.APHL works with more than 30 countries to:

- Share effective testing procedures
- Develop laboratory policies
- Improve the quality of data
- Train laboratory leaders
- Utilize information management systems
- Create strategies to monitor and detect
- Establish emergency response programs
- Design training programs

APHL also works with public health laboratories around the world to share information on global health crises and promotes cross-border collaboration.

=== Infectious diseases ===
APHL supports the role of the public health laboratory in disease detection and surveillance, and works to expand and enhance relationships among member laboratories, by coordinating with the CDC, other federal and state agencies, associations and academia involved in relevant public health activities, including laboratory testing, policy and training. As of December 2021 the director of this group was Kelly Wroblewski.

APHL's infectious disease programs focuses on continuous monitoring on spread of the following infectious diseases including:

- Arboviruses, including West Nile, Dengue, Chikungunya and Zika viruses
- Coronavirus (COVID-19)
- Ebola
- HIV
- Influenza
- Rabies
- Sexually transmitted diseases including Chlamydia, Gonorrhea, Herpes Simplex Virus, HPV, Syphilis and Trichomoniasis
- Tuberculosis
- Vaccine preventable diseases, including measles, mumps and rubella (MMR vaccines) and diphtheria, tetanus and pertussis (DTP)
- Viral Hepatitis

=== Informatics ===
Informatics is the science of using data, information, and knowledge to improve human health. APHL is a leader in the movement to transform the transmission of health information from paper to electronic data and leverages a variety of technologies to help build a secure, nationwide health information infrastructure.

APHL not only supports the development of systems to exchange information, they provide technical support to public health laboratories, agencies and partners to help improve public health outcomes. Technical support includes:

- Developing standards-based messaging, to allow for automated data exchange
- Creating an exchange network, to ensure specific laboratories receive the information most pertinent to their work
- Improving reporting capabilities
- Selection and implementation of the best information management system for the laboratory's needs
- Strengthening the information network by sharing technical resources across public health laboratories

One effort by the Informatics program is PHLIP, the Public Health Laboratory Interoperability Project. PHLIP aims to establish reliable laboratory data exchange between state public health laboratories and the CDC by fostering collaboration in IT and laboratory science.

=== Quality Systems and Analytics ===
APHL works with public health partners to build the foundation for quality testing, comprehensive standards and integrated public health laboratory systems. One of the initiatives, the Laboratory System Improvement Program, provides individual assessments of public health laboratory systems that include engaging stakeholders for system improvement, performance, implementation of strategies and continual evaluation. APHL also collaborates on the National Laboratory System project to build a public-private network of laboratories nationwide.

APHL monitors trends in public health laboratory diagnostics, personnel and infrastructure in order to create quality assurance standards. By using these data points to benchmark individual labs against national norms, APHL is able to home in on key issues and help raise the standard of laboratory systems. Member labs have access to research and survey data online, which enables them to leverage new information quickly to identify promising strategies and practices.

=== Newborn screening and genetics ===
Newborn screening has been identified as one of the most effective means of disease prevention in the United States by testing every newborn baby for potentially fatal conditions that may not be immediately obvious. By testing babies before symptoms begin, newborn screening programs help prevent disabilities and decrease the newborn mortality rate.

APHL also provides input to the Newborn Screening Technical assistance and Evaluation Program (NewSTEPs) on quality control and information on newborn screening trends.

=== Public health preparedness and response ===
Public health emergencies can take many forms including:

- Outbreaks of disease
- Food-born illness
- Bioterrorism
- Natural disasters

APHL plays a critical role in crisis response to these public health emergencies through the Laboratory Response Network (LRN). The LRN was formed in 1999 in a cooperative effort between APHL, the CDC and FBI to rapidly detect, and respond to public health emergencies. The Department of Defense has joined in the effort to support biological response activities.

In addition to their leadership during times of crisis, APHL has a strong focus on preparing public health laboratories on how to respond to emergencies when they happen through training and capacity-building, as well as creating model frameworks that labs around the country can use in order to have procedures in place to handle a crisis when it happens.

=== Research ===
APHL monitors trends in public health laboratory diagnostics, personnel and infrastructure. It uses this data to benchmark against national norms and to define issues of importance to lab practice and policy. APHL also disseminates research findings via issue briefs and communications with federal decision makers, health partners and the laboratory community. Members have access to survey data online, enabling them to leverage this information quickly to identify promising strategies and practices.

== Laboratory education and training ==
=== Laboratory training ===
In an effort to improve laboratory practice, APHL provides free resources, such as tools kits that explain how to:

- Write a laboratory quality manual
- Conduct an internal audit
- Recruit students in STEM fields
- Deal with laboratory floods

In addition to on-demand research and reports, APHL provides continuing education courses to help laboratory scientists keep up with emerging trends, and innovative testing techniques. Training sessions are conducted through conferences, seminars, workshops and online courses.

=== Leadership and workforce development ===
APHL invests heavily in developing new leaders in public health. By sponsoring fellowship programs and orientation programs for new laboratory directions, APHL seeks to help scientists advance their careers while improving the overall quality of public health laboratories.

Emerging Leader Program (ELP) Public health laboratories need to keep up with global health trends while being called upon to respond to public health emergencies. In order to lead a public health laboratory, directors must not only be experts on laboratory science, but also understand administrative tasks like balancing a budget..

The ELP is a year-long cohort program designed to expose new leaders to all aspects of laboratory management. Participating scientists go through a series of workshops, and exercises on both leadership and project development.

Networking is also a strong component of the program, and each cohort class is introduced to the Emerging Leader Alumni Network (ELAN) members, who help mentor emerging leaders. Following their 12-month program, the ELAN allows alumni to stay connected with their peers, who continue to learn together.

Fellowship Programs APHL fellowships are co-sponsored by the CDC, and offer graduates of bachelor's, master's and postdoctoral programs professional opportunities in public health laboratories across the US. As of mid-2021, APHL offers seven fellowship programs in infectious diseases, bioinformatics, antimicrobial resistance, environmental public health and newborn screening.

New Laboratory Directors' Orientation An intensive three-day orientation for new laboratory directors hosted at CDC. The program includes leadership assessment, team-building exercises, skill-building workshops and sessions with key staff from APHL and CDC.

== Publications ==
- Lab Matters: Each issue of APHL's quarterly magazine, Lab Matters, considers a pressing health issue of importance to public health laboratories.
- Bridges: Connecting the nation's environmental laboratories, Bridges is APHL's semi-annual newsletter for environmental health professionals.
- Social Media: APHL is active on Twitter, Facebook and LinkedIn, and has video channels on both YouTube and Vimeo.
- Blog: APHL's Public Health LabLog features recent and interesting stories about the work of APHL and public health laboratories.

== History ==
- 1899: American Public Health Association formed the Committee of Laboratories
- 1921: Southern Public Health Laboratory Association (SPHLA) formed
- 1927: SPHLA became State Laboratory Directors Conference and opened membership to other states
- 1939: SPHLA changed its name to Conference of State and Provincial Laboratory Directors
- 1951: Association of State and Territorial Public Health Laboratory Directors founded
- 1998: Renamed the Association of Public Health Laboratories (APHL) and became a more inclusive organization with new membership categories

== See also ==
- Public Health Laboratory
- Laboratory Response Network
