= Rhode Island Department of Health =

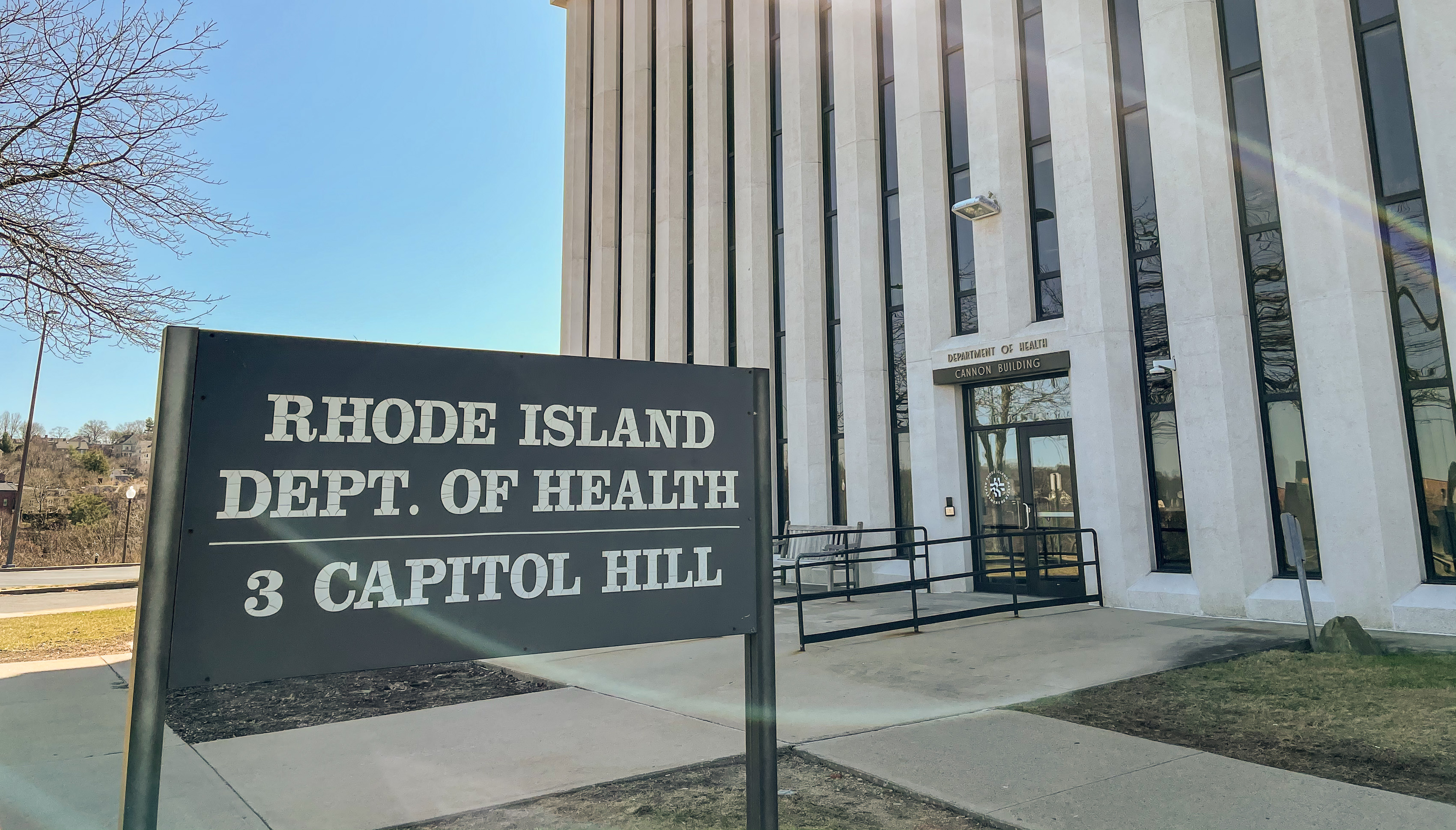

Agency overview
- Formed: 1935; 91 years ago
- Preceding agency: Rhode Island State Board of Health
- Type: State health agency
- Jurisdiction: Rhode Island
- Headquarters: Providence, Rhode Island
- Motto: "A better state of healthy"
- Employees: ~566
- Annual budget: $ 373,353,530
- Agency executives: Jerome Larkin, Director; Christine Goulette, Chief Operations Officer; Cheryl Leclair, Office of Policy; Zachary Garceau, Office of Health Regulation
- Website: health.ri.gov

The Rhode Island Department of Health (RIDOH) is the state health agency in the State of Rhode Island. The agency oversees public health, medical licensing, and retains medical and data records in Rhode Island.

As of May 2024, the Director of the Department of Health is Dr. Jerome Larkin. The position was previously held by various acting directors following the resignation of Nicole Alexander-Scott in January 2022.

== Mission, Vision, and Values ==
The Rhode Island Department of Health has the mission is to, "Prevent disease and protect and promote the health and safety of Rhode Islanders." As well as holding the vision for "safe and healthy lives in safe and healthy communities."

== Divisions and Centers ==
The Rhode Island Department of Health coordinates statewide public health activities across the state. All programs and services are coordinated by Divisions and Centers.

- Central Management is divided into three programs: Executive Functions, Management Services, and Emergency Preparedness and Response. Executive Functions is headed by the Director of Health and oversees all Department-sponsored activities. Management Services oversees the Department budget and provides support to manage programs. Emergency Preparedness and Response plans, assesses, educates, and supports the community during disasters or emergencies.
- The Office of State Medical Examiners investigates causes of death that may endanger the community and uses this information to keep the public aware and safe.
- Environmental and Health Services Regulation licenses and regulates health professionals and monitors beach and drinking water quality.
- The State Laboratories support scientific research to detect diseases, protect the public from terrorism threats health and use health evidence in crime investigations.
  - Rhode Island Division of State Laboratories
    - Rhode Island State Health Laboratory
    - Rhode Island Center for Biological Sciences
    - Rhode Island Center for Clinical Toxicology and Laboratory Support
    - Rhode Island Center for Environmental Sciences
    - Rhode Island Center for Forensic Sciences
    - Rhode Island Office of the State Medical Examiners
- Public Health Information provides information for the public to understand health risks and make healthy and safe choices.
- Community and Family Health and Equity develops programs to eliminate health disparities by ensuring equal access, creating partnerships with the community and healthcare facilities, promoting healthy lifestyles, and educating citizens on public health issues.
- Infectious Disease and Epidemiology conducts disease surveillance, responds to outbreaks, and provides health education.
