= Jane Hinton =

American scientist and veterinarian (1919–2003)

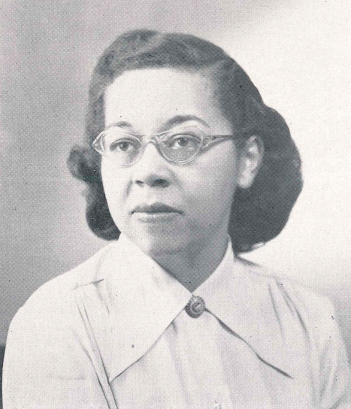
- Born: May 1, 1919
- Died: April 9, 2003 (aged 83)
- Education: University of Pennsylvania
- Known for: Codeveloper of Mueller–Hinton agar; Joint first African-American woman Doctor of Veterinary Medicine
- Father: William Augustus Hinton

Jane Hinton (May 1, 1919 – April 9, 2003) was a pioneer in the study of bacterial antibiotic resistance and one of the first two African-American women to gain the degree of Doctor of Veterinary Medicine (1949). Prior to her veterinary medicine studies at the University of Pennsylvania, she had been a laboratory technician at Harvard, codeveloping Mueller–Hinton agar, a culture medium that is now commonly used to test bacterial susceptibility to antibiotics. She later practiced as a small animal veterinarian in Massachusetts, and then as a federal government inspector investigating disease outbreak in livestock for the Department of Agriculture.

== Early life and education ==
Jane Hinton was born on May 1, 1919. Her father, William Augustus Hinton (1883–1959), was a bacteriologist and pathologist who was an expert in the diagnosis and treatment of syphilis, including the development of tests for syphilis. The son of former slaves, he was the first African-American professor at Harvard University and the first African-American author of a textbook. He entered laboratory medicine because racism in Boston prevented him from gaining an internship in medicine. Jane Hinton's mother was Ada Hawes (1878–1958), a Latin and English teacher at Tallahassee State College and social worker, born in Georgia. William and Ada married in 1909, and had two daughters, Jane and Ann Hinton Jones. As a child, Jane attended school in Europe, where her parents believed she would have the best education available as a black student. She returned to the United States to complete high school at Montpelier Seminary in Vermont in 1935, before earning her undergraduate degree at the age of 20 from Simmons College in 1939.

== Career ==
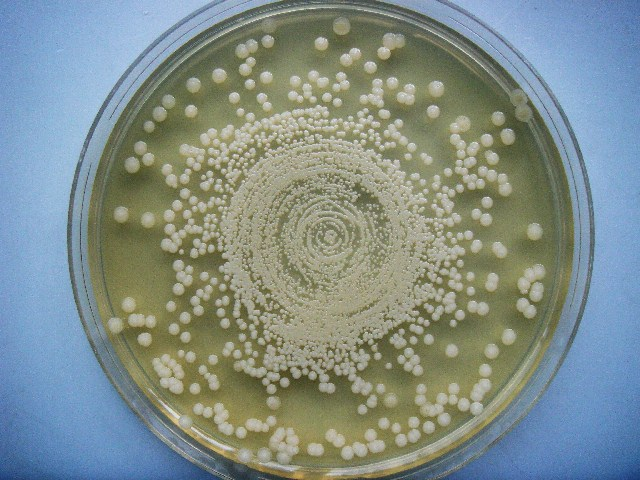
Colonies of Burkholderia pseudomallei on Mueller–Hinton agar after 72 hours incubation

Prior to her veterinary career, Jane Hinton worked in a laboratory in the Department of Bacteriology and Immunology at Harvard University, where she codeveloped Mueller–Hinton agar with John Howard Mueller. This agar was a medium developed to isolate the Neisseria bacteria that caused gonorrhea and meningococcal meningitis. Mueller and Hinton discovered that starch within the agar helped aid bacterial growth and prevented bacteria toxins from interfering with antibiotic testing. It became the most widely used culture medium for Neisseria. In the 1960s, tests indicated its suitability for detecting whether bacteria are susceptible to antibiotics. The Clinical and Laboratory Standards Institute, which establishes the best international laboratory standards, adopted the Kirby–Bauer technique using Mueller–Hinton agar as the gold standard for antibiotic testing.

During World War II, Hinton also worked as a lab technician in Arizona. After the War, Hinton studied veterinary medicine at the University of Pennsylvania, gaining her Doctor of Veterinary Medicine (VMD) degree in 1949. She and Alfreda Johnson Webb, who graduated with a VMD from the Tuskegee Institute (now Tuskegee University) that year, were the first African-American women veterinarians. There had been only four African-American VMD graduates at the University of Pennsylvania before Hinton gained her degree, and there would not be another until 1968. Hinton and Webb were also the first African-American members of the Women's Veterinary Medicine Association.

After gaining her degree, Hinton practiced as a small animal veterinarian in Canton, Massachusetts, and then a federal government inspector in Framingham, Massachusetts, where she worked to combat disease outbreaks in livestock.

Jane Hinton, together with John Taylor, the first African-American graduate of the University of Pennsylvania veterinary medicine school, were honored during the school's centennial celebrations by the Minority Veterinary Students association in 1984.

Jane Hinton retired in 1960 and died at the age of 84 on April 9, 2003.
