= Rhode Island State Health Laboratory =

Public health laboratory of Rhode Island

The Rhode Island State Health Laboratory (RISHL) is the public health laboratory of Rhode Island operated by the Rhode Island Department of Health.

The laboratory will be transitioning to a new facility in Providence in 2025. RISHL will occupy 80,000 sqft of the new 212,000 sqft building, with the remaining 130,000 sqft available for private laboratories and Brown University. The new building was designed by HoK at a cost of $165 million, with $82 Million funded by the CDC.
