= Hinton Laboratory =

State laboratory in Massachusetts, US

The William A. Hinton State Laboratory is a state laboratory in Massachusetts. It was known as the Massachusetts State Public Health Laboratory and Massachusetts State Laboratory Institute until 1975 when it was renamed for William A. Hinton. It houses the Massachusetts state drug lab.

The lab has produced various studies. The University of Massachusetts Medical School managed the lab until a scandal involving corruption of drug lab results used in criminal cases after which the lab reverted to state control. Tens of thousands of drug charges were dropped as a result of problems at the lab where lab techs engaged in criminal activity.
