= Oregon Department of Environmental Quality =

Agency overview
- Formed: 1969
- Preceding agency: Oregon State Sanitary Authority
- Headquarters: 700 NE Multnomah Street; Portland, Oregon
- Website: Department of Environmental Quality

The Oregon Department of Environmental Quality (DEQ) is the chief regulatory agency of the government of the U.S. state of Oregon responsible for protecting and enhancing the state's natural resources and managing sanitary and toxic waste disposal. The agency employs approximately 700 scientists, engineers, technicians, administrators, and environmental specialists. It has headquarters in Portland, regional administrative offices in Bend, Eugene, and Portland; and field offices in Coos Bay, Medford, Pendleton, Salem, and The Dalles. The Laboratory and Environmental Assessment Division operates an environmental laboratory in Hillsboro. The agency's director has the authority to impose fines for violations of the state's anti-pollution laws. In addition to its state mandate, the United States Environmental Protection Agency (EPA) has delegated authority to DEQ to administer federal environmental programs including the federal Clean Air Act, Clean Water Act, and Resource Conservation and Recovery Act within the state.

DEQ was established by the Oregon Legislative Assembly in 1969 when it dissolved its predecessor, the Oregon State Sanitary Authority, which was created in 1938 in response to public outcry for cleanup of the Willamette River. It administers the state's pollution laws, the first of which were enacted in 1889.

== See also ==
- Oregon Waste Systems, Inc. v. Department of Environmental Quality of Oregon
