= Mueller–Hinton agar =

Culture medium used in microbiology

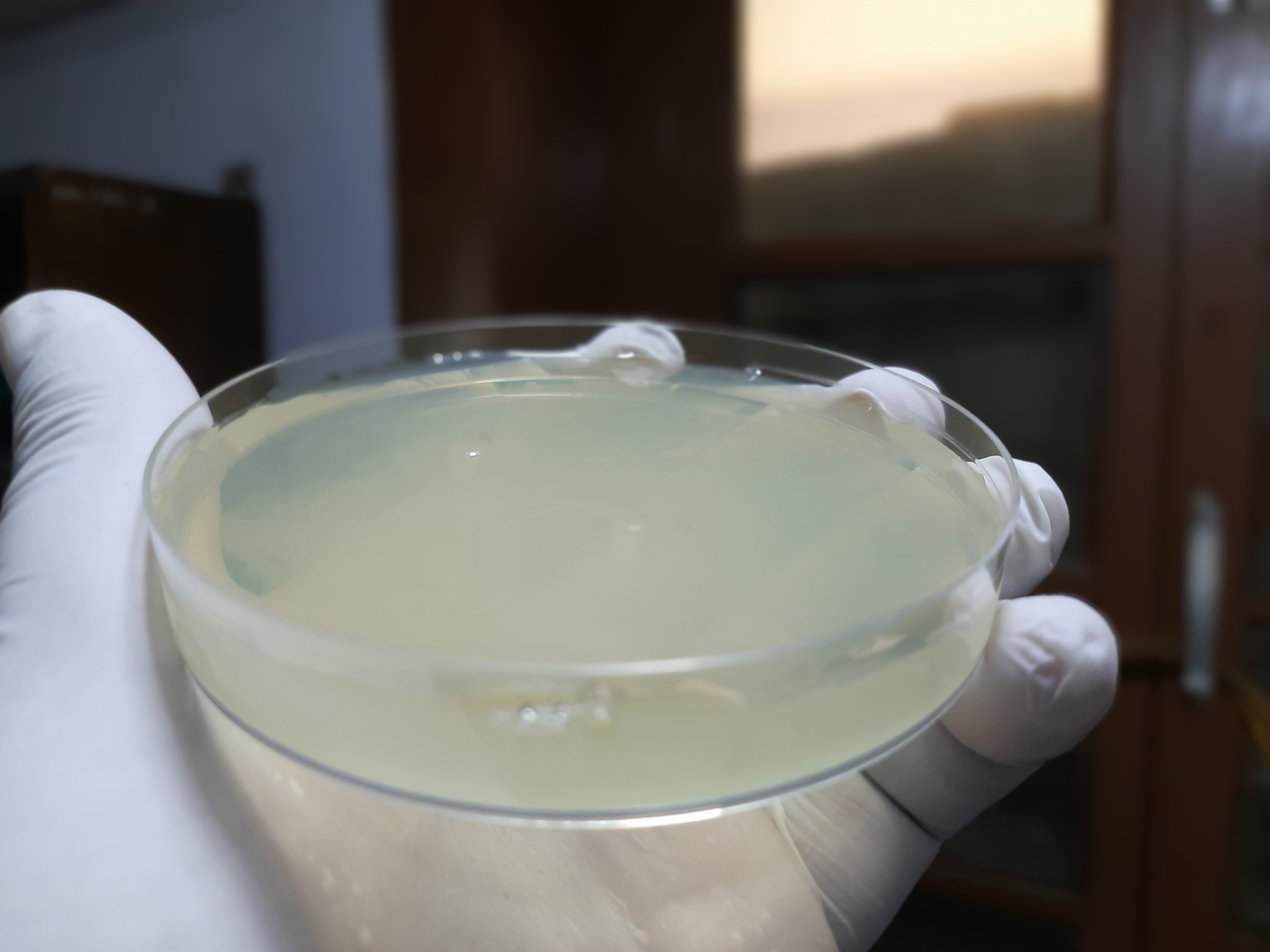
A Mueller-Hinton agar plate

Mueller–Hinton agar is a type of growth medium used in microbiology to culture bacterial isolates and test their susceptibility to antibiotics. This medium was first developed in 1941 by John Howard Mueller and Jane Hinton, who were microbiologists working at Harvard University. However, Mueller–Hinton agar is made up of a couple of components, including beef extract, acid hydrolysate of casein, and starch, as well as agar to solidify the mixture. The composition of Mueller–Hinton agar can vary depending on the manufacturer and the intended use, but the medium is generally nutrient-rich and free of inhibitors that could interfere with bacterial growth.

Mueller–Hinton agar is commonly used in the disk diffusion method, which is a simple and widely used method for testing the susceptibility of bacterial isolates to antibiotics. In this method, small disks impregnated with different antibiotics are placed on the surface of the agar, and the zone of inhibition around each disk is measured to determine the susceptibility of the bacterial isolate to that antibiotic. Mueller–Hinton agar is particularly useful for testing a wide range of antibiotics, as it has a low content of calcium and magnesium ions, which can interfere with the activity of certain antibiotics. For example, Mueller–Hinton agar may be used in the laboratory for the rapid presumptive identification of Candida albicans, as an alternative method for germ tube test. The medium is also free of inhibitors that could interfere with bacterial growth, making it a reliable and consistent substrate for bacterial cultures.

The composition of Mueller–Hinton agar can affect the growth characteristics of bacterial isolates, as well as their response to antibiotics. For example, variations in the pH of the medium can affect the activity of certain antibiotics, and the presence of certain nutrients can promote the growth of specific bacterial species. More so, careful selection and preparation of Mueller–Hinton agar is important for accurate microbiological assays. The use of Mueller–Hinton agar has been critical in the development of antibiotics and in the study of antibiotic resistance.

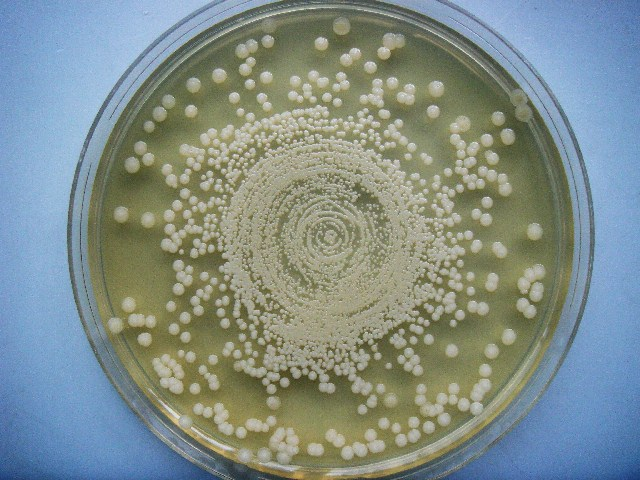
Colonies of Burkholderia pseudomallei on Mueller–Hinton agar after 72 hours incubation

Mueller–Hinton agar is a microbiological growth medium that is commonly used for antibiotic susceptibility testing, specifically disk diffusion tests. It is also used to isolate and maintain Neisseria and Moraxella species.

It typically contains:

- 2.0 g beef extract
- 17.5 g casein hydrolysate
- 1.5 g starch
- 17.0 g agar
- 1 liter of distilled water.
- pH adjusted to neutral at 25 °C.

Five percent sheep's blood and nicotinamide adenine dinucleotide may also be added when susceptibility testing is done on Streptococcus and Campylobacter species.

It has a few properties that make it excellent for antibiotic use. First of all, it is a nonselective, nondifferential medium. This means that almost all organisms plated on it will grow. Additionally, it contains starch. Starch is known to absorb toxins released from bacteria, so that they cannot interfere with the antibiotics. Second, it is a loose agar. This allows for better diffusion of the antibiotics than most other plates. A better diffusion leads to a truer zone of inhibition.

Mueller–Hinton agar was codeveloped by the microbiologist John Howard Mueller and the veterinary scientist Jane Hinton at Harvard University as a culture for gonococcus and meningococcus. They copublished the method in 1941.
