= Oregon PHL/DEQ Laboratories =

Public health laboratory of Oregon, US

Oregon State Public Health Laboratory Oregon DEQ Laboratory and Environmental Assessment Division
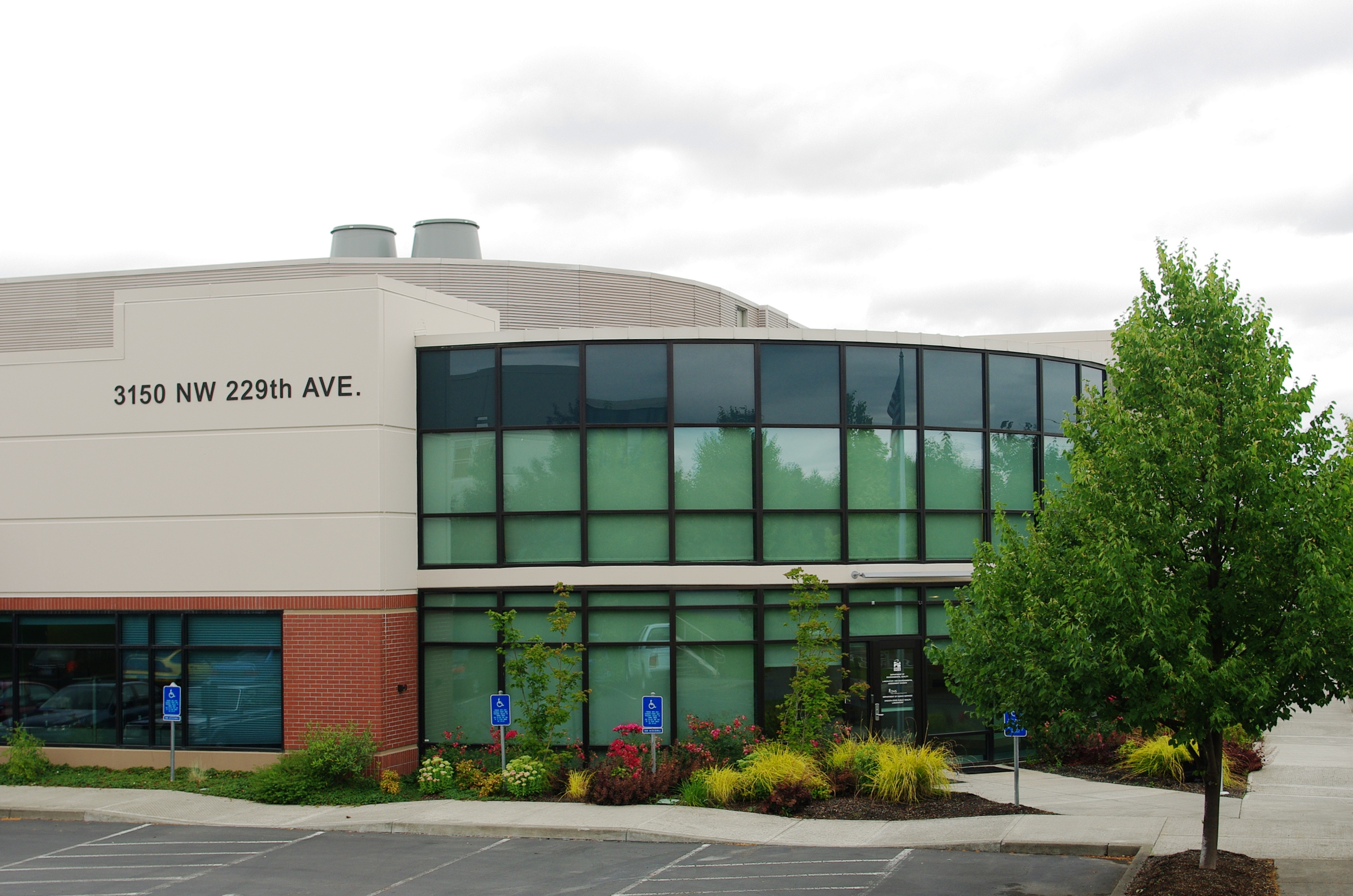
- Staff: DHS: 75; DEQ: 85
- Location: Hillsboro, Oregon, USA; 45°32′54″N 122°54′30″W
- Campus: 2 acres (0.0081 km^{2}); 86,000 square feet (8,000 m^{2})
- Operating agency: Oregon Department of Environmental Quality; Oregon Department of Human Services
- Website: DEQ Lab; OSPHL

The Oregon PHL/DEQ Laboratories are the Oregon Department of Environmental Quality (DEQ) and Oregon Health Authority (OHA) laboratories located in a single building in Hillsboro, Oregon, United States. OHA operates the Oregon State Public Health Laboratory (OSPHL), and the DEQ operates their Laboratory and Environmental Assessment Division at the site. The laboratories previously were located at Portland State University, moving to the new location near Cornelius Pass Road and the Sunset Highway (U.S. Route 26) in northeast Hillsboro in 2007.

Built at a cost of $35 million, the laboratories cover 86,000 square feet (8,000 m^{2}) on a 2-acre (0.81 ha) site. DEQ’s lab is an all hazards facility used primarily for testing air and water samples from around the state. The OSPHL operates a biosafety level 3 lab onsite. OSPHL includes a regional newborn screening program, and testing for and investigations of infectious diseases. The combined facility has around 180 employees.

== History ==
In 1903, the state government created the Oregon State Public Health Laboratory. The state created State Sanitary Authority in 1938 as part of the State Board of Health, with the Sanitary Authority becoming an independent agency in 1969 as the Department of Environmental Quality. Originally located at Portland State University in a converted parking garage, the Oregon Department of Human Services’s Public Health Laboratory and the laboratory of the Oregon Department of Environmental Quality began lobbying for a new facility in the 1990s. The old 50,000-square-foot (4,600 m^{2}) space had been remodeled in 1977 when the laboratories moved into the space, and was considered outdated and too small.

In response to agency efforts, Oregon’s 2002 to 2003 legislature passed an appropriations measure that authorized building a new facility to house the two laboratories. In September 2004, the Oregon Legislature’s Emergency Board approved $17.5 million in appropriations towards construction of the new laboratory. Officials hoped to move into a new facility by October 2006.

The month following the approval of funding, the Department of Administrative Services purchased a single-level building in Hillsboro’s Techpointe Commons business park near Cornelius Pass Road for $5.5 million to house the labs. They bought the 77,514-square-foot (7,201.3 m^{2}) building after the location passed the criteria set up for the facility of being within 30 miles (48 km) or 45 minutes of major Portland area hospitals, Portland International Airport, and Oregon Health & Sciences University. Built in 2002, the building had never been occupied and was sold by Schnitzer Investments. Construction on retrofitting the office space into laboratory facilities began in January 2005 by contractor Skanska USA. The new facility was designed by IDC Architects, part of CH2M Hill, who had to expand the facility from the 77,000-square-foot (7,200 m^{2}) building to better meet the agencies’ need for around 95,000 square feet (8,800 m^{2}) and convert it from light industrial use to the heavier uses needed by the labs.

In April 2006, the Emergency Board approved over $10 million more for the new facility’s construction and furnishings, with completion then scheduled for May 2007. Construction on the project was completed in December 2007, and the DEQ laboratory moved in later that month followed by the OSPHL in January. When it opened, the space had grown to 86,000 square feet (8,000 m^{2}) and cost a total of $35 million. The building was officially dedicated on January 10, 2008, with local officials such as Hillsboro mayor Tom Hughes and state legislators Mitch Greenlick and David Edwards in attendance. During the swine flu outbreak in 2009 the OSPHL tested samples from possible victims to determine if they had the H1N1 virus. This was a new capability of the new laboratory.

== Operations ==
Within the building are two main laboratories, a biosafety level 3 lab run by the OSPHL, and the DEQ’s all hazard lab. The former is used when dealing with highly contagious diseases or biological weapons, and is completely sealed off from the rest of the building. This means only special telephones are installed in the lab, and light bulbs can only be replaced from the roof. It also meets the standards promulgated by the U.S. Department of Homeland Security. The DEQ all hazards laboratory can be used if there are chemical weapons or biological weapons that need to be analyzed. The OSHPL uses 42,000 square feet (3,900 m^{2}) and has around 75 employees at the facility, while the DEQ has about 85 employees and uses 44,000 square feet (4,100 m^{2}).

Operations at the DEQ laboratory include testing of air and water samples from monitoring sites across Oregon, examining samples from polluted sites, testing samples of groundwater, and is responsible for testing compounds that are potential chemical weapons used by terrorists. The lab also tests fish, looking for contaminants. Tests by the DEQ examine samples by testing for items such as pharmaceuticals, mercury, pesticides, and other chemicals. The lab also serves as an accrediting agency in Oregon for laboratories that test environmental samples for drinking water, air, and soil.

The Health Lab is responsible for regulating other laboratories in Oregon and working to identify communicable diseases. This includes testing food, water, and dead animals to determine the source of outbreaks of diseases. The OSPHL also processes blood samples from all newborns from the state along with those from Hawaii, Alaska, Idaho, and Nevada in an effort to identify any possible disorders. For the newborn screening, they conduct 6.3 million tests each year. The lab is accredited by both the College of American Pathologists and the Center for Medicare and Medicaid Services.

== Facilities ==
Common spaces in the building such as a lunchroom, the entry, conference rooms, and several support areas, are shared by the two state agencies. Laboratory spaces are designed for flexibility and allow usage for a variety of tasks. The building met state energy efficiency standards, in part by using natural light in offices located along the exterior walls and by incorporating skylights for interior hallways. Other efficiency items include a high-efficiency boiler that can be controlled from Salem, a waterless urinal, and motion detectors in offices to turn off lights after periods of no usage.

For safety and security concerns, the building utilizes advanced exhaust systems and a closed circuit television system. In order to house the exhaust system on the light-industrial designed building, the entire roof had to be reinforced to hold 250,000 pounds (110,000 kg) of equipment. Other improvements to the building include new piping, additional wiring, a new ceiling, and the addition of mezzanines among other additions.
