= Health departments in the United States =

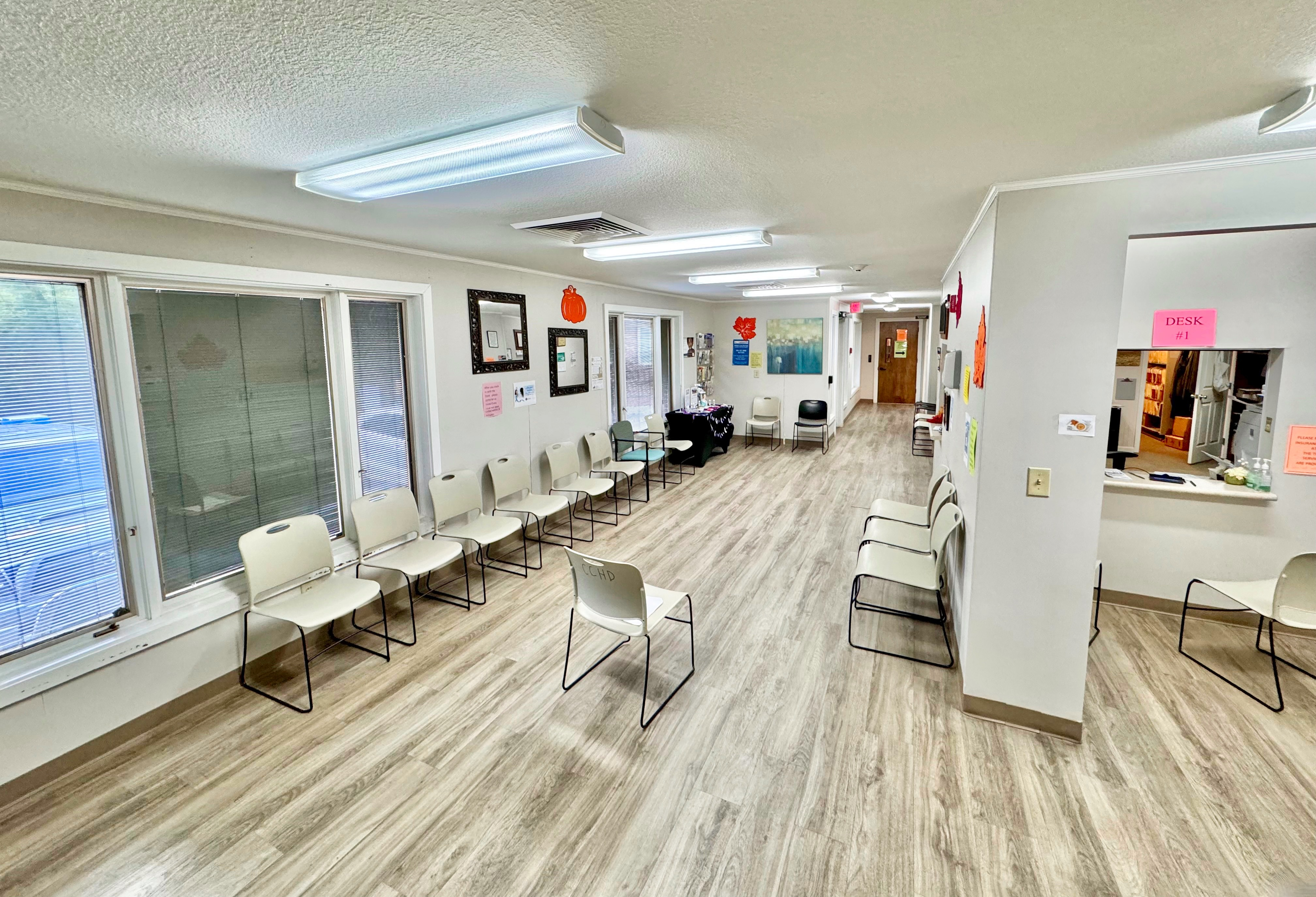
The waiting room of a local community public health department in the United States

Government departments responsible for health issues and health services in the United States exist at federal, state and local levels. The first, at city level, were founded in the late 18th century; now many operate at city or county level. State-level work began in the mid-19th century, now every state has one. The federal agency now known as the United States Department of Health and Human Services (HHS or Health Department) originated in 1939.

== Local ==
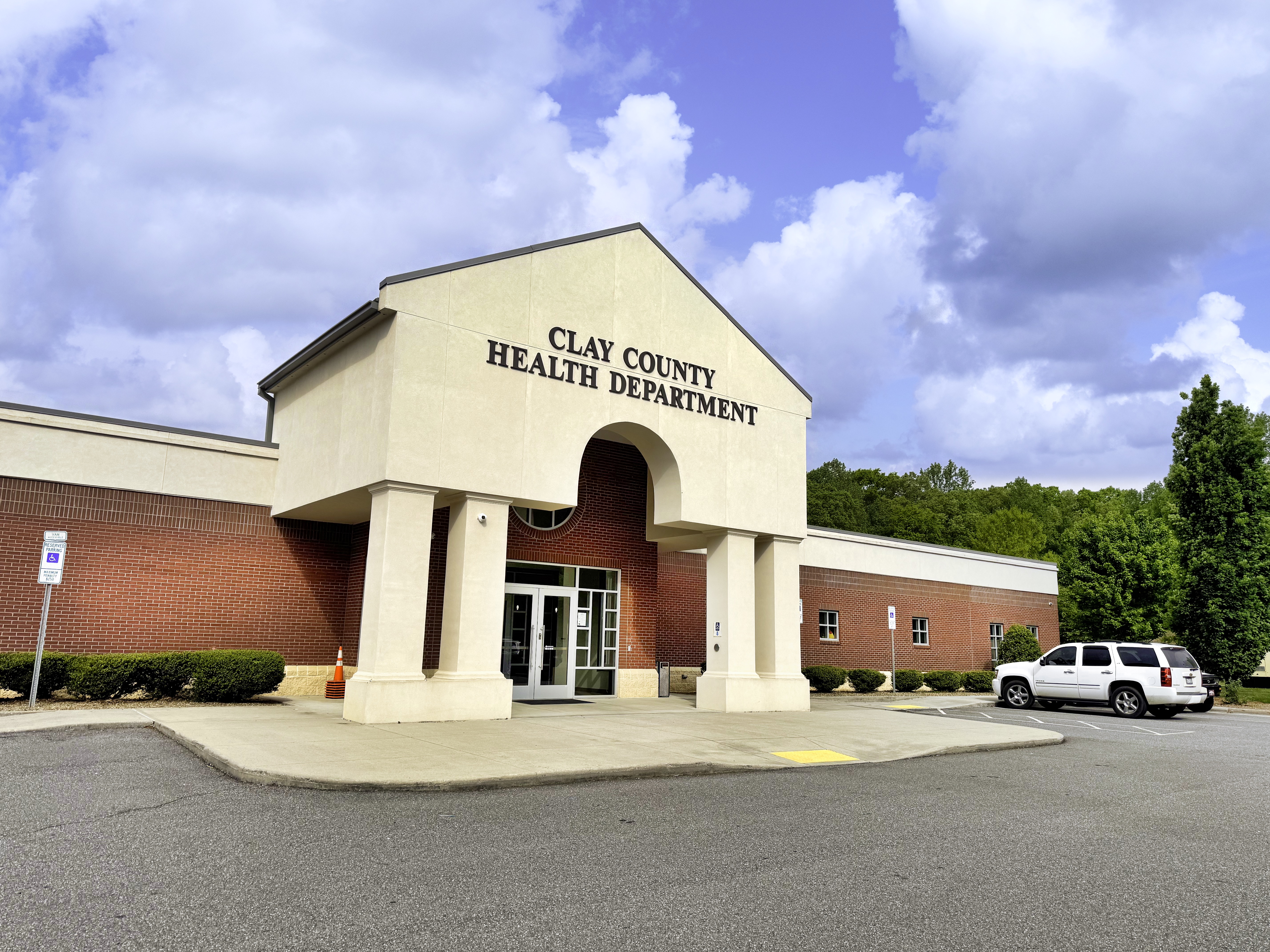
A county health department in North Carolina

Local health departments in the United States were the first health departments in the United States. There is some dispute at the local level as to the claim of being the first to establish a local board or health department. At least four cities claim to be the first health department in the United States. The city of Yakima, WA claims to be the oldest in the nation, established in 1911, the city of Petersburg, Virginia, claims it established the first permanent board of health in 1780. The city of Baltimore, Maryland, claims it established the first US health department in 1793, Philadelphia, Pennsylvania, followed 1794, claiming its Board of Health as "one of the first". And Boston, Massachusetts, claims in 1799 it established the first board of health and the first health department, with Paul Revere named as the first health officer.

Modern Local health departments may be entities of local or state government and often report to a mayor, city council, county board of health or county commission. There are approximately 3,489 local health departments across the United States.

Local health departments help create and maintain conditions in communities that support healthier choices in areas such as diet, exercise, and tobacco. They lead efforts that prevent and reduce the effects of chronic diseases, such as diabetes and cancer. They detect and stop outbreaks of diseases like measles, tuberculosis, and foodborne illnesses. They protect children and adults from infectious diseases through immunization. Local health departments also conduct programs that are shown to effectively make communities healthier. Some local health departments programs include:

- Helping ensure clean drinking water, access to safe and healthy foods, and children's safety through use of car seats.
- Enforcing laws and regulations that keep people safe (e.g. smoke-free air laws, restaurant inspections, water and sewer treatment).
- Tracking, investigating and stopping diseases and other public health threats (e.g. foodborne illness, HIV/AIDS).
- Developing emergency plans and responding to disasters when they strike (e.g. bioterrorism, hurricanes, floods, wildfires).
- Mobilizing community partners to work together to address local public health challenges (e.g. a lack of safe places for kids to play after school, limited access to fresh fruits and vegetables).
- Inspecting restaurants, community farmers’ markets, street fair vendors, and other venues where the public gathers to eat.
- Informing the public about health problems in the community and how to stay safe.

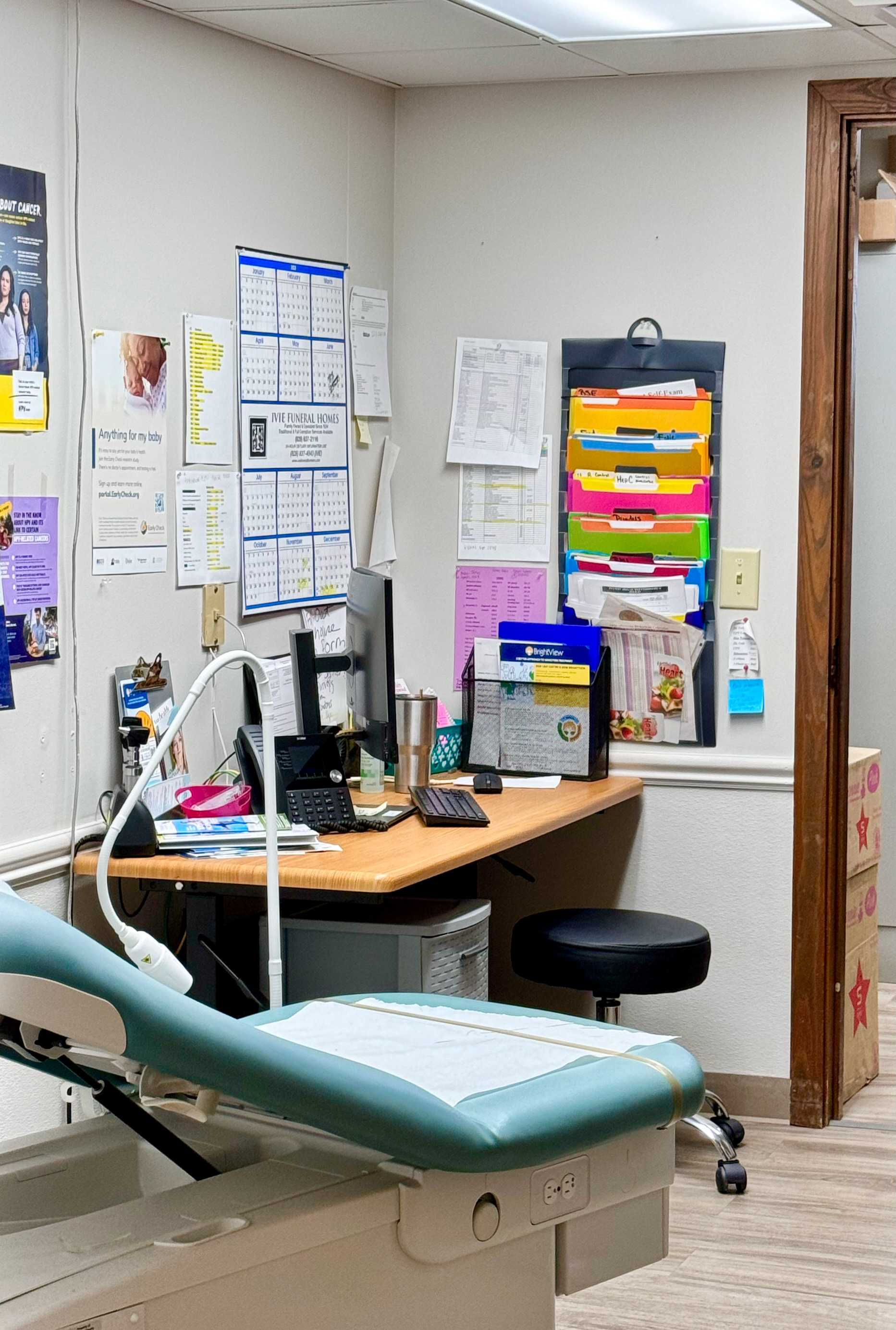
An exam room at a local community public health department in the United States

Local health departments play a central role in providing essential public health services in communities that fall into the following ten categories:

1. Monitor health status to identify and solve community health problems.
2. Diagnose and investigate health problems and health hazards in the community.
3. Inform, educate, and empower people about health issues.
4. Mobilize community partnerships and action to identify and solve health problems.
5. Develop policies and plans that support individual and community health efforts.
6. Enforce laws and regulations that protect health and ensure safety.
7. Link people to needed personal health services and assure the provision of healthcare when otherwise unavailable.
8. Assure competent public and personal healthcare workforce.
9. Evaluate effectiveness, accessibility, and quality of personal and population-based health services.
10. Research for new insights and innovative solutions to health problems.

== State ==
Each state health agency initially followed local moves to create health departments in each state. Louisiana was the first state to create a state board of health in 1855, but it functioned primarily to influence regulations in New Orleans. Massachusetts was the first to establish a state board that functioned throughout its state with statewide authority in 1869.

== Federal ==
At the national level, a simple National Board of Health functioned from 1879–1883. Not until 1939 was another federal agency established to manage public health on a national level. It went through several iterations, including a federal agency called the Federal Security Agency, which had health functions such as the United States Public Health Service (PHS), and the United States Food and Drug Administration (FDA). In 1953, that agency was reorganized and its health functions were elevated to a cabinet-level position to establish the United States Department of Health, Education and Welfare (HEW), which was renamed in 1980 to become the current and modern United States Department of Health and Human Services (HHS).

== Laws and regulations ==
HHS notes the laws and regulations that it carries out on its website. Every state also has a health department to which HHS has given a description and hyperlink for each state health department.

Other levels of government within each state are varied. For example, the California Department of Public Health (CDPH) has within it a health department in each of its 58 subdivisions called counties, but only four cities. One is in Berkeley: Berkeley Public Health Department. One is in San Francisco: the San Francisco Department of Public Health; and two are in Los Angeles County: the Long Beach Department of Health and Human Services and the Pasadena Public Health Department.

== See also ==
- State health agency
- National Association of County and City Health Officials
- History of public health in the United States
