= South Carolina Department of Environmental Services =

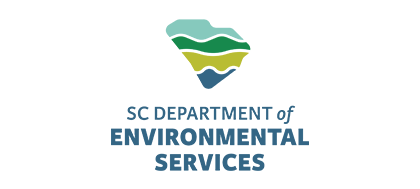
- SCDES Logo

Department overview
- Formed: July 1, 2024; 2 years ago
- Preceding Department: South Carolina Department of Health and Environmental Control
- Jurisdiction: Government of South Carolina
- Headquarters: Columbia, South Carolina
- Motto: Science, Service and Sustainability
- Annual budget: $200,310,049 (FY24-25)
- Department executive: Myra Reece, Director
- Website: des.sc.gov

The South Carolina Department of Environmental Services (SCDES) is a state cabinet agency which oversees the protection and preservation of South Carolina’s environment and natural resources.

== History ==
The department was created in 2024 when the South Carolina General Assembly split the former Department of Health and Environmental Control (DHEC) into two new departments: SCDES and the South Carolina Department of Public Health.
