= National Association of County and City Health Officials =

- Formation: 1960s
- Type: 501(c)(3) non-profit organization
- Purpose: Population health
- Headquarters: Washington, DC, United States
- Members: 2,800 local health departments
- Website: www.naccho.org

The National Association of County and City Health Officials (NACCHO) is a Washington, D.C.–based organization. These departments work to promote health and well-being for people through programs and services.

== Purpose ==
NACCHO provides leadership, up-to-date information, subject-matter expertise, and other resources, including:

- Community Health
- Environmental Health
- Public Health Infrastructure and Systems topics
- Public Health Preparedness

== History ==
The history of NACCHO dates to the 1960s, with the formation of the National Association of County Health Officials (NACHO), an independent affiliate of the National Association of Counties. NACHO combined with the U.S. Conference of Local Health Officers, an organization affiliated with the United States Conference of Mayors, to form the National Association of County and City Health Officials (NACCHO) in 1994. This unified organization represents counties, cities, city-counties, districts, and townships governmental local health departments. In 2001, NACCHO expanded its scope to include tribal public health agencies for reservation lands and, in 2012, to include counties and cities in the U.S. territories. As of 2020, NACCHO has about 2,800 local health departments.

== Governance ==
NACCHO is governed by a 27-member Board of Directors composed of elected health officials, a representative for Tribal health departments, and ex officio members representing the National Association of Counties, of which NACCHO is an affiliate, and the U.S. Conference of Mayors. The Board of Directors meets four times per year. The NACCHO Executive Committee includes four NACCHO officers and three Board members representing different geographic regions and population sizes. Approximately 380 NACCHO members serve on 40 committees and workgroups.
