= Illinois Department of Public Health =

State government agency of Illinois, U.S.

Department of Public Health

Department overview
- Formed: 1877; 149 years ago
- Jurisdiction: Illinois
- Headquarters: Springfield and Chicago
- Employees: 1,100
- Annual budget: $600 million in state and federal funds
- Department executive: Sameer Vohra, Director of Public Health
- Website: dph.illinois.gov

The Illinois Department of Public Health (IDPH) is the code department of the Illinois state government that prevents and controls disease and injury, regulates medical practitioners, and promotes sanitation.

== IDPH offices ==
The Illinois Department of Public Health consists of these offices:

- Office of the Director
- Office of Finance and Administration
- Office of Health Care Regulation
- Office of Health Promotion
- Office of Health Protection
- Office of Human Resources
- Office of Information Technology
- Office of Performance Management
- Office of Policy, Planning, and Statistics
- Office of Preparedness and Response
- Office of Women's Health

== List of directors ==
Directors of IDPH
Name	Dates	Notes
Sameer Vohra	2022–present	
Ngozi O. Ezike	2019–2022	
Nirav D. Shah	2015–2019	
LaMar Hasbrouck	2012–2015	
Damon T. Arnold	2007–2011	
Eric E. Whitaker	2003–2007	
John R. Lumpkin	1991–2003	
Bernard J. Turnock	1985–1990	
Thomas Kirkpatrick	1984–1985	
William Kempiners	1979–1984	
Paul Q. Peterson	1977–1978	
Joyce C. Lashof	1973–1977	
Franklin D. Yoder	1961–1973	
LeRoy L. Fatherree	1960–1961	
Roland R. Cross	1940–1959	
Albert C. Baxter	1937–1940	
Frank J. Jirka	1933–1937	
Andy Hall	1929–1933	
Issac D. Rawlings	1921–1929	
C. St. Clair Drake	1917–1921	

== See also ==
- COVID-19 pandemic in Illinois
- 2019–2020 vaping lung illness outbreak
- 2003 Midwest monkeypox outbreak
