= South Carolina Department of Public Health =

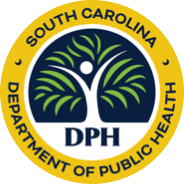
- SCDPH Logo

Department overview
- Formed: July 1, 2024; 2 years ago
- Preceding Department: South Carolina Department of Health and Environmental Control
- Jurisdiction: Government of South Carolina
- Headquarters: Columbia, South Carolina
- Employees: 2,900+
- Annual budget: $530,226,002 (FY24-25)
- Department executive: Edward Simmer, Interim Director
- Website: dph.sc.gov

The South Carolina Department of Public Health (DPH) is a South Carolina cabinet agency which coordinates disease control, supports healthy nutrition, responds to natural disasters, provides research and statistics on the state's health and environment.

== History ==
The department was created in 2024 when the South Carolina General Assembly split the former South Carolina Department of Health and Environmental Control (DHEC) into two new departments: DPH and the South Carolina Department of Environmental Services.
