= England constituency election results in the 1929 United Kingdom general election =

33rd Parliament	(1923)
34th Parliament	(1924)
35th Parliament	(1929)
36th Parliament	(1931)
37th Parliament	(1935)

Results of the election by constituency

This is a complete alphabetical list of election results from constituencies in England to the 35th Parliament of the United Kingdom at the 1929 general election, held on 30 May 1929.

== Notes ==
- Change in % vote and swing is calculated between the winner and second place and their respective performances at the 1924 election. A plus denotes a swing to the winner and a minus against the winner.

== A to E ==
Constituency	County	Region	Last election	Winning party				Turnout % (Note: Excludes spoilt ballots)	Votes								
Constituency	County	Region	Last election	Party	Votes	Share	Majority	Turnout %	Labour (Note: Includes Labour Party and allied Co-operative Party)		Conservative (Note: Excludes Speaker)		Liberal		Other (Note: Includes all other parties, all independent candidates and the Speaker)		Total
Constituency	County	Region	Last election	Party	Votes	Share	Majority	Turnout %	#	%	#	%	#	%	#	%	Total
Abingdon			Con	Con	14,094	47.4	2,198	80.8	3,712	12.5	14,094	47.4	11,896	40.1			29,702
Acrington			Lib	Lab	25,336	52.3	2,226	88.7	25,336	52.3			23,110	47.7			48,446
Acton			Con	Lab	13,206	41.4	467	75.5	13,206	41.4	12,739	39.9	5,981	18.7			31,926
Aldershot			Con	Con	15,123	59.3	9,139		4,389	17.2	15,123	59.3	5,984	23.5			25,496
Altrincham			Con	Con	28,512	50.7	10,037	80.8	9,242	16.4	28,512	50.7	18,475	32.9			56,229
Ashford			Con	Lib	15,753	46.0	1,174	75.3	3,885	11.4	14,579	42.6	15,753	46.0			
Ashton-under-Lyne			Con	Lab	13,170	44.4	3,407	85.9	13,170	44.4	9,763	33.0	6,693	22.6			
Aylesbury			Con	Con	20,478	48.1	2,884	78.7	4,509	10.6	20,478	48.1	17,594	41.3			
Balham and Tooting			Con	Con	18,181	45.2	4,682		13,499	33.6	18,181	45.2	8,533	21.2			
Banbury			Con	Con	16,444	45.5	2,644		5,894	16.3	16,444	45.5	13,800	38.2			
Barkston Ash			Con	Con	20,116	52.3	1,795		18,321	47.7	20,116	52.3					
Barnard Castle			Con	Lab	9,281	42.0	875		9,281	42.0	8,406	38.1	4,402	19.9			
Barnsley			Lab	Lab	21,855	53.8	9,338		21,855	53.8	6,265	15.4	12,517	30.8			
Barnstaple			Con	Con	17,382	45.9	789		3,864	10.2	17,382	45.9	16,593	43.9			
Barrow-in-Furness			Lab	Lab	19,798	56.0	4,247		19,798	56.0	15,551	44.0					35,349
Basingstoke			Con	Con	16,547	50.4	4,952	74.2	4,650	14.2	16,547	50.4	11,595	35.4			
Bassetlaw			Con	Lab	23,681	58.7	7,011		23,681	58.7	16,670	41.3					40,351
Bath			Con	Con	17,845	46.9	6,360	81.3	8,769	23.0	17,845	46.9	11,485	30.1			
Batley and Morley			Lib	Lab	24,621	58.3	6,980	84.1	24,621	58.3			17,641	41.7			
Battersea North			Com	Lab	13,265	37.8	2,432	69.7	13,265	37.8	10,833	30.8	4,513	12.9	6,554	18.6	
Battersea South			Con	Lab	18,113	43.9	418	72.5	18,113	43.9	17,695	42.8	5,516	13.3			
Bedford			Con	Con	16,724	46.0	6,204	79.1	9,147	25.1	16,724	46.0	10,520	28.9			
Bedfordshire Mid			Con	Lib	14,595	46.9	1,913	79.5	3,853	12.4	12,682	40.7	14,595	46.9			
Belper			Con	Lab	15,958	43.0	2,955	82.7	15,958	43.0	13,003	35.0	8,149	22.0			
Bermondsey West			Lab	Lab	13,231	60.2	8,366	66.6	13,231	60.2	3,852	17.6	4,865	22.2			
Berwick-upon-Tweed			Con	Con	12,526	42.8	1,154	76.1	5,402	18.4	12,526	42.8	11,372	38.8			
Bethnal Green North East			Lab	Lib	11,690	47.4	589	71.7	11,101	44.9	1,908	7.7	11,690	47.4			
Bethnal Green South West			Lib	Lib	8,109	45.9	1,260	64.1	6,849	38.7	1,365	7.7	8,109	45.9	1,368	7.7	
Bewdley			Con	Con	16,593	62.9	9,407	71.3	2,575	9.8	16,593	62.9	7,186	27.3			
Bilston			Lab	Lab	18,679	50.8	5,044		18,679	50.8	13,635	37.0	4,475	12.2			
Birkenhead East			Con	Lib	13,157	35.9	1,297	78.8	11,654	31.8	11,860	32.3	13,157	35.9			
Birkenhead West			Con	Lab	16,634	47.5	3,224		16,634	47.5	13,410	38.4	4,946	14.1			
Birmingham Aston			Con	Lab	18,672	52.2	1,558	78.3	18,672	52.2	17,114	47.8					
Birmingham Deritend			Con	Lab	16,932	50.7	2,767	70.6	16,932	50.7	14,165	42.5	2,268	6.8			
Birmingham Duddeston			Con	Lab	18,204	61.0	6,565		18,204	61.0	11,639	39.0					29,843
Birmingham Edgbaston			Con	Con	23,350	63.7	14,760		8,590	23.4	23,350	63.7	4,720	12.9			
Birmingham Erdington			Con	Lab	20,665	43.4	133		20,665	43.4	20,532	43.1	6,395	13.4			
Birmingham Handsworth			Con	Con	22,036	53.9	10,067		11,969	29.3	22,036	53.9	6,857	16.8			
Birmingham Kings Norton			Lab	Con	14,464	42.0	491	82.8	13,973	40.6	14,464	42.0	5,998	17.4			
Birmingham Ladywood			Con	Lab	16,447	50.0	11		16,447	50.0	16,436	50.0					32,883
Birmingham Moseley			Con	Con	33,820	56.7	18,087		15,733	26.4	33,820	56.7	9,388	15.7	675	1.1	59,616
Birmingham Sparkbrook			Con	Con	15,867	46.2	2,992		12,875	37.4	15,867	46.2	5,645	16.4			
Birmingham West			Con	Con	16,862	50.1	43		16,819	49.9	16,862	50.1					
Birmingham Yardley			Con	Lab	23,956	48.8	4,366	77.8	23,956	48.8	19,590	39.9	5,500	11.2			
Bishop Auckland			Lab	Lab	17,838	55.8	8,203	76.5	17,838	55.8	4,503	14.1	9,635	30.1			
Blackburn (2 seats)			Con	Lab	37,256	26.1		87.8	72,979	51.1	35,249	24.7	34,504	24.2			75,830
Blackburn (2 seats)			Lib	Lab	35,723	25.0	474	87.8	72,979	51.1	35,249	24.7	34,504	24.2			75,830
Blackpool			Con	Con	32,912	46.8	7,538	81.1	12,049	17.1	32,912	46.8	25,374	36.1			
Blaydon			Lab	Lab	21,221	59.1	13,374	79.5	21,221	59.1	7,847	21.8	6,878	19.1			
Bodmin			Con	Lib	16,002	46.3	914	84.9	3,437	10.0	15,088	43.7	16,002	46.3			
Bootle			Con	Lab	15,294	43.6	1,031	77.9	15,294	43.6	14,263	40.7	5,523	15.7			
Bosworth			Con	Lib	17,044	41.4	1,800		15,244	37.0	8,861	21.5	17,044	41.4			
Bournemouth			Con	Con	25,945	52.2	10,055		7,900	15.9	25,945	52.2	15,890	31.9			
Bow and Bromley			Lab	Lab	20,119	69.4	11,267	66.1	20,119	69.4	8,852	30.6					
Bradford Central			Con	Lab	24,876	59.0	7,611	80.0	24,876	59.0	17,265	41.0					
Bradford East			Lib	Lab	21,398	54.7	3,697	83.4	21,398	54.7			17,701	45.3			
Bradford North			Con	Lab	17,873	41.0	2,460	84.5	17,873	41.0	15,413	35.4	10,290	23.6			
Bradford South			Lab	Lab	23,251	48.9	10,972	23.1	23,251	48.9	12,059	25.3	12,279	25.8			
Brentford and Chiswick			Con	Con	14,025	48.5	3,107		10,918	37.8	14,025	48.5	3,957	13.7			
Bridgwater			Con	Con	15,440	46.8	4,279	80.4	6,423	19.4	15,440	46.8	11,161	33.8			
Brigg			Con	Lab	16,117	45.2	3,611		16,117	45.2	12,506	35.0	7,060	19.8			
Bristol Central			Con	Lab	20,749	55.7	4,225	11.3	20,749	55.7	16,524	44.3					
Bristol East			Lab	Lab	24,197	65.8	11,621	78.2	24,197	65.8			12,576	34.2			
Bristol North			Lib	Lab	18,619	48.7	5,687	78.1	18,619	48.7			6,713	17.5	12,932	33.8	
Bristol South			Lib	Lab	23,591	56.5	5,397	80.9	23,591	56.5			18,194	43.5			
Bristol West			Con	Con	25,416	53.7	13,455	77.7	11,961	25.3	25,416	53.7	9,909	21.0			
Brixton			Con	Con	14,252	44.9	4,163	62.4	10,089	31.7	14,252	44.9	7,438	23.4			
Bromley			Con	Con	25,449	47.2	7,077		10,105	18.7	25,449	47.2	18,372	34.1			
Broxtowe			Con	Lab	24,603	59.2	14,789	35.6	24,603	59.2	7,119	17.2	9,814	23.6			
Buckingham			Con	Con	16,375	45.8	4,657	79.6	11,718	32.7	16,375	45.8	7,713	21.5			
Buckrose			Con	Con	15,625	50.0	1,740	80.4	1,766	5.6	15,625	50.0	13,885	44.4			
Burnley			Lab	Lab	28,091	46.2	7,954		28,091	46.2	20.137	33.2	12,502	20.6			
Burslem			Con	Lab	20,288	58.7	12,848		20,288	58.7	7,440	21.5	6,815	19.7			
Burton			Con	Con	18,243	52.6	7,732		10,511	30.3	18,243	52.6	5,943	17.1			
Bury			Con	Con	14,845	42.2	1,670		13,175	37.4	14,845	42.2	7,160	20.4			
Bury St Edmunds			Con	Con	16,462	54.4	5,118	78.0	2,490	8.2	16,462	54.4	11,344	37.4			
Camberwell North			Lab	Lab	13,051	57.9	7,823	63.0	13,051	57.9	5,228	23.2	4,244	18.8			
Camberwell North-West			Con	Lab	12,213	44.2	2,405		12,213	44.2	9,808	35.6	5,559	20.2			
Camborne			Con	Lib	11,176	35.8	1,031	70.8	7,870	25.3	10,145	32.6	11,176	35.8	1,976	6.3	
Cambridge			Con	Con	13,867	43.2	3,751	79.8	10,116	31.5	13,867	43.2	8,124	25.3			
Cambridgeshire			Con	Con	13,306	37.6	2,050	74.7	11,256	31.7	13,306	37.6	10,904	30.7			
Cannock			Lab	Lab	26,388	54.2	11,333	23.3	26,388	54.2	15,055	30.9	7,282	14.9			
Canterbury			Con	Con	19,181	56.7	9,244	68.3	4,703	13.9	19,181	56.7	9,937	29.4			
Carlisle			Con	Lab	12,779	40.4	2,417	90.4	12,779	40.4	10,362	32.8	8,484	26.8			
Chatham			Con	Lab	13,007	42.6	786		13,007	42.6	12,221	40.1	5,284	17.3			
Chelmsford			Con	Con	17,094	43.8	4,060	75.1	8,910	22.8	17,094	43.8	13,034	33.4			
Chelsea			Con	Con	15,480	58.4	8,835	63.1	6,645	25.1	15,480	58.4	4,360	16.5			
Cheltenham			Con	Con	15,279	53.2	6,746	79.8	4,920	17.1	15,279	53.2	8,533	29.7			
Chertsey			Con	Con	21,433	55.6	4,288	63.5			21,433	55.6	17,145	44.4			
Chester			Con	Con	13,454	41.3	162	82.3	5,846	17.9	13,454	41.3	13,292	40.8			
Chesterfield			Lib	Lab	20,296	54.1	10,381	77.8	20,296	54.1	9,915	26.4	7,329	19.5			
Chester-le-Street			Lab	Lab	26,975	69.8	20,641		26,975	69.8	6,334	16.4	5,340	13.8			
Chichester			Con	Con	26,278	60.2	8,880	64.9			26,278	60.2	17,398	39.8			
Chippenham			Con	Con	13,550	46.6	1,731		3,717	12.8	13,550	46.6	11,819	40.6			
Chislehurst			Con	Con	16,909	53.8	7,884	69.6	5,445	17.4	16,909	53.8	9,025	28.8			
Chorley			Con	Con	19,728	45.6	1,359		18,369	42.4	19,728	45.6	5,207	12.0			
Cirencester and Tewkesbury			Con	Con	19,584	55.7	10,955	76.3	6,987	19.8	19,584	55.7	8,629	24.5			
Clapham			Con	Con	13,507	41.7	3,636	67.3	9,871	30.5	13,507	41.7	8,991	27.8			
Clay Cross			Lab	Lab	24,480	80.2	18,425		24,480	80.2	6,055	19.8					
Cleveland			Con	Lab	16,938	36.3	1,683		16,938	36.3	15,255	32.6	14,535	31.1			
Clitheroe			Con	Con	16,035	40.7	443	91.5	15,592	39.5	16,035	40.7	7,826	19.8			
Colchester			Con	Con	13,411	40.3	602		12,809	38.5	13,411	40.3	6,896	20.7	172	0.5	

Colne Valley
Party	Candidate	Votes	%	±%
Labour	Philip Snowden	21,667	48.3	
Unionist	Robert B. Carrow	12,532	28.0	
Liberal	Fred Brook	10,630	23.7	
Majority		9,135	20.3	
Turnout		44,829		
Labour hold		Swing		

Consett
Party	Candidate	Votes	%	±%
Labour	Herbert Dunnico	22,256	56.5	+0.6
Liberal	John Dickie	10,772	27.3	n/a
Unionist	John William Watts	6,400	16.2	n/a
Majority		11,484	29.2	+17.4
Turnout			80.1	−3.3
Labour hold		Swing	n/a	

North Cornwall
Party	Candidate	Votes	%	±%
Liberal	Donald Maclean	16,586	49.7	+3.3
Unionist	Alfred Martyn Williams	14,095	42.3	−11.3
Labour	F. E. Church	2,654	8.0	n/a
Majority		2,491	7.4	14.6
Turnout		33,335	86.1	+8.1
Liberal gain from Unionist		Swing	+7.3	

Coventry
Party	Candidate	Votes	%	±%
Labour	Philip Noel-Baker	34,255	49.4	
Unionist	Archibald Boyd-Carpenter	22,536	32.5	
Liberal	James Wiseman McKay	12,516	18.1	
Majority		11,719	16.9	
Turnout				
Labour gain from Unionist		Swing		

Crewe
Party	Candidate	Votes	%	±%
Labour	William Bowen	20,948	50.2	+5.7
Unionist	Donald Somervell	11,732	28.1	−27.4
Liberal	William Craven Llewelyn	9,076	21.7	n/a
Majority		9,216	22.1	33.1
Turnout			83.7	−1.9
Labour gain from Unionist		Swing	+16.5	

Croydon North
Party	Candidate	Votes	%	±%
Unionist	Glyn Mason	26,336	50.4	−19.9
Labour	Gilbert Arthur Foan	13,852	26.5	−3.2
Liberal	Cyril Walter Nunneley	12,053	23.1	+23.1
Majority		12,484	23.9	−16.7
Turnout		52,241		
Unionist hold		Swing	-8.3	

Croydon South
Party	Candidate	Votes	%	±%
Unionist	William Mitchell-Thomson	23,258	49.2	
Labour	E.W. Wilton	13,793	29.2	
Liberal	Albert Sigismund Elwell-Sutton	10,218	21.6	n/a
Majority		9,465	20.0	
Turnout				
Unionist hold		Swing		

Cumberland North
Party	Candidate	Votes	%	±%
Unionist	Fergus Graham	10,392	44.9	−9.3
Liberal	Richard Durning Holt	9,661	41.7	+6.8
Labour	C. A. O'Donnell	3,092	13.4	+2.5
Majority		731	3.2	−16.1
Turnout			83.7	−2.3
Unionist hold		Swing	-8.1	

Darlington
Party	Candidate	Votes	%	±%
Labour	Arthur Shepherd	17,061	44.0	−2.2
Unionist	Robert Stewart	15,596	40.2	−13.6
Liberal	John Joseph Richardson	6,149	15.8	n/a
Majority		1,465	3.8	11.4
Turnout			89.6	−3.5
Labour gain from Unionist		Swing	+5.7	

Dartford
Party	Candidate	Votes	%	±%
Labour	John Edmund Mills	26,871	50.6	+1.6
Unionist	Ashley Edwards	16,568	31.2	−19.8
Liberal	John Woolfenden Williamson	9,689	18.2	n/a
Majority		10,303	19.4	21.4
Turnout			76.9	−2.3
Labour gain from Unionist		Swing	+10.7	

Darwen
Party	Candidate	Votes	%	±%
Liberal	Herbert Samuel	15,714	40.9	+1.0
Unionist	Frank Sanderson	15,252	39.6	−3.4
Labour	Thomas Ramsden	7,504	19.5	+2.4
Majority		462	1.3	4.4
Turnout			92.3	
Liberal gain from Unionist		Swing	+2.2	

Daventry
Party	Candidate	Votes	%	±%
Speaker	Edward FitzRoy	unopposed	n/a	n/a
Speaker hold		Swing	n/a	

Deptford
Party	Candidate	Votes	%	±%
Labour	C. W. Bowerman	26,848	55.2	
Unionist	Ernest Gates	14,832	30.5	
Liberal	H. Charles Bevan	6,935	14.3	n/a
Majority		12,016	24.7	
Turnout				
Labour hold		Swing		

Derby (2 seats)
Party	Candidate	Votes	%	±%
Labour	J. H. Thomas	39,688	30.0	+4.3
Labour	William Raynes	36,237	27.4	+3.8
Unionist	Richard Luce	24,553	18.6	−5.2
Unionist	John Arthur Aiton	20,443	15.4	−4.9
Liberal	L. du Garde Peach	11,317	8.6	+2.0
Turnout		70,442	82.6	−2.6
Majority		11,684	8.8	9.0
Labour gain from Unionist		Swing	+4.5	
Labour hold		Swing		

Derbyshire North East
Party	Candidate	Votes	%	±%
Labour	Frank Lee	21,633	54.6	+9.7
Unionist	Rupert Eric Herbert Samuelson	9,167	23.1	−10.1
Liberal	Harry Briggs	8,861	22.3	+0.4
Majority		12,466	31.5	−19.8
Turnout			79.8	+1.3
Labour hold		Swing	+9.9	

Derbyshire South
Party	Candidate	Votes	%	±%
Labour	David Pole	25,101	47.4	+6.9
Unionist	James Augustus Grant	17,803	33.7	−10.6
Liberal	Ebenezer Josiah Johnson	9,998	18.9	+3.7
Majority		7,298	13.7	17.5
Turnout			83.4	+1.5
Labour gain from Unionist		Swing	+8.7	

Derbyshire West
Party	Candidate	Votes	%	±%
Unionist	Edward Cavendish	16,760	49.7	−7.2
Liberal	William Christopher Mallison	13,277	39.4	−3.7
Labour	William Wilkinson	3,660	10.9	n/a
Majority		3,483	10.3	−3.5
Turnout			83.2	−1.6
Unionist hold		Swing	-1.8	

Devizes
Party	Candidate	Votes	%	±%
Unionist	Percy Hurd	11,979	47.8	−13.1
Liberal	Eric Macfadyen	10,728	42.7	+3.6
Labour	R.P. Sheppard	2,391	9.5	n/a
Majority		1,251	5.1	−16.7
Turnout			77.5	+1.3
Unionist hold		Swing	-8.4	

Dewsbury
Party	Candidate	Votes	%	±%
Labour	Benjamin Riley	14,420	46.2	+5.1
Liberal	Ronald Walker	10,607	34.0	+6.2
Unionist	J W W Shuttleworth	6,175	19.8	−11.3
Majority		3,813	12.2	
Turnout			86.1	+1.8
Labour hold		Swing		

Don Valley
Party	Candidate	Votes	%	±%
Labour	Tom Williams	31,466	73.3	+19.4
Unionist	Walter Liddall	11,467	26.7	−19.4
Majority		19,999	46.6	+38.6
Turnout			69.7	−3.1
Labour hold		Swing	+19.4	

Doncaster
Party	Candidate	Votes	%	±%
Labour	Wilfred Paling	25,295	56.0	+3.3
Unionist	Ernest Albert Phillips	11,016	24.4	−22.9
Liberal	J. T. Clarke	8,842	19.6	n/a
Majority		14,279	31.6	26.2
Turnout			77.6	+0.6
Labour hold		Swing	+13.1	

East Dorset
Party	Candidate	Votes	%	±%
Liberal	Alec Glassey	17,810	42.2	+10.1
Unionist	Gordon Hall Caine	17,533	41.6	−11.0
Labour	Edward Joseph Stocker	6,819	16.2	+0.9
Majority		277	0.6	21.1
Turnout			81.5	+1.2
Liberal gain from Unionist		Swing	+10.5	

North Dorset
Party	Candidate	Votes	%	±%
Unionist	Cecil Hanbury	12,203	47.3	−6.0
Liberal	William Borthwick	11,281	43.8	−2.9
Labour	Colin Clark	2,298	8.9	n/a
Majority		922	3.5	−3.1
Turnout		25,782	81.4	−5.1
Unionist hold		Swing	-1.6	

Dorset South
Party	Candidate	Votes	%	±%
Unionist	Robert Gascoyne-Cecil	14,632	49.2	−21.3
Liberal	Cuthbert Plaistowe	8,168	27.5	n/a
Labour	Arthur William Wiltshire	6,950	23.4	−6.1
Majority		6,464	21.7	−19.3
Turnout		29,750	75.5	+9.4
Unionist hold		Swing	n/a	

Dorset West
Party	Candidate	Votes	%	±%
Unionist	Philip Colfox	12,247	49.1	−19.2
Liberal	George Edwin Chappell	7,921	31.8	n/a
Labour	Thomas Robins	4,770	19.1	−12.6
Majority		4,326	17.3	−19.3
Turnout			80.6	+7.4
Unionist hold		Swing	n/a	

Dover
Party	Candidate	Votes	%	±%
Unionist	John Jacob Astor	17,745	54.7	
Labour	Ernest Lionel McKeag	7,646	23.6	
Liberal	Herbert James Baxter	7,056	21.7	n/a
Majority		10,099	31.1	
Turnout				
Unionist hold		Swing		

Dudley
Party	Candidate	Votes	%	±%
Labour	Oliver Baldwin	13,551	47.6	−0.3
Unionist	Cyril Lloyd	10,508	36.9	−15.2
Liberal	Thomas Illingworth Clough	4,399	15.5	n/a
Majority		3,043	10.7	14.9
Turnout			81.6	+1.4
Labour gain from Unionist		Swing	+7.6	

Dulwich
Party	Candidate	Votes	%	±%
Unionist	Frederick Hall	15,009	48.8	
Labour	C. A. Smith	9,309	30.3	
Liberal	C. R. Cooke-Taylor	6,442	20.9	
Majority		5,700	18.5	
Turnout			72.1	
Unionist hold		Swing		

Durham
Party	Candidate	Votes	%	±%
Labour	Joshua Ritson	18,514	56.8	
Liberal	William McKeag	7,266	22.3	
Unionist	George Mervyn Anstey Hamilton-Fletcher	6,820	20.9	
Majority		11,248	34.5	
Turnout			80.1	
Labour hold		Swing		

Ealing
Party	Candidate	Votes	%	±%
Unionist	Herbert Nield	20,503	54.4	−18.9
Labour	James William Maycock	9,093	24.2	−2.5
Liberal	Arrean Paul Grundy	8,042	21.4	n/a
Majority		11,410	30.2	−16.4
Turnout			73.4	
Unionist hold		Swing	-8.2	

East Grinstead
Party	Candidate	Votes	%	±%
Unionist	Henry Cautley	21,940	57.9	−6.7
Liberal	Barbara Ellen Mary Bliss	9,718	25.6	+5.9
Labour	Thomas Crawford	6,265	16.5	+0.8
Majority		12,222	32.3	
Turnout			68.5	−1.7
Unionist hold		Swing		

East Ham North
Party	Candidate	Votes	%	±%
Labour	Susan Lawrence	13,969	42.1	+6.3
Unionist	John Lees-Jones	11,805	35.5	−4.1
Liberal	Thomas Arnold Evans	7,459	22.4	−2.2
Majority		2,164	6.6	
Turnout		33,233	72.0	−4.5
Labour gain from Unionist		Swing		

East Ham South
Party	Candidate	Votes	%	±%
Labour	Alfred Barnes	18,956	54.3	+2.4
Unionist	Hubert Duggan	8,854	25.4	n/a
Liberal	Edward Maynard Coningsby Denney	7,085	20.3	−27.8
Majority		10,102	28.9	
Turnout			73.8	−2.1
Labour hold		Swing	n/a	

Eastbourne
Party	Candidate	Votes	%	±%
Unionist	Edward Marjoribanks	18,157	49.9	−18.0
Labour	R S Chatfield	8,204	22.5	+6.5
Liberal	Clive Stuart Saxon Burt	7,812	21.4	5.3
Ind. Unionist	P.E. Hurst	2,277	6.2	n/a
Majority		9,953	27.4	−24.4
Turnout		36,450	74.5	−3.1
Unionist hold		Swing	-12.2	

Eccles
Party	Candidate	Votes	%	±%
Labour	David Mort	20,489	49.8	+3.2
Unionist	Albert Bethel	12,232	29.8	−23.3
Liberal	Handel Wilde	8,374	20.4	n/a
Majority		8,257	20.0	26.5
Labour gain from Unionist				

Eddisbury
Party	Candidate	Votes	%	±%
Liberal	R. J. Russell	13,688	51.6	+5.7
Unionist	Roderick George Fenwick-Palmer	12,862	48.4	−5.7
Majority		826	3.2	11.4
Turnout			86.8	+6.2
Liberal gain from Unionist		Swing	+5.7	

Edmonton
Party	Candidate	Votes	%	±%
Labour	Frank Broad	17,555	59.3	
Unionist	George Jarrett	12,044	40.7	
Majority		5,511	18.6	
Turnout		29,599		
Labour hold		Swing		

Elland
Party	Candidate	Votes	%	±%
Labour	Charles Buxton	17,012	43.7	+4.2
Unionist	Sam Howard	11,150	28.7	9.1
Liberal	William Haughton Sessions	10,734	27.6	+4.9
Majority		5,862	15.0	+13.3
Turnout			83.6	−0.5
Labour hold		Swing	+6.6	

Enfield
Party	Candidate	Votes	%	±%
Labour	William Henderson	14,427	43.3	−2.7
Unionist	Reginald Applin	14,169	42.5	−11.5
Liberal	Charles Herbert Durrad-Lang	4,736	14.2	n/a
Majority		258	0.8	8.8
Turnout			78.5	−3.3
Labour gain from Unionist		Swing	+4.4	

Epping
Party	Candidate	Votes	%	±%
Unionist	Winston Churchill	23,972	48.5	−10.4
Liberal	Gilbert Granville Sharp	19,005	38.4	+8.5
Labour	Walton Newbold	6,472	13.1	+1.9
Majority		4,967	10.1	−18.9
Turnout			75.2	−3.1
Unionist hold		Swing	-9.5	

Epsom
Party	Candidate	Votes	%	±%
Unionist	Archibald Southby	24,720	57.8	−21.7
Liberal	Samuel Parnell Kerr	10,422	24.3	n/a
Labour	Stanley James Wells Morgan	7,662	17.9	−2.6
Majority		14,298	33.5	−25.5
Turnout			67.7	−0.6
Unionist hold		Swing	n/a	

Essex South East
Party	Candidate	Votes	%	±%
Labour	Jack Oldfield	18,756	37.6	
Unionist	Herbert Looker	18,130	36.3	
Liberal	George Thomas Veness	13,030	26.1	n/a
Majority		626	1.3	
Turnout				
Labour gain from Unionist		Swing		

Evesham
Party	Candidate	Votes	%	±%
Unionist	Bolton Eyres-Monsell	14,694	48.4	−18.1
Liberal	Selick Davies	11,519	38.0	+20.8
Labour	Robert Aldington	4,138	13.6	−3.7
Majority		3,175	10.4	−37.8
Turnout			76.4	+10.0
Unionist hold		Swing	-19.5	

Exeter
Party	Candidate	Votes	%	±%
Ind. Unionist	Robert Newman	16,642	49.5	−8.0
Labour	J. Lloyd Jones	9,361	27.8	+2.6
Unionist	Geoffrey Dorling Roberts	7,622	22.7	n/a
Majority		7,281	21.7	−10.6
Turnout			81.9	−0.2
Ind. Unionist gain from Unionist		Swing	n/a	

Eye
Party	Candidate	Votes	%	±%
Liberal	Edgar Granville	13,944	44.2	+14.7
Unionist	Arthur Gilstrap Soames	12,880	40.8	−12.5
Labour	Owen Aves	4,709	14.9	−2.3
Majority		1,064	3.4	27.2
Turnout		31,533		
Liberal gain from Unionist		Swing	+13.6	

== F to K ==
Constituency	County	Region	Last election	Winning party				Turnout	Votes								
Constituency	County	Region	Last election	Party	Votes	Share	Majority	Turnout	Labour		Conservative		Liberal		Other		Total
Constituency	County	Region	Last election	Party	Votes	Share	Majority	Turnout	#	%	#	%	#	%	#	%	Total
Fareham			Con	Con	19,756	54.2	11,126		8,034	22.1	19,756	54.2	8,630	23.7			
Farnham			Con	Con	21,050	59.8	11,782		4,866	13.8	21,050	59.8	9,268	26.3			
Farnworth			Lab	Lab	21,857	52.2	11,214		21,857	52.2	10,643	25.4	9,381	22.4			

Faversham
Party	Candidate	Votes	%	±%
Unionist	Adam Maitland	16,219	41.3	−5.6
Labour	Dudley Aman	15,275	38.9	+9.0
Liberal	Maurice Alfred Gerothwohl	7,782	19.8	−3.4
Majority		944	2.4	−14.6
Turnout			75.5	+1.6
Unionist hold		Swing	-7.3	

Finchley
Party	Candidate	Votes	%	±%
Unionist	Edward Cadogan	18,920	48.8	−9.5
Liberal	T. Atholl Robertson	14,065	36.2	−5.5
Labour	J. George Stone	5,824	15.0	n/a
Majority		4,855	12.6	−4.0
Turnout		38,809	77.2	−2.3
Unionist hold		Swing	-2.0	

Finsbury
Party	Candidate	Votes	%	±%
Labour	George Gillett	17,970	56.5	+9.5
Unionist	William Ray	9,026	28.3	−15.9
Liberal	William John Pinard	4,855	15.2	+6.4
Majority		8,944	28.2	+25.4
Turnout		31,851	66.0	−0.3
Labour hold		Swing	+12.7	

Forest of Dean
Party	Candidate	Votes	%	±%
Labour	David Vaughan	13,976	52.1	
Unionist	William Cotts	7,092	26.5	
Liberal	Joseph W. Westwood	5,738	21.4	
Majority		6,884	25.6	
Turnout				
Labour hold		Swing		

Frome
Party	Candidate	Votes	%	±%
Labour	Frederick Gould	18,524	45.5	
Unionist	Geoffrey Peto	16,378	40.3	
Liberal	Colin Stratton-Hallett	5,774	14.2	
Majority		2,146	5.2	
Turnout				
Labour gain from Unionist		Swing		

Fulham East
Party	Candidate	Votes	%	±%
Unionist	Kenyon Vaughan-Morgan	15,130	44.3	−17.3
Labour	John Palmer	13,425	39.4	+1.0
Liberal	John Henry Greenwood	5,551	16.3	n/a
Majority		1,705	4.9	18.3
Turnout			66.8	−2.3
Unionist hold		Swing	-9.1	

Fulham West
Party	Candidate	Votes	%	±%
Labour	Ernest Spero	16,190	44.9	+4.3
Unionist	Cyril Cobb	13,979	38.7	−20.7
Liberal	George Arthur Gale	5,920	16.4	n/a
Majority		2,211	6.2	25.0
Turnout		36,089	71.4	+0.1
Labour gain from Unionist		Swing	+12.5	

Fylde
Party	Candidate	Votes	%	±%
Unionist	Edward Stanley	29,894	64.7	
Labour	Joseph Williamson	16,318	35.3	
Majority		13,576	29.4	
Turnout		46,212		
Unionist hold		Swing		

Gainsborough
Party	Candidate	Votes	%	±%
Unionist	Harry Crookshank	10,058	37.1	−10.0
Liberal	Arthur Neal	9,991	36.9	+11.3
Labour	George Deer	7,032	26.0	−1.3
Majority		67	0.2	−21.3
Turnout				
Unionist hold		Swing	-10.7	

Gateshead
Party	Candidate	Votes	%	±%
Labour	James Melville	28,393	52.6	+2.4
Unionist	Ian Orr-Ewing	11,644	21.5	−8.7
Liberal	John Fennell	10,314	19.1	−0.5
Independent Liberal	John Leonard Watson	3,688	6.8	n/a
Majority		16,749	31.1	+11.1
Turnout			73.9	−8.8
Labour hold		Swing		

Gillingham
Party	Candidate	Votes	%	±%
Unionist	Robert Gower	13,612	47.5	
Labour	George Pearce Blizard	11,207	39.1	
Liberal	R Ronald Tyrer	3,856	13.4	
Majority		2,405	8.4	
Turnout				
Unionist hold		Swing		

Gloucester
Party	Candidate	Votes	%	±%
Unionist	Leslie Boyce	11,041	39.2	
Labour	Henry Nixon	10,548	37.4	
Liberal	Thomas Worrall Casey	6,589	23.4	
Majority		493	1.8	
Turnout				
Unionist hold		Swing		

Grantham
Party	Candidate	Votes	%	±%
Unionist	Victor Warrender	16,121	40.8	−8.7
Liberal	R Hamilton Brown	12,023	30.4	+4.4
Labour	Montague William Moore	11,340	28.7	+4.2
Majority		4,098	10.3	−13.2
Turnout			81.9	+1.5
Unionist hold		Swing	-6.6	

Gravesend
Party	Candidate	Votes	%	±%
Unionist	Irving Albery	14,644	46.1	−12.3
Labour	William James Humphreys	12,871	40.6	−1.0
Liberal	Frederick William Kershaw	4,220	13.3	n/a
Majority		1,773	5.5	−13.3
Turnout		31,735	71.8	−6.2
Unionist hold		Swing	−5.7	

Great Yarmouth
Party	Candidate	Votes	%	±%
Liberal	Arthur Harbord	13,147	43.7	+3.2
Unionist	Frank Meyer	11,570	38.5	−6.6
Labour	George Francis Johnson	5,347	17.8	+3.4
Majority		1,577	5.2	9.8
Turnout			83.1	+3.2
Liberal gain from Unionist		Swing	+4.9	

Greenwich
Party	Candidate	Votes	%	±%
Labour	Edward Timothy Palmer	20,328	46.3	−2.2
Unionist	George Hume	16,710	38.1	−13.4
Liberal	W P Campbell	6,870	15.6	n/a
Majority		3,618	8.2	11.2
Turnout		43,908	70.4	−4.8
Labour gain from Unionist		Swing	+5.6	

Grimsby
Party	Candidate	Votes	%	±%
Unionist	Walter Womersley	27,001	54.8	+3.4
Labour	Ernest Marklew	22,254	45.2	+9.6
Majority		4,747	9.6	−6.2
Turnout			71.9	−4.5
Unionist hold		Swing	-3.1	

Guildford
Party	Candidate	Votes	%	±%
Unionist	Henry Buckingham	20,550	48.3	−14.0
Liberal	Somerset Stopford Brooke	15,984	37.6	+21.1
Labour	Lawrence Miles Worsnop	5,996	14.1	−7.1
Majority		4,566	10.7	−30.4
Turnout			72.1	+0.8
Unionist hold		Swing	-17.6	

Hackney Central
Party	Candidate	Votes	%	±%
Labour	Fred Watkins	12,462	37.3	+1.0
Unionist	Alfred Bossom	10,814	32.3	−10.4
Liberal	Leonard Franklin	10,186	30.4	+9.4
Majority		1,648	5.0	11.4
Turnout		33,462	70.0	−4.2
Labour gain from Unionist		Swing	+5.7	

Hackney North
Party	Candidate	Votes	%	±%
Unionist	Austin Hudson	11,199	35.7	−11.7
Labour	Frank Bowles	10,333	32.9	+8.7
Liberal	John Harris	9,844	31.4	+3.0
Majority		866	2.8	21.8
Unionist hold		Swing	-10.2	

Hackney South
Party	Candidate	Votes	%	±%
Labour	Herbert Morrison	15,590	51.2	+4.7
Unionist	Tresham Lever	8,222	27.0	n/a
Liberal	Muriel Morgan Gibbon	6,302	20.7	−32.8
Communist	J. T. Murphy	331	1.1	n/a
Majority		7,368	24.2	+31.2
Labour gain from Liberal				

Halifax
Party	Candidate	Votes	%	±%
Labour	Arthur Longbottom	23,776	42.2	n/a
Unionist	Gilbert Gledhill	16,713	29.7	n/a
Liberal	Elliott Dodds	15,823	28.1	n/a
Majority		7,063	12.5	n/a
Turnout		56,312	81.3	n/a
Labour gain from Liberal		Swing		

Hammersmith North
Party	Candidate	Votes	%	±%
Labour	James Patrick Gardner	17,601	56.2	+10.3
Unionist	Marshall Hays	13,744	43.8	−10.3
Majority		3,857	12.3	20.6
Turnout		31,345	70.0	
Labour gain from Unionist		Swing	+10.3	

Hammersmith South
Party	Candidate	Votes	%	±%
Labour	Daniel Chater	12,630	43.8	+5.3
Unionist	John Ferguson	12,218	42.4	−13.0
Liberal	J J Davies	3,976	13.8	+7.7
Majority		412	1.4	18.3
Turnout			67.3	−5.0
Labour gain from Unionist		Swing	+9.1	

Hampstead
Party	Candidate	Votes	%	±%
Unionist	George Balfour	23,370	58.3	−20.8
Labour	F. E. Dawkins	8,473	21.1	+0.2
Liberal	M. Leon Freedman	8,273	20.6	n/a
Majority		14,897	37.1	−21.1
Turnout		40,116	62.8	−4.4
Unionist hold		Swing	-10.5	

Hanley
Party	Candidate	Votes	%	±%
Labour	Arthur Hollins	20,785	62.0	+9.0
Unionist	Eric Errington	9,022	26.9	−20.1
Liberal	Charles Frederick White	3,696	11.0	n/a
Majority		11,763	35.1	+29.1
Turnout				
Labour hold		Swing	+14.5	

Harborough
Party	Candidate	Votes	%	±%
Unionist	Arthur Stewart	16,164	41.8	−10.8
Labour	Frederick Wise	12,620	32.7	+8.4
Liberal	George Nicholls	9,846	25.5	+2.4
Majority		3,544	9.1	−19.2
Turnout			81.9	+0.9
Unionist hold		Swing	-9.6	

Harrow
Party	Candidate	Votes	%	±%
Unionist	Isidore Salmon	22,466	42.7	
Labour	Hubert Beaumont	15,684	29.8	
Liberal	Clement Edward Page Taylor	12,554	23.8	
Independent	W.J. Sholl	1,965	3.7	n/a
Majority		6,782	12.9	
Turnout		52,669		
Unionist hold		Swing		

Harwich
Party	Candidate	Votes	%	±%
Liberal	John Pybus	16,309	52.8	+11.1
Unionist	John Mayhew	13,609	44.1	−7.4
Ind. Unionist	J Elliott	946	3.1	n/a
Majority		2,700	8.7	18.5
Turnout			76.3	−2.7
Liberal gain from Unionist		Swing	+9.5	

The Hartlepools
Party	Candidate	Votes	%	±%
Unionist	W. G. Howard Gritten	17,271	38.0	−11.5
Liberal	Stephen Furness	17,133	37.7	−3.1
Labour	Gilbert Oliver	11,052	24.3	+14.6
Majority		138	0.3	8.4
Turnout			85.9	−4.4
Unionist hold		Swing	-4.2	

Hastings
Party	Candidate	Votes	%	±%
Unionist	Eustace Percy	15,928	52.3	−19.1
Liberal	Thomas Austen Edwin Spearing	8,004	26.3	n/a
Labour	Basil Noble	6,516	21.4	−7.2
Majority		7,924	26.0	−16.8
Turnout			73.4	
Unionist hold		Swing	n/a	

Hemel Hempstead
Party	Candidate	Votes	%	±%
Unionist	J. C. C. Davidson	15,145	49.8	−7.8
Liberal	Charles Thomas Le Quesne	11,631	38.3	+2.8
Labour	Albert E.R. Millar	3,624	11.9	+5.0
Majority		3,514	11.5	−10.6
Turnout			78.0	−2.2
Unionist hold		Swing	-5.3	

Hemsworth
Party	Candidate	Votes	%	±%
Labour	John Guest	26,075	79.9	+10.6
Unionist	R. A. Broughton	6,578	20.1	−10.6
Majority		19,497	59.8	+21.3
Turnout		32,653	75.8	+6.1
Labour hold		Swing	+10.6	

Hendon
Party	Candidate	Votes	%	±%
Unionist	Philip Cunliffe-Lister	31,758	52.3	
Labour	Robert Lyons	15,434	25.5	
Liberal	Margery Corbett Ashby	13,449	22.2	
Majority		16,324	26.8	
Turnout			72.0	
Unionist hold		Swing		

Henley
Party	Candidate	Votes	%	±%
Unionist	Robert Henderson	16,943	51.9	−12.9
Liberal	Geoffrey Ernest Tritton	9,786	29.9	+5.3
Labour	Bernard Benjamin Gillis	5,962	18.2	n/a
Majority		7,157	22.0	−18.2
Turnout		32,691	73.3	+3.1
Unionist hold		Swing	-9.1	

Hereford
Party	Candidate	Votes	%	±%
Liberal	Frank Owen	14,208	48.7	+9.3
Unionist	Frederic Romilly	13,087	44.8	−15.8
Labour	Henry Cooper	1,901	6.5	n/a
Majority		1,121	3.9	25.1
Turnout			78.9	
Liberal gain from Unionist		Swing	+12.6	

Hertford
Party	Candidate	Votes	%	±%
Unionist	Murray Sueter	13,525	39.5	−20.5
Independent	Noel Pemberton Billing	10,149	29.6	n/a
Liberal	Thomas Evander Evans	6,419	18.7	−5.3
Labour	Roger S Edwards	4,193	12.2	−3.8
Majority		3,376	9.9	−26.1
Turnout			74.7	+3.9
Unionist hold		Swing	n/a	

Hexham
Party	Candidate	Votes	%	±%
Unionist	Douglas Clifton Brown	11,069	39.1	−8.9
Liberal	Francis Dyke Acland	9,103	32.2	+2.9
Labour	Ernest Owen Dunnico	8,135	28.7	+6.0
Majority		1,966	6.9	−11.8
Turnout			80.2	−2.0
Unionist hold		Swing	-5.9	

Heywood and Radcliffe
Party	Candidate	Votes	%	±%
Liberal	Abraham England	22,692	52.2	−3.4
Labour	Arthur Creech Jones	20,745	47.8	+3.4
Majority		1,947	4.4	−6.8
Turnout			79.3	−1.7
Liberal hold		Swing	-3.4	

High Peak
Party	Candidate	Votes	%	±%
Unionist	Alfred Law	16,406	43.1	−10.2
Liberal	Robert McDougall	11,083	29.1	−17.6
Labour	George Bagnall	10,567	27.8	n/a
Majority		5,323	14.0	+7.4
Turnout			80.9	+4.1
Unionist hold		Swing	+3.7	

Hitchin
Party	Candidate	Votes	%	±%
Unionist	Guy Kindersley	14,786	44.8	−14.4
Liberal	Enid Lapthorn	9,325	28.3	+3.9
Labour	Richard W Gifford	8,880	26.9	+10.5
Majority		5,461	16.5	−18.3
Turnout			73.4	+3.9
Unionist hold		Swing	-9.2	

Holborn
Party	Candidate	Votes	%	±%
Unionist	Stuart Bevan	10,093	56.8	−18.7
Labour	Fitzroy William Hickinbottom	4,530	25.5	+1.0
Liberal	Thomas Morton	3,150	17.7	n/a
Majority		5,563	31.3	−19.7
Turnout			54.1	−1.0
Unionist hold		Swing	-9.8	

Holderness
Party	Candidate	Votes	%	±%
Unionist	Samuel Savery	14,544	47.6	−8.4
Liberal	Neville Dixey	13,525	44.3	+0.3
Labour	Joseph William Hewitt	2,481	8.1	n/a
Majority		1,019	3.3	−8.7
Turnout			80.1	−1.0
Unionist hold		Swing	-4.4	

Holland with Boston
Party	Candidate	Votes	%	±%
Liberal	James Blindell	19,792	43.8	+24.1
Unionist	Frederick James Van den Berg	15,877	35.1	−12.4
Labour	Charles Edward Snook	9,556	21.1	−11.7
Majority		3,915	8.7	
Turnout			81.5	+5.7
Liberal hold		Swing		

Honiton
Party	Candidate	Votes	%	±%
Unionist	Clive Morrison-Bell	17,911	50.9	−4.3
Liberal	John George Hawkins Halse	16,353	46.5	+1.7
Labour	Rose Davies	915	2.6	n/a
Majority		1,558	4.4	−6.0
Turnout			84.3	−1.2
Unionist hold		Swing	-3.0	

Horncastle
Party	Candidate	Votes	%	±%
Unionist	Henry Haslam	12,837	48.1	−4.7
Liberal	Frederick Linfield	10,168	38.1	−9.1
Labour	J. R. Sanderson	3,683	13.8	n/a
Majority		2,669	10.0	+4.4
Turnout		26,688		
Unionist hold		Swing	+2.2	

Hornsey
Party	Candidate	Votes	%	±%
Unionist	Euan Wallace	25,540	51.0	−3.6
Liberal	William Thomson	16,029	32.0	−2.3
Labour	Francis Henry Wiltshire	8,529	17.0	+5.9
Majority		9,511	19.0	−1.3
Turnout			75.2	−6.4
Unionist hold		Swing	-0.7	

Horsham and Worthing
Party	Candidate	Votes	%	±%
Unionist	Edward Turnour	27,872	60.1	
Liberal	Percy Boyden	10,905	23.5	n/a
Labour	Helen Mary Keynes	7,611	16.4	
Majority		16,967	36.6	
Turnout		46,388		
Unionist hold		Swing		

Houghton-le-Spring
Party	Candidate	Votes	%	±%
Labour	Robert Richardson	25,056	57.1	−0.7
Liberal	Thomas Wing	10,267	23.4	−18.8
Unionist	William George Pearson	8,545	19.5	n/a
Majority		14,789	33.7	−18.1
Turnout			80.3	0.7
Labour hold		Swing	-9.0	

Howdenshire
Party	Candidate	Votes	%	±%
Unionist	William Carver	13,823	51.2	−3.0
Liberal	Edward Baker	13,170	48.8	n/a
Majority		653	2.4	n/a
Turnout			76.8	n/a
Unionist hold		Swing	n/a	

Huddersfield
Party	Candidate	Votes	%	±%
Labour	James Hudson	25,966	38.3	+2.0
Liberal	William Mabane	21,398	31.6	−0.1
Unionist	Enoch Hill	20,361	30.1	−1.9
Majority		4,568	6.7	+2.4
Turnout			86.1	−2.4
Labour hold		Swing	+1.0	

Hull Central
Party	Candidate	Votes	%	±%
Labour	Joseph Kenworthy	18,815	54.1	n/a
Unionist	Lawrence Kimball	11,181	32.1	−8.3
Liberal	Alfred Samuel Doran	4,802	13.8	−40.3
Majority		7,634	22.0	30.2
Turnout			78.3	+1.2
Labour gain from Liberal		Swing	n/a	

Hull East
Party	Candidate	Votes	%	±%
Labour	George Muff	20,023	48.8	
Unionist	Roger Lumley	13810	33.6	
Liberal	Rodway Stephens	7,218	17.6	
Majority		6,213	15.2	19.2
Turnout			83.4	
Labour gain from Unionist		Swing	+9.6	

Hull North West
Party	Candidate	Votes	%	±%
Unionist	Lambert Ward	14,764	41.6	−11.7
Labour	William Pickles	10,700	30.1	+11.9
Liberal	Catherine Alderton	10,059	28.3	−0.2
Majority		4,064	11.5	−13.3
Turnout			79.1	−2.1
Unionist hold		Swing	-11.8	

Hull South West
Party	Candidate	Votes	%	±%
Labour	John Arnott	14,903	41.2	+12.0
Unionist	Herbert Grotrian	12,464	34.4	−6.5
Liberal	Herbert Aubrey Crowe	8,826	24.4	−5.5
Majority		2,439	6.8	17.8
Turnout			76.6	+1.2
Labour gain from Unionist		Swing	+9.2	

Huntingdonshire
Party	Candidate	Votes	%	±%
Liberal	Sidney Peters	12,889	45.6	+2.5
Unionist	Charles Murchison	11,935	42.1	−14.8
Labour	C S Giddins	3,493	12.3	n/a
Majority		954	3.5	17.3
Turnout		28,317	77.2	−0.6
Liberal gain from Unionist		Swing	+8.7	

Hythe
Party	Candidate	Votes	%	±%
Unionist	Philip Sassoon	12,982	57.8	−18.7
Liberal	Hester Lloyd Holland	6,912	30.7	n/a
Labour	Grace Colman	2,597	11.5	−12.0
Majority		6,070	27.1	−22.9
Turnout			70.8	−8.9
Unionist hold		Swing	n/a	

Ilford
Party	Candidate	Votes	%	±%
Unionist	George Hamilton	24,414	42.4	−16.0
Liberal	Arthur Comyns Carr	21,267	36.9	+17.0
Labour	Charles Robin de Gruchy	11,952	20.7	−1.0
Majority		3,147	5.5	−33.0
Turnout			73.6	−1.2
Unionist hold		Swing	-16.5	

Ilkeston
Party	Candidate	Votes	%	±%
Labour	George Oliver	20,202	59.0	+14.1
Liberal	John Vincent Shaw	7,766	22.7	+5.1
Unionist	Victor Raikes	6,258	18.3	−19.2
Majority		12,436	36.3	+28.9
Turnout			80.7	+3.9
Labour hold		Swing	+4.5	

Ince
Party	Candidate	Votes	%	±%
Labour	Gordon Macdonald	26,091	73.8	
Unionist	John Bankes Walmsley	9,260	26.2	
Majority		16,831	47.6	
Turnout		35,351		
Labour hold		Swing		

Ipswich
Party	Candidate	Votes	%	±%
Unionist	John Ganzoni	18,527	39.7	−15.7
Labour	Robert Jackson	17,592	37.7	−6.9
Liberal	Frank Ongley Darvall	10,559	22.6	n/a
Majority		935	2.0	
Turnout			85.7	−2.0
Unionist hold		Swing	-4.4	

Isle of Ely
Party	Candidate	Votes	%	±%
Liberal	James de Rothschild	16,111	43.9	+4.6
Unionist	Hugh Lucas-Tooth	13,628	37.1	−9.0
Labour	Dermot Johnston Freyer	6,967	19.0	+4.4
Majority		2,483	6.8	13.6
Turnout			75.0	−0.7
Liberal gain from Unionist		Swing	+6.8	

Isle of Thanet
Party	Candidate	Votes	%	±%
Unionist	Harold Balfour	22,595	52.9	−12.9
Liberal	Alfred Suenson-Taylor	15,648	36.6	+15.5
Labour	E J Plaisted	4,490	10.5	−2.6
Majority		6,947	16.3	−28.4
Turnout			73.3	−4.3
Unionist hold		Swing	-14.2	

Isle of Wight
Party	Candidate	Votes	%	±%
Unionist	Peter Macdonald	21,949	48.2	−4.2
Liberal	St John Hutchinson	17,383	38.1	+0.3
Labour	Henry Edward Weaver	6,256	13.7	+3.9
Majority		4,566	10.1	−4.5
Turnout			79.0	
Unionist hold		Swing	-2.3	

Islington East
Party	Candidate	Votes	%	±%
Labour	Ethel Bentham	15,199	38.0	+5.7
Unionist	Robert Tasker	13,641	34.1	−10.4
Liberal	Edgar Middleton	11,136	27.9	+4.7
Majority		1,558	3.9	16.1
Turnout			66.4	−5.4
Labour gain from Unionist		Swing	+8.0	

Islington North
Party	Candidate	Votes	%	±%
Labour	Robert Young	18,272	41.8	+6.5
Unionist	Gordon Touche	15,207	34.8	−9.6
Liberal	Domini Crosfield	10,210	23.4	+3.1
Majority		3,065	7.0	−2.1
Turnout			68.0	−4.2
Labour gain from Unionist		Swing	+8.0	

Islington South
Party	Candidate	Votes	%	±%
Labour	William Cluse	13,737	46.6	+3.8
Unionist	Tom Howard	9,418	32.0	−3.9
Liberal	Frank Milton	6,316	21.4	+0.1
Majority		4,319	14.6	+7.7
Turnout			66.2	−3.2
Labour hold		Swing	+3.8	

Islington West
Party	Candidate	Votes	%	±%
Labour	Frederick Montague	13,768	55.2	+9.9
Unionist	James Despencer-Robertson	6,921	27.7	−14.6
Liberal	David Eifion Puleston Evans	4,267	17.1	+4.7
Majority		6,847	27.5	+24.5
Turnout			60.2	−7.0
Labour hold		Swing	+12.2	

Jarrow
Party	Candidate	Votes	%	±%
Labour	Robert John Wilson	22,751	62.5	
Unionist	Longinus Vivian Rogers	13,638	37.5	
Majority		9,113	25.0	
Turnout				
Labour hold		Swing		

Keighley
Party	Candidate	Votes	%	±%
Labour	Hastings Lees-Smith	18,412	44.7	−0.3
Liberal	David Rhodes	11,905	28.9	+2.3
Unionist	Arthur Smith	10,858	26.4	−2.0
Majority		6,507	15.8	
Turnout				
Labour hold		Swing	-1.3	

Kennington
Party	Candidate	Votes	%	±%
Labour	Leonard Matters	15,477	55.7	+12.0
Unionist	George Harvey	12,328	44.3	−12.0
Majority		3,149	11.4	24.0
Turnout			60.1	−10.2
Labour gain from Unionist		Swing	+12.0	

Kensington North
Party	Candidate	Votes	%	±%
Labour	Fielding West	19,701	48.4	+1.4
Unionist	Percy Gates	15,511	38.1	−14.9
Liberal	Frances Henrietta Stewart	5,516	13.5	n/a
Majority		4,190	10.3	16.3
Turnout			68.5	−1.1
Labour gain from Unionist		Swing	+8.1	

Kensington South
Party	Candidate	Votes	%	±%
Unionist	William Davison	28,049	66.9	n/a
Liberal	Hugh Seely	7,570	18.0	n/a
Ind. Unionist	Rayner Goddard	6,354	15.1	n/a
Majority		20,479	48.9	n/a
Turnout			59.5	n/a
Unionist hold		Swing	n/a	

Kettering
Party	Candidate	Votes	%	±%
Labour Co-op	Samuel Perry	18,253	43.8	−5.8
Unionist	Mervyn Manningham-Buller	15,469	37.1	−13.3
Liberal	Cuthbert Snowball Rewcastle	7,972	19.1	n/a
Majority		2,784	6.7	7.5
Turnout		41,694	85.8	4.2
Labour Co-op gain from Unionist		Swing	+3.7	

Kidderminster
Party	Candidate	Votes	%	±%
Unionist	John Wardlaw-Milne	21,643	48.1	−11.0
Labour	Frank G. Lloyd	12,246	27.3	+5.0
Liberal	John William Hughes	11,050	24.6	+6.0
Majority		9,397	20.8	−16.0
Turnout			75.6	+4.3
Unionist hold		Swing	-8.0	

King's Lynn
Party	Candidate	Votes	%	±%
Unionist	Maurice Roche	14,501	40.7	−0.9
Liberal	William Bertram Mitford	10,806	30.3	−2.3
Labour	John Maynard	10,356	29.0	+3.2
Majority		3,695	10.4	+1.4
Turnout			79.1	+1.5
Unionist hold		Swing	+0.7	

Kingston upon Thames
Party	Candidate	Votes	%	±%
Unionist	George Penny	20,911	54.1	−16.1
Labour	John William Fawcett	8,903	23.1	+3.3
Liberal	Frank John Powell	8,796	22.8	+12.8
Majority		12,008	31.0	−19.4
Turnout			68.9	−2.4
Unionist hold		Swing	-9.7	

Kingswinford
Party	Candidate	Votes	%	±%
Labour	Charles Sitch	22,479	53.2	
Unionist	Sidney Garcke	12,151	28.7	
Liberal	Alfred William Bowkett	7,639	18.1	
Majority		10,328	24.5	
Turnout				
Labour hold		Swing		

Knutsford
Party	Candidate	Votes	%	±%
Unionist	Ernest Makins	22,605	53.5	−7.0
Liberal	Arthur Edgar Jalland	19,629	46.5	+7.0
Majority		2,976	7.0	−14.0
Turnout			80.5	−0.4
Unionist hold		Swing	-7.0	

== L to P ==
Lambeth North
Party	Candidate	Votes	%	±%
Labour	George Strauss	11,264	43.8	+6.7
Liberal	Frank Briant	10,722	41.8	+4.6
Unionist	Clyde Tabor Wilson	3,691	14.4	−11.3
Majority		542	2.0	n/a
Turnout		25,677	66.2	−0.8
Labour gain from Liberal		Swing	+1.1	

Lancaster
Party	Candidate	Votes	%	±%
Unionist	Herwald Ramsbotham	17,414	39.3	−8.5
Liberal	R. Parkinson Tomlinson	16,977	38.3	+3.6
Labour	Reginald Penrith Burnett	9,903	22.4	+4.9
Majority		437	1.0	−12.1
Turnout			83.9	+1.0
Unionist hold		Swing	-6.1	

Leeds Central
Party	Candidate	Votes	%	±%
Labour	Richard Denman	17,322	44.6	
Unionist	Charles Wilson	15,958	41.0	
Liberal	Myer Jack Landa	5,607	14.4	n/a
Majority		1,364	3.6	
Turnout		38,887		
Labour gain from Unionist		Swing		

Leeds North
Party	Candidate	Votes	%	±%
Unionist	Osbert Peake	19,661	48.2	−21.8
Labour	Thomas McCall	11,180	27.4	−2.6
Liberal	Edmund Harvey	9,944	24.4	n/a
Majority		8,481	20.8	−19.2
Turnout			73.6	+6.5
Unionist hold		Swing	-9.6	

Leeds North East
Party	Candidate	Votes	%	±%
Unionist	John Birchall	18,877	47.0	−10.8
Labour	David Freeman	13,050	32.5	+0.9
Liberal	Charles Humphrey Boyle	8,253	20.5	+9.9
Majority		5,827	14.5	−11.7
Turnout			74.3	−0.3
Unionist hold		Swing	-5.8	

Leeds South
Party	Candidate	Votes	%	±%
Labour	Henry Charleton	18,043	52.5	
Unionist	B.T. Graham Ford	9,433	27.4	
Liberal	Ernest Kilburn Scott	6,884	20.0	
Majority		8,610	25.1	
Turnout		34,360		
Labour hold		Swing		

Leeds South East
Party	Candidate	Votes	%	±%
Labour	Henry Slesser	22,403	75.2	
Unionist	John C Spurr	7,385	24.8	n/a
Majority		15,018	50.4	
Turnout		29,788		
Labour hold		Swing	n/a	

Leeds West
Party	Candidate	Votes	%	±%
Labour	Thomas Stamford	18,765	47.2	
Unionist	George William Martin	13,129	33.0	
Liberal	Ralph Cleworth	7,892	19.8	
Majority		5,636	14.2	
Turnout		39,786	79.4	
Labour hold		Swing		

Leek
Party	Candidate	Votes	%	±%
Labour	William Bromfield	22,458	58.5	
Unionist	Edward George Warris Hulton	15,953	41.5	
Majority		6,505	17.0	
Turnout		38,411		
Labour hold		Swing		

Leicester East
Party	Candidate	Votes	%	±%
Labour	Frank Wise	22,533	50.8	
Unionist	John Loder	13,801	31.1	
Liberal	Frederick Lawson	8,054	18.1	n/a
Majority		8,732	19.7	
Turnout				
Labour gain from Unionist		Swing		

Leicester South
Party	Candidate	Votes	%	±%
Unionist	Charles Waterhouse	18,343	42.3	−7.7
Labour	Herbert Brough Usher	16,198	37.4	
Liberal	Henry Purchase	8,811	20.3	+0.0
Majority		2,145	4.9	
Turnout			80.4	−1.1
Unionist hold		Swing		

Leicester West
Party	Candidate	Votes	%	±%
Labour	Frederick Pethick-Lawrence	22,635	55.3	
Unionist	Paul Emrys-Evans	10,691	26.1	n/a
Liberal	Charles William Hartshorn	7,617	18.6	
Majority		11,944	29.2	
Turnout				
Labour hold		Swing	n/a	

Leigh
Party	Candidate	Votes	%	±%
Labour	Joe Tinker	25,635	57.0	
Unionist	Claude Herbert Grundy	10,942	24.3	
Liberal	Thomas Hardy	8,435	18.7	n/a
Majority		14,693	32.7	
Turnout			88.3	
Labour hold		Swing		

Leominster
Party	Candidate	Votes	%	±%
Unionist	Ernest Shepperson	13,237	52.5	−11.9
Liberal	George Adolphus Edinger	11,990	47.5	+11.9
Majority		1,247	5.0	−23.8
Turnout			76.3	
Unionist hold		Swing	-11.9	

Lewes
Party	Candidate	Votes	%	±%
Unionist	Tufton Beamish	15,230	53.7	−19.0
Labour	Alban Goodwin Gordon	7,698	27.1	−0.2
Liberal	Henry Plunket Woodgate	5,452	19.2	n/a
Majority		7,532	26.6	
Turnout			70.4	+5.7
Unionist hold		Swing	-9.4	

Lewisham East
Party	Candidate	Votes	%	±%
Unionist	Assheton Pownall	23,208	42.4	
Labour	John Wilmot	22,806	41.7	
Liberal	Edward Penton	8729	15.9	n/a
Majority		402	0.7	
Turnout				
Unionist hold		Swing		

Lewisham West
Party	Candidate	Votes	%	±%
Unionist	Philip Dawson	20,830	49.1	−10.2
Labour	C M Wadham	10,958	25.9	+5.4
Liberal	Arthur Reginald Newsom Roberts	10,590	25.0	+4.7
Majority		9,872	23.2	−15.6
Turnout			69.3	−6.2
Unionist hold		Swing	-7.8	

Leyton East
Party	Candidate	Votes	%	±%
Labour	Fenner Brockway	11,111	42.9	
Unionist	Ernest Alexander	8,691	33.6	
Liberal	Frank Wynne Davies	6,096	23.5	
Majority		2,420	9.3	
Turnout			72.6	
Labour gain from Unionist		Swing		

Leyton West
Party	Candidate	Votes	%	±%
Labour	Reginald Sorensen	14,339	42.1	+7.4
Unionist	James Cassels	12,186	35.8	−10.9
Liberal	James Johnston	7,526	22.1	+3.5
Majority		2,153	6.3	18.3
Turnout			74.8	−3.8
Labour gain from Unionist		Swing	9.1	

Lichfield
Party	Candidate	Votes	%	±%
Labour	James Lovat-Fraser	14,965	42.6	
Unionist	S Samuel	11,511	32.8	
Liberal	Etienne Bruno de Hamel	8,643	24.6	
Majority		3,454	9.8	
Turnout				
Labour gain from Unionist		Swing		

Limehouse
Party	Candidate	Votes	%	±%
Labour	Clement Attlee	13,872	55.9	−1.8
Unionist	Evan Morgan	6,584	26.5	−1.6
Liberal	Jasper Addis	4,116	16.6	+2.4
Communist	Wally Tapsell	245	1.0	n/a
Majority		7,288	29.4	−0.2
Turnout			64.6	−1.0
Labour hold		Swing	-0.1	

Lincoln
Party	Candidate	Votes	%	±%
Labour	Robert Arthur Taylor	15,176	43.5	
Unionist	Benjamin Lampard-Vachell	11,978	34.3	
Liberal	Robert Pattinson	7,719	22.1	
Majority		3,198	9.2	
Turnout				
Labour hold		Swing		

Liverpool East Toxteth
Party	Candidate	Votes	%	±%
Unionist	Henry Mond	17,678	47.9	+6.7
Labour	Joseph Cleary	9,904	26.9	−2.3
Liberal	Aled Roberts	9,287	25.2	−2.4
Majority		7,774	21.0	+7.0
Turnout		36,869	75.5	+13.8
Unionist hold		Swing	+4.5	

Liverpool Edge Hill
Party	Candidate	Votes	%	±%
Labour	Jack Hayes	17,650	55.4	
Unionist	Hugo Rutherford	11,622	36.5	
Liberal	Arthur Donald Dennis	2,581	8.1	
Majority		6,028	18.9	
Turnout				
Labour hold		Swing		

Liverpool Everton
Party	Candidate	Votes	%	±%
Labour	Derwent Hall Caine	14,234	52.9	+4.4
Unionist	Margaret Beavan	12,667	47.1	−4.4
Majority		1,567	5.8	8.8
Turnout		26,901	75.9	+3.6
Labour gain from Unionist		Swing	+4.4	

Liverpool Exchange
Party	Candidate	Votes	%	±%
Unionist	James Reynolds	17,179	50.3	n/a
Labour	William Albert Robinson	16,970	49.7	n/a
Majority		209	0.6	n/a
Turnout		34,149	65.9	n/a
Unionist hold		Swing	n/a	

Liverpool Fairfield
Party	Candidate	Votes	%	±%
Unionist	Jack Cohen	16,436	52.9	
Labour	John Hamer Sutcliffe	14,614	47.1	
Majority		1,822	5.8	
Turnout		31,050		
Unionist hold		Swing		

Liverpool Kirkdale
Party	Candidate	Votes	%	±%
Labour	Elijah Sandham	15,222	51.3	
Unionist	Robert Rankin	14,429	48.7	
Majority		793	2.6	
Turnout			72.9	
Labour gain from Unionist		Swing		

Liverpool Scotland
Party	Candidate	Votes	%	±%
Irish Nationalist	T. P. O'Connor	unopposed	n/a	n/a
Irish Nationalist hold		Swing	n/a	

Liverpool Walton
Party	Candidate	Votes	%	±%
Unionist	Reginald Purbrick	16,623	42.8	
Labour	F A P Rowe	16,395	42.2	
Liberal	Glyn Howard Howard-Jones	5,857	15.0	
Majority		228	0.6	
Turnout				
Unionist hold		Swing		

Liverpool Wavertree
Party	Candidate	Votes	%	±%
Unionist	John Tinné	16,880	40.0	−7.4
Labour	Samuel Lewis Treleaven	13,585	32.2	−2.8
Liberal	Hugh Rathbone	11,723	27.8	+10.2
Majority		3,295	7.8	−4.6
Turnout		42,188	78.1	−2.2
Unionist hold		Swing	−2.3	

Liverpool West Derby
Party	Candidate	Votes	%	±%
Unionist	John Sandeman Allen	16,794	42.7	−9.8
Labour	William Harvey Moore	14,124	36.0	+6.4
Liberal	Arthur Probyn Jones	8,368	21.3	+3.4
Majority		2,670	6.7	−16.2
Turnout			73.1	−4.1
Unionist hold		Swing	-8.1	

Liverpool West Toxteth
Party	Candidate	Votes	%	±%
Labour	Joseph Gibbins	19,988	55.1	+4.5
Unionist	Geoffrey Watson	16,309	44.9	−4.5
Majority		3,679	10.2	+9.0
Turnout		36,297	76.2	−3.5
Labour hold		Swing	+4.5	

Lonsdale
Party	Candidate	Votes	%	±%
Unionist	David Lindsay	13,612	47.4	−10.0
Liberal	Henry Maden	7,805	27.2	−15.4
Labour	Joseph Henderson	7,303	25.4	n/a
Majority		5,807	20.2	+5.4
Turnout			82.7	−0.6
Unionist hold		Swing	+2.7	

Loughborough
Party	Candidate	Votes	%	±%
Labour	Ernest Winterton	14,854	40.0	+5.1
Unionist	Frank Rye	12,210	32.9	−7.0
Liberal	Frank Gladstone Hines	10,044	27.1	+1.9
Majority		2,644	7.1	12.1
Turnout			85.2	+1.5
Labour gain from Unionist		Swing	+6.0	

Louth
Party	Candidate	Votes	%	±%
Unionist	Arthur Heneage	13,999	44.4	−8.4
Liberal	Margaret Wintringham	13,560	42.9	−4.3
Labour	T Holmes	4,027	12.7	n/a
Majority		439	1.5	−4.1
Turnout			81.8	+0.9
Unionist hold		Swing	-2.1	

Lowestoft
Party	Candidate	Votes	%	±%
Unionist	Gervais Rentoul	13,624	39.8	−10.8
Liberal	Albert Edward Owen-Jones	10,707	31.3	+6.7
Labour	Basil William Reid Hall	9,903	28.9	+4.1
Majority		2,917	8.5	−17.3
Turnout		34,234	84.8	+11.8
Unionist hold		Swing	-8.8	

Ludlow
Party	Candidate	Votes	%	±%
Unionist	George Windsor-Clive	14,066	57.1	n/a
Labour	T. Hardwick	5,323	21.6	n/a
Liberal	Arthur Alan Hanbury-Sparrow	5,259	21.3	n/a
Majority		8,743	35.5	n/a
Turnout			76.5	n/a
Unionist hold		Swing	n/a	

Luton
Party	Candidate	Votes	%	±%
Liberal	Leslie Burgin	20,248	45.5	+10.4
Unionist	Terence O'Connor	16,930	38.0	−9.1
Labour	Florence Bell	7,351	16.5	−1.3
Majority		3,318	7.5	19.5
Turnout			81.5	−1.1
Liberal gain from Unionist		Swing	+9.8	

Macclesfield
Party	Candidate	Votes	%	±%
Unionist	John Remer	19,329	41.9	−9.0
Labour	John Williams	13,911	30.2	+0.1
Liberal	Selwyn Lloyd	12,891	27.9	+8.9
Majority		5,418	11.7	−9.1
Turnout			87.0	+2.4
Unionist hold		Swing	-4.5	

Maidstone
Party	Candidate	Votes	%	±%
Unionist	Carlyon Bellairs	14,254	40.8	−25.5
Labour	John Morgan	10,419	29.9	−3.8
Liberal	Thomas Fairchild Day	10,222	29.3	n/a
Majority		3,835	10.9	−21.7
Turnout				
Unionist hold		Swing	-10.8	

Maldon
Party	Candidate	Votes	%	±%
Unionist	Edward Ruggles-Brise	14,020	43.8	−8.5
Labour	Herbert Evans	11,224	35.1	−1.8
Liberal	Herbert Alfred May	6,748	21.1	+10.3
Majority		2,796	8.7	−6.7
Turnout		31,992	79.5	−3.1
Unionist hold		Swing	-3.3	

Manchester Ardwick
Party	Candidate	Votes	%	±%
Labour	Thomas Lowth	20,041	60.3	
Unionist	Mary Kingsmill Jones	13,177	39.7	
Majority		6,864	20.6	
Turnout		33,218		
Labour hold		Swing		

Manchester Blackley
Party	Candidate	Votes	%	±%
Liberal	Philip Oliver	11,006	36.4	+5.7
Unionist	Harold Briggs	10,118	33.5	−9.7
Labour	Wilfrid Andrew Burke	9,091	30.1	+2.6
Majority		888	2.9	15.4
Turnout			82.6	−2.9
Liberal gain from Unionist		Swing	+7.7	

Manchester Clayton
Party	Candidate	Votes	%	±%
Labour	John Edward Sutton	21,103	55.0	
Unionist	William Flanagan	14,062	36.7	
Liberal	Charles Harold Travis	3,207	8.3	
Majority		7,041	18.3	
Turnout				
Labour hold		Swing		

Manchester Exchange
Party	Candidate	Votes	%	±%
Unionist	Edward Fielden	13,691	40.1	−15.1
Liberal	Robert Noton Barclay	11,112	32.6	−12.2
Labour	Abraham Moss	9,300	27.3	n/a
Majority		2,579	7.6	−2.9
Turnout		34,103	70.2	+11.3
Unionist hold		Swing	-1.5	

Manchester Gorton
Party	Candidate	Votes	%	±%
Labour	Joseph Compton	22,056	61.1	
Unionist	Alfred Critchley	10,664	29.5	
Liberal	Beatrice Annie Bayfield	3,385	9.4	
Majority		11,392	31.6	
Turnout				
Labour hold		Swing		

Manchester Hulme
Party	Candidate	Votes	%	±%
Labour	Andrew McElwee	15,053	43.8	
Unionist	Joseph Nall	12,588	36.6	
Liberal	Harry Allan	6,728	19.6	
Majority		2,465	7.2	
Turnout		34,369		
Labour gain from Unionist		Swing		

Manchester Moss Side
Party	Candidate	Votes	%	±%
Unionist	Gerald Hurst	11,625	39.6	−18.7
Labour	A. A. Purcell	9,522	32.5	n/a
Liberal	Thomas Ackroyd	8,191	27.9	−13.8
Majority		2,103	7.2	−9.4
Turnout		29,338	68.3	−1.0
Unionist hold		Swing	n/a	

Manchester Platting
Party	Candidate	Votes	%	±%
Labour	J. R. Clynes	22,969	57.9	
Unionist	Alan Chorlton	16,323	41.1	
Communist	Joe Vaughan	401	1.0	
Majority		6,646	16.8	
Turnout		39,693		
Labour hold		Swing		

Manchester Rusholme
Party	Candidate	Votes	%	±%
Unionist	Frank Merriman	14,230	42.8	−7.6
Liberal	Philip Guedalla	10,958	32.9	+3.5
Labour	Jerrold Adshead	8,080	24.3	+4.1
Majority		3,272	9.9	−11.1
Turnout		33,268	78.7	−1.1
Unionist hold		Swing	-5.5	

Manchester Withington
Party	Candidate	Votes	%	±%
Liberal	Ernest Simon	20,948	43.8	+4.8
Unionist	Thomas Watts	19,063	39.8	−11.1
Labour	Joseph Robinson	7,853	16.4	+7.2
Majority		1,885	4.0	15.9
Turnout			77.8	−4.0
Liberal gain from Unionist		Swing	+8.0	

Mansfield
Party	Candidate	Votes	%	±%
Labour	Charles Brown	28,416	58.5	
Liberal	William Collins	10,517	21.7	
Unionist	S R Sidebottom	9,085	18.7	
Communist	Rosina Smith	533	1.1	
Majority		17,899	36.8	
Turnout				
Labour hold		Swing		

Melton
Party	Candidate	Votes	%	±%
Unionist	Lindsay Everard	18,707	47.4	−11.5
Liberal	Guy Halford Dixon	14,144	35.9	−5.2
Labour	A. E. Stubbs	6,569	16.7	n/a
Majority		4,563	11.5	−6.3
Turnout			83.2	−1.1
Unionist hold		Swing	-3.2	

Middlesbrough East
Party	Candidate	Votes	%	±%
Labour	Ellen Wilkinson	12,215	41.3	+2.8
Liberal	Ernest Young	9,016	30.6	+3.8
Unionist	John Wesley Brown	8,278	28.1	−6.6
Majority		3,199	10.7	+6.9
Turnout			80.8	−2.9
Labour hold		Swing	-0.5	

Middlesbrough West
Party	Candidate	Votes	%	±%
Liberal	F. Kingsley Griffith	14,674	40.6	n/a
Labour	A.R. Ellis	13,328	36.9	n/a
Unionist	Albert E Baucher	8,137	22.5	n/a
Majority		1,346	3.7	n/a
Turnout				n/a
Liberal hold		Swing	n/a	

Middleton and Prestwich
Party	Candidate	Votes	%	±%
Unionist	Nairne Stewart Sandeman	16,629	40.1	−11.2
Labour	Matthew Burrow Farr	14,368	34.6	+7.6
Liberal	David Halliwell	10,526	25.3	+3.6
Majority		2,261	5.5	−18.8
Turnout				
Unionist hold		Swing	-9.4	

Mile End
Party	Candidate	Votes	%	±%
Labour	John Scurr	11,489	47.1	−1.4
Unionist	Johnnie Dodge	7,401	30.3	+1.4
Liberal	Solomon Teff	5,525	22.6	0.0
Majority		4,088	16.8	−2.8
Turnout			70.4	−0.3
Labour hold		Swing	-1.4	

Mitcham
Party	Candidate	Votes	%	±%
Unionist	Richard Meller	20,254	47.9	−14.1
Labour	Benjamin Skene Mackay	13,057	30.8	−7.2
Liberal	Raymond V. Jones	9,016	21.3	n/a
Majority		7,197	17.1	−6.9
Turnout			70.2	−4.6
Unionist hold		Swing	-6.9	

Morpeth
Party	Candidate	Votes	%	±%
Labour	Ebenezer Edwards	25,508	61.3	
Unionist	Irene Ward	9,206	22.1	
Liberal	John Ritson	6,888	16.6	
Majority		16,302	39.2	
Turnout				
Labour hold		Swing		

Mossley
Party	Candidate	Votes	%	±%
Labour	Herbert Gibson	19,296	46.0	+11.7
Independent	Austin Hopkinson	14,267	33.9	−15.3
Liberal	Harold Housley	8,467	20.1	+3.6
Majority		5,029	12.1	27.0
Turnout		42,030	76.8	
Labour gain from Independent		Swing	+13.5	

Nelson and Colne
Party	Candidate	Votes	%	±%
Labour	Arthur Greenwood	28,533	61.0	+9.1
Unionist	Linton Thorp	18,236	39.0	−9.1
Majority		10,297	22.0	+18.2
Turnout		46,769		
Labour hold		Swing	+9.1	

New Forest and Christchurch
Party	Candidate	Votes	%	±%
Unionist	Wilfrid Ashley	22,122	55.5	−9.1
Liberal	Marcus Cheke	11,520	28.9	+4.8
Labour	G W Austin	6,206	15.6	+4.3
Majority		10,602	26.6	−13.9
Turnout			72.6	+1.2
Unionist hold		Swing	-7.0	

Newark
Party	Candidate	Votes	%	±%
Unionist	William Cavendish-Bentinck	15,707	45.5	−15.0
Liberal	James Haslam	10,768	31.2	+13.5
Labour	William Richard Grosvenor Haywood	8,060	23.3	+1.5
Majority		4,939	14.3	−24.4
Turnout			77.0	+2.8
Unionist hold		Swing	-14.3	

Newbury
Party	Candidate	Votes	%	±%
Unionist	Howard Clifton Brown	17,800	51.0	−4.9
Liberal	Edward Harold Brooks	13,604	39.0	−0.5
Labour	Frank Mortimer Jacques	3,471	10.0	+5.4
Majority		4,196	12.0	−4.4
Turnout		34,875	78.3	−2.6
Unionist hold		Swing	-2.2	

Newcastle-under-Lyme
Party	Candidate	Votes	%	±%
Labour	Josiah Wedgwood	20,931	69.9	
Unionist	Christopher Kemplay Tatham	9,011	30.1	
Majority		11,920	39.8	
Turnout		29,942		
Labour hold		Swing		

Newcastle-upon-Tyne Central
Party	Candidate	Votes	%	±%
Labour	Charles Trevelyan	17,580	57.2	
Unionist	Richard Wyndham-Quin	13,161	42.8	
Majority		4,419	14.4	
Turnout		30,741	73.7	
Labour hold		Swing		

Newcastle upon Tyne East
Party	Candidate	Votes	%	±%
Liberal	Robert Aske	17,856	51.3	+6.2
Labour	Martin Connolly	16,921	48.7	+2.3
Majority		935	2.6	3.9
Turnout			79.4	−4.5
Liberal gain from Labour		Swing	+2.0	

Newcastle-upon-Tyne North
Party	Candidate	Votes	%	±%
Unionist	Nicholas Grattan-Doyle	17,962	55.4	
Labour	Edward Scott	7,573	23.4	
Liberal	J. Roberts Creighton	6,860	21.2	n/a
Majority		10,389	32.0	
Turnout			70.9	
Unionist hold		Swing		

Newcastle upon Tyne West
Party	Candidate	Votes	%	±%
Labour	John Palin	16,856	46.6	+1.1
Unionist	Joseph William Leech	14,088	38.9	+9.5
Liberal	John Dodd	5,267	14.5	−10.6
Majority		2,768	7.7	−8.4
Turnout			76.8	−7.0
Labour hold		Swing	-4.2	

Newton
Party	Candidate	Votes	%	±%
Labour	Robert Young	18,176	60.5	
Unionist	Reginald Essenhigh	11,887	39.5	
Majority		6,289	21.0	
Turnout		30,063		
Labour hold		Swing		

Norfolk East
Party	Candidate	Votes	%	±%
Liberal	William Lygon	13,349	39.6	+3.6
Unionist	Reginald Neville	12,434	37.0	−7.6
Labour	Bill Holmes	7,856	23.4	+4.0
Majority		915	2.6	11.2
Turnout			77.6	+2.0
Liberal gain from Unionist		Swing	5.6	

Norfolk North
Party	Candidate	Votes	%	±%
Labour	Noel Noel-Buxton	14,544	47.5	
Unionist	Thomas Cook	12,661	41.3	
Liberal	Zelia Hoffman	3,403	11.1	
Majority		1,883	6.2	
Turnout			77.9	
Labour hold		Swing		

Norfolk South
Party	Candidate	Votes	%	±%
Unionist	James Christie	12,978	42.0	−13.5
Labour	George Young	10,686	34.5	−10.0
Liberal	Ieuan Watkins-Evans	7,268	23.5	n/a
Majority		2,292	7.5	−3.5
Turnout			76.0	
Unionist hold		Swing	-1.7	

Norfolk South West
Party	Candidate	Votes	%	±%
Labour	W. B. Taylor	12,152	41.8	
Unionist	Alan McLean	11,382	39.1	
Liberal	Victor Diederichs Duval	5,556	19.0	n/a
Majority		770	2.7	
Turnout				
Labour gain from Unionist		Swing		

Normanton
Party	Candidate	Votes	%	±%
Labour	Frederick Hall	26,008	83.1	n/a
Unionist	Alfred Coates	5,276	16.9	n/a
Majority		20,732	66.2	n/a
Turnout			75.8	n/a
Labour hold		Swing	n/a	

Northampton
Party	Candidate	Votes	%	±%
Labour	Cecil Malone	22,356	41.7	+4.5
Unionist	Alexander Frederick Gordon Renton	20,177	37.7	−1.8
Liberal	Helen Schilizzi	11,054	20.6	−2.7
Majority		2,179	4.0	6.3
Turnout			87.5	+0.5
Labour gain from Unionist		Swing	+3.1	

Northwich
Party	Candidate	Votes	%	±%
Unionist	Colum Crichton-Stuart	15,477	34.3	−8.9
Labour	Barbara Ayrton-Gould	15,473	34.3	−0.3
Liberal	John Barlow	14,163	31.4	+9.2
Majority		4	0.0	−8.6
Turnout			83.6	+2.9
Unionist hold		Swing	-4.3	

Norwich (2 seats)
Party	Candidate	Votes	%	±%
Liberal	Geoffrey Shakespeare	33,974	26.2	
Labour	Walter Smith	33,690	26.0	
Labour	Dorothy Jewson	31,040	24.0	
Unionist	J. Griffyth Fairfax	30,793	23.8	
Majority		2,650	2.0	
Turnout		67,971	82.7	
Labour gain from Unionist		Swing		

Norwood
Party	Candidate	Votes	%	±%
Unionist	Walter Greaves-Lord	19,281	50.6	−20.7
Labour	William Obrien Reeves	11,042	28.9	+0.2
Liberal	Edward Stacey Layton	7,823	20.5	n/a
Majority		8,239	21.7	−20.9
Turnout			65.6	−4.6
Unionist hold		Swing	-10.4	

Nottingham Central
Party	Candidate	Votes	%	±%
Unionist	Albert Bennett	14,571	41.7	−15.6
Labour	Eleanor Barton	11,573	33.2	+7.2
Liberal	Arthur Brampton	8,738	25.1	+8.4
Majority		2,998	8.5	−22.8
Turnout				
Unionist hold		Swing	-11.4	

Nottingham East
Party	Candidate	Votes	%	±%
Liberal	Norman Birkett	14,049	40.2	−1.4
Unionist	Louis Gluckstein	11,110	31.8	−15.8
Labour	James Henry Baum	9,787	28.0	+28.0
Majority		2,939	8.4	14.4
Turnout		34,946	78.9	+4.2
Liberal gain from Unionist		Swing	+7.2	

Nottingham South
Party	Candidate	Votes	%	±%
Labour	Holford Knight	14,800	42.9	
Unionist	Henry Cavendish-Bentinck	14,252	41.3	
Liberal	Leslie Hale	5,445	15.8	
Majority		548	1.6	
Turnout				
Labour gain from Unionist		Swing		

Nottingham West
Party	Candidate	Votes	%	±%
Labour	Arthur Hayday	18,593	55.1	
Liberal	Walter Edward Barron	8,276	24.5	
Unionist	Charles Edgar Loseby	6,893	20.4	
Majority		10,317	30.6	
Turnout				
Labour hold		Swing		

Nuneaton
Party	Candidate	Votes	%	±%
Labour	Frank Smith	27,102	44.4	+13.1
Liberal	Herbert Willison	19,104	31.3	+0.3
Unionist	Arthur Hope	14,819	24.3	−13.4
Majority		7,998	13.1	19.5
Turnout			84.1	+5.4
Labour gain from Unionist		Swing	+13.2	

Oldham (2 seats)
Party	Candidate	Votes	%	±%
Labour	✓ Gordon Lang	34,223	26.2	+6.5
Labour	✓ James Wilson	32,727	25.0	+6.6
Unionist	Duff Cooper	29,424	22.5	−8.7
Liberal	John Dodd	20,810	15.9	−14.8
Liberal	George James Jenkins	13,528	10.4	n/a
Majority		3,303	2.5	13.5
Turnout		77,208	81.2	
Labour gain from Unionist		Swing		
Labour gain from Liberal		Swing		

Ormskirk
Party	Candidate	Votes	%	±%
Labour	Samuel Rosbotham	20,350	53.4	+9.7
Unionist	Francis Blundell	17,761	46.6	−9.7
Majority		2,589	6.8	19.4
Turnout		38,111	74.8	−1.1
Labour gain from Unionist		Swing	+9.7	

Oswestry
Party	Candidate	Votes	%	±%
Unionist	Bertie Leighton	15,554	47.0	−8.1
Liberal	John Share Jones	10,565	32.0	+8.3
Labour	H S Evans	6,944	21.0	−0.2
Majority		4,989	15.0	−16.4
Turnout			78.8	−0.1
Unionist hold		Swing	-8.2	

Oxford
Party	Candidate	Votes	%	±%
Unionist	Robert Bourne	14,638	52.5	−4.8
Liberal	Robert Oswald Moon	8,581	30.7	−1.4
Labour	John Lyttelton Etty	4,694	16.8	+6.2
Majority		6,057	21.8	−3.4
Turnout			72.2	−6.3
Unionist hold		Swing	-1.7	

Paddington North
Party	Candidate	Votes	%	±%
Unionist	Brendan Bracken	13,876	40.9	−10.1
Labour	John William Gordon	13,348	39.3	+1.2
Liberal	Reginald Myer	6,723	19.8	+8.9
Majority		528	1.6	−11.3
Turnout		33,947	69.0	
Unionist hold		Swing	-5.6	

Paddington South
Party	Candidate	Votes	%	±%
Unionist	Douglas King	unopposed	n/a	n/a
Unionist hold		Swing	n/a	

Peckham
Party	Candidate	Votes	%	±%
Labour	John Beckett	15,751	48.9	+2.8
Unionist	Douglas Cooke	10,246	31.8	−11.1
Liberal	George Ivor Phillips	6,187	19.2	+8.2
Majority		5,505	17.1	+13.9
Turnout		32,184	67.0	−7.2
Labour hold		Swing	+6.9	

Penistone
Party	Candidate	Votes	%	±%
Labour	Rennie Smith	17,286	45.2	+6.7
Unionist	Francis George Bibbings	10,640	27.9	−10.6
Liberal	Ashley Mitchell	10,277	26.9	−0.5
Majority		6,646	17.3	+17.3
Turnout		38,203	81.6	+1.0
Labour hold		Swing	+8.6	

Penrith and Cockermouth
Party	Candidate	Votes	%	±%
Unionist	Arthur Dixey	10,595	45.2	−22.7
Liberal	Arthur Holgate	8,750	37.4	n/a
Labour	Archibald Dodd	4,073	17.4	−14.7
Majority		1,845	7.8	−28.0
Turnout			85.3	+9.4
Unionist hold		Swing	n/a	

Penryn and Falmouth,
Party	Candidate	Votes	%	±%
Liberal	Tudor Walters	14,274	37.0	+2.7
Unionist	Maurice Petherick	13,136	34.1	−9.2
Labour	Frederick Jesse Hopkins	11,166	28.9	+6.5
Majority		1,138	2.9	11.9
Turnout			78.4	+3.7
Liberal gain from Unionist		Swing	+6.0	

Peterborough
Party	Candidate	Votes	%	±%
Labour	Frank Horrabin	14,743	39.1	
Unionist	Henry Brassey	14,218	37.7	
Liberal	Francis Hill	8,704	23.1	
Majority		525	1.4	
Turnout		37,665		
Labour gain from Unionist		Swing		

Petersfield
Party	Candidate	Votes	%	±%
Unionist	William Graham Nicholson	15,605	55.0	−14.8
Liberal	Gerald Bailey	9,334	32.9	+15.0
Labour	Getrude Speedwell Massingham	3,418	12.1	−0.2
Majority		6,271	22.1	−29.8
Turnout			68.2	+1.9
Unionist hold		Swing	-14.9	

Plaistow
Party	Candidate	Votes	%	±%
Labour	Will Thorne	23,635	77.5	+10.4
Unionist	S M Lancaster	6,851	22.5	−10.4
Majority		16,784	55.0	+20.8
Turnout		30,486	63.2	+1.1
Labour hold		Swing	+10.4	

Plymouth Devonport
Party	Candidate	Votes	%	±%
Liberal	Leslie Hore-Belisha	15,233	45.7	+6.0
Unionist	Samuel Gluckstein	10,688	32.0	−5.6
Labour	Donald Beaton Fraser	7,428	22.3	−0.4
Majority		4,545	13.7	+11.6
Turnout			82.3	−2.1
Liberal hold		Swing	+5.8	

Plymouth Drake
Party	Candidate	Votes	%	±%
Labour	James John Hamlyn Moses	16,684	44.3	
Unionist	Arthur Benn	14,673	39.0	
Liberal	Hugh MacDonald Pratt	6,309	16.7	
Majority		2,011	5.3	
Turnout			80.5	
Labour gain from Unionist		Swing		

Plymouth Sutton
Party	Candidate	Votes	%	±%
Unionist	Nancy Astor	16,625	43.2	−15.9
Labour	William Westwood	16,414	42.7	+0.8
Liberal	Thomas Henry Aggett	5,430	14.1	n/a
Majority		211	0.5	−15.7
Turnout			81.1	−0.5
Unionist hold		Swing	-7.8	

Pontefract
Party	Candidate	Votes	%	±%
Labour	Tom Smith	17,335	47.8	−0.9
Unionist	Christopher Brooke	10,040	27.7	−23.6
Liberal	Harold Powis	8,892	24.5	n/a
Majority		7,295	20.1	22.7
Turnout			80.1	+3.9
Labour gain from Unionist		Swing	+11.3	

Poplar South
Party	Candidate	Votes	%	±%
Labour	Samuel March	19,696	64.8	+2.2
Liberal	Harold Heathcote-Williams	7,185	23.6	−13.8
Unionist	Elliot Marcet Gorst	3,532	11.6	n/a
Majority		12,511	41.2	+16.0
Turnout			63.6	−4.0
Labour hold		Swing	+8.0	

Portsmouth Central
Party	Candidate	Votes	%	±%
Labour	Glenvil Hall	15,153	42.4	+7.9
Unionist	Thomas Comyn-Platt	13,628	38.1	−8.0
Liberal	Charles Waley Cohen	6,993	19.5	+0.1
Majority		1,525	4.3	15.9
Turnout			74.3	−6.0
Labour gain from Unionist		Swing	+7.9	

Portsmouth North
Party	Candidate	Votes	%	±%
Unionist	Bertram Falle	15,352	44.5	
Labour	Edward Archbold	12,475	36.2	
Liberal	Archibald William Palmer	6,643	19.3	
Majority		2,877	8.3	
Turnout				
Unionist hold		Swing		

Portsmouth South
Party	Candidate	Votes	%	±%
Unionist	Herbert Cayzer	15,068	36.8	−36.2
Labour	Jessie Stephen	10,127	24.8	−2.2
Ind. Unionist	Frank Privett	9,505	23.2	n/a
Liberal	Charles Rudkin	6,214	15.2	n/a
Majority		4,941	12.0	−34.0
Turnout		40,914	75.1	+0.9
Unionist hold		Swing	-17.0	

Preston (2 seats)
Party	Candidate	Votes	%	±%
Labour	Tom Shaw	37,705	29.5	+3.2
Liberal	William Jowitt	31,277	24.4	−0.2
Unionist	Alfred Howitt	29,116	22.8	−2.4
Unionist	Charles Emmott	27,754	21.7	−2.2
Independent Labour	S M Holden	2,111	1.6	n/a
Majority		8,589	6.7	+6.1
Turnout		71,946	78.2	
Labour hold		Swing		
Liberal gain from Unionist		Swing		

Pudsey and Otley
Party	Candidate	Votes	%	±%
Unionist	Granville Gibson	16,729	41.1	−9.9
Labour	A W Brown	12,336	30.3	+5.0
Liberal	Hubert Houldsworth	11,685	28.7	5.0
Majority		4,393	10.8	−14.9
Turnout		40,750		
Unionist hold		Swing	-7.5	

Putney
Party	Candidate	Votes	%	±%
Unionist	Samuel Samuel	19,657	63.8	−9.6
Labour	John C Lawder	11,136	36.2	+9.6
Majority		8,521	27.6	−17.2
Turnout		30,793	62.1	−6.3
Unionist hold		Swing	-9.6	

== Q to Z ==
Reading
Party	Candidate	Votes	%	±%
Labour	Somerville Hastings	23,281	43.5	−2.7
Unionist	Herbert Williams	22,429	42.0	−11.8
Liberal	Dugald Macfadyen	7,733	14.5	n/a
Majority		852	1.5	−6.1
Turnout			85.0	−0.8
Labour gain from Unionist		Swing	+4.5	

Reigate
Party	Candidate	Votes	%	±%
Unionist	George Cockerill	20,851	54.3	−22.3
Liberal	Harold James Hamblen	9,532	24.8	n/a
Labour	Percy Collick	8,012	20.9	−2.5
Majority		11,319	29.5	−23.7
Turnout		38,395	74.8	+0.8
Unionist hold		Swing	n/a	

Richmond (Yorks)
Party	Candidate	Votes	%	±%
Unionist	Thomas Dugdale	19,763	57.5	n/a
Liberal	John Dixon Hinks	14,634	42.5	n/a
Majority		5,129	15.0	n/a
Turnout			79.4	n/a
Unionist hold		Swing	n/a	

Richmond, Surrey
Party	Candidate	Votes	%	±%
Unionist	Newton Moore	23,148	58.7	−18.1
Labour	Philip Butler	9,520	24.1	+0.9
Liberal	William Henry Williamson	6,802	17.2	n/a
Majority		13,628	34.6	−19.0
Turnout		39,470	70.6	−2.2
Unionist hold		Swing	-9.5	

Ripon
Party	Candidate	Votes	%	±%
Unionist	John Hills	23,173	55.1	n/a
Liberal	Frederick L. Boult	14,542	34.6	n/a
Labour	Arthur Godfrey	4,339	10.3	n/a
Majority		8,631	20.5	n/a
Turnout			76.2	n/a
Unionist hold		Swing	n/a	

Rochdale
Party	Candidate	Votes	%	±%
Labour	William Kelly	22,060	40.2	+6.4
Liberal	Ramsay Muir	16,957	30.8	−2.7
Unionist	John Haslam	15,962	29.0	−3.7
Majority		5,103	9.4	+9.1
Turnout		54,979	87.6	−2.7
Labour hold		Swing	+4.5	

Romford
Party	Candidate	Votes	%	±%
Labour	H. T. Muggeridge	31,045	44.9	
Unionist	Charles Rhys	22,525	32.6	
Liberal	Arthur F Wood	15,527	22.5	
Majority		8,520	12.3	
Turnout				
Labour gain from Unionist		Swing		

Rossendale
Party	Candidate	Votes	%	±%
Labour	Arthur Law	14,624	36.0	+3.6
Liberal	Edwin Bayliss	13,747	33.9	+8.0
Unionist	Wilfrid Sugden	12,225	30.1	−11.6
Majority		877	2.1	11.4
Turnout			87.7	
Labour gain from Unionist		Swing	-2.2	

Rother Valley
Party	Candidate	Votes	%	±%
Labour	Thomas Walter Grundy	30,405	76.3	+11.0
Unionist	Cecil Pike	9,460	23.7	−11.0
Majority		20,945	52.6	+22.0
Turnout			77.8	+1.9
Labour hold		Swing	+11.0	

Rotherham
Party	Candidate	Votes	%	±%
Labour	Fred Lindley	26,937	60.4	+5.8
Unionist	Paul Latham	10,101	22.7	−26.7
Liberal	Reeves Charlesworth	7,534	16.9	n/a
Majority		16,836	37.7	+28.5
Turnout			81.4	−0.4
Labour hold		Swing		

Rotherhithe
Party	Candidate	Votes	%	±%
Labour	Ben Smith	14,664	61.6	+1.3
Unionist	Gurney Braithwaite	4,594	19.3	−20.4
Liberal	Dora West	4,556	19.1	n/a
Majority		10,070	42.3	+21.7
Turnout			65.9	−0.6
Labour hold		Swing	+10.8	

Rothwell
Party	Candidate	Votes	%	±%
Labour	William Lunn	27,320	61.7	
Unionist	James Wilder Harrison	8,799	19.9	n/a
Liberal	Herbert Holdsworth	8,141	18.4	
Majority		18,521	41.8	
Turnout		44,260		
Labour hold		Swing	n/a	

Royton
Party	Candidate	Votes	%	±%
Unionist	Arthur Vernon Davies	15,051	38.4	−5.7
Liberal	Harold Derbyshire	13,347	34.1	−2.3
Labour	Albert Ernest Wood	10,763	27.5	+7.9
Majority		1,704	4.3	−3.4
Turnout				
Unionist hold		Swing	-1.7	

Rugby
Party	Candidate	Votes	%	±%
Unionist	David Margesson	15,147	41.1	−9.1
Labour	John Morgan	11,588	31.4	+18.3
Liberal	Robert Bernays	10,158	27.5	−9.1
Majority		3,559	9.7	−3.9
Turnout		36,893		
Unionist hold		Swing	-13.7	

Rushcliffe
Party	Candidate	Votes	%	±%
Unionist	Henry Betterton	19,145	41.7	
Labour	Florence Widdowson	16,069	35.0	
Liberal	Arthur Marwood	10,724	23.3	n/a
Majority		3,076	6.7	
Turnout				
Unionist hold		Swing		

Rutland and Stamford
Party	Candidate	Votes	%	±%
Unionist	Neville Smith-Carington	12,607	47.4	−19.3
Labour	Henry James Jones	7,403	27.9	−5.4
Liberal	Harry Payne	6,561	24.7	n/a
Majority		5,204	19.5	−13.9
Turnout			76.7	
Unionist hold		Swing	-6.9	

Rye
Party	Candidate	Votes	%	±%
Unionist	George Courthope	18,061	56.9	
Liberal	William Stanley Osborn	10,198	32.1	
Labour	George A. Greenwood	3,505	11.0	n/a
Majority		7,863	24.8	
Turnout				
Unionist hold		Swing		

Saffron Walden
Party	Candidate	Votes	%	±%
Unionist	Rab Butler	13,561	44.5	−7.1
Labour	William Cash	8,642	28.3	+1.7
Liberal	Arthur Musgrove Mathews	8,307	27.2	+5.4
Majority		4,919	16.2	−8.8
Turnout			75.8	+2.7
Unionist hold		Swing	-4.4	

Salford North
Party	Candidate	Votes	%	±%
Labour	Benjamin Tillett	17,333	46.2	
Unionist	Leslie Haden-Guest	13,607	36.2	
Liberal	John Rothwell	6,609	17.6	
Majority		3,726	10.0	
Turnout				
Labour gain from Unionist		Swing		

Salford South
Party	Candidate	Votes	%	±%
Labour	Joseph Toole	20,100	54.4	
Unionist	Edmund Ashworth Radford	16,846	45.6	
Majority		3,254	8.8	
Turnout		36,946		
Labour gain from Unionist		Swing		

Salford West
Party	Candidate	Votes	%	±%
Labour	Alexander Haycock	15,647	42.8	+0.3
Unionist	Fred Astbury	15,289	41.8	−15.7
Liberal	Mary Pollock Grant	5,614	15.4	n/a
Majority		358	1.0	16.0
Turnout			83.4	−1.3
Labour gain from Unionist		Swing	+8.0	

Salisbury
Party	Candidate	Votes	%	±%
Unionist	Hugh Morrison	15,672	47.3	−9.0
Liberal	Lucy Masterman	13,022	39.3	+3.7
Labour	F.R. Hancock	4,435	13.4	+5.3
Majority		2,650	8.0	−12.7
Turnout		33,129	81.9	+0.1
Unionist hold		Swing	-6.4	

Scarborough and Whitby
Party	Candidate	Votes	%	±%
Unionist	Sidney Herbert	20,710	48.3	−9.2
Liberal	Henry Paterson Gisborne	17,544	40.9	+6.7
Labour	Howard Doncaster Rowntree	4,645	10.8	+2.5
Majority		3,166	7.4	−15.9
Turnout			79.7	+0.8
Unionist hold		Swing	-8.0	

Seaham
Party	Candidate	Votes	%	±%
Labour	Ramsay MacDonald	35,615	72.5	+7.0
Unionist	William Arthur Fearnley-Whittingstall	6,821	13.9	−20.6
Liberal	Henry Augustus Haslam	5,266	10.7	n/a
Communist	Harry Pollitt	1,451	2.9	n/a
Majority		28,794	58.6	27.6
Turnout			84.2	+5.4
Labour hold		Swing	+13.8	

Sedgefield
Party	Candidate	Votes	%	±%
Labour	John Herriotts	15,749	47.7	+ 0.4
Unionist	Leonard Ropner	13,043	39.5	– 13.2
Liberal	William Leeson	4,236	12.8	n/a
Majority		2,706	8.2	+ 2.8
Turnout			83.0	– 2.4
Labour gain from Unionist		Swing		

Sevenoaks
Party	Candidate	Votes	%	±%
Unionist	Hilton Young	16,767	53.7	−8.2
Liberal	Edgar Stratton Liddiard	7,844	25.1	−13.0
Labour	Hamilton Fyfe	6,634	21.2	n/a
Majority		8,923	28.6	+4.8
Turnout		31,245		
Unionist hold		Swing	+2.4	

Sheffield Attercliffe
Party	Candidate	Votes	%	±%
Labour	Cecil Wilson	19,152	60.3	−3.3
Unionist	Wilfred Barnard Faraday	6,190	19.5	−16.9
Liberal	Thomas Neville	4,652	14.7	n/a
Communist	George Fletcher	1,731	5.5	n/a
Majority		12,962	40.8	+13.6
Turnout			75.4	
Labour hold		Swing	+6.8	

Sheffield Brightside
Party	Candidate	Votes	%	±%
Labour	Arthur Ponsonby	20,277	55.2	−0.2
Unionist	R.I. Money	9,828	26.8	−17.8
Liberal	William Lambert	6,621	18.0	n/a
Majority		10,449	28.4	+17.6
Turnout			77.3	−1.6
Labour hold		Swing		

Sheffield Central
Party	Candidate	Votes	%	±%
Labour	Philip Hoffman	19,183	59.1	+8.5
Unionist	John Ralph Patientins Warde-Aldam	13,284	40.9	−8.5
Majority		5,899	18.2	17.0
Turnout			74.1	−0.4
Labour gain from Unionist		Swing	+8.5	

Sheffield Ecclesall
Party	Candidate	Votes	%	±%
Unionist	Samuel Roberts	17,165	55.3	−30.7
Labour	Harry Samuels	7,983	25.7	n/a
Liberal	Robert Slack Wells	5,898	19.0	n/a
Majority		9,182	29.6	−42.4
Turnout			75.1	+3.1
Unionist hold		Swing	n/a	

Sheffield Hallam
Party	Candidate	Votes	%	±%
Unionist	Louis Smith	18,920	60.9	−2.8
Labour	Basil Rawson	12,133	39.1	+2.8
Majority		6,787	21.8	−5.6
Turnout			73.2	−4.6
Unionist hold		Swing	-2.8	

Sheffield Hillsborough
Party	Candidate	Votes	%	±%
Labour	A. V. Alexander	20,941	57.3	+0.4
Unionist	Albert Harland	10,489	28.8	−14.3
Liberal	Edward Hugh Frederick Morris	5,053	13.9	n/a
Majority		10,452	28.5	+14.7
Turnout			77.6	−0.3
Labour hold		Swing	+7.3	

Sheffield Park
Party	Candidate	Votes	%	±%
Labour	George Lathan	20,304	51.4	+6.2
Unionist	Richard Storry Deans	13,597	34.5	−10.7
Liberal	Ernest Edgar Dalton	5,560	14.1	n/a
Majority		6,707	16.9	16.9
Turnout			79.2	−1.9
Labour gain from Unionist		Swing	+8.4	

Shipley
Party	Candidate	Votes	%	±%
Labour	William Mackinder	18,654	42.3	+6.3
Unionist	Robert Clough	13,693	31.1	−3.1
Liberal	Francis Wrigley Hirst	11,712	26.6	−3.2
Majority		4,961	11.2	+9.4
Turnout			85.0	−1.4
Labour hold		Swing	+4.7	

Shoreditch
Party	Candidate	Votes	%	±%
Labour	Ernest Thurtle	20,552	51.5	−1.5
Liberal	Harold Reckitt	12,981	32.6	−14.1
Unionist	Antony Bulwer-Lytton	6,334	15.9	n/a
Majority		7,571	18.9	+12.9
Turnout		39,867	64.3	+4.8
Labour hold		Swing	+6.4	

Shrewsbury
Party	Candidate	Votes	%	±%
Unionist	Arthur Duckworth	14,586	48.6	−7.0
Liberal	Joseph Sunlight	11,794	39.3	+1.7
Labour	A.A. Beach	3,662	12.2	+5.4
Majority		2,792	9.3	−8.7
Turnout				
Unionist hold		Swing	-4.4	

Silvertown
Party	Candidate	Votes	%	±%
Labour	Jack Jones	23,451	85.7	+4.6
Unionist	William Teeling	3,903	14.3	−4.6
Majority		19,548	71.4	+9.2
Turnout				
Labour hold		Swing	-4.6	

Skipton
Party	Candidate	Votes	%	±%
Unionist	Ernest Roy Bird	16,588	39.5	−6.5
Labour	John Davies	13,088	31.2	+4.7
Liberal	Thomas Woffenden	12,320	29.3	+1.8
Majority		3,500	8.3	−10.2
Turnout			83.4	−0.4
Unionist hold		Swing	-5.6	

Smethwick
Party	Candidate	Votes	%	±%
Labour	Oswald Mosley	19,550	54.8	+2.5
Unionist	Roy Wise	12,210	34.2	−13.5
Liberal	Maude Egerton Marshall	3,909	11.0	n/a
Majority		7,340	20.6	+16.0
Turnout		35,669	78.9	+0.7
Labour hold		Swing	+8.0	

South Molton
Party	Candidate	Votes	%	±%
Liberal	George Lambert	15,072	48.1	−0.6
Unionist	Cedric Drewe	13,567	43.2	−8.1
Labour	Rudolph Putnam Messel	2,731	8.7	n/a
Majority		1,505	4.9	7.5
Turnout			87.4	+2.1
Liberal gain from Unionist		Swing	+3.8	

South Shields
Party	Candidate	Votes	%	±%
Labour	James Chuter Ede	18,938	42.2	+0.1
Liberal	Harold Burge Robson	18,898	42.0	−15.9
Unionist	William Nunn	7,110	15.8	n/a
Majority		40	0.2	16.0
Turnout			72.9	−2.4
Labour gain from Liberal		Swing	+8.0	

Southampton (2 seats)
Party	Candidate	Votes	%	±%
Labour	Tommy Lewis	32,249	22.4	
Labour	Ralph Morley	31,252	21.7	
Unionist	Ian Maitland	27,898	19.4	
Unionist	Alec Cunningham-Reid	26,801	18.6	
Liberal	John Howard Whitehouse	12,966	9.0	
Liberal	Arthur Thomas Lamsley	12,836	8.9	
Majority		3,354	2.3	
Turnout		73,477	70.9	
Labour gain from Unionist		Swing		

Southend
Party	Candidate	Votes	%	±%
Unionist	Gwendolen Guinness	27,605	55.8	−6.7
Liberal	Dougall Meston	21,884	44.2	+15.1
Majority		5,721	11.6	−21.8
Turnout			67.0	−12.3
Unionist hold		Swing	-10.9	

Southport
Party	Candidate	Votes	%	±%
Unionist	Godfrey Dalrymple-White	21,161	48.3	−12.7
Liberal	Cecil Beresford Ramage	17,220	39.4	+0.4
Labour	Arthur Leonard Williams	5,380	12.3	n/a
Majority		3,941	8.9	−13.1
Turnout		43,761	79.6	+1.2
Unionist hold		Swing	-6.6	

Southwark Central
Party	Candidate	Votes	%	±%
Labour	Harry Day	13,318	52.3	+12.3
Unionist	Edward Keeling	6,256	24.6	−1.3
Liberal	James Robert Want	5,878	23.1	−11.0
Majority		7,062	27.7	+21.8
Labour hold		Swing	+6.8	

Southwark North
Party	Candidate	Votes	%	±%
Labour	George Isaacs	9,660	45.8	+2.0
Liberal	Edward Strauss	9,228	43.8	+5.5
Unionist	Marcus Samuel	2,198	10.4	−7.5
Majority		432	2.0	−3.5
Turnout			65.2	−6.3
Labour hold		Swing	-1.8	

Southwark South East
Party	Candidate	Votes	%	±%
Labour	Thomas Naylor	13,527	60.4	+6.1
Liberal	William John Squire	4,766	21.3	+10.1
Unionist	Evelyn George Harcourt Powell	4,086	18.3	−16.2
Majority		8,761	39.1	+19.3
Turnout			58.9	−9.2
Labour hold		Swing	-2.0	

Sowerby
Party	Candidate	Votes	%	±%
Labour	William John Tout	14,223	37.2	+7.1
Unionist	Arthur Colegate	12,057	31.6	−6.2
Liberal	Thomas George Graham	11,890	31.2	−0.9
Majority		2,166	5.6	11.3
Turnout			83.4	+0.2
Labour gain from Unionist		Swing	+6.6	

Spelthorne
Party	Candidate	Votes	%	±%
Unionist	Philip Pilditch	19,177	49.36	−20.0
Labour	F. Wilson Temple	11,946	30.75	+0.1
Liberal	William A.J. Hillier	7,727	19.89	n/a
Majority		7,231	18.61	−20.1
Turnout		38,850	69.02	+4.4
Unionist hold		Swing	-7.8	

Spen Valley
Party	Candidate	Votes	%	±%
Liberal	John Simon	22,039	51.7	−5.2
Labour	Herbert Elvin	20,300	47.7	+4.6
Communist	Shaukat Usmani	242	0.6	n/a
Majority		1,739	4.0	−9.8
Turnout			79.6	+0.4
Liberal hold		Swing	-4.9	

Spennymoor
Party	Candidate	Votes	%	±%
Labour	Joseph Batey	20,858	71.8	
Unionist	Francis Page Gourlay	8,202	28.2	
Majority		12,656	43.6	
Turnout		29,060		
Labour hold		Swing		

St Albans
Party	Candidate	Votes	%	±%
Unionist	Francis Fremantle	20,436	48.1	−19.4
Labour	Mary Monica Whately	11,699	27.6	−4.9
Liberal	George Gordon Honeyman	10,299	24.3	n/a
Majority		8,737	20.5	−14.5
Turnout		42,434	72.6	+2.3
Labour hold		Swing	-7.2	

St Helens
Party	Candidate	Votes	%	±%
Labour	James Sexton	27,665	58.6	+2.8
Unionist	Richard Austin Spencer	19,560	41.4	−2.8
Majority		8,105	17.2	+5.6
Turnout			78.3	−4.8
Labour hold		Swing	+2.8	

St Ives
Party	Candidate	Votes	%	±%
Liberal	Walter Runciman	12,443	43.2	−3.8
Unionist	Andrew Caird	11,411	39.7	−13.3
Labour	William Edward Arnold-Forster	4,920	17.1	n/a
Majority		1,032	3.5	9.5
Turnout		28,774	76.5	+7.4
Liberal gain from Unionist		Swing	+4.8	

St. Marylebone
Party	Candidate	Votes	%	±%
Unionist	Rennell Rodd	26,247	61.4	−12.1
Labour	David Amyas Ross	10,960	25.7	−0.8
Liberal	Cyril Moses Picciotto	5,520	12.9	n/a
Majority		15,287	35.7	−11.3
Turnout			57.3	−8.2
Unionist hold		Swing	-5.6	

St Pancras North
Party	Candidate	Votes	%	±%
Labour	James Marley	17,458	48.5	+4.4
Unionist	Ian Fraser	14,343	39.9	−6.8
Liberal	Frederick L. Coysh	4,177	11.6	+2.4
Majority		3,115	8.6	11.2
Turnout			76.0	−3.2
Labour gain from Unionist		Swing	+5.6	

St Pancras South East
Party	Candidate	Votes	%	±%
Labour	Herbert Romeril	13,173	47.9	+2.4
Unionist	Alfred Beit	10,543	38.3	−16.2
Liberal	Elizabeth Edwardes	3,798	13.8	n/a
Majority		2,630	9.6	18.6
Turnout			66.8	−5.8
Labour gain from Unionist		Swing	+9.3	

St Pancras South West
Party	Candidate	Votes	%	±%
Labour	William Carter	12,010	45.6	+3.5
Unionist	Patrick Spens	10,231	38.8	−19.1
Liberal	Haydn Davies	4,103	15.6	n/a
Majority		1,779	6.8	22.6
Turnout			62.0	−4.9
Labour gain from Unionist		Swing	+11.3	

Stafford
Party	Candidate	Votes	%	±%
Unionist	William Ormsby-Gore	12,324	45.1	
Labour	Leonard Smith	10,011	36.6	
Liberal	Arthur Stanley Leyland	5,000	18.3	
Majority		2,313	8.5	
Turnout				
Unionist hold		Swing		

Stalybridge and Hyde
Party	Candidate	Votes	%	±%
Labour	Hugh Hartley Lawrie	20,343	41.1	+7.4
Unionist	Edmund Walter Hanbury Wood	17,983	36.3	−7.9
Liberal	Percy Herbert Jones	11,186	22.6	+0.5
Majority		2,360	4.8	15.3
Turnout			86.4	+2.4
Labour gain from Unionist		Swing	+7.6	

Stockport (2 seats)
Party	Candidate	Votes	%	±%
Labour	Arnold Townend	30,955	27.4	+2.6
Unionist	Samuel Hammersley	29,043	25.7	−4.0
Liberal	Henry Fildes	22,595	20.0	n/a
Unionist	Edwin Noel Lingen-Barker	22,047	19.5	−12.1
Independent Liberal	Charles Royle	8,355	7.4	−6.5
Majority		6,448	5.7	
Turnout		71,410	84.6	−1.3
Labour gain from Unionist		Swing	+7.3	
Unionist hold		Swing		

Stockton-on-Tees
Party	Candidate	Votes	%	±%
Labour	Frederick Fox Riley	18,961	41.2	+8.1
Unionist	Harold Macmillan	16,572	36.1	−5.9
Liberal	John Cecil Hayes	10,407	22.7	−2.2
Majority		2,389	5.1	14.0
Turnout				
Labour gain from Unionist		Swing	+7.0	

Stoke Newington
Party	Candidate	Votes	%	±%
Unionist	George Jones	9,030	38.0	−18.7
Liberal	Frederick William Norwood	7,958	33.6	+8.4
Labour	F. L. Kerran	6,723	28.4	+10.3
Majority		1,072	4.4	−27.1
Turnout			70.0	−6.0
Unionist hold		Swing	-13.1	

Stoke-on-Trent
Party	Candidate	Votes	%	±%
Labour	Cynthia Mosley	26,548	58.7	+16.0
Liberal	John Ward	18,698	41.3	−16.0
Majority		7,850	17.4	32.0
Turnout		45,246		
Labour gain from Liberal		Swing	+16.0	

Stone
Party	Candidate	Votes	%	±%
Unionist	Joseph Lamb	13,965	44.0	
Liberal	Walter Meakin	8,975	28.3	
Labour	George Belt	8,792	27.7	
Majority		4,990	15.7	
Turnout			76.9	
Unionist hold		Swing		

Stourbridge
Party	Candidate	Votes	%	±%
Labour	Wilfred Wellock	21,343	38.4	+3.6
Unionist	Stanley Reed	17,675	31.8	−7.7
Liberal	Donald Finnemore	16,537	29.8	+4.1
Majority		3,668	6.6	11.3
Turnout				
Labour gain from Unionist		Swing	5.6	

Stratford
Party	Candidate	Votes	%	±%
Labour	Thomas Groves	16,665	58.6	
Unionist	Henry Procter	8,018	28.2	
Liberal	Albert Charles Crane	3,779	13.3	
Majority		8,647	30.4	
Turnout				
Labour hold		Swing		

Streatham
Party	Candidate	Votes	%	±%
Unionist	William Lane-Mitchell	19,024	57.0	−11.5
Liberal	Percy Lionel Edwin Rawlins	8,191	24.6	+6.9
Labour	Fred Hughes	6,134	18.4	n/a
Majority		10,833	32.4	−18.4
Turnout				
Unionist hold		Swing	-9.2	

Stretford
Party	Candidate	Votes	%	±%
Independent	Thomas Robinson	25,799	58.6	−5.8
Labour	Frank Anderson	18,199	41.4	+5.8
Majority		7,600	17.2	
Turnout		43,998	75.2	
Independent hold		Swing	-5.8	

Stroud
Party	Candidate	Votes	%	±%
Unionist	Frank Nelson	17,700	44.4	−9.8
Liberal	Arthur Stanton	11,728	29.5	+8.9
Labour	F.E. White	10,384	26.1	+0.9
Majority		5,972	14.9	−18.7
Turnout			81.6	+2.7
Unionist hold		Swing	-9.4	

Sudbury
Party	Candidate	Votes	%	±%
Unionist	Henry Burton	9,715	40.2	−13.4
Liberal	Alan Sainsbury	8,309	34.4	−12.0
Labour	W. Jack Shingfield	6,147	25.4	n/a
Majority		1,406	5.8	−1.4
Turnout			75.9	+2.6
Unionist hold		Swing	-0.7	

Sunderland (2 seats)
Party	Candidate	Votes	%	±%
Labour	Marion Phillips	31,794	19.5	
Labour	Alfred Smith	31,085	19.0	
Unionist	Walter Raine	29,180	17.9	
Unionist	Luke Thompson	28,937	17.7	
Liberal	Elizabeth Morgan	21,300	13.0	
Liberal	John Pratt	21,142	12.9	
Majority		1,905	1.1	
Turnout		82,640	81.1	
Labour gain from Unionist		Swing		

Surrey East
Party	Candidate	Votes	%	±%
Unionist	James Galbraith	19,578	60.9	
Liberal	Ida Swinburne	7,435	23.1	
Labour	Robert Oscar Mennell	5,152	16.0	
Majority		12,143	37.8	
Turnout				
Unionist hold		Swing		

Swindon
Party	Candidate	Votes	%	±%
Labour	Christopher Addison	16,885	43.7	
Unionist	Reginald Mitchell Banks	14,724	38.1	
Liberal	Frank Crane Thornborough	7,060	18.3	
Majority		2,161	5.6	
Turnout				
Labour gain from Unionist		Swing		

Tamworth
Party	Candidate	Votes	%	±%
Unionist	Edward Mauger Iliffe	29,807	67.4	
Labour	George Horwill	14,402	32.6	
Majority		15,405	34.8	
Turnout			73.6	
Unionist hold		Swing		

Taunton
Party	Candidate	Votes	%	±%
Unionist	Andrew Gault	15,083	45.9	−6.2
Liberal	Walter Rea	11,121	33.9	−4.9
Labour	Joseph Sparks	6,615	20.2	+11.1
Majority		3,962	12.0	−1.3
Turnout			82.2	−3.4
Unionist hold		Swing	-0.6	

Tavistock
Party	Candidate	Votes	%	±%
Unionist	Wallace Duffield Wright	14,192	44.7	−8.1
Liberal	Hilda Runciman	14,040	44.1	−3.1
Labour	Richard Davies	3,574	11.2	n/a
Majority		152	0.6	−5.0
Turnout				
Unionist hold		Swing	-2.5	

Thirsk and Malton
Party	Candidate	Votes	%	±%
Unionist	Robert Turton	16,084	59.2	−6.5
Liberal	Thomas Sunley	11,069	40.8	+6.5
Majority		5,015	18.5	−13.0
Turnout		27,153	73.7	
Unionist hold		Swing	+6.5	

Thornbury
Party	Candidate	Votes	%	±%
Unionist	Derrick Gunston	13,914	34.0	−8.8
Liberal	John Adam Day	13,614	33.2	−2.1
Labour	Godfrey Elton	13,445	32.8	+10.9
Majority		300	0.8	−6.7
Turnout		40,973	82.5	+3.0
Unionist hold		Swing	-3.4	

Tiverton
Party	Candidate	Votes	%	±%
Unionist	Gilbert Acland-Troyte	15,423	50.5	−2.7
Liberal	Dingle Foot	12,908	42.3	−4.5
Labour	Heyman Wreford-Glanville	2,199	7.2	n/a
Majority		2,515	8.2	+1.8
Turnout			86.2	−4.0
Unionist hold		Swing	+0.9	

Tonbridge
Party	Candidate	Votes	%	±%
Unionist	Herbert Henry Spender-Clay	19,018	49.8	−8.4
Liberal	Gordon Alchin	10,025	26.2	+6.4
Labour	W F Toynbee	9,149	24.0	+2.0
Majority		8,993	23.6	−12.6
Turnout			72.3	−2.0
Unionist hold		Swing	-7.4	

Torquay
Party	Candidate	Votes	%	±%
Unionist	Charles Williams	21,690	49.7	−5.5
Liberal	Richard Acland	16,337	37.5	+1.1
Labour	Hubert Medland	5,576	12.8	+3.8
Majority		5,353	12.2	−6.6
Turnout			81.7	−2.7
Unionist hold		Swing	-3.3	

Totnes
Party	Candidate	Votes	%	±%
Unionist	Samuel Harvey	21,673	47.8	−5.9
Liberal	Philip Foale Rowsell	17,790	39.3	−0.9
Labour	Kate Florence Spurrell	5,828	12.9	+6.8
Majority		3,883	8.5	−5.0
Turnout			83.1	−3.0
Unionist hold		Swing	-2.5	

Tottenham North
Party	Candidate	Votes	%	±%
Labour	Robert Morrison	20884	54.0	+3.0
Unionist	Harold J Soloman	11,231	29.1	n/a
Liberal	Angus Holden	6,535	16.9	n/a
Majority		9,653	24.9	+22.9
Turnout			73.8	+2.5
Labour hold		Swing	n/a	

Tottenham South
Party	Candidate	Votes	%	±%
Labour	Frederick Messer	14,423	46.5	−0.6
Unionist	Patrick Bernard Malone	9,701	31.3	−21.6
Liberal	William John Stonestreet	6,407	20.7	n/a
Communist	Henry Thomas W Sara	490	1.6	n/a
Majority		4,722	15.1	21.0
Turnout			67.5	−4.4
Labour gain from Unionist		Swing	+10.5	

Twickenham
Party	Candidate	Votes	%	±%
Unionist	William Joynson-Hicks	21,087	48.5	
Labour	Thomas Jackson Mason	15,121	34.8	
Liberal	Frederick Paterson	7,246	16.7	
Majority		5,966	13.7	
Turnout			69.8	
Unionist hold		Swing		

Tynemouth
Party	Candidate	Votes	%	±%
Unionist	Alexander Russell	11,785	37.0	−8.2
Liberal	Richard Irvin	10,545	33.1	+5.7
Labour	John Stuart Barr	9,503	29.9	+2.5
Majority		1,240	3.9	−13.9
Turnout			83.3	−1.3
Unionist hold		Swing	-7.0	

Upton
Party	Candidate	Votes	%	±%
Labour	Benjamin Walter Gardner	14,703	49.0	+3.0
Unionist	Morgan Morgan	9,681	32.3	−21.7
Liberal	W. J. Austin	5,607	18.7	n/a
Majority		5,022	16.7	+24.7
Turnout			70.8	−4.0
Labour gain from Unionist		Swing	+12.3	

Uxbridge
Party	Candidate	Votes	%	±%
Unionist	John Llewellin	17,770	41.2	−10.9
Labour	Reginald Bridgeman	16,422	38.2	+5.6
Liberal	Richard Christian Cecil James Binney	8,847	20.6	+5.3
Majority		1,348	3.0	−16.5
Turnout			72.2	+0.4
Unionist hold		Swing	-8.2	

Wakefield
Party	Candidate	Votes	%	±%
Labour	George Henry Sherwood	13,393	48.8	+0.9
Unionist	Geoffrey Ellis	10,180	37.1	−15.0
Liberal	Leonard Parish	3,875	14.1	n/a
Majority		3,213	11.7	15.9
Turnout			85.6	+5.8
Labour gain from Unionist		Swing	+7.9	

Wallasey
Party	Candidate	Votes	%	±%
Unionist	Robert Burton-Chadwick	21,457	46.0	−26.4
Liberal	Hubert Phillips	13,628	29.2	n/a
Labour	John Mack	11,544	24.8	−2.8
Majority		7,829	16.8	−28.0
Turnout			77.6	+2.9
Unionist hold		Swing	n/a	

Wallsend
Party	Candidate	Votes	%	±%
Labour	Margaret Bondfield	20,057	49.5	−2.9
Unionist	Walter Waring	12,952	31.9	−15.7
Liberal	Samuel Phillips	6,790	16.7	n/a
Communist	Wal Hannington	744	1.8	n/a
Majority		7,105	17.7	+12.8
Turnout			80.2	
Labour hold		Swing	+6.4	

Walsall
Party	Candidate	Votes	%	±%
Labour	John James McShane	20,524	39.6	+10.9
Unionist	William Preston	15,818	30.6	−7.3
Liberal	Thomas James Macnamara	15,425	29.8	−2.0
Majority		4,706	9.0	15.1
Turnout			85.9	
Labour gain from Unionist		Swing	+9.1	

Walthamstow East
Party	Candidate	Votes	%	±%
Labour	Harry Wallace	11,039	39.6	+4.2
Unionist	James Hope	9,665	34.7	−13.8
Liberal	Joseph Samuel Bridges	7,145	25.7	+9.6
Majority		1,374	4.9	18.0
Turnout			73.1	−4.9
Labour gain from Unionist		Swing	+9.0	

Walthamstow West
Party	Candidate	Votes	%	±%
Labour	Valentine McEntee	16,050	54.0	−4.9
Liberal	Horace Crawfurd	9,470	31.9	−19.0
Unionist	Frederick C Bramston	4,184	14.1	n/a
Majority		6,580	22.1	+14.1
Turnout			73.3	−2.2
Labour gain from Liberal		Swing	+7.0	

Wandsworth Central
Party	Candidate	Votes	%	±%
Labour	Archibald Church	11,404	41.8	+3.4
Unionist	Henry Jackson	11,104	40.7	−20.9
Liberal	Arthur Wansbrough Duthie	4,784	17.5	n/a
Majority		300	1.1	n/a
Turnout		27,292	69.5	−1.3
Labour gain from Unionist		Swing	-12.3	

Wansbeck
Party	Candidate	Votes	%	±%
Labour	George Shield	27,930	54.4	
Unionist	Bernard Cruddas	17,056	33.2	
Liberal	Frederick Wandby	6,330	12.3	n/a
Majority		10,874	21.2	
Turnout		51,316		
Labour hold		Swing		

Warrington
Party	Candidate	Votes	%	±%
Labour	Charles Dukes	21,610	50.6	+3.0
Unionist	Noel Goldie	18,025	42.2	−10.2
Liberal	Alison Garland	3,070	7.2	n/a
Majority		3,585	8.4	13.2
Turnout				–
Labour gain from Unionist		Swing	+6.6	

Warwick and Leamington
Party	Candidate	Votes	%	±%
Unionist	Anthony Eden	23,045	47.6	−12.6
Liberal	Walter Dingley	17,585	36.4	−3.4
Labour	Charles George Garton	7,741	16.0	n/a
Majority		5,460	11.2	−9.2
Turnout			77.5	+3.9
Unionist hold		Swing	-4.6	

Waterloo
Party	Candidate	Votes	%	±%
Unionist	Malcolm Bullock	17,299	52.1	
Labour	John Clifford Leigh	8,142	24.5	
Liberal	Frederic Aked Sellers	7,728	23.3	n/a
Majority		9,157	27.6	
Turnout		33,169		
Unionist hold		Swing		

Watford
Party	Candidate	Votes	%	±%
Unionist	Dennis Herbert	18,583	45.9	−8.8
Liberal	Edward Terrell	12,288	30.3	+11.6
Labour	Herman Macdonald	9,665	23.8	−2.8
Majority		6,295	15.6	−12.5
Turnout			72.4	−0.7
Unionist hold		Swing	-10.2	

Wednesbury
Party	Candidate	Votes	%	±%
Labour	Alfred Short	22,420	50.1	−0.4
Unionist	Harold Rubin	17,089	38.1	−11.4
Liberal	John Henry Stockdale	5,249	11.7	n/a
Independent	Thomas Gee	61	0.1	n/a
Majority		5,331	12.0	+11.0
Turnout			89.7	−0.2
Labour hold		Swing	+5.5	

Wellingborough
Party	Candidate	Votes	%	±%
Labour	George Dallas	15,300	42.2	+2.2
Liberal	Richard Pattinson Winfrey	11,255	31.0	+2.2
Unionist	Archibald James	9,703	26.8	−4.4
Majority		4,045	11.2	−+2.4
Turnout			83.3	−0.7
Labour hold		Swing	+0.0	

Wells
Party	Candidate	Votes	%	±%
Unionist	Anthony Muirhead	13,026	43.6	−9.0
Liberal	Arthur Hobhouse	12,382	41.4	+5.3
Labour	R D Q Davies	4,472	15.0	+3.7
Majority		644	2.2	−14.3
Turnout			82.5	+0.3
Unionist hold		Swing	-7.2	

Wentworth
Party	Candidate	Votes	%	±%
Labour	George Henry Hirst	35,276	75.1	n/a
Liberal	Philip Brady Nicholson	7,955	17.0	n/a
Unionist	Benjamin Hubert Oates	3,684	7.9	n/a
Majority		27,321	58.1	n/a
Turnout			80.3	n/a
Labour hold		Swing	n/a	

West Bromwich
Party	Candidate	Votes	%	±%
Labour	Frederick Roberts	19,621	52.0	
Unionist	J I Chesshire	10,943	29.0	
Liberal	William Ramage	7,119	18.9	
Majority		8,678	23.1	
Turnout				
Labour hold		Swing		

Westbury
Party	Candidate	Votes	%	±%
Unionist	Richard Long	12,907	38.8	−5.4
Liberal	Harcourt Johnstone	12,840	38.7	+1.0
Labour	George Ward	7,458	22.5	+4.4
Majority		67	0.1	−6.4
Turnout			87.1	+
Unionist hold		Swing	-3.2	

Westhoughton
Party	Candidate	Votes	%	±%
Labour	Rhys Davies	22,305	61.5	
Unionist	James Wain Lomax	9,855	27.2	
Liberal	Ernest Everett Canney	4,132	11.4	
Majority		12,450	34.3	
Turnout				
Labour hold		Swing		

Westminster Abbey
Party	Candidate	Votes	%	±%
Unionist	Otho Nicholson	18,195	74.0	−6.6
Labour	James MacDonnell	6,406	26.0	+6.6
Majority		11,789	48.0	−13.2
Turnout			50.7	−7.7
Unionist hold		Swing	-6.6	

Westminster St George's
Party	Candidate	Votes	%	±%
Unionist	Laming Worthington-Evans	22,448	78.1	n/a
Labour	Joseph George Butler	6,294	21.9	n/a
Majority		16,154	56.2	n/a
Turnout		28,742	53.3	n/a
Unionist hold		Swing	n/a	

Westmorland
Party	Candidate	Votes	%	±%
Unionist	Oliver Stanley	17,101	49.6	−21.6
Liberal	William Gretton Ward	13,223	38.3	n/a
Labour	W. Bone	4,184	12.1	−16.1
Majority		3,878	11.3	−31.1
Turnout			81.9	+1.7
Unionist hold		Swing	n/a	

Weston-super-Mare
Party	Candidate	Votes	%	±%
Unionist	John Erskine	21,898	51.1	−3.6
Liberal	William Morse	16,219	37.8	−3.0
Labour	Constance Elizabeth Borrett	4,766	11.1	+6.7
Majority		5,679	13.2	−0.6
Turnout		42,883	77.8	−2.1
Unionist hold		Swing	-0.3	

Whitechapel and St. George's
Party	Candidate	Votes	%	±%
Labour	Harry Gosling	13,701	63.2	+4.7
Liberal	Frank H. Sedgwick	4,521	20.8	−20.7
Unionist	Loel Guinness	3,478	16.0	n/a
Majority		9,180	42.4	+25.4
Turnout			60.3	−7.7
Labour hold		Swing	+12.7	

Whitehaven
Party	Candidate	Votes	%	±%
Labour	M. Philips Price	14,034	46.8	
Unionist	Robert Spear Hudson	12,382	41.3	
Liberal	Henry Darnley Naylor	3,558	11.9	n/a
Majority		1,652	5.5	
Turnout				
Labour gain from Unionist		Swing		

Widnes
Party	Candidate	Votes	%	±%
Labour	Alexander Gordon Cameron	19,125	51.0	+4.7
Unionist	Christopher Clayton	18,376	49.0	−4.7
Majority		749	2.0	9.4
Turnout			84.8	−1.0
Labour gain from Unionist		Swing	+4.7	

Wigan
Party	Candidate	Votes	%	±%
Labour	John Parkinson	27,462	58.5	
Unionist	Ernest Barlow	18,144	38.7	
Communist	Frank Bright	1,307	2.8	n/a
Majority		9,318	19.8	
Turnout		46,913		
Labour hold		Swing		

Willesden East
Party	Candidate	Votes	%	±%
Unionist	Daniel Somerville	17,090	40.4	−9.8
Labour	William Davies Lloyd	13,977	33.1	+8.4
Liberal	Maurice Gordon Liverman	11,190	26.5	+1.4
Majority		3,113	7.3	−17.8
Turnout			69.3	−6.7
Unionist hold		Swing	-9.1	

Willesden West
Party	Candidate	Votes	%	±%
Labour	Samuel Viant	20,583	52.3	+5.0
Unionist	Malcolm McCorquodale	12,779	32.4	−9.6
Liberal	Arthur Lewis Leighton	6,038	15.3	+5.6
Majority		7,804	19.9	+15.6
Turnout			73.4	−4.2
Labour hold		Swing	+7.8	

Wimbledon
Party	Candidate	Votes	%	±%
Unionist	John Power	21,902	53.4	
Labour	Tom Braddock	9,924	24.2	
Liberal	Arthur Peters	9,202	22.4	n/a
Majority		11,978	29.2	
Turnout				
Unionist hold		Swing		

Winchester
Party	Candidate	Votes	%	±%
Unionist	George Hennessy	17,560	44.8	
Labour	Robert Arthur Lyster	14,326	36.6	
Liberal	Frances Josephy	7,278	18.6	
Majority		3,234	8.2	
Turnout				
Unionist hold		Swing		

Windsor
Party	Candidate	Votes	%	±%
Unionist	Annesley Somerville	20,564	57.2	−21.5
Liberal	Ernest Haylor	11,314	31.5	n/a
Labour	Alfred Hugh Chilton	4,049	11.3	−10.0
Majority		9,250	25.8	−31.6
Turnout		35,927	67.6	+1.0
Unionist hold		Swing	n/a	

Wirral
Party	Candidate	Votes	%	±%
Unionist	John Grace	23,522	47.5	−12.7
Liberal	Stephen Roxby Dodds	15,158	30.6	−9.2
Labour	George Beardsworth	10,876	21.9	n/a
Majority		8,364	16.9	−3.5
Turnout			78.7	−0.3
Unionist hold		Swing	-1.8	

Wolverhampton East
Party	Candidate	Votes	%	±%
Liberal	Geoffrey Mander	15,391	44.8	+2.7
Unionist	Patrick Buchan-Hepburn	10,163	29.5	−8.6
Labour	D Rowland Williams	8,840	25.7	+5.9
Majority		5,228	15.3	+11.3
Turnout			81.5	+0.9
Liberal hold		Swing	+5.7	

Wolverhampton West
Party	Candidate	Votes	%	±%
Labour	William Brown	21,103	49.1	+0.3
Unionist	Robert Bird	17,237	40.2	−11.2
Liberal	George. H. Roberts	4,580	10.7	n/a
Majority		3,866	8.9	n/a
Turnout		42,920	84.1	−1.8
Labour gain from Unionist		Swing	+6.8	

Wood Green
Party	Candidate	Votes	%	±%
Unionist	Godfrey Locker-Lampson	24,821	47.6	−10.3
Liberal	Hew Fraser	14,995	28.7	+5.7
Labour	E P Bell	12,360	23.7	+0.7
Majority		9,826	18.9	−16.0
Turnout			73.0	−3.3
Unionist hold		Swing	-8.0	

Woodbridge
Party	Candidate	Votes	%	±%
Unionist	Clavering Fison	15,231	48.1	−6.8
Liberal	Roger Fulford	10,904	34.5	+5.8
Labour	Leonard Spero	5,507	17.4	+1.0
Majority		4,327	13.6	−12.6
Turnout			73.3	−1.0
Unionist hold		Swing	-6.3	

Woolwich East
Party	Candidate	Votes	%	±%
Labour	Harry Snell	20,447	63.2	+4.8
Unionist	Edward Shrapnell-Smith	11,906	36.8	−4.8
Majority		8,541	26.4	+9.6
Turnout			75.6	−6.0
Labour hold		Swing	+4.8	

Woolwich West
Party	Candidate	Votes	%	±%
Unionist	Kingsley Wood	17,296	45.1	
Labour	William Barefoot	16,964	44.2	
Liberal	Arthur Stanley Phillips	4,140	10.7	
Majority		332	0.9	
Turnout				
Unionist hold		Swing		

Worcester
Party	Candidate	Votes	%	±%
Unionist	Crawford Greene	13,182	47.2	−8.8
Labour	Kenneth Lindsay	8,208	29.3	+14.0
Liberal	Richard Robert Fairbairn	6,588	23.5	−5.2
Majority		4,974	17.9	−9.4
Turnout			65.4	−18.0
Unionist hold		Swing	-11.4	

Workington
Party	Candidate	Votes	%	±%
Labour	Thomas Cape	20,591	65.2	
Unionist	John Mellor	10,995	34.8	
Majority		9,596	30.4	
Turnout		31,586		
Labour hold		Swing		

The Wrekin
Party	Candidate	Votes	%	±%
Labour	Edith Picton-Turbervill	14,569	44.4	+0.1
Unionist	Thomas Oakley	11,707	35.6	−20.1
Liberal	W. E. Boyes	6,576	20.0	n/a
Majority		2,862	8.8	20.2
Turnout			76.7	+2.5
Labour gain from Unionist		Swing	+10.1	

Wycombe
Party	Candidate	Votes	%	±%
Unionist	Alfred Knox	23,231	47.4	−7.4
Liberal	Leonard John Humphrey	16,929	34.5	+1.5
Labour	R Townsend	8,899	18.1	+5.9
Majority		6,302	12.9	−8.9
Turnout		49,059	71.1	−6.9
Unionist hold		Swing	-4.5	

Yeovil
Party	Candidate	Votes	%	±%
Unionist	George Davies	15,526	41.1	−7.2
Liberal	Percy Holt Heffer	14,679	38.8	+7.7
Labour	Francis Douglas	7,609	20.1	−0.5
Majority		847	2.3	−14.9
Turnout		37,814	83.4	−0.2
Unionist hold		Swing	-7.5	

York
Party	Candidate	Votes	%	±%
Labour	Frederick George Burgess	20,663	45.0	+1.2
Unionist	John Marriott	17,363	37.8	−18.4
Liberal	Douglas Crockatt	7,907	17.2	n/a
Majority		3,300	7.2	19.6
Turnout			85.1	+0.3
Labour gain from Unionist		Swing	+9.8	
