= Art of War 4 =

2007 mixed martial arts event

Art of War Undisputed Arena Fighting Championship: Art of War 4
- Date: October 27, 2007
- Venue: Grand Casino Tunica
- City: Tunica, Mississippi
- Attendance: 5,000

Event chronology
Art of War 3	Art of War Undisputed Arena Fighting Championship: Art of War 4	AOW - Gis vs Pros

Art of War Undisputed Arena Fighting Championship: Art of War 4 was the fourth mixed martial arts event by the mixed martial arts organization Art of War Undisputed Arena Fighting Championship. The event took place on Saturday, October 27, 2007 at the Grand Casino Tunica in Tunica, Mississippi. The card was distributed by American Television Distribution.

== History ==
The fight card included Mike Wessel and Matt Thomas in the main event. The show also featured a bout between Shane Carwin and Rex Richards. This was the first Art of War Undisputed Arena Fighting Championship outside of Texas and that did not air on AXS TV formally HDNet.

== Results ==
Main card
Weight class				Method	Round	Time	Notes
Heavyweight	Mike Wesel	def.	Matt Thomas	KO (Punches)	1	2:42
Heavyweight	Shane Carwin	def.	Rex Richards	Submission (Guillotine Choke)	1	1:24
Light Heavyweight	Ron Faircloth	def.	Chris Hawk	Submission (Rear-Naked Choke)	2	1:57
Welterweight	Andrew Chappelle	def.	Adriano Pereira	TKO (Punches)	3	3:54
Middleweight	Chris Gates	def.	Andy Uhrich	Submission (Triangle Choke)	1	3:34
Preliminary card
Welterweight	David Brown	def.	David Hulett	TKO (Punches)	3	1:18
Lightweight	Keith Bach	def.	Mark Wiggins	Submission (Rear-Naked Choke)	1	1:32
Light Heavyweight	Kyle Gibbons	def.	Mike Queen	Submission (Armbar)	1	0:58
