= Art of War 2 =

Art of War MMA event in 2007

Art of War Undisputed Arena Fighting Championship: Art of War 2
- Promotion: Art of War Undisputed Arena Fighting Championship
- Date: May 11, 2007
- Venue: American Airlines Center
- City: Austin, Texas
- Attendance: 2,854

Event chronology
Art of War 1	Art of War Undisputed Arena Fighting Championship: Art of War 2	Art of War 3

Art of War Undisputed Arena Fighting Championship: Art of War 2 was the second mixed martial arts event by the mixed martial arts organization Art of War Undisputed Arena Fighting Championship. The event took place on Saturday, May 11, 2007 at the Austin Convention Center in Austin, Texas. The card aired on HDTV.

== History ==
The fight card included Chris Guillen and Wes Sims in the main event. The show also featured a bout between David Loiseau and Freddie Espircueta.

== Results ==
Main card
Weight class				Method	Round	Time	Notes
Heavyweight	Chris Guillen	def.	Wes Sims	Decision (Unanimous)	4	5:00
Light Heavyweight	David Loiseau	def.	Freddie Espiricueta	Submission (Arm Triangle Choke)	2	3:10
Light Heavyweight	Alex Andrade	def.	Brandon McDowell	Submission (Ankle Lock)	1	1:02
Light Heavyweight	James Damien Stelly	def.	Klas Akesson	Submission (Rear-Naked Choke)	2	4:33
Lightweight	Chris Bowles	def.	Randy Hauer	Submission (Rear-Naked Choke)	2	2:14
Preliminary card
Heavyweight	Matt Thompson	def.	Justin Wren	TKO (Punches)	2	0:27
Bantamweight	Edwin Figueroa	def.	Whitney Brown	Submission (Rear-Naked Choke)	1	3:50
Welterweight	Aaron Flournoy	def.	Jarrot Lewis	Submission (Rear-Naked Choke)	1	3:50
Light Heavyweight	Justin Howard	def.	Tony Lozano	Submission (Kimura)	1	0:50
Lightweight	Daniel Pineda	def.	Warren Stewart	Submission (Rear-Naked Choke)	1	2:00
