= Art of War Undisputed Arena Fighting Championship =

Mixed martial arts promoter based in Dallas

- Industry: Mixed martial arts
- Headquarters: Dallas, Texas, U.S.

Art of War Undisputed Arena Fighting Championship (Art of War) is a defunct American-based Mixed martial arts (MMA) organization. The Art of War was headquartered in Dallas, Texas and was owned and operated by SUN Sports & Entertainment, Inc. It is not related to Chinese MMA promotion Art of War Fighting Championship.

== History ==
The Art of War held six events.

The first event, Art of War 1, was on March 9, 2007, at the American Airlines Center in front of over 6,000 attendees. The headliner was Pedro Rizzo vs Justin Eilers. The fight aired on HDNET.

Art of War 2 took place May 11, 2007 in Austin, Texas. The headliner was Chris Guillen vs Wes Sims.

The first pay-per-view Art of War 3 took place on September 1, 2007, at American Airlines Center in Dallas, Texas. The main event featured former UFC fighters Jeff Monson and Pedro Rizzo. The fight was distributed by American Television Distribution and aired on Dish Network.

=== Events ===
Event title	Date	Arena	Location
Art of War 1	March 9, 2007	American Airlines Center	Dallas, Texas
Art of War 2	May 11, 2007	Austin Convention Center	Austin, Texas
Art of War 3	September 1, 2007	American Airlines Center	Dallas, Texas
Art of War 4	October 27, 2007	Grand Casino Tunica	Tunica, Mississippi
AOW - Gis vs Pros	April 19, 2008	Grand Casino Tunica	Tunica, Mississippi
AOW - Mano A Mano	July 12, 2008	Mesquite Resistol Arena	Mesquite, Texas
