= American Television Distribution =

- Type: Private
- Industry: Television
- Founded: 2004
- Headquarters: Dallas, Texas, United States
- Key people: Tommy Habeeb, CEO; Marshall Hays, SVP
- Website: http://www.AmericanTVD.com/

American Television Distribution licenses television series and films for syndication in domestic and international outlets. The company is headed by Tommy Habeeb. The show Billionaires Car Club is hosted by Andrew Firestone and is currently airing internationally. September 1, 2007 will be the live Art of War 3 Pay-Per-View Event from American Airlines Center in Dallas, Texas

== Current Shows ==
- Billionaires Car Club
- Art of War 3
