= Art of War 3 =

Art of War MMA event in 2007

Art of War Undisputed Arena Fighting Championship: Art of War 3
- The poster for Art of War Undisputed Arena Fighting Championship: Art of War 3
- Promotion: Art of War Undisputed Arena Fighting Championship
- Date: September 1, 2007
- Venue: American Airlines Center
- City: Dallas, Texas
- Attendance: 8,000

Event chronology
Art of War 2	Art of War Undisputed Arena Fighting Championship: Art of War 3	Art of War 4

Art of War Undisputed Arena Fighting Championship: Art of War 3 was the third mixed martial arts event by the mixed martial arts organization Art of War Undisputed Arena Fighting Championship. The event took place on Saturday, September 1, 2007 at the American Airlines Center in Dallas, Texas. The card aired on AXS TV (formerly HDNet). The television broadcast was produced by Allan Colton, Dustin Hodge, and John Jones.

== History ==
The fight card included Pedro Rizzo and Jeff Monson in the main event. The show also featured a bout between Jorge Santiago and Jeremy Horn.

== Results ==
Main card
Weight class				Method	Round	Time	Notes
Heavyweight	Pedro Rizzo	def.	Jeff Monson	TKO (Punches)	3	2:40
Welterweight	Jorge Santiago	def.	Jeremy Horn	Submission (Triangle Choke)	1	3:02
Heavyweight	Ron Waterman	def.	Mario Rinaldi	TKO (Punches)	1	4:39
Light Heavyweight	Alex Andrade	def.	Fabiano Capoani	TKO (Strikes)	2	2:20
Welterweight	Carlo Prater	def.	Keith Wisnieski	Decision (Split)	3	5:00
Preliminary card
Heavyweight	Lanc Stefanac	def.	Franita Gathings	TKO (Strikes)	1	1:07
Lightweight	Jason Maxwell	def.	Thomas Schulte	Decision (Unanimous)	3	5:00
Light Heavyweight	Luis Cane	def.	James Damien Stelly	KO (Knee)	1	2:45
Lightweight	Cristiano Marcello	def.	Hector Munoz	Submission (Rear-Naked Choke)	1	4:58
Lightweight	Anthony Njokuani	def.	Keyon Mike Jackson	KO (Knee)	1	2:14
