= Art of War 1 =

Art of War MMA event in 2007

Art of War Undisputed Arena Fighting Championship: Art of War 1
- Promotion: Art of War Undisputed Arena Fighting Championship
- Date: February 10, 2007
- Venue: American Airlines Center
- City: Dallas, Texas
- Attendance: 6,000

Event chronology
N/A	Art of War Undisputed Arena Fighting Championship: Art of War 1

Art of War Undisputed Arena Fighting Championship: Art of War 1 was the inaugural mixed martial arts event by the mixed martial arts organization Art of War Undisputed Arena Fighting Championship. The event took place on Saturday, March 9, 2007 at the American Airlines Center in Dallas, Texas. The card aired on HDTV.

== History ==
The fight card included Pedro Rizzo and Justin Eilers in the main event. The show also featured a bout between Carlo Prater and Anthony Lapsley. Hosted by Tommy Habeeb

== Results ==
Main card
Weight class				Method	Round	Time	Notes
Heavyweight	Pedro Rizzo	def.	Justin Eilers	Decision (Unanimous)	3	5:00
Welterweight	Carlo Prator	def.	Anthony Lapsley	Decision (Unanimous)	3	5:00
Light Heavyweight	Alex Andrade	def.	Klas Akesson	TKO (Punches)	2	3:15
Lightweight	Yuki Inoue	def.	Jason Maxwell	Decision (Split)	3	5:00
Lightweight Heavyweight	James Damien Stelly	def.	Mike Shepard	Submission (Kimura)	1	3:43
Preliminary card
Middleweight	Eric Schambari	def.	Christian Smith	Submission (Arm Triangle Choke)	1	3:12
Lightweight	Anthony Njokuani	def.	Kennth Rosfot-Nees	KO (punch)	1	2:12
Heavyweight	Justin Wren	def.	Justin Howard	TKO (punches)	2	1:32
Lightweight	Sonny Nielsen	def.	Armando Valadez	KO (knee to the body)	1	1:16
Heavyweight	Tom East	def.	Brian Russell	TKO (punches)	1	1:51
