= Marshall Hays =

American entrepreneur (born 1973)

Marshall Hays is an American entrepreneur. Raised in a suburb of Houston, Texas, Hays was a 1995 graduate of Trinity University, where he earned Bachelor of Science degrees in both accounting and marketing. He then attended Southern Methodist University and earned his MBA in 1998. While at SMU, Hays was the teaching assistant for the Electronic Commerce Class in 1996 while also founding his first business that same year, Hays Internet Marketing, Inc.

Hays Internet Marketing is an interactive agency that provided internet marketing consulting and development for clients such as AT&T, Fujitsu, and Nextel. The company also owns and operates several popular web properties, the most famous ones include VirtualKiss.com, WhoDoYouLove.com, DatingFun.com, and VirtualStapler.com. Success of the dating advice related websites led to many radio interviews, 2 CNN appearances and Hays then becoming the co-host of a weekend radio show on 105.3FM in Dallas, Texas, in 2001.

In 2004, Hays Internet Marketing stopped taking on new clients so that Marshall could serve as the Vice President of a television production company. Then in 2009 Hays purchased 3 car washes in Dallas, Texas, renaming them Lucky Ducky Car Wash. Later in 2011 Hays purchased the lube shop next to one of the car washes. In 2012 Hays started up a gourmet food truck business, calling it Lucky Ducky Dogs – Fun with Meat. The popular food truck was a finalist for D Magazine's Best of Big D in 2013.

Hays moved to Virginia in 2017 and sold all the Texas-based businesses, so that he could start up Highlight Homes LLC, a vacation rental home business, buying and remodeling homes in Massanutten, Virginia and a beach house on the Chesapeake Bay. The business quickly became an Airbnb Superhost, and premier partner of Vrbo.
