= Agriculture commissioner =

State executive position in the U.S.

In the state governments of the United States, all 50 states have the executive position of agriculture commissioner, director of agriculture, or secretary of agriculture. This official is in charge of the state's agriculture department. The agriculture commissioners are organized at the national level by the National Association of State Departments of Agriculture.

The agriculture commissioner is elected in 12 states: Alabama, Florida, Georgia, Iowa, Kentucky, Louisiana, Mississippi, North Carolina, North Dakota, South Carolina, Texas, and West Virginia. The powers and duties of the office vary from state to state, but are often substantial: in about 40 states, agriculture departments regulate the animal industry, and in roughly half the states, agriculture departments regulate food safety and meat inspection. In some states, the agriculture commissioner has more power. For example, in Florida the agriculture commissioner is one of four members of the Florida Cabinet (along with the governor, chief financial officer, and attorney general), giving the commissioner some influence over state policy beyond agriculture. In North Dakota, the agriculture commissioner sits on a number of important boards, such as the North Dakota Industrial Commission (which oversees the state-owned North Dakota Mill and Elevator and Bank of North Dakota).

== Departments ==
State	Officeholder	Title	Term start	Party
Alabama Department of Agriculture and Industries	Rick Pate	Commissioner	January 14, 2019	Republican Party
Alaska Department of Natural Resources, Division of Agriculture	Bryan Scoresby	Director	February 10, 2023	Nonpartisan
Arizona Department of Agriculture	Paul Brierley	Director	June 26, 2023	Nonpartisan
Arkansas Department of Agriculture	Wes Ward	Secretary	2015	Nonpartisan
California Department of Food and Agriculture	Karen Ross	Secretary	January 12, 2011	Nonpartisan
Colorado Department of Agriculture	Kate Greenberg	Commissioner	December 21, 2018	Nonpartisan
Connecticut Department of Agriculture	Bryan Hurlburt	Commissioner	March 29, 2019	Nonpartisan
Delaware Department of Agriculture	Michael Scuse	Secretary	January 25, 2017	Nonpartisan
Florida Department of Agriculture and Consumer Services	Wilton Simpson	Commissioner	January 3, 2023	Republican Party
Georgia Department of Agriculture	Tyler Harper	Commissioner	January 12, 2023	Republican Party
Hawaii Department of Agriculture	Sharon Hurd	Commissioner	March 31, 2023	Nonpartisan
Idaho Department of Agriculture	Chanel Tewalt	Director	January 23, 2023	Nonpartisan
Illinois Department of Agriculture	Jerry Costello II	Director	February 28, 2020	Nonpartisan
Indiana State Board of Agriculture	Bruce Kettler	Director	January 8, 2018	Nonpartisan
Iowa Department of Agriculture and Land Stewardship	Mike Naig	Secretary	March 1, 2018	Republican Party
Kansas Department of Agriculture	Mike Beam	Secretary	January 14, 2019	Nonpartisan
Kentucky Department of Agriculture	Jonathan Shell	Commissioner	January 1, 2024	Republican Party
Louisiana Department of Agriculture and Forestry	Michael G. Strain	Commissioner	January 14, 2008	Republican Party
Maine Department of Agriculture, Conservation and Forestry	Amanda E. Beal	Commissioner	2019	Nonpartisan
Maryland Department of Agriculture	Kevin Atticks	Secretary	January 18, 2023	Nonpartisan
Massachusetts Department of Agricultural Resources	Ashley Randle	Commissioner	March 6, 2023	Nonpartisan
Michigan Department of Agriculture and Rural Development	Tim Boring	Director	March 27, 2023	Nonpartisan
Minnesota Department of Agriculture	Thomas E. Petersen	Commissioner	January 7, 2019	Nonpartisan
Mississippi Department of Agriculture and Commerce	Andy Gipson	Commissioner	April 2, 2018	Republican Party
Missouri Department of Agriculture	Chris Chinn	Director	January 29, 2017	Nonpartisan
Montana Department of Agriculture	Christy Clark	Director	January 31, 2022	Nonpartisan
Nebraska Department of Agriculture	Steve Wellman	Director	December 5, 2017	Nonpartisan
Nevada Department of Agriculture	Jennifer Ott	Director	March 4, 2019	Nonpartisan
New Hampshire Department of Agriculture	Shawn Jasper	Commissioner	December 9, 2017	Nonpartisan
New Jersey Department of Agriculture	Ed Wengryn	Secretary	March 22, 2024	Nonpartisan
New Mexico Department of Agriculture	Jeff M. Witte	Secretary	May 2011	Nonpartisan
New York State Department of Agriculture and Markets	Richard A. Ball	Commissioner	January 9, 2014	Nonpartisan
North Carolina Department of Agriculture and Consumer Services	Steve Troxler	Commissioner	February 8, 2005	Republican Party
North Dakota Department of Agriculture	Doug Goehring	Commissioner	2009	Republican Party
Ohio Department of Agriculture	Brian Baldridge	Director	January 31, 2023	Nonpartisan
Oklahoma Department of Agriculture, Food, and Forestry	Blayne Arthur	Secretary	December 2018	Nonpartisan
Oregon Department of Agriculture	Lisa Charpilloz Hanson	Director	December 1, 2023	Nonpartisan
Pennsylvania Department of Agriculture	Russell Redding	Secretary	January 20, 2015	Nonpartisan
Rhode Island Department of Agriculture	Kenneth Ayars	Commissioner	1998	Nonpartisan
South Carolina Department of Agriculture	Hugh Weathers	Commissioner	September 14, 2004	Republican Party
South Dakota Department of Agriculture	Hunter Roberts	Secretary	April 19, 2021	Nonpartisan
Tennessee Department of Agriculture	Dr. Charlie Hatcher	Commissioner	January 19, 2021	Nonpartisan
Texas Department of Agriculture	Sid Miller	Commissioner	2015	Republican Party
Utah Department of Agriculture and Food	Craig Buttars	Commissioner	January 5, 2021	Nonpartisan
Vermont Agency of Agriculture Food and Markets	Anson Tebbetts	Secretary	January 5, 2017	Nonpartisan
Virginia Department of Agriculture and Consumer Services	Joseph W. Guthrie	Commissioner	January 15, 2022	Nonpartisan
Washington State Department of Agriculture	Derek Sandison	Director	June 15, 2015	Nonpartisan
West Virginia Department of Agriculture	Kent Leonhardt	Commissioner	January 16, 2017	Republican Party
Wisconsin Department of Agriculture, Trade and Consumer Protection	Randy Romanski	Secretary	September 28, 2021	Nonpartisan
Wyoming Department of Agriculture	Doug Miyamoto	Director	March 15, 2015	Nonpartisan
