= Terry Peach =

American politician (1950–2022)

Oklahoma Secretary of Agriculture
- In office 2003–2011
- Governor: Brad Henry
- Preceded by: Dennis Howard
- Succeeded by: Jim Reese

Oklahoma Commissioner of Agriculture
- In office 2003–2011
- Governor: Brad Henry
- Preceded by: Dennis Howard
- Succeeded by: Jim Reese

State Executive Director for the Oklahoma Farm Service Agency
- In office 1993–2000
- President: Bill Clinton
- Succeeded by: Jim Reese

Personal details
- Born: March 18, 1950 Mutual, Oklahoma
- Died: January 20, 2022 (aged 71) Mutual, OK
- Occupation: Farmer, Rancher
- Website: Oklahoma Department of Agriculture

Terry Peach (March 18, 1950 – January 20, 2022) was an American farmer and politician from Oklahoma. Peach previously served as the Oklahoma Secretary of Agriculture under Governor of Oklahoma Brad Henry from 2003 to 2011. Peach served concurrently as the Commissioner of Agriculture, having served in that position when he was appointed by Governor Henry in 2003.

== Early life and career ==
Peach operated a family farm and ranch in Mutual, Oklahoma, since 1972. He also owns and operates a farm supply company and an oilfield supply business in Woodward, Oklahoma. He earned his bachelor degree in vocational agriculture from Oklahoma State University. Peach served as the Oklahoma executive director of the Farm Service Agency, an agency within the United States Department of Agriculture, for 1993 to 2000. As executive director, Peach delivered federal agriculture programs to Oklahoma farmers and ranchers through more than 60 county offices across the state.

== Secretary of Agriculture ==
Appointed by Governor of Oklahoma Brad Henry in 2003, Peach previously served as the Oklahoma Secretary of Agriculture and Commissioner of the Oklahoma Department of Agriculture. As the Secretary, Peach protected and educated consumers about Oklahoma's agricultural and livestock productions. He was succeeded in 2011 by Jim Reese, who was appointed by Republican Governor Mary Fallin.

== Personal life ==
Peach was a member of numerous agricultural and civic organizations, including the Oklahoma Farm Bureau and the Oklahoma Farmers Union.

Political offices
Preceded by Dennis Howard	Oklahoma Secretary of Agriculture; Under Governor Brad Henry; 2003 - 2011	Succeeded by Jim Reese
Preceded by Dennis Howard	Oklahoma Commissioner of Agriculture; Under Governor Brad Henry; 2003 - 2011	Succeeded by Jim Reese
