= Joey Greco =

American television personality

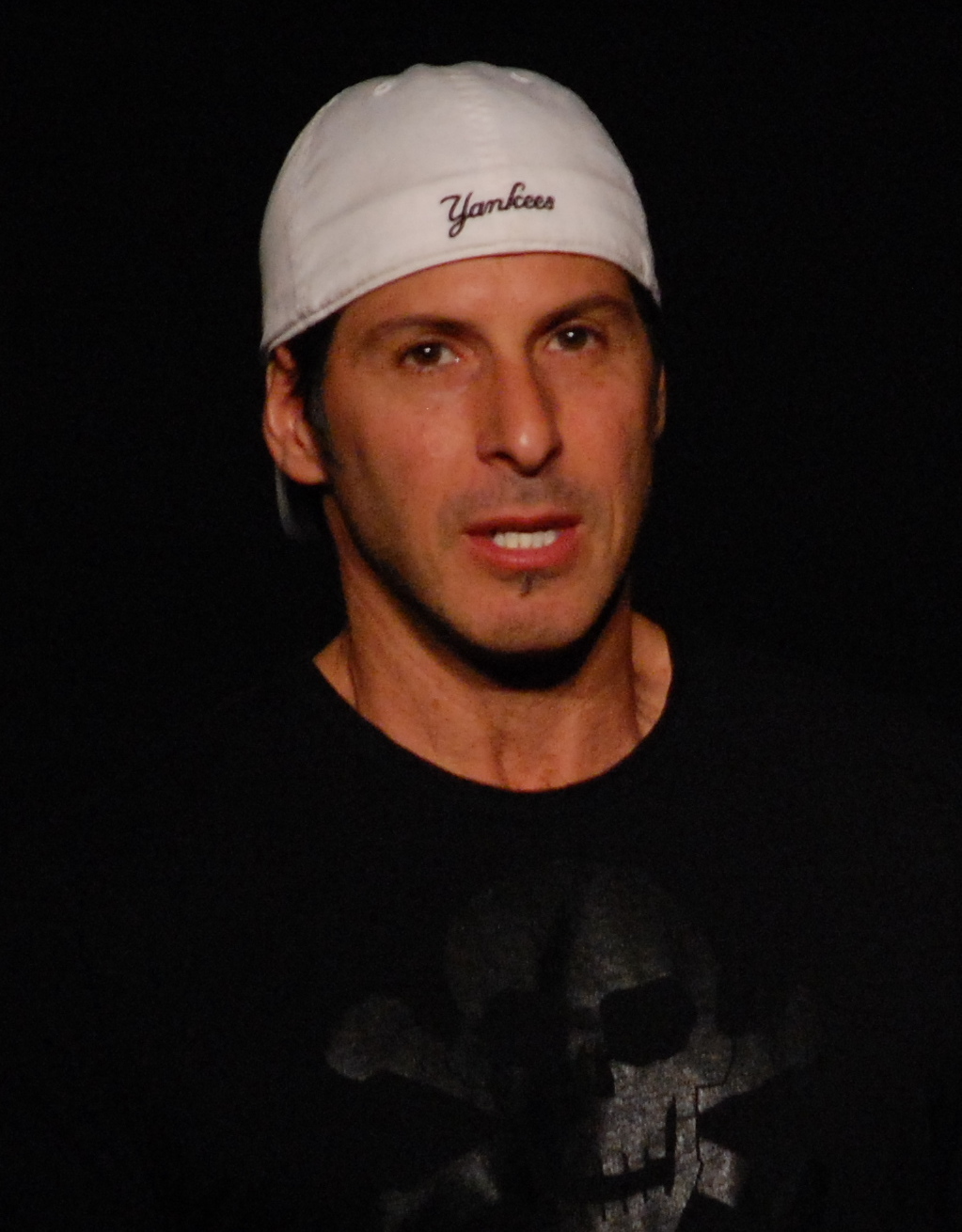
- Joey Greco at the Dallas Comedy House in 2010
- Born: Joel Stephen Greco; February 29, 1972 (age 54); Long Island, New York, United States
- Occupation: Television personality
- Years active: 1993–2013, 2015, 2017
- Known for: Cheaters

Joel Stephen "Joey" Greco (born Joseph Grecowski:(born February 29, 1972) is an American television personality, best known as the long-time host of the reality TV show Cheaters, hosting for ten seasons.

== Early life and education ==
Greco was born and raised on Long Island. He graduated from Evangel University, a private Pentecostal liberal arts college in Springfield, Missouri, with a BA in psychology, and received a Master's Degree in counseling at Louisiana Tech University. He began his working career as a counselor, later becoming a fitness trainer in Dallas, Texas, before switching careers yet again to become a real estate manager. In a 2011 interview on Decently Funny With Nuzzy and the Guy (a pop-culture podcast by broadcasters/producers David "Nuzzy" Nussbaum and Guy "The Guy" Opochinski), Greco revealed that he used to tend bar at a seafood restaurant.

== Entertainment industry career ==
As a fitness trainer, he landed a job on ESPN's hip-hop oriented fitness show, Fitness Pros. In December 2002, he replaced Tommy Habeeb as host of Cheaters. At the start of Season 13 (2012–2013), Greco was replaced by Clark Gable's grandson, Clark Gable III, but returned for the Season 15 finale in 2015. He has also appeared in television commercials.

In early 2003, Greco was allegedly stabbed by a cheating boyfriend when the Cheaters crew boarded the man's boat; however, on November 3, 2009, the news magazine program Inside Edition interviewed the female companion, who said it was all staged. Greco was confronted a week later by the program's investigative reporter Matt Meagher. Greco declined to answer any of Meagher's questions, stating he couldn't legally comment on the accusation. John Ellison of the Rowlett Police Department stated on the same program that "There were no arrests at all during that time period for that type of crime." In 2005, Greco, Cheaters director at the time Hunter Carson, and two security guards, were indicted for assault by a grand jury but acquitted in connection with the 'confrontations' on the program.

After the tenth season of the show, Greco was added to the credits as co-producer. In 2010, Greco starred in, wrote, and produced a pseudo-reality series called Ghostbreakers.

In June 2012, Greco acted in idents and special presentations for the UK TV channel Really, the UK broadcaster of Cheaters. Greco's image was used in a 2007 episode of The Simpsons titled "Dial 'N' for Nerder". Greco was mentioned by Seth MacFarlane at the 64th Primetime Emmy Awards in a brief monologue for Outstanding Reality-Competition Program as "The guy who was on Cheaters, and got stabbed on camera". Greco returned to host the fifteenth-season finale of Cheaters for the second case; however, Greco responded on his Twitter page that the case was one that was taped in 2012 and had not aired at the time. After his run on Cheaters, Greco appeared in the 2013 film Charlie: A Toy Story, portraying Mr. Amrak.

Greco made two public appearances in 2015 and 2017. In 2015, he appeared in a television series, Hot Package Sex and Violence. In February 2017, Greco hosted a Netflix parody of Cheaters titled "Netflix Cheaterz", as an ad campaign to deter spouses or lovers from watching episodes of Netflix shows before their other half.

== Later career ==
As of 2023, Greco is working as a realtor in Dallas.

== Filmography ==
- 1998 – Finding North – Party Guest
- 2003 – The Bottom Line – Tony
- 2005 – Devon's Ghost: The Legend Of The Bloody Boy – Garry Walker
- 2006 – Serum – Detective Williams
- 2007 – Mad Bad – Loomis
- 2009 – The Locker – Patrick McMahon
- 2009 – Nightcrawlers – Delacroix
- 2009 – Janky Promoters – Kevin MaLine
- 2009 – Black Angels – as himself
- 2010 – The House That Drips Blood on Alex – The Landlord
- 2013 – Charlie: A Toy Story – Mr. Amrak
- 2017 – Netflix Cheaterz – Himself

=== Television roles ===
- 2002–2012, 2015 – Cheaters – himself/host (seasons 3–12, Season 15 finale)
- 2006 – Talkshow with Spike Feresten – himself (November 11 episode)
- 2007 – George Lopez – "George Thinks Vic's Fiancée is Lion about Being a Cheetah' – as himself
- 2008 – Unhitched – as himself
- 2009 – House arrest With Andy Dick – as himself
- 2009 – The Jay Leno Show – as himself (September 14 series premiere)
- 2015 – Hot Package Sex and Violence
