= Oklahoma Commissioners of the Land Office =

- Great Seal of Oklahoma

Agency overview
- Formed: November 16, 1907
- Headquarters: 204 N. Robinson Ste 900; Oklahoma City, Oklahoma
- Employees: 38 classified 12 unclassified
- Agency executive: Dan Whitmarsh, Secretary
- Website: Commissioners of the Land Office

The Oklahoma Commissioners of the Land Office is an agency of the government of Oklahoma. The Land Office was created by the Oklahoma Constitution and is responsible for managing and controlling lands and funds granted to the state under the provisions of the Oklahoma Organic Act. These lands and fund are used to support common schools, colleges and universities. The Commissioners of the Land Office distributes over $125 million each year to K-12 schools and qualifying higher education institutions across the state.

The governing body of the Land Office is the Commissioners. The board is composed of five members: the Governor, Lieutenant Governor, the State Auditor, the Superintendent of Public Instruction, and the Commissioner of Agriculture. The Governor serves as the Chair and the Lt. Governor serves as Vice Chair.

The Governor is responsible for appointing, with the consent of the other Commissioners, the Secretary of the Commissioners of the Land Office. The current Secretary is Dan Whitmarsh, who was appointed by Governor Kevin Stitt in 2023.

The Land Office was created in 1907 during the term of Governor Charles N. Haskell.

== Mission ==
The mission of the Commissioners of the Land Office is: "managing assets to support education".

== Leadership ==
The Commissioners of the Land Office is under the supervision of the five-member board of Commissioners, with the Governor of Oklahoma serving as permanent Chairman and the Lieutenant Governor of Oklahoma serving as the permanent Vice Chairman.

The members of the Commissioners of the Land Office:

Office	Current Officer	Party
Governor of Oklahoma	Kevin Stitt	Republican
Lieutenant Governor	Matt Pinnell	Republican
State Auditor and Inspector	Cindy Byrd	Republican
State School Superintendent	Lindel Fields	Republican
Commissioner of Agriculture	Blayne Arthur	Republican

== Organization ==
- Commissioners of the Land Office
  - Secretary of the Land Office
    - Administration Division - responsible for oversight of the agency
    - Accounting Division - responsible for all accounting functions of the agency, including receipt of all funds, payment of claims, accounting for the fixed assets of the trusts and budgeting
    - Legal Division - responsible for providing legal services to the CLO
    - Minerals Management Division - responsible for the lease, sale and management of mineral rights under the control of the CLO
    - Real Estate Management Division - responsible for the lease, sale and management of school lands under the control of the CLO

== Staffing ==
The Commissioners of the Land Office, with an annual budget of over $8 million. In fiscal year 2021, the Land Office was authorized 60 full-time employees.

Activity	Number of Employees
Administration	7
Real Estate	17
Financial	11
Minerals	15
Legal	5
IT	5
Total	60
