= Little Britches =

Little Britches may refer to:

- Little Britches (book), an autobiographical work by Ralph Moody
- Little Britches (outlaw) (a.k.a. Jennie Stevens, born 1879), American Old West outlaw
- Little Britches on the Road, a television series about rural communities
- Little Britches Rodeo, a rodeo competition for youths age 5 to 18
- Little Britches Rodeo (TV series), a television series about Little Britches Rodeo competition
- Cattle Annie and Little Britches, a 1981 Western drama
- National Little Britches Rodeo Association, a youth based rodeo organization
