= Oklahoma Conservation Commission =

- Conservation Commission logo

Agency overview
- Formed: July 1, 1971
- Headquarters: 2800 N. Lincoln Blvd Ste 200 Oklahoma City, Oklahoma
- Employees: 62 (FY11)
- Annual budget: $27.8 million (FY11)
- Minister responsible: Jim Reese, Secretary of Agriculture
- Agency executive: Trey Lam, Executive Director
- Website: www.ok.gov/conservation/

The Oklahoma Conservation Commission is an agency of the government of Oklahoma under the Governor of Oklahoma. It is the duty of the Commission to conserve Oklahoma's land and water. The Commission is also responsible for upstream flood control protection, a state-funded conservation cost-share program, reclamation of abandoned mine land and non point source water quality monitoring, planning, and management, in addition to a variety of educational and informational activities.

The Commissison is composed of five members, appointed by the Governor with the consent of the Oklahoma Senate. The Commission, in turn, appoints an Executive Director to manage the day-to-day operations of the Commission.

The Commission was created in 1971 during the term of Governor David Hall.

== Mission ==
To conserve, protect and restore Oklahoma's natural resources, working in collaboration with the conservation districts and other partners, on behalf of the citizens of Oklahoma.

== Leadership ==
The Commission is administered by the Secretary of Agriculture, the Chair of Commission, and the Executive Director of the Commission. Under Governor Mary Fallin, Jim Reese is serving as the Secretary and Trey Lam is serving as the Executive Director.

=== Commission Membership ===
The Commission is composed of five members, appointed by the Governor with the consent of the Oklahoma Senate, to serve a five-year term. Each member of the Commission is appointed from one of the five districts of the State. Each member appointed must be, at the time of his appointment, a Conservation District Director. Each member of the Oklahoma Conservation Commission shall be a Conservation District Director during the entire term as a Commission member. At least than three members of said Commission must engage in farming or ranching as their primary profession.

As of 2013, the members of the Commission are:

- Area I - Karl Jett
- Area II - Phil Campbell
- Area III - Scotty Herriman
- Area IV - Deanna LeGrand
- Area V - Bill Clark

== Jurisdiction ==
The Oklahoma Conservation Commission provides assistance to Oklahoma's 85 conservation districts and to the public in order to foster a sense of care, wise use and best management of Oklahoma's renewable natural resources. The conservation districts in Oklahoma are grouped into five areas in the state. Each area is represented by a Conservation Commission board member. Administration of the agency is carried out by an executive director.

The Oklahoma Conservation Commission and conservation districts accomplish conservation of renewable natural resources through soil and water conservation, landuse planning, small watershed upstream flood control, abandoned mine land reclamation, water quality monitoring, environmental education and wetlands conservation.

== Organization ==
- Conservation Commission
  - Executive Director
    - Assistant Director
      - Administration - The Administration division represents the Commission board in providing oversight and support for all Conservation Commission operations, programs and divisions, as well as management of public communication activities and production of public information materials. This division makes policy decisions for the agency.
        - Financial Management/Human Resources - The Financial Management and Human Resources division provides support to all operations and programs of the Oklahoma Conservation Commission and assistance to conservation districts regarding personnel and financial management, procurement, risk management and employee benefits coordination.
        - Information Technology - The Information Technology division's responsibilities include the Oklahoma Conservation Commission's geographic information systems (GIS) operations and database management, and computer network administration for the agency, as well as computer network support to the agency and to conservation districts. Access to digital orthophotography is also available through this division.
      - Abandoned Mine Land Reclamation Division - This Abandoned Mine Land Reclamation division carries out the federally funded Abandoned Mine Land (AML) Reclamation Program in the state to protect the public from hazards left as a result of past coal mining practices.
      - Conservation Programs Division - The Conservation Programs division provides management and technical assistance to Oklahoma's 88 conservation districts in three major program areas: Watershed Flood Control Programs, Locally Led Cost-Share Program and Conservation Education
      - District Services Division - The District Services division's primary objective is to serve as a liaison to conservation district boards and employees in an effort to enhance the capabilities of districts to deliver a variety of services and programs.
      - Water Quality Division - The Oklahoma Conservation Commission is the state's nonpoint source technical lead agency in carrying out Section 319 Nonpoint Source Management Programs of the federal Clean Water Act Amendments of 1987. The Water Quality division is responsible for the prioritization and management of nonpoint source pollution of the state's waters. The division also includes the Conservation Commission's Wetlands Program.

== Staffing ==
The Conservation Commission, with an annual budget of just under $30 million, is one of the smaller employers of the State. For fiscal year 2010, the Commission was authorized 71 full-time employees.

Division	Number of Employees
Administration	12
Watershed Operations and Maintenance	6
Field Services	2
Abandoned Mine Land Reclamation	9
Water Quality	42
Total	71

== Conservation Districts ==
The State is divided into 85 Conservation Districts organized by local residents. Each conservation district office offers a variety of natural resource information including soil surveys. Conservation districts provide services to large segments of the public, including farmers, ranchers, community planners, public health officials, developers, educators, students, and rural and urban citizens.

Each District is governed by a Conservation District Board composed of three members are elected by the people of the district and two members are appointed by the Commission. The elected members serve staggered three-year terms with one being elected each year. The appointed members serve staggered two-year terms with one being appointed each year.

== See also ==
- Oklahoma Department of Agriculture, Food, and Forestry
