= Dennis Howard =

American politician

Oklahoma Secretary of Agriculture
- In office 1995–2003
- Governor: Frank Keating
- Preceded by: Gary Sherrer
- Succeeded by: Terry Peach

Oklahoma Commissioner of Agriculture
- In office 1995–2003
- Governor: Frank Keating
- Preceded by: Gary Sherrer
- Succeeded by: Terry Peach

Personal details
- Born: September 10, 1954 (age 71) Waurika, Oklahoma, US
- Occupation: Farmer, lobbyist
- Website: Oklahoma Department of Agriculture

Dennis Howard (born September 10, 1954) is an American politician from Oklahoma that served as the Oklahoma Secretary of Agriculture under former Governor of Oklahoma Frank Keating. Concurrent with his service as Secretary, Howard served as the Oklahoma Commissioner of Agriculture. Howard served as both Agriculture Secretary and Agriculture Commissioner for the entire term of Governor Keating, from 1995 to 2003.

== Biography ==
Originally from Waurika, Oklahoma, Howard earned a bachelor's degree in public administration and a master's degree in rural adult education from Oklahoma State University. Prior to his appointment as Agriculture Secretary by Keating, Howard served as Director of Public Affairs for Republican Congressman Frank Lucas since 1994. Before working for Congressman Lucas, he served as Director of Governmental Relations for the Oklahoma Farm Bureau from 1988 to 1994. He currently is employed in the Langston University Agriculture Department.

Political offices
Preceded by Gary Sherrer	Oklahoma Secretary of Agriculture; Under Governor Frank Keating; 1995–2003	Succeeded by Terry Peach
Preceded by Gary Sherrer	Oklahoma Commissioner of Agriculture; Under Governor Frank Keating; 1995–2003	Succeeded by Terry Peach
