= Champs Boxing =

2002–2003 boxing matches in Texas, US

- Industry: Boxing
- Headquarters: Fort Worth, Texas, U.S.

Champs Boxing was a series of boxing matches that took place in Fort Worth, Texas, during 2002 and 2003. The boxing events were created to supplement Telefutura's programming when the network moved to a 24-hour schedule. The boxing matches took place on Saturday night, and aired later in the week to round out TeleFutura's growing need for programming content. TeleFutura had large Friday Night boxing programming, but the demand was to add several smaller events throughout the week.

Tommy Habeeb, Leslie Norris, and Dustin Hodge were the producers and produced the events through Tommy Habeeb Enterprises, before later moving to producing MMA events for the Art of War Undisputed Arena Fighting Championship.

Kendrick Releford and America Santos were two of the more well known boxers on the events. The fights were sanctioned by the Texas Combative Sports Program.

== History ==
Champs Boxing held six events.

The first event, Gonzalez vs Guereca, was on October 11, 2002, at the Ramada Plaza in Fort Worth, Texas. The headliner was Jesse Gonzales vs Bernardo Guereca.

The second event, Gonzalez vs Herrera took place November 7, 2002, at the Cowtown Coliseum in Fort Worth, Texas. The headliner was Jesse Gonzales vs Rene Francisco Herrera. The event also featured Kendrick Releford vs Andrew Greeley.

The third event, Gonzalez vs Suarez, took place March 8, 2003, at the Pequeno Mexico Event Building in Fort Worth, Texas. The headliner was Jesse Gonzales vs Eloy Suarez. This event was broadcast on TeleFutura.

The fourth event, Gonzalez vs Sandoval, took place May 31, 2003, at the Hooters in Fort Worth, Texas. The headliner was Jesse Gonzales vs Norberto Sandoval. This event was broadcast on TeleFutura.

The fifth event, Vasquez vs Barron, took place August 8, 2003, at the Worthington Hotel in Fort Worth, Texas. The headliner was Gabriel Vasquez vs Rogelio Barron. This event was broadcast on TeleFutura.

The final event, Santos vs Trigg took place September 9, 2003, at the Penthouse Club in Dallas, Texas. The headliner was Americo Santos vs John Trigg. This event was broadcast on TeleFutura.

=== Events ===
| Event title | Date | Arena | Location |
|---|---|---|---|
| Gonzalez vs Guereca | October 11, 2002 | Ramada Plaze | Fort Worth, Texas |
| Gonzalez vs Herrera | November 7, 2002 | Cowtown Coliseum | Fort Worth, Texas |
| Gonzalez vs Suarez | March 8, 2003 | Pequeno Mexico Event Building | Fort Worth, Texas |
| Gonzalez vs Sandoval | May 31, 2003 | Hooters | Fort Worth, Texas |
| Vasquez vs Barron | August 8, 2003 | Worthington Hotel | Fort Worth, Texas |
| Santos vs Trigg | September 9, 2003 | Penthouse Club | Dallas, Texas |
