= List of Talkshow with Spike Feresten episodes =

Episodes of American late-night talk show series

The following is a list of episodes from Talkshow with Spike Feresten, an American late-night talk show hosted by Spike Feresten on Fox.

== Episodes ==
=== Season 1 (2006–07) ===
No.	Guest(s)	Original release date	Prod. code
1	Andy Richter	September 16, 2006	5031-06-101
2	Mary Lynn Rajskub	September 23, 2006	5031-06-102
3	Michael McDonald	September 30, 2006	5031-06-104
4	Thomas Lennon	October 7, 2006	5031-06-105
5	Tom Green	October 14, 2006	5031-06-103
6	Jerry Seinfeld	October 21, 2006	5031-06-108
7	Jason Alexander	November 4, 2006	5031-06-109
8	Joey Greco	November 11, 2006	5031-06-106
9	Fred Willard	November 18, 2006	5031-06-113
10	Jeff Garlin	November 25, 2006	5031-06-111
11	Cheryl Hines	December 9, 2006	5031-06-114
12	Julia Louis-Dreyfus	December 16, 2006	5031-06-121
13	Carl Reiner	January 6, 2007	5031-06-120
14	Tim Meadows	January 20, 2007	5031-06-116
15	Tom Arnold	February 3, 2007	5031-06-117
16	John C. McGinley	February 10, 2007	5031-06-119
17	Melinda Clarke	February 17, 2007	5031-06-115
18	Bobby Lee	February 24, 2007	5031-06-122
19	Seth MacFarlane	March 24, 2007	5031-06-118
20	Alex Borstein	April 7, 2007	5031-06-112
21	Michael Rapaport	April 28, 2007	5031-06-110
22	Dave Foley	May 19, 2007	5031-06-107

=== Season 2 (2007–08) ===
No.	Guest(s)	Original release date	Prod. code
23	Ryan Seacrest	September 15, 2007	5031-07-201
24	Brian Baumgartner	September 22, 2007	5031-07-202
25	Eddie Kaye Thomas	September 29, 2007	5031-07-203
26	Louis C.K.	October 6, 2007	5031-07-205
27	Patrick Warburton, Jerry Seinfeld (as host)	November 3, 2007	5031-07-211
28	Carl Reiner	November 10, 2007	5031-07-208
29	Andy Kindler	November 17, 2007	5031-07-209
30	Nick Bakay	November 24, 2007	5031-07-210
31	Thomas Dekker and Mark L. Walberg	January 12, 2008	5031-08-213
32	Jordin Sparks	January 19, 2008	5031-08-213
33	Bryan Cranston	January 26, 2008	5031-08-218
34	Jimmy Smith & Doug Anderson	February 2, 2008	5031-08-217
35	John Langley	February 9, 2008	5031-08-220
36	Tim Heidecker and Eric Wareheim	February 16, 2008	5031-08-221
37	David Koechner	February 23, 2008	5031-07-212
38	Tom Green	March 8, 2008	5031-07-204
39	George Wallace	March 15, 2008	5031-07-214
40	Nick Swardson	March 29, 2008	5031-07-207
41	Adam Carolla	April 5, 2008	5031-08-222
42	James Kyson Lee	April 19, 2008	5031-07-206
43	Luenell	April 26, 2008	5031-08-219
44	Maz Jobrani	May 17, 2008	5031-08-215

=== Season 3 (2008–09) ===
No.	Guest(s)	Original release date	Prod. code
45	Kara DioGuardi	September 13, 2008	5031-08-301
46	Rex Lee	September 20, 2008	TBA
47	Kevin Farley	September 28, 2008	TBA
48	Bo Burnham	October 4, 2008	TBA
49	Glenn Howerton	October 11, 2008	TBA
50	Craig Robinson	November 1, 2008	TBA
51	Vanilla Ice	November 8, 2008	TBA
52	David Archuleta	November 15, 2008	TBA
53	Olivia Munn, Hanson	November 22, 2008	TBA
54	J.B. Smoove	December 13, 2008	TBA
55	Lisa Kudrow, Todd Barry, The Submarines	January 17, 2009	TBA
56	Mary Lynn Rajskub, Trace Adkins	January 24, 2009	TBA
57	Drew Pinsky, Ben Lyons, G. Love	January 31, 2009	TBA
58	Dana Carvey, Perez Hilton, Olivia Munn, Penn Fraser Jillette	February 7, 2009	TBA
59	Seth MacFarlane, Andy Richter, Jack Osbourne	February 14, 2009	TBA
60	Jennifer Morrison, Tom Papa, Shirley Manson	February 21, 2009	TBA
61	Cheech and Chong	March 7, 2009	TBA
62	Carl Reiner, Bo Burnham	March 14, 2009	TBA
63	Crista Flanagan	March 21, 2009	TBA
64	Niecy Nash	March 28, 2009	TBA
65	Tony Rock	April 25, 2009	TBA
66	Tim Heidecker and Eric Wareheim	May 16, 2009	TBA
