= Dustin Hodge =

American television writer and producer

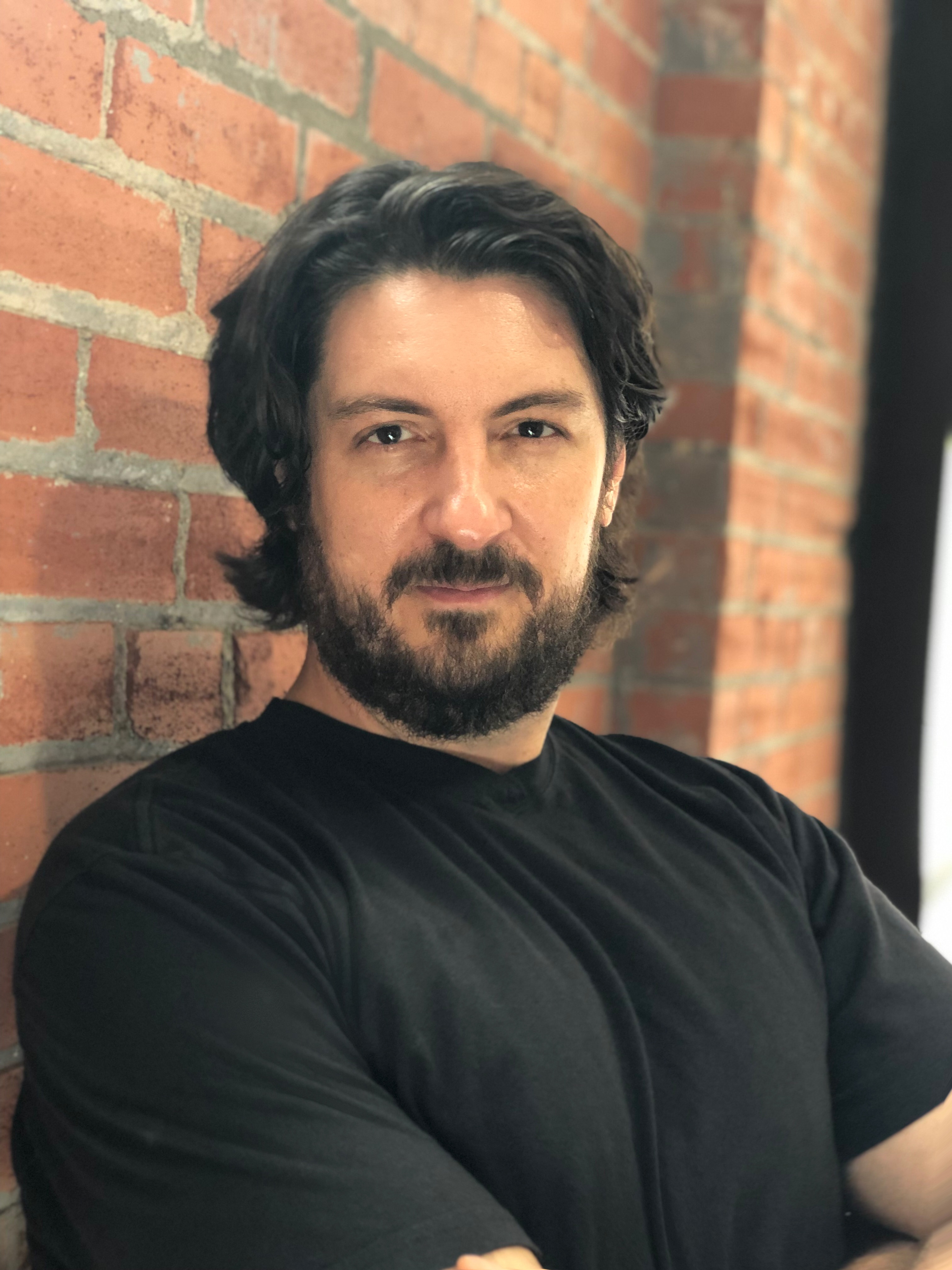
- Hodge in January 2019
- Born: Stephenville, Texas, U.S.
- Education: Arizona State University; Goucher College
- Occupations: Television producer; screenwriter
- Years active: 2003–present
- Spouse: Donna Hodge (m. 2013)
- Website: dustinhodge.com

Dustin Hodge is an American television writer and producer. He is the founder of Hodge Productions, a Colorado media company. He is known for working on a variety of nonfiction content. His most notable works are as the showrunner for Little Britches Rodeo and a producer for The Tight Rope podcast. His work primarily focuses on under-served and under-represented communities and issues: the convergence of cultural and ethnic borders on indigenous peoples, the sustainability and resilience of impoverished areas, and the struggles of first-generation students.

== Personal life ==
Hodge was born in Stephenville, Texas and graduated high school from Dublin, Texas. Hodge graduated summa cum laude from Arizona State University in Communications and has an MFA in Creative Nonfiction from Goucher College. Hodge is married to Donna Hodge, Ph.D.

== Career ==
Hodge began his film career working on commercials, music videos, and short videos in Dallas, Texas. He later worked as a production assistant on series like Prison Break and as a camera operator on shows like Cheaters and an Eye for an Eye and feature films like Bollywood Beats. He was the cinematographer for the feature film Diwali. Later he worked as a producer on televised sports programming like Champs Boxing, Wrecking Ball Wrestling, and Art of War 3. He was a reoccurring morning guest and wrote content for KWTX-FM. Hodge has also worked as a photojournalist and documentarian across most of Western Europe.

He also performed in live action as an improvisor within the comedy groups ComedySportz.

Later he worked for the CBS-affiliate KKTV, in Colorado Springs, CO as a news producer and journalist. He was part of the production team that covered the Waldo Canyon fire in Colorado for 130 continuous hours.

Hodge was the show-runner for the national television series Little Britches Rodeo and has written, produced, and directed 262 episodes. In addition, he was the show-runner for the series Little Britches on the Road, a spin-off series that ran for six seasons. Both series air in more than 52 million homes on RFD-TV, are syndicated in another 42 million homes on The Cowboy Channel, and syndicated in Canada on RFD-TV.

From July 2022 to April 2024, Hodge was the Producer of Lost Highways, a documentary podcast from History Colorado. Hodge has produced dozens of short documentaries covering programming by El Pueblo History Museum, History Colorado, and the Smithsonian Institution. He was also a consulting producer for the feature documentary The Arkansas River: From Leadville to Lamar. Hodge produced the feature documentary "Tha Bridge" (2010) that explored the positive influence of hip-hop on society. He directed and produced "Healthcare in Rural America" (2017) that documented the impact of health care on small rural markets, "Oral Histories of Southern Colorado" (2018) that traced the long-lasting effects of the Treaty of Guadalupe Hidalgo on generations of southern Coloradans, and "Alternative Energy: Clean Initiatives" (2017) that examined the sustainability of Solar power and Wind power in rural areas. Hodge's work interrogates issues of class, education, health care, and myriad topics facing America's rural communities.

Hodge has produced over 89 episodes of The Tight Rope podcast, which covers issues of race, social affairs, and culture. The series is hosted by Cornel West and Tricia Rose. A few notable guests have included: Michael Moore, Mayim Bialik, Jane Fonda, Nikole Hannah-Jones, Roxane Gay, Patricia Arquette, Rakim, Common (rapper) and Killer Mike.

Hodge has taught media at Goucher College and regularly speaks, presents, and writes about topics in media, pop culture, rural issues, and literacy. In addition, Hodge is a strong advocate for increased funding for the film industry.

== Filmography ==
=== Film and television ===
| Year | Title | Type | Note | Credited as | | |
| Year | Title | Type | Note | Director | Producer | Writer |
|---|---|---|---|---|---|---|
| 2013–Present | Little Britches Rodeo | TV series | 262 episodes | Yes | Yes | Yes |
| 2013–2017 | Little Britches on the Road | TV series | 17 episodes | Yes | Yes | Yes |
| 2008 | Wrecking Ball Wrestling 3 | TV – Sports | Wrestling | No | Yes | No |
| 2008 | Wrecking Ball Wrestling 2 | TV – Sports | Wrestling | No | Yes | No |
| 2008 | Wrecking Ball Wrestling 1 | TV – Sports | Wrestling | No | Yes | No |
| 2007 | Art of War 3 | TV – Sports | Mixed Martial Arts | No | Yes | No |
| 2003 | Champs Boxing | TV series | 4 episodes | No | Yes | No |

=== Documentaries ===
| Year | Title | Type | Note | Credited as | | |
| Year | Title | Type | Note | Director | Producer | Writer |
|---|---|---|---|---|---|---|
| 2010 | Tha Bridge | Documentary | | No | Yes | No |
| 2018 | The Arkansas River: From Leadville to Lamar | Documentary | | No | Yes | No |

=== Podcasts ===
| Year | Title | Type | Note | Credited as | | |
| Year | Title | Type | Note | Director | Producer | Writer |
|---|---|---|---|---|---|---|
| 2020–Present | The Tight Rope | Podcast | 89 episodes | No | Yes | No |

=== Documentary (Short Subject) ===
| Year | Title | Type | Note | Credited as | | |
| Year | Title | Type | Note | Director | Producer | Writer |
|---|---|---|---|---|---|---|
| 2018 | Oral Histories of Southern Colorado | Short | Documentary | Yes | Yes | Yes |
| 2017 | Alternative Energy: Clean Initiatives | Short | Documentary | Yes | Yes | Yes |
| 2017 | Healthcare in Rural America | Short | Documentary | Yes | Yes | Yes |
| 2016 | Hands-on History for Schools | Short | Documentary | Yes | Yes | Yes |
| 2015 | Shorty Koger: Western History | Short | Documentary | Yes | Yes | Yes |
| 2015 | Literary Landmarks: The Mediterranean | Short | Travel | Yes | Yes | Yes |
| 2014 | Literary Landmarks: Twain's Tramps Abroad | Short | Travel | Yes | Yes | Yes |
| 2013 | Literary Landmarks: The British Isles | Short | Travel | Yes | Yes | Yes |
| 2012 | Literary Landmarks: Language, Literature, and the Art of Study Abroad | Short | Travel | Yes | Yes | Yes |
| 2011 | From Pueblo to Pompeii | Short | Travel | Yes | Yes | Yes |
