= Cheaters (American TV series) =

American reality series (2000–2024)

- Genre: Reality
- Created by: Bobby Goldstein
- Written by: Bobby Goldstein
- Directed by: John McCalmont (2000–02); Kenneth M. Smith Jr. (2002–10)
- Presented by: Tommy Habeeb; Joey Greco; Clark James Gable; Peter Gunz
- Theme music composer: Bobby Goldstein
- Opening theme: "Broken Hearted" by: Bill Mason; Bobby Goldstein
- Composers: Bill Mason; Bobby Goldstein
- Country of origin: United States
- Original language: English
- No. of seasons: 21

Production
- Executive producer: Bobby Goldstein
- Producers: Bobby Goldstein; Vincent Devany
- Production locations: Various, but mostly in the Dallas/Fort Worth metroplex
- Editors: Jeremy Hechler; Israel Cavazos; Tim Wilkins; Matt Phillips; Andrew Phillips
- Running time: 60 mins. (weekly episodes); 30 mins. (strip version)
- Production companies: Bobby Goldstein Productions; MG-Perin Inc.

Original release
- Network: Syndication
- Release: October 2, 2000 – May 17, 2021

Cheaters is an American weekly syndicated reality television series featuring couples with one partner who is committing adultery, or cheating, on the other partner. Investigations are headed by the "Cheaters Detective Agency". The series premiered on October 2, 2000, and ended on May 17, 2021. It has been hosted by Tommy Habeeb, Joey Greco, Clark James Gable and Peter Gunz.

== Format ==
Actor Joey Greco was the show's longest-running host, hosting from late 2002 to mid-2012 and returning briefly in 2015. At the onset of the show's 13th season, he was replaced by Clark James Gable, the grandson of legendary actor Clark Gable. Gable would host the series until his unexpected death in 2019 due to a drug overdose. In February 2020, it was announced via social media that Love & Hip Hop star Peter Gunz would become the new host beginning in October 2020. Filming of season 21 took place in Dallas during the summer of 2020, despite the ongoing COVID-19 pandemic in the United States.

The show's complainants can be either married or long-term significant others, and have included both opposite-sex and same-sex couples.

Each episode begins with a brief interview of the complainant, detailing how the complainant met their partner and what has led them to believe that the partner is cheating, citing suspicious activities or behavior. Next, the narrator (originally Robert Magruder from 2000-2015, then Ken Eaken since 2015) describes the progress of the investigation of the partner (referred to as "the suspect"). Private investigators follow the suspect over the course of several days or weeks at their home, workplace, and/or in public with their alleged paramour (dubbed "the companion"). If the complainant and suspect live together, hidden cameras are occasionally installed in their home. A recorded telephone conversation between the complainant and suspect, in which the suspect lies about his or her whereabouts, is also played.

When the investigation turns up enough evidence of the suspect's infidelity, the show enters its second segment, "the confrontation." The host meets with the complainant to reveal the findings of the investigation and shows them the evidence collected (originally on a video camera, then on an iPad). The host sometimes warns the complainant that the footage is disturbing or upsetting but the complainant nonetheless requests to see it. Graphic footage from the investigators—for example, the suspect and their companion engaged in a sexual act—is shown uncensored to the complainant but digitally blurred to the show's viewers; however, uncensored versions of the encounters have been released on DVD.

The briefing takes place when the suspect and their companion are concurrently being observed together nearby; the intent is to allow the complainant to catch the suspect in the act of infidelity. After contacting the detective on his cell phone to find out their whereabouts, the host and the complainant, along with a full crew of production personnel all carrying 35 mm cameras, and security personnel travel in a van and seek out and confront the alleged cheater. The confrontation often takes place in public places, such as bars, restaurants and parks, with the complainant and host both demanding an explanation from the suspect for their behavior. Confrontations are often violent in nature, forcing security guards to restrain the complainant, suspect and/or companion. Confrontations also have the potential to end badly, as in one episode where host Joey Greco was apparently stabbed during a confrontation on a yacht and transported to a hospital. However, it has been disputed whether or not the stabbing was real or staged. Suspects also have been known to push the security guards, which causes the security guards to push back and let them know that they will retaliate. In very rare cases, animals unwittingly featured will have their heads blurred out for humorous effect.

The final segment, "the conclusion," presents parting thoughts from the complainant, the suspect and their companion as they depart the scene of the confrontation. Next, updates from previous cases, including interviews from suspects and their companions, are presented. Lastly, the narrator describes what became of the complainant, the suspect and the companion (and in rare cases, others that may also be involved) after the show.

== History ==
The show was created by Bobby Goldstein, an attorney in Dallas, Texas. It made its debut in 2000. The original host of the show was actor Tommy Habeeb aka "Tommy Grand" (2000–2002). 2004 brought syndication reruns of previous seasons, edited into a half-hour Monday-through-Friday strip format with new intros by Joey Greco as host. When Cheaters began airing in high-definition, the show's title card, used for eleven seasons, was altered to 3D, and more high-definition graphics were incorporated into the show.

== Syndication ==
Cheaters aired two episodes on The CW Plus on Saturday nights: a one-hour-long episode followed by a 30-minute episode from 2006-2017 and again from 2018-2019. A 10-minute version of the show produced by Scotty Gelt Productions called Cheaters: Amazing Confrontations is available through on-demand services.

In 2006, G4 began showing the strip version with faster-paced editing and music due to complaints that the show seemed boring and contrived, as well as a different narrator, for weekly airings on its Midnight Spank block. On December 9, 2009, G4 moved this show to the short-lived "Junk Food TV" block. G4 stopped airing the show in December 2012.

In January 2017, the syndicated half-hour strip format version of Cheaters returned to cable television, this time on VH1 during late Friday nights/early Saturday & Sunday morning slots. Cheaters also re-aired on MTV2.

In October 2022, Pluto TV launched a Cheaters channel, airing episodes of the 30-minute strip format.

Until December 2022, Cheaters aired on Ion Mystery and TrueReal (prior to its merger with Defy TV).

== Controversy and incidents ==
In 2002, the Houston Press tracked down several people who said they were paid $400 per show by one of the detectives of the agency to act on the show, and were paid $50 per referral of other actors. One performer said, "What [the show's private detective] told me was that some of the episodes are real, but... they would do these ringer episodes to supplement the show." The show's private investigator denies that he staged anyone's scenario and further added that the number of inquiries the agency receives made this unnecessary. The producers of Cheaters currently reiterate the reality of each episode in a legalistic message at its end, though a Federal Communications Commission representative confirmed to the Houston Press that "there's no law or regulation against presenting acted-out scenarios as reality on television."

On December 16, 2005, four employees of the show, the host Joey Greco, director Hunter Carson and two security guards, were indicted on charges of restraining a woman. On November 9, 2006, the four were acquitted. In another episode, Greco was detained at the scene of a bachelor party while helping a man confront his cheating fiancée. After Greco explained the situation about the couple to police, he was given a short talk about disturbing the peace and released with a written warning.

On November 3, 2009, Inside Edition reiterated the claim that the show was staged, citing several more actors who said they were paid to appear. One of them appeared in the Greco stabbing episode and claimed it was staged. Despite the depiction of a male being placed under arrest for stabbing Greco, Inside Edition found that no actual arrest matching that description was made by the Rowlett, Texas police department, where the episode took place. The ambulance shown, along with the EMS personnel appeared to be from "Greater Dallas EMS". Greater Dallas EMS was a private transfer ambulance in the Dallas area but would have never been dispatched for a 911 emergency. They are now out of business after being raided by the FBI in an investigation known as Operation Easy Rider. Physician–patient privilege would prevent the hospital that treated Greco from releasing records to Inside Edition. Nothing prevents the producers of Cheaters from voluntarily displaying the records, yet they have not done so. Despite the lack of records, Goldstein denied in an interview that the episode was staged. In a follow-up, aired on Inside Edition the following week (November 9, 2009), Greco was interviewed by investigative reporter Matt Meagher about the previous week's accusations. Greco declined to respond, claiming that he could not legally do so.

On August 8, 2010, an Equal Employment Opportunity Commission press release reported that Bobby Goldstein Productions, Inc., and Cheaters II, Ltd. (Civil Action No. 3:08-CV-1912-P) paid $50,000 to settle a sexual harassment lawsuit. The suit was brought on the behalf of two female office assistants who were the target of frequent sexual jokes and comments, unwanted physical advances, and propositions for sex. The alleged perpetrators included members of upper management. Says attorney Robert A. Canino, a regional attorney from the EEOC Dallas District Office, "just because the creator of Cheaters promotes a TV show business which thrives on featuring sexual transgressions, it is no justification for engaging in sexual improprieties which violate the employment rights of his female employees behind the scenes."

== Merchandise ==
Visual Entertainment of Canada has released several best-of collections of Cheaters on DVD in Region 1. In addition the Cheaters Spy Shop was launched in September 2011 to sell items used on the show and has been promoted in episodes beginning in the Season 12. Cheaters DVD are distributed in the United States by Scotty Gelt Films and are released uncensored, with language and sexual content (including occasional views of acts such as fellatio and penetration) shown unfiltered.

== References in pop culture ==
The show has been parodied and referenced in several films and television shows, such as Janky Promoters (2009), George Lopez, Disturbia (2007), Sex Drive (2008), Just Go With It (2011), Mind of Mencia, TV: The Movie (2007), Talkshow with Spike Feresten, Workaholics, Unhitched, The Simpsons, and The Jay Leno Show.

The 2009 music video for the Jacki-O track I Got Yo Boyfriend spoofs the Cheaters format, with rapper Jacki-O posing as the "companion".

In the 2020 song, "Need It", by Migos ft. NBA Youngboy from the former's Culture III, Migos member Offset sings during the chorus: "Then I leave her, I can’t get caught up, I can’t be on Cheaters".

In the song, "Hats Off" by Lil Baby & Lil Durk (off their collaborative project, The Voice of the Heroes, released in 2021), featured artist on the track, Travis Scott, raps during his verse: "Sorry, gotta fuck on the low, I can't make Cheaters." Scott was accused of cheating during his high-profile relationship with model/socialite Kylie Jenner.
