= List of Little Britches Rodeo episodes =

Little Britches Rodeo is a television series airing on RFD-TV western lifestyle documents the lives of rodeo contestants and rodeo competition from the National Little Britches Rodeo Association Finals. Each season features over 100 interviews and stories. Dustin Hodge is the series showrunner. There are over 262 episodes and 10 seasons.

Season	Episodes	Originally released	
Season	Episodes	First released	Last released
1	26	March 27, 2013	September 4, 2013
2	26	November 27, 2013	May 14, 2014
3	26	October 1, 2014	March 25, 2015
4	26	September 30, 2015	May 30, 2016
5	26	November 2, 2016	April 26, 2017
6	26	October 4, 2017	March 28, 2018
7	26	October 10, 2018	April 3, 2019
8	26	October 9, 2019	April 20, 2020
9	26	October 7, 2020	April 18, 2021
10	26	November 13, 2021	April 20, 2022

== Episodes ==
=== Season 1 ===
Series No.	Season No.	Episode Name	Original Air Date
1	1	Little Wrangler Poles and Jr. Boys Bulls	March 27, 2013
2	2	World Champs, Little Wrangler Poles and Jr. Boys Bulls	April 3, 2013
3	3	Jr. Team Roping and Sr. Girls Trail	April 10, 2013
4	4	World Champs, Jr. Team Roping and Sr. Girls Trail	April 17, 2013
5	5	Jr. Boys Breakaway and Jr. Girls Trail	April 24, 2013
6	6	World Champs, Jr. Boys Breakaway and Jr. Girls Trail	May 1, 2013
7	7	Jr. Boy Goats and Sr. Girls Barrels	May 8, 2013
8	8	World Champs, Jr. Boy Goats and Sr. Girl Barrels	May 15, 2013
9	9	Little Wrangler Flags and Sr. Tie-down Roping	May 15, 2013
10	10	World Champs, Little Wrangler Flags and Sr. Tie-down Roping	May 22, 2013
11	11	Jr. Girls Barrel and Sr. Steer Wrestling	May 29, 2013
12	12	Jr. Girls Barrel and Sr. Steer Wrestling p2	June 5, 2013
13	13	Jr. Girls Breakaway and Sr. Team Roping	June 12, 2013
14	14	World Champs, Jr. Girls Breakaway and Sr. Team Roping	June 12, 2013
15	15	Jr. Boys Flag and Sr. Girls Goats	June 26, 2013
16	16	World Champs, Jr. Boys Flag and Sr. Girls Goats	July 3, 2013
17	17	Little Wrangler Barrels and Jay & Holly	July 10, 2013
18	18	World Champs, Little Wrangler Barrels and Sr. Bareback	July 17, 2013
19	19	Jr. Girls Poles and NLBRA Judges	July 24, 2013
20	20	World Champs, Jr. Girls Poles and Sr. Saddle Broncs	July 31, 2013
21	21	Jr. Ribbon and Sr. Breakaway Roping	August 1, 2013
22	22	World Champs, Jr. Ribbon and Sr. Breakaway Roping	August 8, 2013
23	23	Little Wrangler Goats and Sr. Girls Poles	August 15, 2013
24	24	World Champs, Little Wrangler Goat s and Sr. Girls Poles	August 22, 2013
25	25	Jr. Girls Goats and Sr. Bulls	August 29, 2013
26	26	World Champs, Jr. Girls Goats and Sr. Bulls	September 4, 2013

=== Season 2 ===
Series No.	Season No.	Episode Name	Original Air Date
27	1	Preview to the 2013 Finals	November 27, 2013
28	2	Jr Boys Bulls	December 4, 2013
29	3	Jr Girls Breakaway and Little Wrangler Barrels	December 11, 2013
30	4	Senior Boys Tie-Down Roping	December 18, 2013
31	5	Junior Girls Barrels	December 25, 2013
32	6	Jr Boys Flags and CSU Vets	January 1, 2014
33	7	Senior. Boys Steer Wrestling and Little Wrangler Goats	January 8, 2014
34	8	Junior Dally Roping	January 15, 2014
35	9	Senior Girls Trail	January 22, 2014
36	10	Junior Boys Goats	January 29, 2014
37	11	Senior Boys Bareback Bronc Riding	February 5, 2014
38	12	Junior Boys Breakaway and Little Wrangler Poles	February 12, 2014
39	13	Junior Girls Poles	February 19, 2014
40	14	Senior Girls Goats	February 26, 2014
41	15	Junior Girls Pole Bending	March 5, 2014
42	16	Sr. Boys Saddle Bronc	March 12, 2014
423	17	Junior Team Roping	March 19, 2014
44	18	Senior Team Roping	March 26, 2014
45	19	Senior Girls Pole Bending	April 2, 2014
46	20	Senior Girls Barrels	April 9, 2014
47	21	Junior Girls Goats	April 16, 2014
48	22	Senior Girls Breakaway and Little Wrangler Flags	April 23, 2014
49	23	Senior Boys Bulls	April 30, 2014
50	24	Best of the Best Part1	May 7, 2014
51	25	Bloopers and Comparisons	May 14, 2014
52	26	Best of the Best Part2	May 21, 2014

=== Season 3 ===
Series No.	Season No.	Episode Name	Original Air Date
53	1	2014 Preview	October 1, 2014
54	2	Junior Boys Bulls	October 8, 2014
55	3	Little Wrangler Barrels & Junior Girls Breakaway	October 15, 2014
56	4	Senior Boys Tie-Down Roping	October 22, 2014
57	5	Junior Girls Barrels	October 29, 2014
58	6	Jr Boys Flags	November 5, 2014
59	7	Senior. Boys Steer Wrestling and Little Wrangler Goats	November 12, 2014
60	8	Junior Dally Roping	November 19, 2014
61	9	Senior Girls Trail	November 26, 2014
62	10	Junior Boys Goats	December 3, 2014
63	11	Senior Boys Bareback Bronc Riding	December 10, 2014
64	12	Junior Boys Breakaway and Little Wrangler Poles	December 17, 2014
65	13	Junior Girls Poles	December 24, 2014
66	14	Senior Girls Goats	December 31, 2014
67	15	Junior Girls Trails	January 7, 2015
68	16	Senior Boys Saddle Bronc Riding	January 14, 2015
69	17	Junior Team Roping	January 21, 2015
70	18	Senior Team Roping	January 28, 2015
71	19	Senior Girls Pole Bending	February 4, 2015
72	20	Senior Girls Barrels	February 11, 2015
73	21	Junior Girls Goats	February 18, 2015
74	22	Little Wrangler Barrels & Senior Girls Breakaway	February 25, 2015
75	23	Senior Boys Bulls	March 4, 2015
76	24	Best of the Best Part1	March 11, 2015
77	25	Best of the Best Part2	March 18, 2015
78	26	All Around World Champions	March 25, 2015

=== Season 4 ===
Series No.	Season No.	Episode Name	Original Air Date
79	1	Preview to the 2015 Finals	September 30, 2015
80	2	Junior Boys Bulls 2015	October 7, 2015
81	3	Little Wrangler Barrels & Junior Girls Breakaway 2015	October 14, 2015
82	4	Senior Boys Tie-Down Roping2015	October 28, 2015
83	5	Junior Girls Barrels 2015	November 4, 2015
84	6	Jr Boys Flags 2015	November 11, 2015
85	7	Senior. Boys Steer Wrestling and Little Wrangler Goats 2015	November 18, 2015
86	8	Junior Dally Roping 2015	November 25, 2015
87	9	Senior Girls Trail 2015	December 2, 2015
88	10	Junior Boys Goats 2015	December 9, 2015
89	11	Senior Boys Bareback Bronc Riding 2015	December 16, 2015
90	12	Junior Boys Breakaway and Little Wrangler Poles 2015	December 23, 2015
91	13	Junior Girls Poles 2015	December 30, 2015
92	14	Senior Girls Goats 2015	January 6, 2016
93	15	Junior Girls Trails 2015	January 13, 2016
94	16	Senior Boys Saddle Bronc Riding 2015	January 20, 2016
95	17	Junior Team Roping 2015	January 27, 2016
96	18	Senior Team Roping 2015	February 3, 2016
97	19	Senior Girls Pole Bending 2015	February 10, 2016
98	20	Senior Girls Barrels 2015	February 17, 2016
99	21	Junior Girls Goats 2015	February 24, 2016
100	22	Little Wrangler Barrels & Senior Girls Breakaway 2015	March 2, 2016
101	23	Senior Boys Bulls 2015	March 9, 2016
102	24	Best of the Best 2015	March 16, 2016
103	25	All Around World Champions 2015	March 23, 2016
104	26	Trail Course 2015	March 30, 2016

=== Season 5 ===
Series No.	Season No.	Episode Name	Original Air Date
105	1	Junior Girls Breakaway 2016	November 2, 2016
106	2	Sr Ribbon Roping 2016	November 9, 2016
107	3	LW Barrels 2016	November 16, 2016
108	4	Sr Boy Tiedown 2016	November 23, 2016
109	5	Jr Girls Barrels 2016	November 30, 2016
110	6	JR Boys Flags 2016	December 7, 2016
111	7	LW Goats 2016	December 14, 2016
112	8	Sr Boys Steer Wrestling 2016	December 21, 2016
113	9	Jr Ribbon Roping 2016	December 28, 2016
114	10	Jr Boys Goats 2016	January 4, 2017
115	11	Senior Boys Bareback Broncs 2016	January 11, 2017
116	12	Trail Course 2016	January 18, 2017
117	13	Junior Boys Breakaway 2016	January 25, 2017
118	14	Little Wrangler Poles 2016	February 1, 2017
119	15	Junior Girls Poles 2016	February 8, 2017
120	16	Senior Girls Goats 2016	February 15, 2017
121	17	Junior Team Roping 2016	February 22, 2017
122	18	Senior Team Roping 2016	March 1, 2017
123	19	Senior Girls Barrels 2016	March 8, 2017
124	20	Senior Girl Pole Bending 2016	March 15, 2017
125	21	Junior Girls Goats 2016	March 22, 2017
126	22	Little Wrangler Flags 2016	March 29, 2017
127	23	Senior Girls Breakaway Roping 2016	April 5, 1017
128	24	Junior Boys Bulls 2016	April 12, 1017
129	25	Senior Girls Barrels 2016	April 19, 1017
130	26	Senior Boys Bulls 2016	April 26, 1017

=== Season 6 ===
Series No.	Season No.	Episode Name	Original Air Date
131	1	Senior Boys Bareback Steers 2017	October 4, 2017
132	2	Senior Team Roping 2017	October 11, 2017
133	3	Little Wrangler Barrels 2017	October 18, 2017
134	4	Senior Boys Tiedown Roping 2017	October 25, 2017
135	5	Junior Girls Barrels 2017	November 1, 2017
136	6	Junior Boys Flag Racing 2017	November 8, 2017
137	7	Senior Girls Barrels & LW Goats 2017	November 15, 2017
138	8	Senior Boys Steer Wrestling 2017	November 22, 2017
139	9	Junior Ribbon Roping 2017	November 29, 2017
140	10	Junior Boys Goats 2017	December 6, 2017
141	11	Senior Boys Saddle Bronc 2017	December 13, 2017
142	12	Senior Girls Trail Course 2017	December 20, 2017
143	13	Junior Girls Trail Course 2017	December 27, 2017
144	14	Little Wrangler Poles 2017	January 3, 2018
145	15	Junior Girls Poles 2017	January 10, 2018
146	16	Senior Girls Goats 2017	January 17, 2018
147	17	Jr Boys Saddle Bronc 2017	January 24, 2018
148	18	Junior Team Roping 2017	January 31, 2018
149	19	Senior Ribbon Roping 2017	February 7, 2018
150	20	Senior Girls Pole Bending 2017	February 14, 2018
151	21	Junior Girls Goats 2017	February 21, 2018
152	22	Little Wrangler Flag Racing 2017	February 28, 2018
153	23	Junior Boys Bareback Steer 2017	March 7, 2018
154	24	Junior Boys Bulls 2017	March 14, 2018
155	25	Senior Girls Barrels 2017	March 21, 2018
156	26	Senior Boys Bulls 2017	March 28, 2018

=== Season 7 ===
Series No.	Season No.	Episode Name	Original Air Date
157	1	Senior Boys Bareback Steers 2018	October 10, 2018
158	2	Senior Team Roping 2018	October 17, 2018
159	3	Little Wrangler Barrels 2018	October 24, 2018
160	4	Senior Boys Tiedown Roping 2018	October 31, 2018
161	5	Junior Girls Barrels 2018	November 7, 2018
162	6	Junior Boys Flag Racing 2018	November 14, 2018
163	7	Senior Girls Barrels & LW Goats 2018	November 21, 2018
164	8	Senior Boys Steer Wrestling 2018	November 28, 2018
165	9	Junior Ribbon Roping 2018	December 5, 2018
166	10	Junior Boys Goats 2018	December 12, 2018
167	11	Senior Boys Saddle Bronc 2018	December 19, 2018
168	12	Senior Girls Trail Course 2018	December 26, 2018
169	13	Junior Girls Trail Course 2018	January 2, 2019
170	14	Little Wrangler Poles 2018	January 9, 2019
171	15	Junior Girls Poles 2018	January 16, 2019
172	16	Senior Girls Goats 2018	January 23, 2019
173	17	Jr Boys Saddle Bronc 2018	January 30, 2019
174	18	Junior Team Roping 2018	February 6, 2019
175	19	Senior Ribbon Roping 2018	February 13, 2019
176	20	Senior Girls Pole Bending 2018	February 20, 2019
177	21	Junior Girls Goats 2018	February 27, 2019
178	22	Little Wrangler Flag Racing 2018	March 6, 2019
179	23	Junior Boys Bareback Steer 2018	March 13, 2019
180	24	Junior Boys Bulls 2018	March 20, 2019
181	25	Senior Girls Barrels 2018	March 27, 2019
182	26	Senior Boys Bulls 2018	April 3, 2019

=== Season 8 ===
Series No.	Season No.	Episode Name	Original Air Date
183	1	Senior Boys Bareback Steers 2019	October 9, 2019
184	2	Senior Team Roping 2019	October 16, 2019
185	3	Little Wrangler Barrels 2019	October 23, 2019
186	4	Senior Boys Tiedown Roping 2019	October 30, 2019
187	5	Junior Girls Barrels 2019	November 6, 2019
188	6	Junior Boys Flag Racing 2019	November 13, 2019
189	7	Senior Girls Barrels & LW Goats 2019	November 20, 2019
190	8	Senior Boys Steer Wrestling 2019	November 27, 2019
191	9	Junior Ribbon Roping 2019	December 4, 2019
192	10	Junior Boys Goats 2019	December 11, 2019
193	11	Senior Boys Saddle Bronc 2019	December 18, 2019
194	12	Senior Girls Trail Course 2019	December 26, 2019
195	13	Junior Girls Trail Course 2019	January 1, 2020
196	14	Little Wrangler Poles 2019	January 8, 2020
197	15	Junior Girls Poles 2019	January 15, 2020
198	16	Senior Girls Goats 2019	January 22, 2020
199	17	Jr Boys Saddle Bronc 2019	January 29, 2020
200	18	Junior Team Roping 2019	February 5, 2020
201	19	Senior Ribbon Roping 2019	February 12, 2020
202	20	Senior Girls Pole Bending 2019	February 19, 2020
203	21	Junior Girls Goats 2019	February 26, 2020
204	22	Little Wrangler Flag Racing 2019	March 4, 2020
205	23	Junior Boys Bareback Steer 2019	March 11, 2020
206	24	Junior Boys Bulls 2019	March 18, 2020
207	25	Senior Girls Barrels 2019	March 25, 2020
208	26	Senior Boys Bulls 2019	April 1, 2020

=== Season 9 ===
Series No.	Season No.	Episode Name	Original Air Date
209	1	Senior Boys Bareback Steers 2020	October 7, 2020
210	2	Senior Team Roping 2020	October 14, 2020
211	3	Little Wrangler Barrels 2020	October 21, 2020
212	4	Senior Boys Tiedown Roping 2020	October 28, 2020
213	5	Junior Girls Barrels 2020	November 4, 2020
214	6	Junior Boys Flag Racing 2020	November 11, 2020
215	7	Senior Girls Barrels & LW Goats 2020	November 18, 2020
216	8	Senior Boys Steer Wrestling 2020	November 25, 2020
217	9	Junior Ribbon Roping 2020	December 2, 2020
218	10	Junior Boys Goats 2020	December 9, 2020
219	11	Senior Boys Saddle Bronc 2020	December 16, 2020
220	12	Senior Girls Trail Course 2020	December 23, 2020
221	13	Junior Girls Trail Course 2020	December 30, 2020
222	14	Little Wrangler Poles 2020	January 6, 2021
223	15	Junior Boys Bulls 2020	January 13, 2021
234	16	Senior Girls Goats 2020	January 20, 2021
225	17	Jr Boys Saddle Bronc 2020	February 3, 2021
226	18	Junior Team Roping 2020	February 10, 2021
227	19	Senior Ribbon Roping 2020	February 17, 2021
228	20	Senior Girls Pole Bending 2020	February 24, 2021
229	21	Junior Girls Goats 2020	March 3, 2021
230	22	Junior Team Roping 2020	February 10, 2021
231	23	Senior Ribbon Roping 2020	February 17, 2021
232	24	Senior Girls Pole Bending 2020	February 24, 2021
233	25	Junior Girls Goats 2020	March 3, 2021
234	26	Junior Girls Goats 2020	March 3, 2021

=== Season 10 ===
Series No.	Season No.	Episode Name	Original Air Date
235	1	Senior Boys Bareback Steers 2021	October 13, 2021
236	2	Senior Team Roping 2021	October 20, 2021
237	3	Little Wrangler Barrels 2021	November 3, 2021
238	4	Senior Boys Tiedown Roping 2021	November 10, 2021
239	5	Junior Girls Barrels 2021	November 17, 2021
240	6	Junior Boys Flag Racing 2021	November 24, 2021
241	7	Senior Girls Barrels & LW Goats 2021	December 1, 2021
242	8	Senior Boys Steer Wrestling 2021	December 15, 2021
243	9	Junior Ribbon Roping 2021	December 22, 2021
244	10	Junior Boys Goats 2021	December 29, 2021
245	11	Senior Boys Saddle Bronc 2021	January 5, 2022
246	12	Senior Girls Trail Course 2021	January 12, 2022
247	13	Junior Girls Trail Course 2021	January 19, 2022
248	14	Little Wrangler Poles 2021	January 26, 2022
249	15	Junior Boys Bulls 2021	February 2, 2022
