= Little Britches on the Road =

- Genre: Travel documentary Reality; Documentary
- Created by: Dustin Hodge
- Narrated by: Donna Hodge
- Country of origin: United States
- Original language: English
- No. of seasons: 6
- No. of episodes: 17

Production
- Executive producer: Dustin Hodge
- Camera setup: Multi-camera
- Running time: 22–26 minutes
- Production companies: Hodge Media Group; HM Group

Original release
- Network: RFD-TV
- Release: March 6, 2013 – present

Little Britches on the Road is an American travel show on RFD-TV and premiered March 6, 2013.

The series highlights rural communities across the United States. It is a spin-off of Little Britches Rodeo.

== Overview ==
On the Road is a travel documentary series that focuses on small towns, rural areas, and the western lifestyle. It features gorgeous scenery and rural living at its best.

=== Narration ===
Every episode has been narrated by Donna Hodge.

== Notable guests ==
- Mary Fallin - Governor of Oklahoma
- Jim Reese - Oklahoma Secretary of Agriculture
- Micah McKinney - Owner of Lazy E
- Leslie McKinney - Owner of Lazy E
- Shorty Koger - Shorty's Cowboy Hattery

== Locations featured ==
- Searcy, Arkansas
- DeRidder, Louisiana
- Falcon, Colorado
- Guthrie, Oklahoma
- Edmond, Oklahoma
- Neighborhoods of Oklahoma City
- Torrington, Wyoming

== Episodes ==
=== Series overview ===
Season	Episodes	Originally released	
Season	Episodes	First released	Last released
1	3	March 6, 2013	March 20, 2013
2	3	November 5, 2013	November 19, 2013
3	4	September 3, 2014	September 24, 2014
4	2	September 2, 2015	September 9, 2015
5	2	January 5, 2016	January 12, 2016
6	3	September 13, 2017	September 27, 2017

=== Season 1 (2013) ===
No. overall	No. in season	Title	Original release date
1	1	"Searcy Arkansas Part 1"	March 6, 2013
2	2	"Searcy Arkansas Part 2"	March 13, 2013
3	3	"Searcy Arkansas Part 3"	March 20, 2013

=== Season 2 (2013) ===
No. overall	No. in season	Title	Original release date
4	1	"DeRidder Louisiana Part 1"	November 5, 2013
5	2	"DeRidder Louisiana Part 2"	November 12, 2013
6	3	"DeRidder Louisiana Part 3"	November 19, 2013

=== Season 3 (2014) ===
No. overall	No. in season	Title	Original release date
7	1	"Torrington Wyoming Part 1"	September 3, 2014
8	2	"Torrington Wyoming Part 2"	September 10, 2014
9	3	"Falcon Colorado Part 1"	September 17, 2014
10	4	"Falcon Colorado Part 2"	September 24, 2014

=== Season 4 (2015) ===
No. overall	No. in season	Title	Original release date
11	1	"Oklahoma Part 1"	September 2, 2015
12	2	"Oklahoma Part 2"	September 9, 2015

=== Season 5 (2016) ===
No. overall	No. in season	Title	Original release date
13	1	"Lazy E Part 1"	January 5, 2016
14	2	"Lazy E Part 2"	January 12, 2016

=== Season 6 (2017) ===
No. overall	No. in season	Title	Original release date
15	1	"Best of NLBRA Part 1"	September 13, 2017
16	2	"Best of NLBRA Part 2"	September 20, 2017
17	3	"Best of NLBRA Part 3"	September 27, 2017
