= Vermont Maple Festival =

Coordinates: 44°48′28″N 73°4′59″W

The Vermont Maple Festival is a food and arts celebration held at St. Albans in the U.S. state of Vermont.

The festival is a three-day event held annually over the last weekend in April. During the event, there are exhibits and demonstrations, entertainment, and a craft show all dedicated to maple syrup. It takes place to celebrate the first harvest of the year in Vermont. A pancake breakfast is also held, a parade, antiques show, and the crowning of the festivals' Maple King and Maple Queen.

== See also ==
- Vermont Maple Foundation
- Vermont Maple Sugar Makers' Association
