= Tommy Habeeb Enterprises =

- Type: Private
- Industry: Television
- Founded: 2001
- Headquarters: Dallas, Texas, United States
- Key people: Tommy Habeeb, CEO
- Website: http://www.tommyhabeeb.com/

Tommy Habeeb Enterprises is an entertainment production company headed by Tommy Habeeb. Current shows in production include STAG, Billionaires Car Club hosted by Andrew Firestone, and Art of War 3 which airs live on September 1, 2007 on Events iN Demand and Dish Network.

== Current Shows ==
- Billionaires Car Club
- Art of War 3
