= Dale DeWitt =

American politician (born 1950)

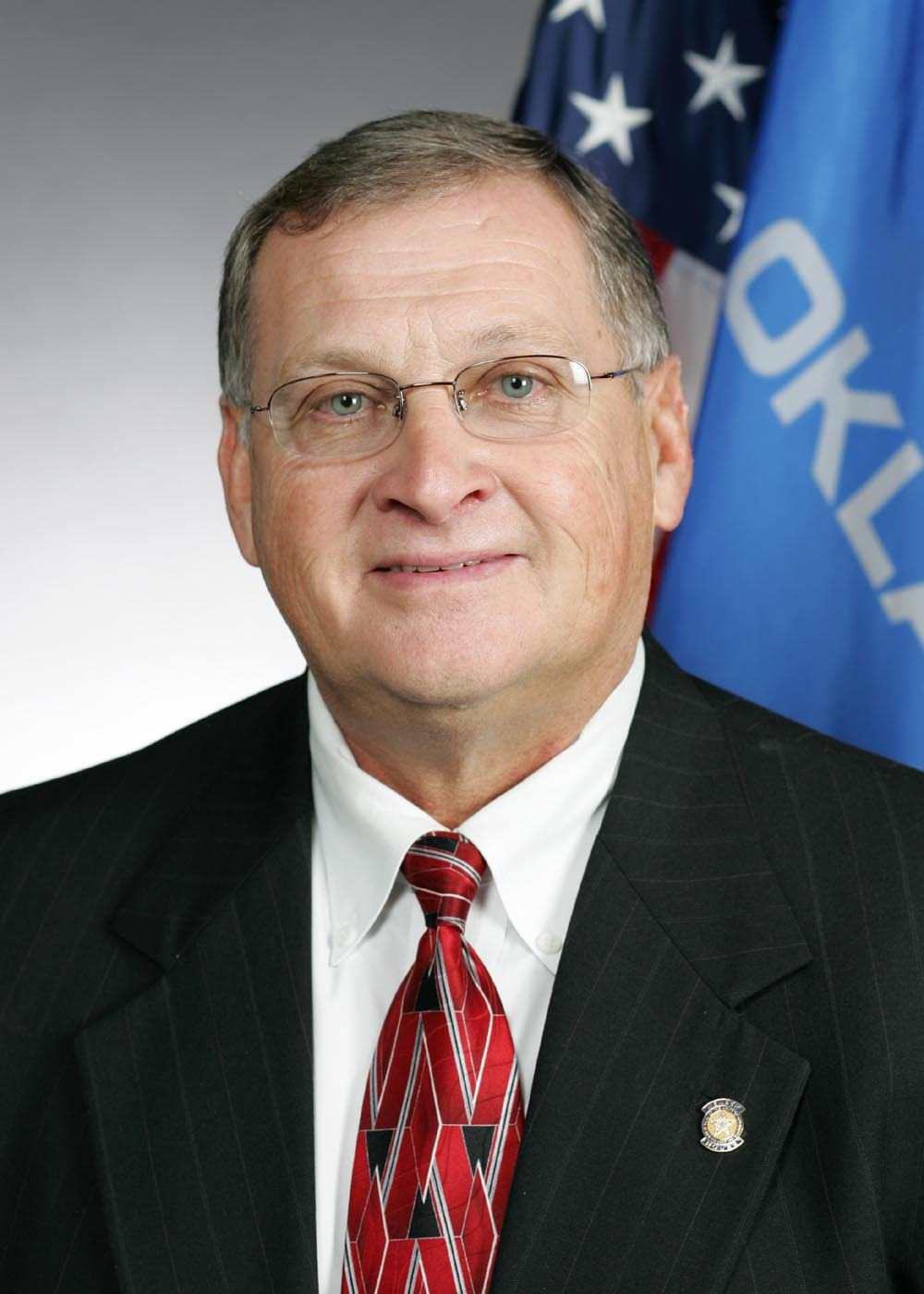

House Majority Leader
- In office 2011–2012

Member of the Oklahoma House of Representatives from the 38th district
- In office August 14, 2001 – 2014
- Preceded by: Jim Reese
- Succeeded by: John Pfeiffer

Personal details
- Born: 17 January 1950 (age 76) Blackwell, Kay County; Oklahoma, United States
- Party: Republican
- Spouse: Carol Grell DeWitt
- Children: Garrett DeWitt, Camille Holt
- Education: Northern Oklahoma College; Oklahoma State University
- Occupation: Rancher, farmer
- Profession: Farmer, rancher, retired educator

Dale DeWitt (born January 17, 1950) is a United States politician from Oklahoma who serves in the Oklahoma House of Representatives. He served as Majority Leader and Majority Floor Leader during 2011 and 2012.

== Early life and education ==
DeWitt was born in Blackwell in Kay County in northern Oklahoma. In 1970, he received an associate degree from Northern Oklahoma College in Tonkawa. He then procured his Bachelor of Science in 1973 in agriculture education from Oklahoma State University at Stillwater.

DeWitt worked as an educator from 1973-2001, primarily for the Braman, Oklahoma school district.

== Political career ==
DeWitt was elected to the Oklahoma House of Representatives in a special election in 2001 to fill the seat vacated by fellow Republican Jim Reese, who joined the George W. Bush administration in Washington, D.C.

DeWitt served as part of the leadership team under House Speaker Kris Steele, serving as Majority Leader and Majority Floor Leader. He contributed to and co-authored the redistricting bill in 2011.

In the 2012 legislative session, DeWitt authored legislation to protect Oklahoma's food supply against contamination from ricin, an extract of castor beans.
