= Vermont Maple Sugar Makers' Association =

American non-government agricultural organization

- Formation: 1893
- Location: United States
- Fields: Agriculture

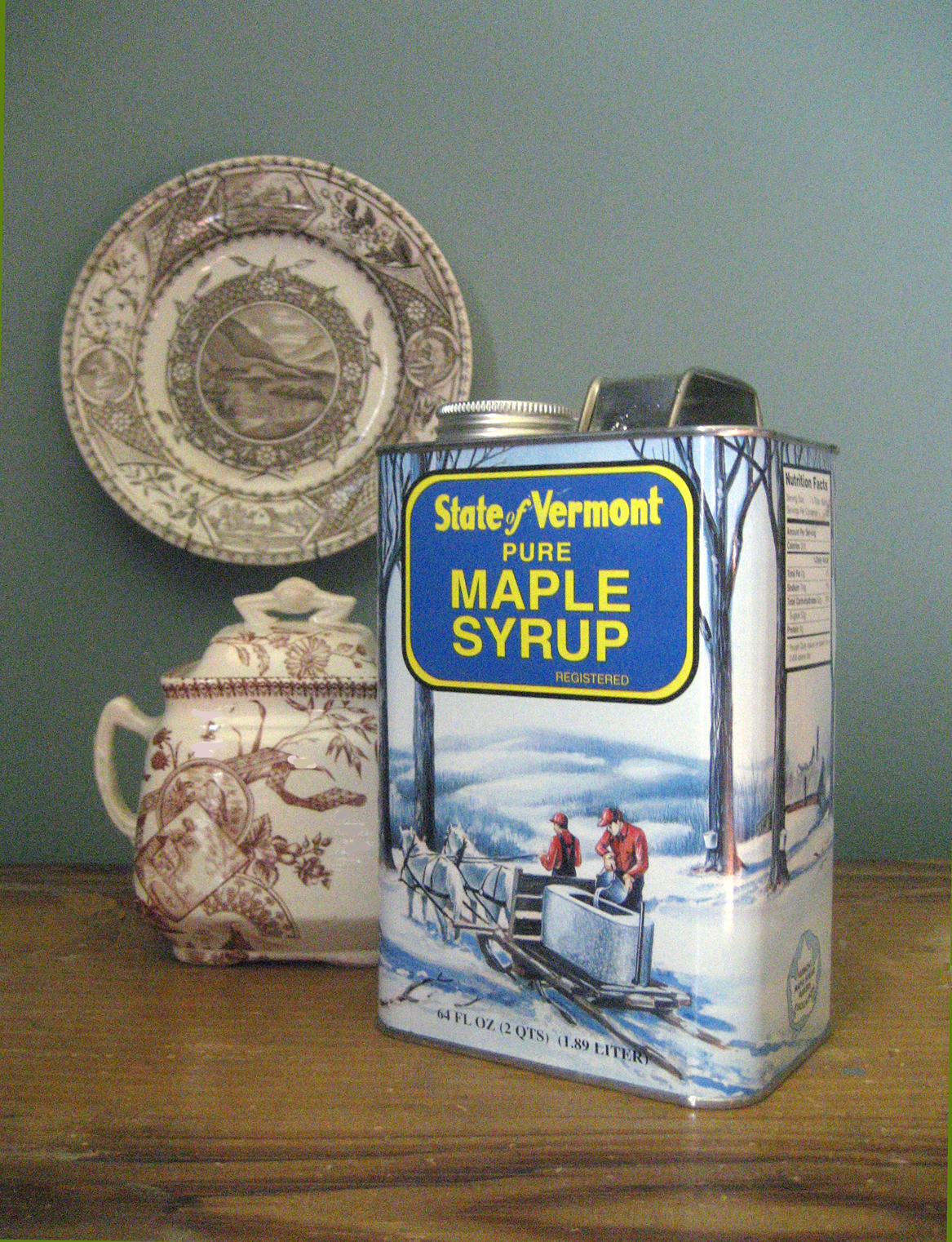
Maple syrup packaged in a tin of the Vermont Maple Sugar Makers' Association

The Vermont Maple Sugar Makers' Association (VMSMA), founded in 1893, is one of the oldest non-government agricultural organizations in the United States. The organization is headquartered at Westford in the U.S. state of Vermont.

== Mission ==
The Vermont Maple Sugar Makers' Association mission is to safeguard the tradition of maple sugarmaking while maintaining the highest standards of production and product quality. The VMSMA works with local maple sugarmakers, the Vermont sugarmakers, the Vermont Agency of Agriculture Food and Markets, the United States Department of Agriculture, and international agencies and non-government organizations to protect the integrity and purity of maple syrup.

The VMSMA educates consumers by providing information on how maple syrup is made, its nutritional value, how to cook with it, and promotes visits to sugar houses where the public can watch maple syrup being made. As maple sugarmaking is intertwined with Vermont's culture and history the VMSMA works with its related organization, the non-profit Vermont Maple Foundation to provide demonstrations, arranges visits and events, and presents the story of Vermont maple sugarmaking.

== See also ==
- List of foods made from maple
