= Longing to Tell =

2003 book by Tricia Rose

Longing to Tell: Black Women Talk About Sexuality And Intimacy
- Author: Tricia Rose
- Language: English
- Subject: Non-fiction, African-American women's sexuality
- Published: 2003 (Farrar, Straus and Giroux)
- Publication place: United States
- Media type: Print (Hardback)
- Pages: 415
- ISBN: 9780374190613
- OCLC: 50695245

Longing to Tell: Black Women Talk About Sexuality And Intimacy is a 2003 book by Tricia Rose. It comprises 20 oral histories by African-American women from different socio-economic backgrounds and ages telling their stories about various aspects of sexuality.

== Reception ==
The New York Times noted that it is "the first compilation of black women's oral histories about all aspects of sexuality" and that it has been applauded by scholars like Henry Louis Gates Jr., while, in a discussion about her book The Politics & Passion, Gloria Wekker expressed disappointment with Longing to Tell.

Longing to Tell has also been reviewed by Booklist, Publishers Weekly, Signs: Journal of Women in Culture and Society, Women's Review of Books, Library Journal, Multicultural Review, and Essence.
