= The Arkansas River: From Leadville to Lamar =

2018 American documentary film

- Genre: Documentary
- Written by: Samuel Ebersole
- Directed by: Samuel Ebersole
- Country of origin: United States
- Original language: English

Production
- Producers: Samuel Ebersole; Dustin Hodge
- Running time: 57 minutes

Original release
- Network: KRMA
- Release: May 31, 2018

The Arkansas River: From Leadville to Lamar is a 2018 American documentary film about the agricultural, environmental, and recreation aspects of the Arkansas River in the US state of Colorado. The film was written and directed by Samuel Ebersole and produced by Samuel Ebersole and Dustin Hodge.

== Content ==
The film examines the economic impact of recreation and fishing on the Arkansas River. The documentary also examines the needs and issues of the Arkansas River Basin Implementation Plan.

== Release ==
The documentary was released via the PBS. The film also had a number of screenings with panel discussions about water issues.
