= The Tight Rope =

Political podcast

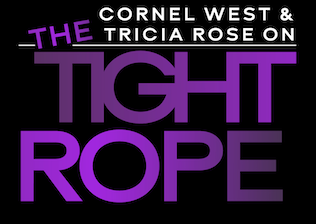
- Genre: Talk radio; Interview; Pop culture
- Format: Audio; video
- Language: English

Cast and voices
- Hosted by: Cornel West; Tricia Rose

Production
- Production: Cornel West; Tricia Rose; Jeremy Berry; James Artis; Ceyanne Dent; Dustin Hodge
- Length: Varies

Technical specifications
- Video format: YouTube
- Audio format: MP3

Publication
- No. of episodes: 89 (as of September 9, 2021)
- Original release: July 23, 2020 – September 9, 2021
- Updates: Weekly (Thursdays)

The Tight Rope is a weekly podcast hosted by Cornel West and Tricia Rose. The episodes are generally one hour long, frequently feature guests, and are released every Thursday. Since June 2021, the podcast has been exclusively available on Patreon, with highlights uploaded on YouTube. The podcast covers issues of race, social affairs and culture. The show is produced by Ceyanna Dent and Dustin Hodge for SpkerBox Media. Several of the episodes were recorded in front of a live audience.

== History ==
The first episode featured Alexandria Ocasio-Cortez. Subsequent episodes have featured other political figures, thought leaders, actors, directors, and musicians. Some notable guests have included: Michael Moore, Jane Fonda, Roxane Gay, Mayim Bialik, Nikole Hannah-Jones, and Killer Mike.

== Format ==
Episodes are generally one hour long. The first 75 episodes are available for free via podcasting services and YouTube. The newest episodes are available to premium subscribers on Patreon, although each week a 15-minute teaser is posted for free. The series has a 4.9 rating on Apple Podcasts.

Two episodes have also focused on Cornel West's dispute with Harvard.
