= Black Noise (book) =

Black Noise: Rap Music and Black Culture in Contemporary America
- Author: Tricia Rose
- Language: English
- Subject: Rap music, US popular culture
- Published: 1994 (Wesleyan University Press)
- Publication place: USA
- Media type: Print (hardback, paperback)
- Pages: 237
- ISBN: 9780819562753
- OCLC: 610269566

Black Noise: Rap Music and Black Culture in Contemporary America is a 1994 book by Tricia Rose. It was released in hardback on April 29, 1994 through Wesleyan University Press.

== Synopsis ==
In the book, Rose examines rap music and black culture by looking at urban culture politics and rap's racial politics. She also reflects on videos, song lyrics, and interviews with musicians, producers, and other people involved with the rap music industry.

== Reception ==
American Music reviewed the work, which they felt was "a timely critique of the musical, social, and cultural relationships between rap music, black culture, and American society". Black Noise also received reviews from Popular Music and Contemporary Sociology, the latter of which called it an "exciting book and an essential text for those interested in popular culture, music, race, gender, postmodernism-all central aspects of contemporary U.S. culture."

It also received reviews from the African American Review, Notes, Educational Researcher, Journal of Communication, Publishers Weekly, and Choice Reviews.

Black Noise received a 1995 American Book Award.

It has also been acknowledged as one of the first books to critically study hip-hop.
