= Darris Love =

American actor

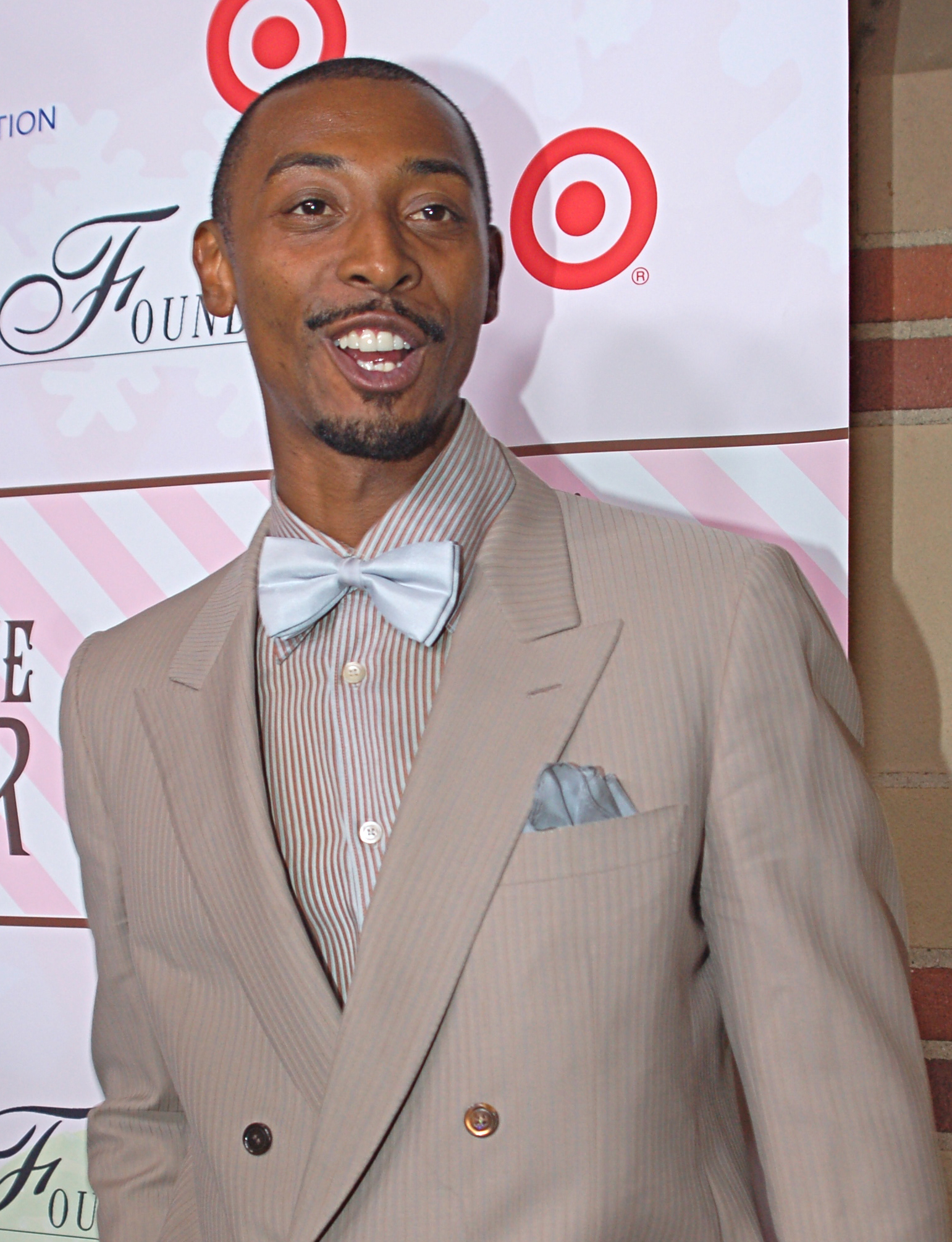
- Love in December 2010
- Born: April 26, 1980 (age 46); Los Angeles, California, U.S.
- Occupation: Actor
- Years active: 1994–present
- Website: kidsfeeding.org

Darris Love (born April 26, 1980) is an American actor, most notable for his role as Raymond 'Ray' Alvarado in Nickelodeon's The Secret World of Alex Mack. Since the show's ending in 1998, he has made appearances in episodes of numerous American television shows, including Angel, ER, CSI: Crime Scene Investigation, Without a Trace, and Undressed.

Darris appeared in the following music videos. "All for You" (2001), "Someone to Call My Lover" (2001) by Janet Jackson. "It's Not Fair" (2002) by singer Glenn Lewis. "All Eyez on Me" (2002) by Monica. "How to Love" (2011) by Lil Wayne.

His other credits include the films Gang Tapes (2001), Sucker Free City (2004), and Janky Promoters (2009).

== Early life ==
Darris Love was born in Los Angeles, California on April 26, 1980.

== Filmography ==
=== Film ===
Year	Title	Role	Notes
1994	Shrunken Heads	Freddie Thompson	
2001	Gang Tapes	Alonzo	
2006	Waist Deep	"Rock"	
2007	Urban Decay	"Da Bomb"	
2007	I Tried	Darnell	
2008	Bald	"The B"	
2009	Single Black Female	Darnell	
2009	A Day in the Life	"No Love"	
2009	Janky Promoters	"Mondo"	
2010	Nobody Smiling	Dante Ward	
2012	We the Party	"D-Money"	
2013	The Power of Love	Ray	
2015	Forgiveness	Narcotics Officer	
2016	Q	Tre	Short

=== Television ===
Year	Title	Role	Notes
1994–1998	The Secret World of Alex Mack	Ray Alvarado	Main role
1998	Sister, Sister	Jamal	"The Grass Is Always Finer", "Greek to Me", "Twins or Consequences"
1999	Passing Glory	Antoine Toussaint	TV film
2000	Undressed	Kevin	"Personal Ad", "Inflatable Girlfriend", "Zit"
2000	City of Angels	James Dawkins	"Assume the Position"
2000	City Guys	Dr. Deege	"Keep on the Download"
2000	ER	Hudson	"The Visit"
2001	NYPD Blue	Clem	"Daveless in New York"
2001	The District	Joe "Jo-Jo"	"Old Ghosts"
2001	Angel	George	"The Thin Dead Line", "Belonging"
2003	Scare Tactics	Darris	"Alien Attack"
2004	Sucker Free City	"Sleepy"	TV film
2004	Christmas at Water's Edge	Bonz	TV film
2006	Without a Trace	Orlando Davidson	"Blood Out"
2007	CSI: Crime Scene Investigation	Ezekiel Holstein	"Redrum", "A La Cart"
2013	Shameless	Gangster	"May I Trim Your Hedges?"
2013	Dice City	Shooter 2	TV film
2016	Dead of Night	Terrence McNeil	"Greed Ex-Boyfriend"
2017	It's Always Sunny in Philadelphia	Worker	"A Cricket's Tale"
