= Vermont Maple Foundation =

The Vermont Maple Foundation is a non-profit organization which describes its mission as being "to promote and protect the Vermont maple syrup brand and to work on its behalf with the State of Vermont and other appropriate organizations." The foundation's current president is Jacques Couture.

The Vermont Maple Foundation sponsors programs and events to educate the public and the media about the production of maple syrup and its importance to the Vermont economy, culture, and environment. The foundation works to make the public aware of how maple syrup producers help to sustain forests in Vermont as a working landscape.

== See also ==
- Vermont Maple Sugar Makers' Association
- Vermont Maple Festival
