= Gang Tapes =

2001 film directed by Adam Ripp

- Directed by: Adam Ripp
- Written by: Steven Wolfson; Adam Ripp
- Produced by: Adam Ripp; David H. Goodman
- Starring: Darris Love; Darontay McClendon; Don Cambell; Six Reasons; Trivell
- Cinematography: Keith L. Smith
- Edited by: Tina Imahara
- Music by: Coolio; Kurupt; Chino XL
- Distributed by: Lions Gate Films; Thomas Edison Invention
- Release date: February 2001
- Running time: 80 minutes
- Country: United States
- Languages: English, Spanish.

Gang Tapes is a 2001 crime film directed by Adam Ripp and starring Darris Love, Darontay McClendon, and Don Cambell. It has not been considered a mainstream success but did create a cult following.

== Plot ==
When teenaged Kris (Trivell) receives a camera from a friend that carjacks a visiting family member's vehicle, he also steals their video camera and begins recording gang life in South Central Los Angeles. Kris himself is a wannabe gang member, and the young man looks up to drug dealer Alonzo (Darris Love).

He excitedly follows the violent exploits of the crazed Cyril (Darontay McClendon). As Kris becomes more deeply involved with his dangerous new friends, his loving mother (Sonja Marie) tries to keep him off the streets.

== Cast ==
- Darris Love as Alonzo
- Darontay McClendon as Cyril
- Don Campbell as Travis
- Six Reasons as Erik
- Trivell as Kris
- Sonja Marie as Kris' Mother
- Aura Ruiz as Khandi
- Tasheia Woodward as Kris' Sister
- Dwayne Whitehead as Rodney
- Bruce Lemon as Jerald
- Tramonde Myers as "Big Loco"
- Lil' Skrappy as Kris' Killer / Rival In Red
- Celeste Bowen as Raven
- Bradrick Walker as "Eight Ball"
- Lance Peters as "Skeeter"
- Shirley Hill as Cyril's Mother
- Boo Kapone as Himself

== See also ==
- List of hood films
