= Janky Promoters =

2009 film directed by Marcus Raboy

- Theatrical release poster
- Directed by: Marcus Raboy
- Written by: Ice Cube
- Produced by: Matt Alvarez; Ice Cube
- Starring: Ice Cube; Mike Epps; Jeezy; Darris Love; Julio Oscar Mechoso; Tamala Jones; Lil' JJ; Glenn Plummer
- Cinematography: Tom Priestley Jr.
- Edited by: Robert Ivison
- Music by: John Murphy
- Production companies: Cube Vision; Dimension Films
- Distributed by: Third Rail Releasing
- Release date: October 16, 2009
- Running time: 85 minutes
- Country: United States
- Language: English
- Budget: $10 million
- Box office: $10,069

Janky Promoters is a 2009 American comedy film, starring Ice Cube and Mike Epps who play "janky" promoters who book rapper Jeezy to play at their concert, only to fail at doing it the right way and thus getting into more trouble than they bargained for.

== Plot ==
The film begins with a flash forward to a later scene in the movie in which Russell Redds (Cube) and Jellyroll (Epps) are running out of a concert being chased by an angry mob as they drive off in Russell's car. The plot starts off with Russell coming home late and sneaking into his wife's purse to get her checkbook. He then hears her wake up and pretends to sleep only to be caught by his wife who already knows what happened. This indicates that Russell does not have all the money for the concert yet.

Meanwhile, his co-partner Jellyroll is fooling around with another man's wife at a hotel only to be encountered by a television show's crew (a cameo appearance by Joey Greco) who hunts down people who cheat on their loved ones. Suddenly Gina's husband Ronnie, who is a cop, drives into the parking lot and starts to shoot at them from his cop car as Jellyroll and Gina escape by car.

Russell visits his mom and begs for money but is turned down and is forced to steal his wife's checkbook while she is in the shower. He checks up on his son, who goes by Yung Semore, and makes sure he is ready to open up for Young Jeezy to perform at the concert. He continues his plans by picking up Jellyroll and getting a rent-a-van to pick up Young Jeezy instead of getting a limo. He gets Jellyroll to pick them up from the airport as he runs errands around Modesto, California getting more money or getting hotel reservations for the rapper and his entourage.

After taking forever to arrive at the airport, Jellyroll finally shows up and picks the rapper up at the airport. He finds out that Jeezy wants some weed badly, so he decides to take them to the hood to get some. He meets up with his drug dealer Mondo who scolds him for getting weed for the rapper and asks if Jeezy can come to his after party. Jellyroll insists that the rapper wants $20,000 to show up and Mondo accepts and gives him the money. This is where things start to turn for the promoters as Jellyroll spends the $20,000 on clothes and jewelry instead of using it for the show to pay Jeezy his money.

From there, the movie turns wild and intense as Russell and Jellyroll try to figure out a way to get Jeezy to perform while dodging Mondo and his crew and getting the money to pay Jeezy to perform. After they were unable to do so, Jeezy calls off the show and leaves the venue in frustration. Upon the fans learning that Jeezy was not performing, the crowd angrily begins to rush the stage and riot. Russell and Jellyroll quickly drive away from the scene, only to be shot at by Mondo.

After Russell and Jellyroll successfully escaped, they are soon informed that many fans have arrived at Mondo's afterparty, as well as Young Jeezy himself. Jeezy does his performance, putting both Russell and Jellyroll back on top.

== Cast ==
- Ice Cube as Russell Redds
- Mike Epps as "Jellyroll"
- Young Jeezy as Himself
- Lahmard Tate as Young Percy
- Darris Love as "Mondo"
- Lil' JJ as Seymour "Yung Semore" Redds
- Julio Oscar Mechoso as John Glanville
- Glenn Plummer as Officer Ronnie Stixx
- Juanita Jennings as Momma
- Aloma Wright as Ms. Ann
- Jowharah Jones as Loli
- Joey Greco as Kevin MaLine
- Tamala Jones as Regina Stixx
- Leland White as K.K.
- Malik Barnhardt as C.W.
- Tiffany Haddish as Michelle
- Porscha Coleman as Sandra
- Kerisse Hutchinson as Lisa
- Reghan Alexander as Valerie

== Release ==
After being delayed several times, the film released to a limited release on October 16, 2009. The film's DVD was released on November 24, 2009, and also made available for purchase on iTunes in HD and Standard Definition on February 10, 2010.

In an interview, star Ice Cube stated that the film was unfinished, and that the DVD release was made without his knowledge while he was working on a deal for a wider release of the film.

== See also ==
- List of hood films
