= Clark James Gable =

American actor (1988–2019)

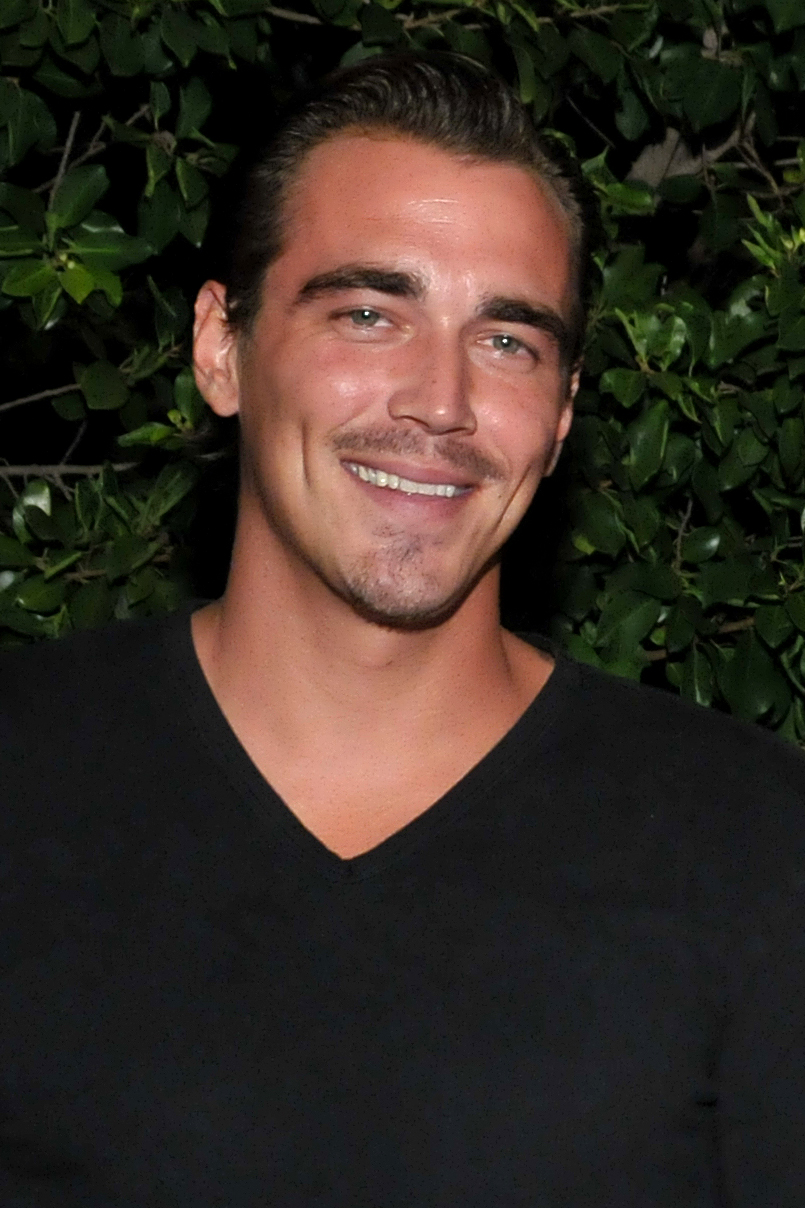
- Gable in October 2015
- Born: September 20, 1988; Malibu, California, U.S.
- Died: February 22, 2019 (aged 30); Dallas, Texas, U.S.
- Occupations: Actor; model; television host
- Years active: 2001–2019
- Children: 1
- Relatives: Clark Gable (paternal grandfather); Jason Scheff (stepfather); Judy Lewis (half-aunt); Jerry Scheff (step-grandfather)

Clark James Gable (September 20, 1988 – February 22, 2019), also known as Clark Gable III, was an American actor, model, and television host. Gable was a host of the television reality show Cheaters.

== Life and career ==
Gable was a grandson of actor Clark Gable, the son of John Clark Gable and Tracy Yarro, and had a younger sister who is an actress.

His stepfather was former Chicago bassist Jason Scheff.

Gable was an actor and businessman. He owned a men's fashion boutique and surfing line of clothing and accessories. He was the president of an online electronics store ClarkGableSpyGear.com.

Gable was arrested in 2011 for shining a laser pointer at a police helicopter in Los Angeles. He pleaded guilty and was sentenced to 10 days in jail and three years of probation.

Gable hosted the reality show Cheaters from seasons 13 to 15.

Gable had a daughter with his fiancée Summer.

== Death ==
On February 22, 2019, Gable, 30, died at Texas Health Presbyterian Hospital in Dallas of an accidental overdose on fentanyl, oxycodone, and alprazolam. He was discovered unresponsive in his bed that morning by his fiancée, Summer.
