= Tricia Rose =

American sociologist and author (born 1962)

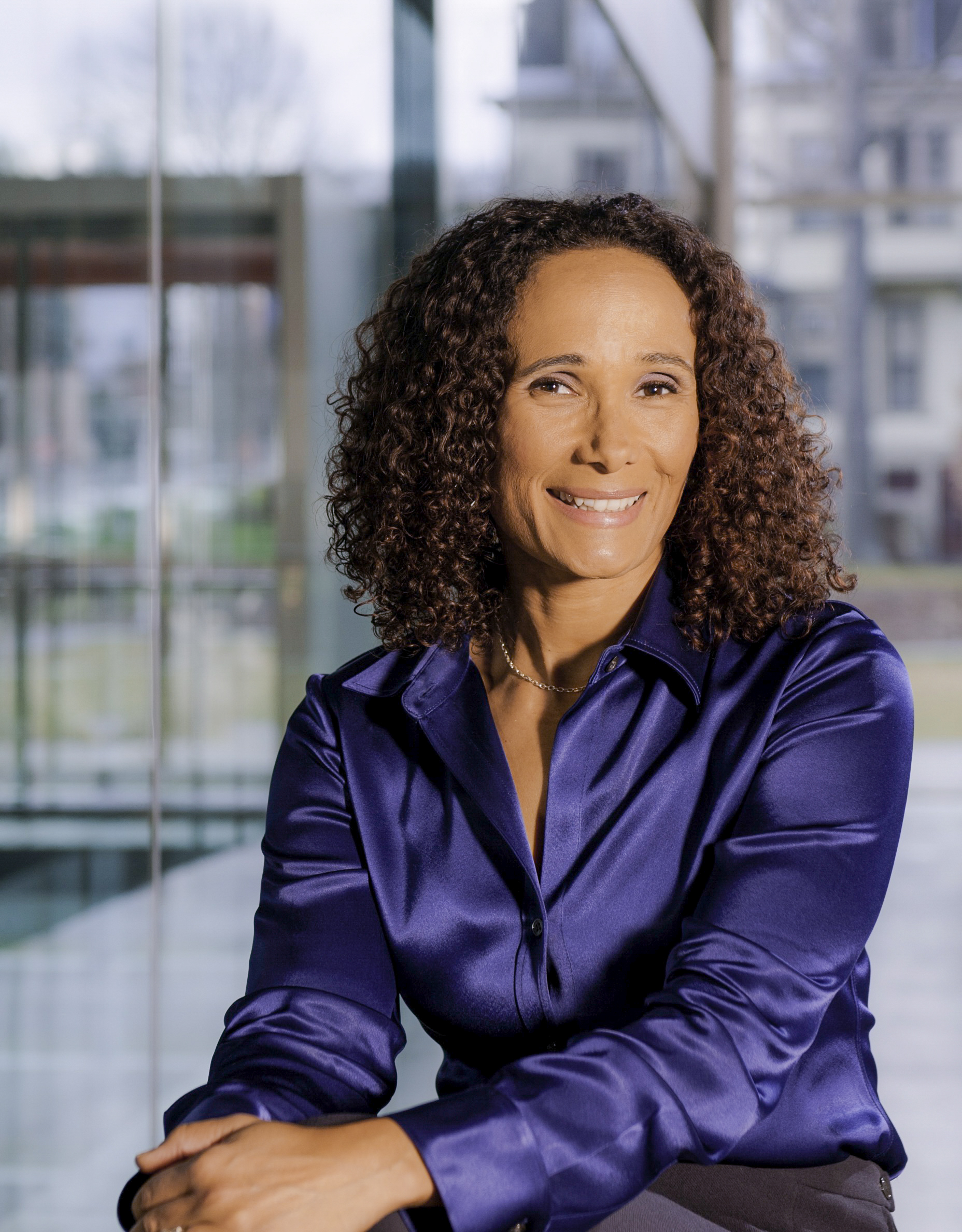
- Born: October 18, 1962 (age 63); New York, New York, U.S.
- Education: Yale University (BA); Brown University (PhD)
- Occupation: Academic
- Known for: Scholarly work on hip-hop and systemic racism.
- Notable work: Black Noise: Rap Music and Black Culture in Contemporary America, Longing to Tell: Black Women Talk About Sexuality And Intimacy, "The Hip Hop Wars: What We Talk About When We Talk About Hip Hop-and Why It Matters", Way Outta No Way (www.wayouttanoway.com)
- Awards: American Book Award from the Before Columbus Foundation in 1995 for "Black Noise"

Tricia Rose (born October 18, 1962) is an American sociologist and author who pioneered scholarship on hip hop. Her studies mainly probe the intersectionality of pop music and gender. Now at Brown University, she is a professor of Africana Studies and the director of the Systemic Racism and Resilience Project at the John Nicholas Brown Center for Advanced Study. In 2025, Rose launched Way Outta No Way, a dynamic web-based experience that blends a systems analysis of racism with compelling character-driven stories, supported by rigorous research. It demonstrates the power of Black life and culture to originate rich modes of human resistance and resilience. Rose also co-hosted a podcast, The Tight Rope, with Cornel West.

== Early life and education ==
Born in New York City, Rose lived in Harlem until 1970 when, at age seven, her family moved from their tenement building to Co-op City, a new and large complex of cooperative apartments in the northeast Bronx.

Rose earned a Bachelor of Arts in sociology from Yale University. Earning a PhD degree in American studies, partly under George Lipsitz, from Brown University, Rose became the first person in the United States to write a doctoral dissertation on hip hop.

== Academia and authorship ==
For nine years, Rose taught Africana studies at New York University. In 2002, she moved to the University of California, Santa Cruz, and in July 2003 became chair of its American Studies department.

Now at Brown University, Rose is the Chancellor's Professor of Africana Studies. From July 2013, to July 2024 she served as Director of the Center for Study of Race and Ethnicity in America and now directs the Systemic Racism Project based at CSREA.

Rose's first book, Black Noise, emerging from her doctoral dissertation on hip hop, sparked academic recognition of this subculture's legacy. The Village Voice placed it among the top 25 books of 1994, and the Before Columbus Foundation, in 1995, gave it an American Book Award.

== Books ==
- author, Black Noise: Rap Music and Black Culture in Contemporary America (Wesleyan University Press, 1994)
- author, Longing to Tell: Black Women Talk About Sexuality and Intimacy (Farrar, Straus & Giroux, 2003)
- author, The Hip Hop Wars: What We Talk About When We Talk About Hip Hop—and Why It Matters (Basic Books, 2008)
- author, Metaracism: How Systemic Racism Devastates Black Lives—and How We Break Free (Basic Books, 2024)
- contributor and, with Andrew Ross, editor, Microphone Fiends: Youth Music and Youth Culture (Routledge, 1994)
