= Mutual, Oklahoma =

- Town
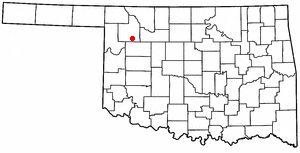
- Location of Mutual, Oklahoma
- Coordinates: 36°13′50″N 99°10′05″W
- Country: United States
- State: Oklahoma
- County: Woodward

Area
  - Total: 0.27 sq mi (0.69 km^{2})
  - Land: 0.27 sq mi (0.69 km^{2})
  - Water: 0 sq mi (0.00 km^{2})
- Elevation: 1,877 ft (572 m)

Population (2020)
  - Total: 63
  - Density: 237/sq mi (91.4/km^{2})
- Time zone: UTC-6 (Central (CST))
  - Summer (DST): UTC-5 (CDT)
- ZIP code: 73853
- Area code: 580
- FIPS code: 40-50150
- GNIS feature ID: 2413031

Mutual is a town in Woodward County, Oklahoma, United States. As of the 2020 census, Mutual had a population of 63. Incorporated in 1908, the town suffered under the agricultural depression after World War I and saw only minimal growth during the 1970s and 1980s.

== Geography ==
Mutual is located approximately 19 miles southeast of Woodward, the county seat.

According to the United States Census Bureau, the town has a total area of 0.3 square miles (0.78 km^{2}), all land.

== History ==
A "Mutual" post office was designated on June 4, 1895. The town was incorporated in 1908. In 1910, the town had two churches, a bank, a feed mill, a machine shop, and a dealer in poultry and dairy products. The town also had a hotel early on.

The town fared well until the post World War I agricultural depression and the construction of U.S. Highway 270, meant to bypass the town. The town continued to decline until petroleum exploration and production in the 1970s and 1980s gave it a short boost. Mutual ended the 20th century with a half dozen businesses and 76 residents, some of whom commute to Woodward or Seiling for work.

== Demographics ==
Historical population
Census	Pop.	Note	%±
1910	264		—
1920	169		−36.0%
1930	177		4.7%
1940	179		1.1%
1950	130		−27.4%
1960	84		−35.4%
1970	94		11.9%
1980	135		43.6%
1990	68		−49.6%
2000	76		11.8%
2010	61		−19.7%
2020	63		3.3%
U.S. Decennial Census

=== 2020 census ===
As of the 2020 census, Mutual had a population of 63. The median age was 26.6 years. 33.3% of residents were under the age of 18 and 14.3% of residents were 65 years of age or older. For every 100 females there were 117.2 males, and for every 100 females age 18 and over there were 90.9 males age 18 and over.

0.0% of residents lived in urban areas, while 100.0% lived in rural areas.

There were 22 households in Mutual, of which 45.5% had children under the age of 18 living in them. Of all households, 54.5% were married-couple households, 4.5% were households with a male householder and no spouse or partner present, and 31.8% were households with a female householder and no spouse or partner present. About 22.7% of all households were made up of individuals and 4.5% had someone living alone who was 65 years of age or older.

There were 35 housing units, of which 37.1% were vacant. The homeowner vacancy rate was 12.5% and the rental vacancy rate was 0.0%.

Racial composition as of the 2020 census
Race	Number	Percent
White	51	81.0%
Black or African American	0	0.0%
American Indian and Alaska Native	4	6.3%
Asian	0	0.0%
Native Hawaiian and Other Pacific Islander	0	0.0%
Some other race	0	0.0%
Two or more races	8	12.7%
Hispanic or Latino (of any race)	4	6.3%

=== 2010 census ===
As of the 2010 census, there were 61 people, 28 households, and 17 families residing in the town. The population density was 231 inhabitants per square mile (89/km^{2}). There were 36 housing units at an average density of 136.4 per square mile (52.7/km^{2}).

There were 28 households, out of which 35.7% had children under the age of 18 living with them, 50% were married couples living together, 10.7% had a female householder with no husband present, and 39.3% were non-families. 39.3% of all households were made up of individuals, and 21.5% had someone living alone who was 65 years of age or older. The average household size was 2.18 and the average family size was 2.94.

In the town, the population was spread out, with 26.2% under the age of 18, 8.2% from 18 to 24, 27.9% from 25 to 44, 14.8% from 45 to 64, and 9.8% who were 65 years of age or older. The median age was 37.8 years. For every 100 females, there were 103.3 males. For every 100 females age 18 and over, there were 80.0 males.

The median income for a household in the town was $47,250, and the median income for a family was $49,472. The per capita income for the town was $24,408. None of the population was living below the poverty line.
