= Blayne Arthur =

American politician

- Arthur in 2026

Oklahoma Secretary of Agriculture
- Incumbent
- Assumed office December 2018
- Governor: Kevin Stitt
- Preceded by: Jim Reese

Blayne Arthur is an American rancher who has served as the Oklahoma Secretary of Agriculture since December 2018. She was selected as the president of the National Association of State Departments of Agriculture for 2023–2024.

== Early life and education ==
Arthur is the child of David Spencer, a rancher, and Dr. Peggy Clark, a USDA verinary medical officer. She is a native of Chickasha and was a 4-H member as a child. She is a graduate of Oklahoma State University.

== Career ==
Arthur worked for the Oklahoma Department of Agriculture for eight years and served as deputy commissioner for the department from 2012 to 2016. She later worked as the executive director Oklahoma 4-H Foundation.

Governor-elect Kevin Stitt appointed Arthur Secretary of Agriculture in December 2018, making her the first woman to hold the office. She had the support of the Oklahoma Farm Bureau. She was selected as the president of the National Association of State Departments of Agriculture for 2023–2024. Her family still operates an active ranch.
