= Vermont Agency of Agriculture Food and Markets =

U.S. state executive agency

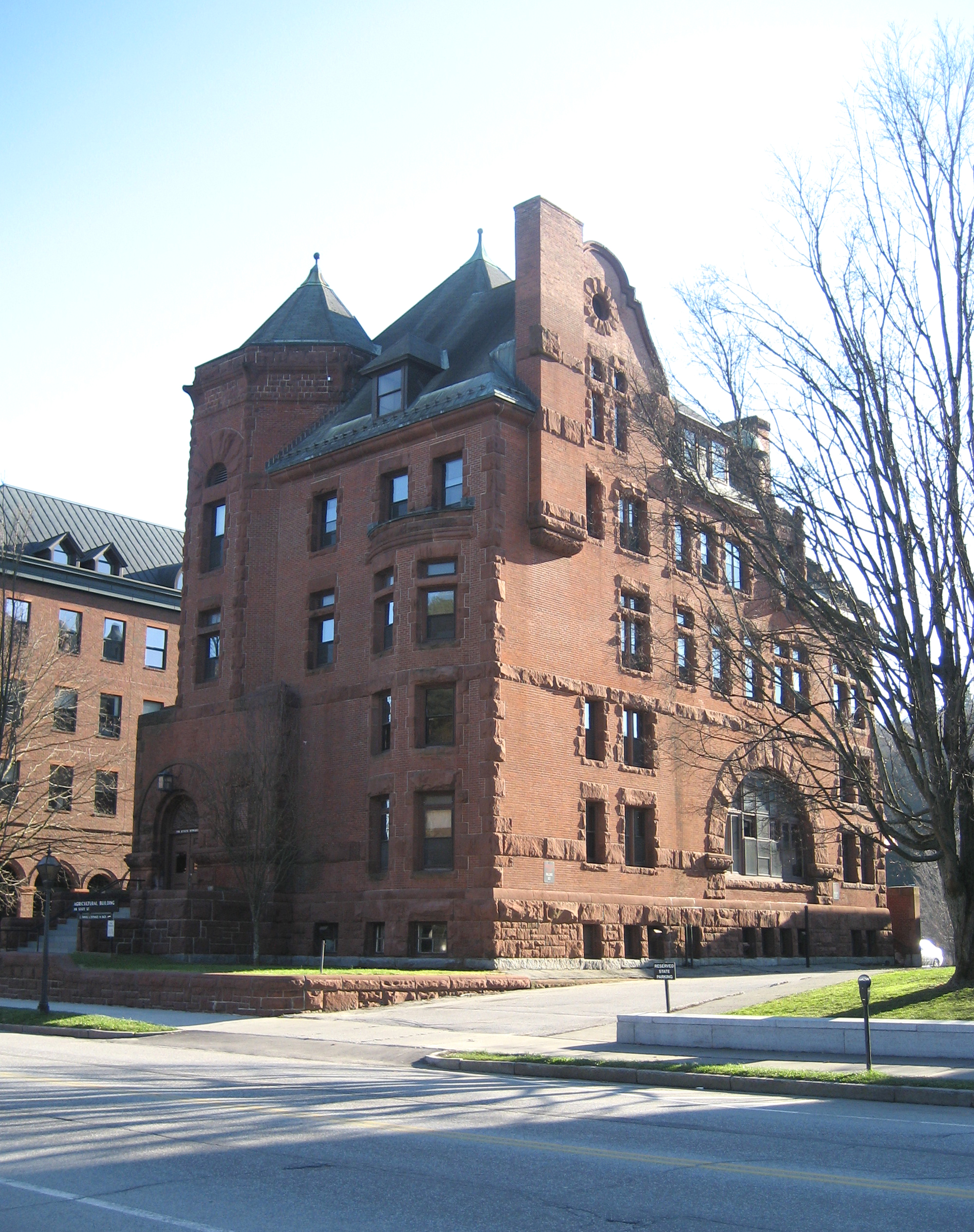
The Vermont Agency of Agriculture Food and Markets is housed in this Romanesque Revival building at 116 State Street in Montpelier.

The Vermont Agency of Agriculture Food and Markets (VAAFM) or sometimes colloquially the agriculture department, is a Vermont executive agency (or cabinet agency). Its purpose is to develop and execute policy on farming, agriculture, food, and promoting and protecting the Vermont brand as related to food in the worldwide market. It aims to meet the needs of dairy farmers, beekeepers, orchardists, maple sugarmakers, and related industries. The VAAFM promotes agricultural trade and production, work to assure food safety, protect natural resources, and preserve the culture of rural communities.

Anson Tebbetts of Cabot is the agency's current secretary.

== Divisions ==
The VAAFM is organized into four divisions:

- The Division of Administration oversees and coordinates agency policy and promotes interests of consumers and producers.
- The Division of Agricultural Development provides a role in developing local, regional, national and global markets for Vermont's agricultural products.
- The Division of Agricultural Resource Management and Environmental Stewardship works to regulates pesticides, feed, seed and fertilizers. The division administers Vermont's agricultural water quality programs and enforcement of environmental and safety laws.
- The Division of Food Safety and Consumer Protection is organized into the following sections providing oversight in the areas of: livestock heath, consumer safety and protection, dairy inspection, and meat inspection.

== Standards of quality ==
The Vermont Seal of Quality is allowed for Vermont grown agricultural products meeting agency standards and are subject to frequent agency inspection.

One role of the agency is the regulation and maintenance of quality. This goes hand in hand with the management of the Vermont brand as a reliable source of quality. While meeting all United States Department of Agriculture standards, Vermont exceeds those standards in the areas of dairy and maple products. Maple syrup produced in Vermont has a higher percentage of maple solids reflected in a higher weight per gallon than maple syrup from other U.S. states or Canada. The butterfat content of Vermont butter exceeds USDA minimums and equals those of the French Ministry of Agriculture and Fisheries, the highest standards set by a national government.

Vermont-grown and -produced agricultural products meeting the agency's standards may display the Vermont Seal of Quality in its packaging and promotion.

== History ==
In 2015, Act 64 required the agency to revise all Required Agricultural Practices to include small farms, nutrient storage (usually manure), soil health, buffer zones (from runoff areas), livestock exclusion, and nutrient management.
