= National Association of State Departments of Agriculture =

American organization

The National Association of State Department of Agriculture (NASDA) is an American organization of state departments of agriculture.

Founded in 1915, NASDA's mission is to represent the state departments of agriculture in the development, implementation, and communication of sound public policy and programs which support and promote the American agricultural industry, while protecting consumers and the environment.

The National Agricultural Law Center (NALC) and NASDA have formed a partnership.
