= Talkshow with Spike Feresten =

- 2009 title card
- Created by: Spike Feresten
- Presented by: Spike Feresten
- Theme music composer: G. Love & Special Sauce
- Country of origin: United States
- Original language: English
- No. of seasons: 3
- No. of episodes: 72 (5 unaired) (list of episodes)

Production
- Production location: California
- Running time: 30 minutes (2006–08); 60 minutes (2008–09)
- Production companies: Skyview Entertainment, in association with Fox Television Studios

Original release
- Network: Fox
- Release: September 16, 2006 – May 16, 2009

Talkshow with Spike Feresten is an American late-night talk show television program on Fox starring Spike Feresten that aired late Saturday nights from September 16, 2006, to May 16, 2009. It was the longest-running late night talk show in Fox's history, with three seasons.

== History ==
The show debuted on September 16, 2006 with guests Andy Richter and Arctic Monkeys. On May 7, 2007 the show was renewed for a second season, making it the longest-running talk show on Fox.

== See also ==
- List of late night network TV programs
