= Tommy Habeeb =

American television host

- Born: April 26, 1958 (age 68); Corpus Christi, Texas, U.S.
- Occupations: Television actor/host, television producer
- Years active: 1978–present

Thomas Louis Habeeb (born April 26, 1958), also known as Tommy Habeeb and Tommy Grand, is an American television host, best known for hosting the reality TV show Cheaters, as well as hosting uncensored pay-per-view specials of Cheaters on Events iN Demand. He was also host and executive producer of the reality show STAG: A Test of Love, which airs on Events iN Demand. Habeeb hosts the Golf special The Art of Golf Club Fitting. He currently hosts and executive produces the hit TV show To the Rescue.

== Career ==
Habeeb worked on films and television shows before rising to stardom on Cheaters, which made its debut in 1999.

Habeeb produced and hosted the first 84 episodes of Cheaters. In addition, Habeeb produced the television broadcast for a number of live sports programs: Art of War Undisputed Arena Fighting Championship for HDNET and Champs Boxing for Telefutura. Habeeb also produced An Eye for an Eye and the series The Big Big Show, which starred Andrew Dice Clay, Tara Reid, and Tom Green.

Habeeb co-hosted the SPCALA Telethon alongside Betty White.

== Trivia ==
- Habeeb's love for dog rescue inspired him to create a business called To The Rescue.
- Habeeb married Claudia Aenne Carson. He has three children with her named Richard, Alexander and Zachary.
- He is the brother of Linda Habeeb Smith, who played in the 1987 thriller Deathrow Gameshow.

== Filmography ==
=== Host ===
- To The Rescue (2020-2022)
- The Art of Golf Club Fitting (2019)
- Movies at the Statler (2018-2019)
- The Big Big Show (2015)
- Beer, Babes, and Movies
- Billionaires Car Club (2017)
- SPCALA Telethon
- Mrs World Pagent (2005)
- Eye for an Eye (2000–2002)
- Cheaters (2000–2002)
- SpeedZone (1996)
- Fast Pitch
- Generation Music
- Get Real w/Tommy
- Art of war

=== Producer ===
- The Big Big Show (2015)
- Beer, Babes & Movies (2009)
- Billionaires Car Club (2008)
- Art of War 3 (2007)
- Champs Boxing (2003)
- Cheaters (2000)
