= Oklahoma Secretary of Agriculture =

- Great Seal of Oklahoma

Agency overview
- Formed: June 6, 1986
- Headquarters: 2800 N. Lincoln Blvd; Oklahoma City, Oklahoma
- Employees: 577 (FY2011)
- Annual budget: $156 million (FY2011)
- Minister responsible: Blayne Arthur, Secretary of Agriculture
- Child agencies: Oklahoma Department of Agriculture, Food and Forestry; Oklahoma Conservation Commission
- Website: Office of the Secretary of Agriculture

The Oklahoma Secretary of Agriculture is a member of the Oklahoma Governor's Cabinet. The Secretary is appointed by the Governor, with the consent of the Oklahoma Senate, to serve at the pleasure of the Governor. The Secretary serves as the chief advisor to the Governor on agricultural, forestry and food issues

The 4th and current Secretary of Agriculture is Blayne Arthur, who was appointed by Governor Kevin Stitt on January 14, 2019

== History ==
The position of Secretary of Agriculture was established in 1986 to provide greater oversight and coordination to the agricultural activities of the State government. The position was established, along with the Oklahoma State Cabinet, by the Executive Branch Reform Act of 1986. The Act directed the Secretary of Agriculture to advise the Governor on agriculture policy and advise the state agricultural agencies on new policy as directed by the Governor.

== Dual position ==
Oklahoma state law allows for Cabinet Secretaries to serve concurrently as the head of a State agency in addition to their duties as a Cabinet Secretary. Historically, the Secretary of Agriculture has also served as the Commissioner of the Oklahoma Department of Agriculture, Food and Forestry. As of 2011, all Agriculture Secretaries have served in that dual position.

== Responsibilities ==
The Secretary of Agriculture is responsible for the regulation and promotion of the agricultural industry in Oklahoma. The Secretary oversees agricultural research, agricultural subsidies, prevention of plant diseases and invasive species prevention programs. The Secretary oversees the management of the forests of the State, including wildfire prevention and suppression. The office has oversight of food safety programs, consumer protection programs and rural development efforts. The Secretary also has responsibility for ensuring the conservation of the State's land and water for agricultural purposes.

As of fiscal year 2011, the Secretary of Agriculture oversees 577 full-time employees and is responsible for an annual budget of over $156 million.

== Agencies overseen ==
The Secretary of Agriculture oversees the following State agencies:

Agency	Employees	Budget (in millions)	Function
Department of Agriculture, Food, and Forestry	515	$87.8	Promotes agriculture, provides aid to farmers and ranchers, inspects food products and protects State forests
Conservation Commission	62	$68.2	Protects and conserves the State's soil and water agricultural resources

== List of past secretaries ==
#	Name	Took office	Left office	Governor served under
1	Gary Sherrer	1991	1995	David Walters
2	Dennis Howard	1995	2003	Frank Keating
3	Terry Peach	2003	2011	Brad Henry
4	Jim Reese	2011	2018	Mary Fallin
