= Oklahoma Farm Bureau =

The Oklahoma Farm Bureau (OKFB) is a nonprofit organization dedicated to promoting, protecting, and representing the interests of farmers and ranchers in Oklahoma and is the largest farm organization in the State. OKFB is the Oklahoma level partner of the American Farm Bureau Federation (AFBF).

== History ==
The Oklahoma Farm Bureau was originally organized in 1942 as an independent farm organization. It was chartered under the laws of the state of Oklahoma on February 3, 1942, under the State's Cooperative Marketing Association Act. OKFB affiliated with the American Farm Bureau Federation on March 1, 1942, when the first cooperative agreement was signed between the two organizations.

== Overview ==
The Oklahoma Farm Bureau is an independent, non-governmental, non-partisan voluntary organization of farmers and ranchers who associate to promote their common interests. Each of Oklahoma's 77 counties have their own County Farm Bureau. Each County level office is individually organized and chartered under the Oklahoma non-profit laws. Each of the organized county Farm Bureaus has a Board of Directors. Bylaws governing county Farm Bureaus will vary from county to county as each is a separate entity.

== Leadership ==
The Oklahoma Farm Bureau is governed by a ten-member Board of Directors. One Director serves from each of OKFB's nine districts, while the President serves at large. As of 2019, the directors are as follows:

- Rodd Moesel - President
- Gary Crawley - Vice President, District 5
- James Fuser - Secretary, District 6
- Monte Tucker - Treasurer, District 2
- Alan Jett - District 1 Director
- David VonTungeln - District 3 Director
- Jimmy Wayne Kinder - District 4 Director
- Keith KIsling - District 7 Director
- John Grundmann - District 8 Director
- Jim Meek - District 9 Director

== See also ==
- Arkansas Farm Bureau Federation
