= Jim Reese (Oklahoma politician) =

American politician

4th Oklahoma Secretary of Agriculture
- In office January 10, 2011 – December 2018
- Governor: Mary Fallin
- Preceded by: Terry Peach
- Succeeded by: Blayne Arthur

Commissioner of the Oklahoma Department of Agriculture
- Incumbent
- Assumed office January 10, 2011
- Governor: Mary Fallin
- Preceded by: Terry Peach

State Executive Director for Oklahoma Farm Service Agency
- In office 2001–2008
- President: George W. Bush
- Preceded by: Terry Peach
- Succeeded by: Francie Tolle

Oklahoma State Representatives
- In office 1987–2001
- Preceded by: Dorothy Conaghan
- Succeeded by: Dale DeWitt

Personal details
- Born: James Lee Reese c. 1957 Kay County, Oklahoma, USA
- Party: Republican
- Spouse: Margaret Lynn Lobmeyer Reese (married 1985)
- Children: Joanna, Drew, Lainey, and Spencer Reese
- Education: Northern Oklahoma College Oklahoma State University
- Occupation: Farmer, Businessman

James Lee Reese (born c. 1957) is a farmer, businessman and politician from the U.S. state of Oklahoma. Appointed by Republican Governor Mary Fallin as Oklahoma Secretary of Agriculture, Reese was sworn into office on January 10, 2011. He also acted as Fallin's chief advisor on policy development and implementation related to agriculture, food, and forestry. Reese serves concurrently in Oklahoma City as the commissioner of the Oklahoma Department of Agriculture.

== Biography ==
Reese graduated with an associate degree in drafting and design from the community college Northern Oklahoma College at Tonkawa in Kay County. He procured a Bachelor of Science degree in engineering technology from Oklahoma State University at Stillwater. Reese also attended the United States Department of Agriculture Supervisory Academy at Texas A&M University in College Station, Texas.

Reared on a wheat and dairy farm, Reese has maintained since 1978 his own farming enterprise at Nardin near Blackwell, Oklahoma. In 1986, he was elected to the Oklahoma House of Representatives, which he served from 1987 to 2001. Reese retired from the state legislature when he was selected to serve as the Oklahoma State Executive Director for the United States Department of Agriculture (USDA), Farm Service Agency under the administration of U.S. President George W. Bush. As executive director, Reese delivered federal agriculture programs to Oklahoma farmers and ranchers through more than 60 county offices across the state. Reese served in that position for eight years. In 2008, Oklahoma House Speaker Chris Benge selected and appointed him as his Policy Advisor to the Speaker of the House. Secretary Reese is a long-time agricultural and rural advocate and feels that Oklahoma agriculture is a vital part of Oklahoma's economy.

Reese has been married to Margaret Lynn Lobmeyer Reese since 1985 and has four children: Joanna (born 1986); Drew (born 1987); Lainey (born 1989); and Spencer (born 1992). Reese is an active member of these professional and civic organizations: Oklahoma Farm Bureau, Leadership Oklahoma Class IX/Board Member of Leadership Oklahoma, board chairman and member of Nardin First United Methodist Church, Oklahoma State Bureau of Investigation Citizens Academy. Reese has received the Oklahoma Farm Bureau Meritorious Service Award, Oklahoma Farmer's Union Outstanding Service Award, NFIB Small Business Award, George B. Schwabe Award for Outstanding Leadership, Oklahoma School Administrators Dedication Award and the Oklahoma State Troopers Award.

== Fallin administration ==
On November 15, 2010, newly elected Governor Mary Fallin announced the selection of Reese as her Secretary of Agriculture.

Reese was sworn in as the 4th Secretary of Agriculture on January 10, 2011, following Fallin's inauguration. Fallin also appointed Reese to serve concurrently as the Commissioner of the State Department of Agriculture.

Political offices
Preceded by Dorothy Conaghan	Oklahoma State Representative; 1987–2001	Succeeded by Dale DeWitt
Preceded by Terry Peach	State Executive Director of Oklahoma Farm Service Agency; Under President George W. Bush; 2001–2008	Succeeded by Francie Tolle
Preceded by Terry Peach	Oklahoma Secretary of Agriculture; Under Governor Mary Fallin; January 10, 2011–present	Incumbent
Preceded by Terry Peach	Commissioner of the Oklahoma Department of Agriculture; Under Governor Mary Fallin; January 10, 2011–present	Incumbent
