= Oklahoma Department of Agriculture, Food, and Forestry =

- Official logo of the Department

Agency overview
- Formed: November 16, 1907
- Headquarters: 2800 N. Lincoln Blvd Oklahoma City, Oklahoma
- Employees: 478 (FY2011)
- Annual budget: $87.7 million (FY2011)
- Minister responsible: Blayne Arthur, Secretary of Agriculture
- Agency executives: Blayne Arthur, Commissioner and President of the State Board of Agriculture; Betty Thompson, Deputy Commissioner
- Website: Oklahoma Department of Agriculture

The Oklahoma Department of Agriculture, Food, and Forestry is a department of the government of Oklahoma under the Oklahoma Secretary of Agriculture. It is responsible for providing services and expertise that promote and protect Oklahoma's food supply and natural resources while stimulating economic growth.

The department is governed by the State Board of Agriculture. The board consists of five members appointed by the governor of Oklahoma, with the approval of the Oklahoma Senate. The governor designates one of the members as president of the board, who serves as the commissioner of agriculture. The commissioner is responsible for overseeing the day-to-day operations and policies of the department.

The current commissioner of agriculture is Blayne Arthur, who was appointed by Governor Kevin Stitt in 2019.

The department was created in 1907 during the term of Governor Charles N. Haskell.

== Mission ==
The Agriculture Department protects and educates consumers about Oklahoma’s agricultural and livestock productions. Its purpose is to develop and execute policy on farming, agriculture, and food. It aims to meet the needs of farmers and ranchers, promote agricultural trade and production, work to assure food safety, protect natural resources, foster rural communities, also to meet the needs of Oklahomans.

== Leadership ==
The department is under the supervision of the Oklahoma Secretary of Agriculture. The State Board of Agriculture governs the department and is administered by the Commissioner of Agriculture (who is the President of the State Board of Agriculture). Under Governor Kevin Stitt, Blayne Arthur is serving concurrently as both Secretary and Commissioner.

== State Board of Agriculture ==
The governing body of the department is the State Board of Agriculture, which is composed of five members appointed by the Governor with the consent of the Oklahoma Senate. Members must be farmers with at least five years of practical experience in agriculture. The state is divided into four agricultural districts and a member is appointed to a four-year term from each of the districts. An at large position is appointed by the Governor to be the President of the State Board of Agriculture and serves at the pleasure of the Governor.

=== Board members ===
As of 2011, the following are the members of the State Board of Agriculture:

- Jim Reese, President of the Board
- Ed Hurliman, Broken Bow
- Jay Franklin, Vinita
- Britt Hilton, Gate
- Karen Krehbiel Dodson, Hydro

== Organization ==
- State Board of Agriculture
  - Commissioner of Agriculture
    - Assistant Commissioner
      - Associate Commissioner
        - Administration Division - executive office / agency services
          - Investigative Services Unit
        - Agricultural Environmental Management Services Division - protection of Oklahoma's waters and environment from animal and poultry waste
        - Agricultural Statistics Services Division - generates date on current crop conditions and livestock inventory numbers
        - Animal Industry Division - animal health and disease control programs
        - Consumer Protection Services Division - seed, feed, fertilizer, pesticides, nursery and weights & measures
        - Food Safety Division - meat, milk, egg, poultry and organic programs
        - Forestry Services Division - landowner assistance, tree planting, fire protection, urban forestry, and education programs
        - Laboratory Services Division - official state testing lab
        - Office of the General Counsel - enforcement of agricultural laws
        - Market Development Services Division - market promotion, loan programs, market news and educational programs
        - Wildlife Services Division - prevention of wildlife-caused damage

== Staffing ==
The Agriculture Department, with an annual budget of over $50 million, is one of the larger employers of the State. For fiscal year 2010, the Bureau was authorized 477 full-time employees.

Division	Number of Employees
Administration Division	54
Public Information Office	3
Legal Services Division	7
Agricultural Environmental Services Division	14
Statistic Reporting Services Division	3
Forestry Services Division	161
Animal Industry Division	32
Market Development Division	19
Consumer Services Division	58
Wildlife Services Division	19
Food Safety Division	67
Agricultural Laboratory Services	41
Total	478

== Budget ==
The Agriculture Department has an annual budget of almost $90 million. Each of the department's operating units how the following operating budget:

Program	Funding (in millions)
Administration Services	$18.2
Legal Services	$0.8
Agricultural Environmental Services	$2.7
Forestry Services	$14.9
Animal Industry Services	$4.2
Market Development Services	$5.9
Consumer Protection Services	$7.2
Wildlife Services	$2.8
Food Safety Services	$4.7
Agricultural Laboratory Services	$4.1
Agriculture Programs	$22.2
Total	$87.7

== Supporting agencies ==
=== Boll Weevil Eradication Organization ===
The purpose of the Oklahoma Boll Weevil Eradication Organization is to assist cotton growers in the State in the eradication of the boll weevil. The OBWEO is funded by assessments made against cotton producers. The board that controls the OBWEO is composed of five members, who are each elected from the cotton producers of their respective districts. The OBWEO has annual budget of just under $1 million and employs 14 people (for fiscal year 2011).

=== Peanut Commission ===
The Oklahoma Peanut Commission was established in 1965 to promote and encourage the production and sale of peanuts and related products. The Commission engages in research designed to strengthen the peanut market by developing new production methods and uses for peanuts. The Commission is composed of six members, each appointed by the Governor without the approval of the Senate. The Commission has annual budget of just under $200,000 and employs two people.

=== Wheat Commission ===
The Oklahoma Wheat Commission was established to develop and expand domestic and international markets for Oklahoma's wheat producers. The Commission is composed of five members appointed by the Governor without the approval of the Senate. The Commission is responsible for researching new wheat production techniques, provides educational material, and works to expand the wheat market. The Commission has an annual budget of over $1.5 million and employs six people.
