= Oklahoma Secretary of Energy =

Oklahoma state cabinet-level position

- Great Seal of Oklahoma

Agency overview
- Formed: June 6, 1986
- Dissolved: July 2013
- Headquarters: 100 North Broadway; Oklahoma City, Oklahoma
- Employees: 969 (FY2011)
- Annual budget: $641 million (FY2011)
- Child agencies: Oklahoma Corporation Commission; Oklahoma Department of Mines; Oklahoma Energy Resources Board
- Website: Office of the Secretary of Energy

The Oklahoma Secretary of Energy was a position in the Oklahoma Governor's Cabinet. The secretary was appointed by the governor of Oklahoma, with the consent of the Oklahoma Senate, to serve at the pleasure of the governor. The secretary served as the chief advisor to the governor on energy policy development and implementation.

In 2013, then-Governor Mary Fallin abolished the position, merging it into the Office of the Secretary of Energy and Environment. The last secretary was Mike Ming, who was appointed on January 10, 2011. Oklahoma's incumbent Secretary of Energy and Environment is Jeff Starling.

== History ==
The Office of the Secretary of the Environment was established in 1986 to provide greater oversight and coordination to the energy activities of the state government. The office was established, along with the Oklahoma State Cabinet, by the Executive Branch Reform Act of 1986. The act directed the secretary of energy to advise the governor on energy policy and advise the state energy agencies on new policy as directed by the governor.

Oklahoma state law allows for cabinet secretaries to serve concurrently as the head of a state agency in addition to their duties as a cabinet secretary. Historically, the secretary of energy has not served in any such dual position.

The offices of the Office of the Secretary of Energy and the Office of the Secretary of the Environment were merged in 2013, creating the Office of the Secretary of Energy and Environment.

== Responsibilities ==
The secretary of energy served as the principal state government entity that is responsible for regulating and promoting the existing energy industry in the State. The secretary was responsible for overseeing energy conservation, energy-related research, energy production, and alternative and renewable energy development. The energy secretary was also one of three cabinet secretaries that served on the Executive Environmental Committee of the Governor's Cabinet, along with the Oklahoma Secretary of Agriculture and the Oklahoma Secretary of the Environment.

The secretary served ex officio as the governor's representative on the Interstate Oil and Gas Compact Commission. As the governor's official representative, the secretary represented the state on the commission and advocated for the conservation of oil and gas resources.

As of fiscal year 2011, the secretary of energy oversaw 969 full-time employees and was responsible for an annual budget of over $641 million.

== Office of the Secretary ==
The secretary headed the Office of the Secretary of Energy, which was a state agency.

=== Mission and goals ===
The mission statement of the office was:

The goals of the Oklahoma Secretary of Energy are to support current energy industries, facilitate the development of alternative and renewable energies, and to foster the growth and economic development of the state through strategic diversity.

The stated goals of the office were:

- Prioritize the use of Oklahoma Resources when developing plans to meet the State's energy needs for transportation fuels and power generation
- Support Oklahoma's existing oil and natural gas industry
- Ensure stability and supply of electricity at a reasonable cost to Oklahoma homes and businesses through ample electricity generation and a robust transmission grid
- Increase research, development and demonstration projects for biofuels to complement petroleum for transportation fuels and for alternative energy including wind, hydro and solar to generate electricity
- Help Oklahomans understand the need for conservation and help reduce consumption and manage demand

=== Staff ===
The staff of the office served as the immediate staff to the secretary. The office had a very limited staff of three full-time employees including the secretary. As of 2010, the following were the authorized positions within the office:

- Secretary of Energy
- Deputy Secretary of Energy
- Special Assistant and Legislative Liaison

=== Budget ===
For fiscal year 2011, with three employees, the office has an annual budget of just under $1 million. All of that budget was dedicated to employee compensation and operating expenses.

=== Salary ===
The annual salary of the secretary of energy was set by law at $70,000. Despite this law, if the secretary served as the head of a state agency, the secretary receives the higher of the two salaries. Because the secretary of energy also served as the governor's representative to the Interstate Oil and Gas Compact Commission, they received the salary allocated for that position; in 2010, the annual salary of that position was set at $90,000.

== Agencies overseen ==
The secretary of energy oversaw the following state entities:

- Oklahoma Corporation Commission
- Oklahoma Department of Mines
- Oklahoma Energy Resources Board
- Oklahoma Marginal Wells Commission
- Oklahoma Bioenergy Center
- Clean Energy Independence Commission

The secretary was also responsible for representing the governor before the following entities:

- Southwest Power Pool
- Interstate Oil and Gas Compact Commission
- Western Governors' Association
- Grand River Dam Authority

== List of secretaries ==
#	Name	Took office	Left office	Governor served under
1	Charles R. Nesbitt	1991	1995	David Walters
2	Carl Michael Smith	1995	2002	Frank Keating
3	Robert J. Sullivan, Jr.	2002	2003	Frank Keating
4	David Fleischaker	2003	2008	Brad Henry
5	Bobby Wegener	2008	2011	Brad Henry
6	Mike Ming	2011	2013	Mary Fallin
Position merged into Secretary of Energy and Environment
7	Michael Teague	2013	2019	Mary Fallin
8	Kenneth Wagner	2019	2022	Kevin Stitt
9	Ken McQueen	2022	2024	Kevin Stitt
10	Jeff Starling	2024	present	Kevin Stitt

== See also ==
- United States Department of Energy
- Oklahoma Secretary of the Environment
