= Carl Michael Smith =

American businessman, energy expert, and politician

Executive Director of the Interstate Oil and Gas Compact Commission
- Incumbent
- Assumed office 2008

Assistant Secretary of Energy for Fossil Energy
- In office 2002–2004
- President: George W. Bush
- Preceded by: Robert W. Gee
- Succeeded by: Jeffrey D. Jarrett

Oklahoma Secretary of Energy
- In office 1995–2002
- Governor: Frank Keating
- Preceded by: Charles R. Nesbitt
- Succeeded by: Robert J. Sullivan Jr.

Personal details
- Born: 1944 (age 81–82)
- Education: University of Oklahoma; OU Law

Carl Michael "Mike" Smith (born 1944) is an American businessman, energy expert, and politician from Oklahoma. Smith is currently serving as the executive director of the Interstate Oil and Gas Compact Commission. Smith has served in numerous energy policy positions for both the United States federal and Oklahoma state governments, including Assistant Secretary of Energy for Fossil Energy under President George W. Bush (2002–2004) and Oklahoma Secretary of Energy under Governor of Oklahoma Frank Keating (1995–2002).

== Education and early career ==
Smith earned his bachelor's degree in 1966 from the University of Oklahoma and received his Juris Doctor in 1969 from the OU College of Law, where he focused on oil and gas law. After graduating from OU, Smith began a partner with Lawrence, Smith and Harmon. The later left that firm to become President of Red Rock Exploration, Inc., an Oklahoma City based oil and gas exploration company with operations in central and western Oklahoma. While with Red Rock, Smith was elected to the Board of Director of the Oklahoma Independent Petroleum Association in 1981, a position he would hold until 1995. In 1983, Smith became a partner with the Oklahoma law firm of Lawrence and Ellis. Smith was elected President of the Oklahoma Independent Petroleum Association in 1994.

Smith was appointed to the Oklahoma Energy Resources Board, a state board that conducts environmental restoration of orphaned and abandoned well sites, encourages the wise and efficient use of energy, and promotes energy education, and was, in 1994, elected that Board's Secretary.

== Keating administration ==
When Republican Frank Keating was elected Governor of Oklahoma in 1994, Keating asked Smith to join his administration as his Secretary of Energy in Governor Keating's Cabinet. As Energy Secretary, Smith was responsible for developing fossil energy policy for the State as well as providing oversight to the State's energy agencies, including the Oklahoma Corporation Commission, the Oklahoma Department of Mines, and the Oklahoma Energy Resources Board. Additionally, Secretary Smith served as Governor Keating's official representative to the Interstate Oil and Gas Compact Commission, the Southern States Energy Board, the Interstate Mining Compact Commission and the Governors’ Ethanol Coalition.

Smith remained as Keating's Energy Secretary until 2002 when he resigned to join the George W. Bush administration. Keating appointed Robert J. Sullivan Jr., a Tulsa businessman, to succeed Smith as Secretary.

== Bush administration ==
In 2002, President George W. Bush appointed Smith to serve as his Assistant Secretary of Energy for Fossil Energy within the United States Department of Energy. As Assistant Secretary, Smith served as the primary policy advisor to United States Secretary of Energy Spencer Abraham on federal coal, petroleum, and natural gas programs. Smith oversaw nearly 1,000 scientists, engineers, technicians and administrative staff in two national laboratories, four field offices and at DOE's headquarters in Washington, D.C.

He was responsible for several high-priority presidential initiatives, including the implementation of the Bush administration's $2 billion development of a new generation of environmentally sound clean coal technologies and the $1 billion FutureGen project. His duties also included managing the nation's Strategic Petroleum Reserve and the Northeast Home Heating Oil Reserve.

== Return to private sector ==
Smith resigned as assistant secretary in 2004 to return to Oklahoma. He joined Dunlap Codding & Rogers, one of Oklahoma's oldest and largest dedicated intellectual property law firms.

== IOGCC ==
The Interstate Oil and Gas Compact Commission, an interstate compact of 30 US States that works to promote the conservation and efficient recovery of the nation's domestic oil and natural gas resources, appointed Smith as their executive director in March 2008.

Political offices
| Preceded by Charles R. Nesbitt | Oklahoma Secretary of Energy; Under Governor Frank Keating; 1995–2002 | Succeeded by Robert J. Sullivan Jr. |
| Preceded by Robert W. Gee | Assistant Secretary of Energy for Fossil Energy; Under President George W. Bush; 2002–2004 | Succeeded by Jeffrey D. Jarrett |
| Preceded by | Executive Director of the Interstate Oil and Gas Compact Commission; April 2008–present | Incumbent |
