= Brian C. Griffin =

American businessman

Oklahoma Secretary of the Environment
- In office January 1997 – January 2003
- Governor: Frank Keating
- Preceded by: Gary Sherrer
- Succeeded by: Miles Tolbert

Chair of the Administrative Conference of the United States
- In office 1992–1993
- President: George H. W. Bush
- Preceded by: Marshall J. Breger
- Succeeded by: Thomasina V. Rogers

Personal details
- Born: 1953 (age 72–73) Oklahoma
- Party: Republican
- Education: Harvard University; Oxford University
- Occupation: Lawyer

Brian C. Griffin (born 1953) is an American businessman from Oklahoma who currently serves as the Chairman of the Board of Directors for Clean Energy Systems, a private Rancho Cordova, California-based energy technology innovations firm.

Griffin had previously served as the Oklahoma Secretary of the Environment under former governor of Oklahoma Frank Keating from 1997 to 2003.

== Education and early career ==
Griffin received his undergraduate degree from Harvard University in 1974 and was selected as a Rhodes Scholar. As a Rhodes Scholar, he attended Oxford University, where he received his British law degree. He also holds an American Juris Doctor degree. Griffin began his law practice in tax law as well as oil and gas law. Governor of Oklahoma George Nigh appointed Griffin to serve as Oklahoma's representative on the Interstate Oil and Gas Compact Commission. In 1986, he was the Republican nominee for Attorney General of Oklahoma. He lost that election to Democratic nominee Robert Harlan Henry.

Griffin served in the George H. W. Bush administration as a Deputy Assistant Attorney General in the United States Department of Justice Tax Division. In 1992, he was appointed to chair the Administrative Conference of the United States. Griffin also served as Senior Fellow of the conference in 1993-1995. While with the Department of Justice, some of Griffin's duties included working with the U.S. Environmental Protection Agency.

After leaving the federal government, Griffin founded The Griffin Companies, a real estate development holding company, which he served as president of until 1997.

== Secretary of the Environment ==
In 1997, following the resignation of Gary Sherrer, Governor of Oklahoma Frank Keating appointed Griffin to serve as his second Secretary of the Environment. Griffin would remain in that position until the end of Governor Keating's term as governor in 2003.

As Environmental Secretary, Griffin oversaw the Oklahoma Department of Environmental Quality, the Oklahoma Water Resources Board, and the Oklahoma Department of Wildlife Conservation.

Griffin served as chairman of the Tar Creek Superfund Task Force that was appointed by Governor Keating in January 2000 to examine issues that still remained to clean up the site in Ottawa County, Oklahoma. The committee was charged with presenting its list of recommendations to the governor by the following October 1.

== Return to private sector ==
In January 2004, Griffin was appointed the president and member of the board for Clean Energy Systems, a private Rancho Cordova, California based energy technology innovations firm. Griffin would later be elected chair of the board of directors of that firm.

Political offices
Preceded by Gary Sherrer	Oklahoma Secretary of the Environment; Under Governor Frank Keating; 1997–2003	Succeeded by Miles Tolbert
Party political offices
Preceded by	Republican nominee for Attorney General of Oklahoma; 1986	Succeeded by
