= Senator Easley =

Senator Easley may refer to:

- Kevin Easley (born 1960), Oklahoma State Senate
- Mack Easley (1916–2006), New Mexico State Senate
- Mary L. Easley (fl. 2000s–2010s), Oklahoma State Senate
