= J.D. Strong =

American politician (born 1971)

Executive Director of the Oklahoma Water Resources Board
- Incumbent
- Assumed office October 12, 2010
- Governor: Brad Henry; Mary Fallin
- Preceded by: Duane Smith

Oklahoma Secretary of the Environment
- In office August 20, 2008 – January 14, 2011
- Governor: Brad Henry
- Preceded by: Miles Tolbert
- Succeeded by: Gary Sherrer

Personal details
- Born: April 16, 1971 (age 55) Weatherford, Oklahoma
- Spouse: Kalli
- Children: Edyn
- Website: Oklahoma Water Resources Board

J.D. Strong (born 1971) is a civil servant from the U.S. state of Oklahoma and the current executive director of the Oklahoma Water Resources Board (OWRB).

Strong has served three governors of Oklahoma in various capacities since 1996: Republican Frank Keating, Democrat Brad Henry, and Republican Mary Fallin. Under the Henry Administration, Strong served as Henry's Secretary of the Environment. As Secretary, Strong oversaw also environmental protection and wildlife conservation programs of the State.

== Education and early career ==
A fifth generation Oklahoman, Strong graduated as valedictorian from Weatherford High School in Weatherford, Oklahoma. He earned a bachelor's degree from Oklahoma State University in Wildlife Ecology with a minor in Agronomy in 1993. While finishing his degree at OSU, Strong began working at the Oklahoma Water Resources Board, where he worked as an environmental scientist for several years. In 1996, Strong was appointed a special assistant to the Secretary of the Environment.

In his twelve years at the Office of the Secretary of the Environment, Strong served as the lead advisor to three different Environmental Secretaries for two Governors. In this capacity, he coordinated both the Governor's Tar Creek Superfund Task Force and the Governor's Animal Waste and Water Quality Protection Task Force under then Governor Frank Keating. Strong was also actively involved in efforts to address interstate water pollution concerns, particularly regarding excess phosphorus pollution in watersheds shared with the state of Arkansas. Strong has worked with northern Ottawa County officials on a massive buyout assistance program to relocate families and businesses from the nation's most hazardous Superfund Site—the Tar Creek Superfund Site in Picher, Oklahoma.

Prior to his serving as Environmental Secretary, Strong served as the Office of the Secretary of the Environment's chief liaison to the Oklahoma Legislature before becoming the chief of staff to former Secretary of the Environment Miles Tolbert in 2003.

== Secretary of the Environment ==
Strong was appointed by Governor of Oklahoma Brad Henry as his second Secretary of the Environment. Strong succeed Miles Tolbert, who resigned to take a position in the private sector. In addition to serving as Governor Henry's lead advisor on environmental matters, Strong coordinated the activities of the Environmental Subcabinet, as well as oversaw the Oklahoma Department of Environmental Quality, the Oklahoma Water Resources Board, and the Oklahoma Department of Wildlife Conservation.

== Executive director of the Oklahoma Water Resources Board ==
Strong was appointed by the Oklahoma Water Resources Board as its executive director in October 2010 while serving as Secretary of the Environment. Upon the election of Republican governor Mary Fallin, Strong was replaced as secretary by Fallin appointee Gary Sherrer. Strong retained his position as OWRB executive director, however, despite the election of a new governor.

Under Strong's leadership, the OWRB updated the Oklahoma Comprehensive Water Plan, a 50-year water supply assessment and policy strategy to meet Oklahoma's future water needs. Strong also oversees administration of Oklahoma's AAA-rated $3 billion Financial Assistance Program, which assists more than two-thirds of Oklahoma communities and rural water districts in financing water infrastructure projects. Other significant programs under Strong's direction include the administration of almost 13,000 water rights permits allocating some 6 million acre-feet of stream and groundwater, hydrologic studies, licensure of water well drillers, floodplain management, dam safety, and a water quality management program that includes establishment of standards and statewide monitoring of lakes and streams. Strong represents Oklahoma on the Western States Water Council and Chairs its Water Quality Committee, and also serves as Oklahoma's Commissioner on four congressionally approved interstate water Compact Commissions.

== Personal life ==
Strong, his wife, Kalli, and their daughter, Edyn, live in southwest Oklahoma City where they are active in the Yukon, Oklahoma, public school system, their neighborhood association, their daughter's pom squad, and their local church.

Political offices
Preceded by Miles Tolbert	Oklahoma Secretary of the Environment; Under Governor Brad Henry; August 20, 2008 - January 14, 2011	Succeeded by Gary Sherrer
