= Miles Tolbert =

American lawyer

Oklahoma Secretary of the Environment
- In office January 2003 – August 2008
- Governor: Brad Henry
- Preceded by: Brian C. Griffin
- Succeeded by: J.D. Strong

Personal details
- Occupation: Lawyer

Miles Tolbert is an American lawyer from the state of Oklahoma who served as the Oklahoma Secretary of the Environment in the Cabinet of Governor Brad Henry. Tolbert was appointed by Henry in 2003 and served until his resignation in 2008. Tolbert was succeeded by J.D. Strong, Tolbert's chief of staff, as Secretary.

== Early career ==
Tolbert joined the Office of the Oklahoma Attorney General as an attorney to eventually become the chief of the Environmental Protection Unit. He has also practiced law in Washington, D.C., as an attorney for the Environmental and Natural Resources Division of the United States Department of Justice. At the time of his appointment in 2003, Tolbert was the president-elect of the Oklahoma Bar Association's environmental law section and a member of the Crowe & Dunlevy, an Oklahoma City-based law firm.

== Secretary of the Environment ==
On January 10, 2003, Governor of Oklahoma-elect Brad Henry announced that he would appoint Tolbert to serve as his Secretary of the Environment. As the Secretary, Tolbert was charged with the protection and enhancement of Oklahoma's environment and natural resources through preservation, conservation, restoration, education and enforcement in order to maintain and improve the environmental quality and natural beauty of our state and better the standard of living for all Oklahomans. He had supervision over the Oklahoma Department of Environmental Quality, the Oklahoma Department of Wildlife Conservation and the Oklahoma Water Resources Board.

In August, 2008, Tolbert resigned as Secretary in order to return to private practice. Governor Henry appointed J.D. Strong, longtime staffer in the Office of the Secretary and Tolbert's then chief of staff, to serve as Tolbert's successor.

Political offices
| Preceded by Brian C. Griffin | Oklahoma Secretary of the Environment; Under Governor Brad Henry; January, 2003 - August, 2008 | Succeeded by J.D. Strong |
