= David Fleischaker =

American businessman and lawyer

Oklahoma Secretary of Energy
- In office October 9, 2003 – December 18, 2008
- Governor: Brad Henry
- Preceded by: Robert J. Sullivan, Jr.
- Succeeded by: Bobby Wegener

Personal details
- Born: 1944 (age 81–82)
- Education: Brandeis University; University of Texas
- Occupation: Lawyer

David Fleischaker (born 1944) is an American businessman and lawyer who served as the Oklahoma Secretary of Energy under Governor of Oklahoma Brad Henry from 2003 to 2008. Fleischaker has served as the President and CEO of Jolen Operating Company, a privately held independent oil and gas exploration and production company, since 1982.

== Early career ==
Fleischaker received his BA in 1966 from Brandeis University and his LLM in 1971 from the University of Texas. Fleischaker served as a member of the United States Air Force Reserve.

Fleischaker began his career in 1973 as a trial attorney for the Civil Rights Division of the United States Department of Justice. He entered private practice in 1974 in Washington D.C. representing national environmental groups and local governments in environmental litigation and regulatory proceedings. While in Washington, he also became an advisor to the Federal Energy Administration (which later become the United States Department of Energy) during 1974. In 1981 he returned to his home state, where he entered his family's oil and gas company by becoming the president and CEO of Jolen Operating Company.

== Secretary of Energy ==
In October 2003, Governor of Oklahoma Brad Henry appointed Fleischaker as his Secretary of Energy. Fleischaker has focused his office on developing renewable and sustainable energy resources for the state, including establishing the Oklahoma Bioenergy Center to promote the development of a biofuels industry in Oklahoma, the development and expansion of wind power and the promotion of demand side management policies at the state energy regulatory agencies. As Secretary, Fleischaker had supervision of the Oklahoma Corporation Commission, the Oklahoma Energy Resources Board, the Grand River Dam Authority and the Oklahoma Department of Mines, among others.

In December 2008, Fleischaker resigned as Secretary to return to the private sector where he serves as president and chief executive officer of Jolen Operating Company.

Fleischaker has written and lectured extensively on energy policy with articles appearing in USA Today, the Washington Post, the Los Angeles Times and the Daily Oklahoman, and has presented opinion pieces on National Public Radio. He is a member of the board of directors of the Santa Fe Conservation Trust.

== Service to other civic organizations ==
- Board of Trustees, Oklahoma City University;
- Board of Trustees, the National Conference of Christians and Jews;
- Board of Trustees, Jewish Federation of Greater Oklahoma City;
- Board of Trustees, Ballet Oklahoma;
- Board of Trustees, Oklahoma Independent Petroleum Association.

== Personal life ==
Fleischaker's wife Pam, is a noted journalist and author. They have a son, Joey, and daughter, Emily. His parents, Richard H. Fleischaker and Adeline J. Fleischaker, were noted for their philanthropy in the Oklahoma community and the national Jewish community.

Political offices
Preceded by Robert J. Sullivan, Jr.	Oklahoma Secretary of Energy; Under Governor Brad Henry; October 9, 2003 – December 18, 2008	Succeeded by Bobby Wegener
