= Sustaining Oklahoma's Energy Resources =

- Great Seal of Oklahoma

Agency overview
- Formed: October 1, 1992
- Dissolved: July 1, 2013
- Headquarters: 421 N.W. 13th Oklahoma City, Oklahoma
- Employees: 4 (FY2011)
- Annual budget: $700,000 (FY2011)
- Minister responsible: Bobby Wegener, Secretary of Energy
- Agency executive: James Revard, Executive Director
- Website: soerok.com

Sustaining Oklahoma's Energy Resources (SOER), formerly known as the Oklahoma Commission on Marginally Producing Oil and Gas Well, and formerly commonly known as the Oklahoma Marginal Wells Commission (MWC), is a committee under the authority of the Oklahoma Energy Resources Board (OERB). The committee is responsible for identifying and evaluating the economic and operational factors of marginally producing oil and gas wells. The committee is also responsible for assuring that appropriate measures are taken to extend the usefulness of those wells so identified.

The committee is composed of nine members, who are all either independent and major oil and gas operators and royalty owners. The members are appointed by the governor of Oklahoma, with the consent of the Oklahoma Senate. Each member serves a fixed three-year term. It is the duty of the committee to appoint an executive director to oversee the day-to-day operations and programs under the jurisdiction of the committee. The current executive director is James Revard.

The committee's predecessor, the MWC, was established on 1st October 1992, during the term of Governor David Walters. On July 1, 2013, it was dissolved and its responsibilities transferred to the Committee for Sustaining Oklahoma's Energy Resources under the authority of the Oklahoma Energy Resources Board.

== Duties ==
The duties of the agency are to research and collect data characterizing marginal wells; to propose legislative, regulatory, and operation remedies; to educate the public on the contributions of marginal wells; and, to interact with regional organizations to ensure recognition of the importance of marginally producing oil and gas wells to the current and future domestic production of oil and gas.

== Commissioners ==
In 2010, the Commission members were:

- David Moore – Secretary
- David Guest – Chairman
- A. Hearne Williford
- Paul L. Bruce
- Charles B. "Chuck" Davis
- Thomas F. Dunlap
- Bill Gifford
- Stan B. Noble – Vice Chairman
- Ken Kerrihand

== Budget ==
When it was a commission, the annual budget was not supported by yearly appropriations by the Oklahoma Legislature. As such, no tax revenue supported the commission. Rather, the legislature, when they created the commission, established a voluntary Marginal Wells Fee. Any oil or gas company may submit the fee to the Oklahoma Tax Commission to support the work of the commission.
