= 2006 Oklahoma gubernatorial election =

- November 7, 2006
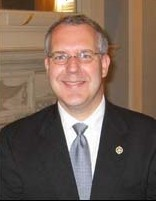

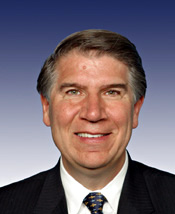
Nominee	Brad Henry	Ernest Istook
Party	Democratic	Republican
Popular vote	616,135	310,327
Percentage	66.50%	33.50%
- Henry: 50–60% 60–70% 70–80% 80–90% >90% Istook: 50–60% 60–70% 70–80% 80–90% Tie: 50% No votes
Governor before election
Brad Henry
Democratic
Elected Governor
Brad Henry
Democratic

The 2006 Oklahoma gubernatorial election was held on November 7, 2006. Incumbent Democratic governor Brad Henry won re-election to a second term in a landslide, defeating Republican U.S. representative Ernest Istook. Henry took 66.5% of the vote to Istook's 33.5% and swept all but three counties in the state.

As of 2026, this remains the last time that a Democrat was elected Governor of Oklahoma, or along with the concurrent elections, won any statewide office. Republicans later swept all statewide offices on the 2010 ballot, and have held majorities in both state legislative chambers since the 2008 election.

== Background ==
Though Democrats had dominated state politics for most of Oklahoma's history, the Oklahoma Republican Party had recently gained control of the Oklahoma House of Representatives and held five of the state's six Congressional seats. Henry's opponent, Republican Ernest Istook, was a member of the United States House of Representatives, representing Oklahoma's 5th congressional district.

As in many Southern states, Oklahoma has favored conservative Democrats to the more liberal members of the party. In his first term, Henry had supported some tax cuts and took centrist positions on many political hot button issues.

== Democratic primary ==
=== Candidates ===
- Brad Henry, incumbent governor of Oklahoma
- Andrew W. Marr, Jr.

=== Results ===
Democratic primary results
Party	Candidate	Votes	%
Democratic	Brad Henry (incumbent)	226,957	85.82
Democratic	Andrew W. Marr, Jr.	37,510	14.18
Total votes		264,467	100.00

== Republican primary ==
=== Candidates ===
- Ernest Istook, U.S. congressman
- Bob Sullivan, former Oklahoma Secretary of Energy
- James A. Williamson, Oklahoma state senator
- Jim Evanoff

=== Campaign ===
Istook's strongest opponent in the primary was Bob Sullivan, who positioned himself as the only "non-career politician" in the race. He ran ads featuring Gailard Sartain that attacked his opponents' "career politician" background. The Sartain ads were seen as over the top and may have hurt his chances. Sullivan said education was a top priority and had led an effort to place an initiative petition on the November 2006 ballot that would have required 65 percent of money earmarked for education be spent in the classroom.

=== Results ===
Results by county Map legend: Istook—70–80%; Istook—60–70%; Istook—50–60%; Istook—40–50%; Istook—30–40%; Istook/Sullivan tie—30–40%; Sullivan—30–40%; Sullivan—40–50%

Republican primary results
Party	Candidate	Votes	%
Republican	Ernest Istook	99,650	54.71
Republican	Bob Sullivan	56,347	30.94
Republican	James Allen Williamson	17,769	9.76
Republican	Jim Evanoff	8,370	4.60
Total votes		182,136	100.00

== General election ==
The incumbent Democratic governor Brad Henry won the election with more than 66 percent of the vote, beating Republican U.S. representative Ernest Istook.

=== Predictions ===
Source	Ranking	As of
The Cook Political Report	Solid D	November 6, 2006
Sabato's Crystal Ball	Safe D	November 6, 2006
Rothenberg Political Report	Safe D	November 2, 2006
Real Clear Politics	Safe D	November 6, 2006

=== Polling ===
Source	Date	Brad Henry (D)	Ernest Istook (R)
Survey USA	November 4, 2006	65%	29%
Rasmussen	September 29, 2006	59%	34%
Survey USA	September 26, 2006	64%	33%
Rasmussen	September 6, 2006	54%	33%
Survey USA	August 28, 2006	60%	34%
Sooner Poll	July 17, 2006	57%	29%
Rasmussen	May 7, 2006	50%	39%

=== Results ===
2006 Oklahoma gubernatorial election
Party	Candidate	Votes	%	±%
Democratic	Brad Henry (incumbent)	616,135	66.50%	+23.23%
Republican	Ernest Istook	310,327	33.50%	–9.11%
Total votes		926,462	100.00%	
Majority		305,808	33.01%	
Democratic hold		Swing	+32.35%	

=== Results by county ===
County	Brad Henry Democratic		Ernest Istook Republican		Margin		Total votes cast
County	#	%	#	%	#	%	Total votes cast
Adair	3,253	67.52%	1,565	32.48%	1,688	35.04%	4,818
Alfalfa	1,389	67.04%	683	32.96%	706	34.07%	2,072
Atoka	2,372	74.64%	806	25.36%	1,566	49.28%	3,178
Beaver	857	46.40%	990	53.60%	-133	-7.20%	1,847
Beckham	3,423	71.06%	1,394	28.94%	2,029	42.12%	4,817
Blaine	2,192	69.52%	961	30.48%	1,231	39.04%	3,153
Bryan	6,310	79.06%	1,671	20.94%	4,639	58.13%	7,981
Caddo	4,990	74.12%	1,742	25.88%	3,248	48.25%	6,732
Canadian	16,188	58.33%	11,565	41.67%	4,623	16.66%	27,753
Carter	7,348	70.79%	3,032	29.21%	4,316	41.58%	10,380
Cherokee	7,903	76.01%	2,495	23.99%	5,408	52.01%	10,398
Choctaw	3,139	81.68%	704	18.32%	2,435	63.36%	3,843
Cimarron	353	33.36%	705	66.64%	-352	-33.27%	1,058
Cleveland	40,641	65.18%	21,707	34.82%	18,934	30.37%	62,348
Coal	1,627	81.07%	380	18.93%	1,247	62.13%	2,007
Comanche	14,941	74.60%	5,086	25.40%	9,855	49.21%	20,027
Cotton	1,660	82.38%	355	17.62%	1,305	64.76%	2,015
Craig	3,319	76.63%	1,012	23.37%	2,307	53.27%	4,331
Creek	12,936	66.49%	6,519	33.51%	6,417	32.98%	19,455
Custer	4,681	68.55%	2,148	31.45%	2,533	37.09%	6,829
Delaware	6,807	68.72%	3,098	31.28%	3,709	37.45%	9,905
Dewey	1,291	69.67%	562	30.33%	729	39.34%	1,853
Ellis	972	63.08%	569	36.92%	403	26.15%	1,541
Garfield	10,760	66.79%	5,351	33.21%	5,409	33.57%	16,111
Garvin	5,745	71.38%	2,304	28.62%	3,441	42.75%	8,049
Grady	9,151	66.61%	4,587	33.39%	4,564	33.22%	13,738
Grant	1,302	68.85%	589	31.15%	713	37.70%	1,891
Greer	1,085	70.23%	460	29.77%	625	40.45%	1,545
Harmon	559	74.43%	192	25.57%	367	48.87%	751
Harper	746	64.53%	410	35.47%	336	29.07%	1,156
Haskell	2,426	75.44%	790	24.56%	1,636	50.87%	3,216
Hughes	2,526	75.88%	803	24.12%	1,723	51.76%	3,329
Jackson	3,673	65.30%	1,952	34.70%	1,721	30.60%	5,625
Jefferson	1,402	80.34%	343	19.66%	1,059	60.69%	1,745
Johnston	2,253	81.39%	515	18.61%	1,738	62.79%	2,768
Kay	9,054	68.85%	4,096	31.15%	4,958	37.70%	13,150
Kingfisher	2,921	60.10%	1,939	39.90%	982	20.21%	4,860
Kiowa	2,148	77.32%	630	22.68%	1,518	54.64%	2,778
Latimer	2,019	76.22%	630	23.78%	1,389	52.43%	2,649
Le Flore	7,963	71.98%	3,100	28.02%	4,863	43.96%	11,063
Lincoln	7,023	67.58%	3,369	32.42%	3,654	35.16%	10,392
Logan	6,408	59.96%	4,280	40.04%	2,128	19.91%	10,688
Love	1,797	80.08%	447	19.92%	1,350	60.16%	2,244
Major	1,603	57.37%	1,191	42.63%	412	14.75%	2,794
Marshall	2,650	75.03%	882	24.97%	1,768	50.06%	3,532
Mayes	8,300	73.84%	2,940	26.16%	5,360	47.69%	11,240
McClain	6,622	65.25%	3,527	34.75%	3,095	30.50%	10,149
McCurtain	4,485	69.96%	1,926	30.04%	2,559	39.92%	6,411
McIntosh	4,626	76.72%	1,404	23.28%	3,222	53.43%	6,030
Murray	3,015	76.70%	916	23.30%	2,099	53.40%	3,931
Muskogee	12,885	75.79%	4,117	24.21%	8,768	51.57%	17,002
Noble	2,460	67.03%	1,210	32.97%	1,250	34.06%	3,670
Nowata	2,026	70.69%	840	29.31%	1,186	41.38%	2,866
Okfuskee	2,147	74.73%	726	25.27%	1,421	49.46%	2,873
Oklahoma	110,726	63.02%	64,987	36.98%	45,739	26.03%	175,713
Okmulgee	7,321	75.48%	2,378	24.52%	4,943	50.96%	9,699
Osage	8,833	71.58%	3,507	28.42%	5,326	43.16%	12,340
Ottawa	5,211	72.98%	1,929	27.02%	3,282	45.97%	7,140
Pawnee	3,049	68.95%	1,373	31.05%	1,676	37.90%	4,422
Payne	12,006	68.47%	5,529	31.53%	6,477	36.94%	17,535
Pittsburg	8,076	74.20%	2,808	25.80%	5,268	48.40%	10,884
Pontotoc	7,313	73.83%	2,592	26.17%	4,721	47.66%	9,905
Pottawatomie	12,257	70.73%	5,073	29.27%	7,184	41.45%	17,330
Pushmataha	2,330	80.54%	563	19.46%	1,767	61.08%	2,893
Roger Mills	983	67.24%	479	32.76%	504	34.47%	1,462
Rogers	15,674	65.44%	8,278	34.56%	7,396	30.88%	23,952
Seminole	4,384	70.50%	1,834	29.50%	2,550	41.01%	6,218
Sequoyah	5,882	71.52%	2,342	28.48%	3,540	43.04%	8,224
Stephens	9,168	69.22%	4,076	30.78%	5,092	38.45%	13,244
Texas	1,642	42.06%	2,262	57.94%	-620	-15.88%	3,904
Tillman	2,185	82.64%	459	17.36%	1,726	65.28%	2,644
Tulsa	90,459	61.32%	57,060	38.68%	33,399	22.64%	147,519
Wagoner	10,977	62.94%	6,464	37.06%	4,513	25.88%	17,441
Washington	8,995	58.94%	6,265	41.06%	2,730	17.89%	15,260
Washita	2,766	71.40%	1,108	28.60%	1,658	42.80%	3,874
Woods	2,009	69.16%	896	30.84%	1,113	38.31%	2,905
Woodward	3,517	65.53%	1,850	34.47%	1,667	31.06%	5,367
Totals	616,135	66.50%	310,327	33.50%	305,808	33.01%	926,462

==== Counties that flipped from Republican to Democratic ====
- Alfalfa (Largest city: Helena)
- Canadian (Largest city: Yukon)
- Cleveland (Largest city: Norman)
- Comanche (Largest city: Lawton)
- Custer (Largest city: Weatherford)
- Ellis (Largest city: Shattuck)
- Garfield (Largest city: Enid)
- Grant (Largest city: Medford)
- Harper (Largest city: Laverne)
- Jackson (Largest city: Altus)
- Kay (Largest city: Ponca City)
- Kingfisher (Largest city: Kingfisher)
- Logan (Largest city: Guthrie)
- Major (Largest city: Fairview)
- McClain (Largest city: Newcastle)
- Noble (Largest city: Perry)
- Oklahoma (Largest city: Oklahoma City)
- Roger Mills (Largest city: Cheyenne)
- Stephens (Largest city: Duncan)
- Tulsa (Largest city: Tulsa)
- Wagoner (Largest city: Coewta)
- Washington (Largest city: Bartlesville)
- Woodward (Largest city: Woodward)

== See also ==
- 2006 Oklahoma elections
