= Kevin Easley =

American politician

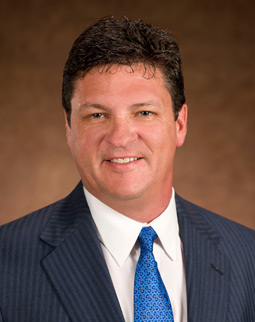
- Kevin Easley

Member of the Oklahoma Senate from the 18th district
- In office 1990–2004
- Preceded by: Donald Ferrell (Note: The 18th district did not exist between 1973 and 1990.)
- Succeeded by: Mary Easley

Member of the Oklahoma House of Representatives
- In office 1989–1990
- Preceded by: Bill Brewster
- Succeeded by: Fred Stanley
- In office 1985–1989
- Preceded by: Twyla Mason Gra
- Succeeded by: Bill Brewster
- Constituency: 23rd (1985-1989); 49th (1989-1990)

Personal details
- Born: 1960 (age 65–66)
- Parent: Mary Easley
- Occupation: Politician, businessman

Kevin Easley (born 1960) is an American oil and gas executive who was a leading legislator in the Oklahoma House of Representatives and the Oklahoma Senate for 18 years and the top executive at the Grand River Dam Authority for seven years in the U.S. State of Oklahoma. He is the President and Chief Executive Officer of New Dominion, LLC, in Tulsa, Oklahoma.

== Early life and education ==
Easley was born in 1960, the son of Truman and Mary Easley. After graduating in 1978 from Tulsa's East Central High School, he attended the University of Tulsa where he earned a bachelor's degree in business administration in 1982. He earned a master's degree in business administration with honors from Oklahoma Christian University in 2009.

== Professional career ==
Easley served Oklahomans as a member of the Oklahoma House of Representatives from 1985 to 1990 and as a member of the Oklahoma Senate from 1991 to 2003. While a legislator, Easley also held various management roles for Samson Energy, Home-Stake Oil and Gas Company, and BP Amoco. He was the executive director of the Grand River Dam Authority from March 2004 through April 2011, and investments director at the authority from 2010 through April 2011. He was named president and chief executive officer of New Dominion, LLC, in August, 2011.

== Political career ==
At just 24 years of age, Easley joined the Oklahoma House of Representatives in January 1985 as its youngest member. As a House member that year, he authored a law requiring drivers and passengers in moving motor vehicles to wear seatbelts.

In 1990, Easley won a seat in the Oklahoma Senate, and as a Senator, turned his attention to bettering the state's economy and environment. A joint resolution he authored in 1991 created a new state commission to study how to boost natural gas prices, and, in 1992, he authored a law recommended by the commission that required operators of hundreds of the state's largest natural gas wells to cut production during the warmest months of the year in an effort to boost prices for the commodity to spur more drilling activity within the state.

In 1993, as Chairman of the Oklahoma Senate Natural Resources Committee, Easley authored a law creating, funding and setting out duties for the Oklahoma Energy Resources Board, and also authored a law that consolidated Oklahoma's environmental regulatory efforts into a new agency, the Oklahoma Department of Environmental Quality.

In 1994, Easley authored a law setting up tax breaks for technologically challenging oil and gas well drilling and production techniques within Oklahoma to encourage more drilling within the state. Those tax breaks, periodically renewed by the Legislature, continue today.

In January 2004, Easley resigned his Senate seat to become the Executive Director of the Grand River Development Authority. The state-owned electric utility is fully funded by revenues from electric and water sales, serves nearly 500,000 homes in Oklahoma, and manages 70,000 surface acres of lakes in the state, including Grand Lake, Lake Hudson and the W.R. Holway Reservoir.

Under his leadership, the Authority:

- Created a new Assistant General Manager position in 2004 to formulate marketing plans and to get long-term power provider contracts to secure future revenue streams for the authority. It also, in the same year, created a new Office of Ecosystems Management within the authority to clean shorelines, to map structures and docks at Grand Lake and to improve the authority's stewardship of the natural resources under its control.
- Focused in 2005 on adding conservation and reclamation projects that included water quality studies, boater and sportsmen educational programs, and habitat improvement projects undertaken with cooperation from the Oklahoma Water Resources Board and Oklahoma Department of Wildlife Conservation.
- Prepared a final draft in late 2007 of a shoreline management plan for Grand Lake to serve as a blueprint for future development around the 46,500-acre surface lake.
- Issued more than $575 million in revenue bonds in 2008 to make various system upgrades, including buying part ownership of a natural gas-fired power plant to add to the authority's portfolio of dams and coal-fired generating stations. The authority successfully sold the bonds at an attractive interest rate because of improved credit ratings brought about by solid management of the authority by its officers and board.
- Built and opened in 2009 a new Ecosystems and Education Center at Grand Lake that includes a water quality laboratory, storage facilities and conference space for lectures and public educational programs.

== Honors and memberships ==
- In 2002, Easley was named Man of the Year by the Oklahoma Rural Water Association in appreciation and recognition of his dedicated service and leadership at the local, state and national levels to promote the development and expansion of rural water systems, and for his exceptional efforts to assure an adequate supply of good quality water for all rural Oklahomans.
- In 2002, Easley also received the President's Award from the Grand Lake Association in recognition of his outstanding contributions and his continued support of the Grand Lake area.
- In 2004, Easley received a Special Recognition Award from the South Grand Lake Area Chamber of Commerce (known as the Grand Lake Area Chamber of Commerce in 2014) honoring him for "outstanding and dedicated service making Grand Lake the most desirable location in Oklahoma."
- Easley served on the American Public Power Association Board of Directors from 2006 through 2010, and served on the American Public Power Association's Executive Committee from 2009 through 2010.
- Easley served on the Executive Committee of the United States Energy Council from 1994 to 2004.
- Easley served on the Southwest Power Pool Board of Directors from 2005 to 2011.
- Easley currently serves on the Tulsa Regional Chamber of Commerce Board of Directors.

== Personal life ==
Easley is married to DeaAnn Winkle. They have three children and reside in Broken Arrow, Oklahoma.
