= Ryan Lively =

American chemical engineer

Ryan P. Lively is an American chemical engineer and professor currently holding the Thomas C. DeLoach Jr. Endowed Professorship in the School of Chemical & Biomolecular Engineering at the Georgia Institute of Technology. His research primarily focuses on fluid separation processes, energy-efficient separation methods, and the development of advanced materials for industrial applications. He is a member of the Board of Reviewing Editors for the journal Science.

== Early life and education ==
Ryan Lively was born in 1984 and spent his early life in Gainesville, Florida. He enrolled at the Georgia Institute of Technology in 2002. He completed his Bachelor of Science (B.S.) in 2006 and earned his Doctorate (Ph.D.) in 2011, both in Chemical Engineering, from Georgia Tech.

== Career ==
After completing his Ph.D., Lively worked as a post-doctoral research engineer at Algenol Biofuels, where he made contributions to the field of biofuel purification. In this role, he published 25 papers and filed two U.S. patent applications.

Lively joined the faculty of Georgia Tech's School of Chemical & Biomolecular Engineering, where he currently serves as a full professor. His tenure at Georgia Tech has been marked by research contributions in the field of chemical and biomolecular engineering.

== Research and contributions ==
Lively's research interests encompass a range of topics including energy-efficient separation processes, advanced membrane technologies, and the development of high-performance polymers and microporous materials. His notable work, as co-author of the article "Seven chemical separations to change the world" in the journal Nature, highlights the potential of purifying mixtures without using heat to lower global energy use and emissions. He has further contributed to the field with his work on "From water to organics in membrane separations" published in Nature Materials.

Additionally, Lively has made advancements in the field of organic liquid separation, as demonstrated in his co-authored Science papers, "Reverse osmosis molecular differentiation of organic liquids using carbon molecular sieve membranes", "N-Aryl–linked spirocyclic polymers for membrane separations of complex hydrocarbon mixtures", and "Fluorine-rich poly(arylene amine) membranes for the separation of liquid aliphatic compounds".

== Awards and recognition ==
Lively has received several awards for his contributions to chemical engineering, including the 2020 Allan P. Colburn Award from AIChE, the 2022 Curtis W. McGraw Award from ASEE, and the FRI/John G. Kunesh Award from AIChE’s Separations Division. He was also honored with the 2016 CETL/BP Young Faculty Teaching Award , the 2018 DOE Early Career Award, and he was a Finalist for the Blavatnik Awards for Young Scientists.

Additionally, he serves as an editor for the Journal of Membrane Science and is the Secretary of the North American Membrane Society. He is also the Director of the UNCAGE-ME, an Energy Frontier Research Center of the U.S. Department of Energy.

== Publications and patents ==
Lively has over 220 publications in the field of separations, including articles in journals like Science and Nature.
