= Steven Winberg =

American fossil fuel executive

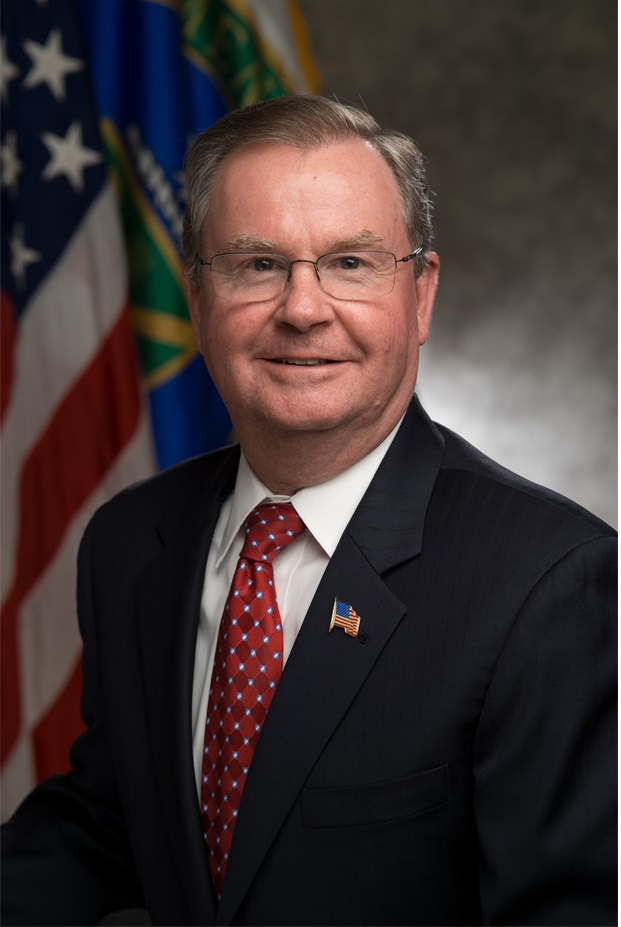

Assistant Secretary for Fossil Energy
- In office November 27, 2017 – January 2021
- President: Donald Trump
- Preceded by: Mark Maddox (acting)
- Succeeded by: Jennifer Wilcox (acting)

Personal details
- Born: Rome, New York
- Education: State University of New York Maritime College; University of Pittsburgh

Steven Eric Winberg is an American businessman and government official who served as the Assistant Secretary for Fossil Energy from November 2017 to January 2021.

== Career ==
Winberg previously served as vice president for research and development at Consol Energy and as a senior program manager with the Battelle Memorial Institute. Winberg was the board chair for the FutureGen Industrial Alliance, a coalition of power producers, coal producers, and equipment manufacturers which was established to pursue a public/private partnership to build the world's first near-zero emissions coal-fueled power plant. Winberg holds two patents related to NOx emissions reduction using coal and natural gas.

=== Assistant Secretary for Fossil Energy ===
Although having had to admit that coal was no longer considered viable for the production of electricity Steven Winberg, in 2020, pointed out the actual carbon value of coal including metals, which can be extracted from coal ash, and their value for the production of electronic equipment. He presented a range of products at the annual American Legislative Exchange Council meeting and later at the Senate Committee on Energy and Natural Resources where he demonstrated the use of coal in coal-based carbon foam, decking material and roofing tiles and the prospect, in the foreseeable future, to build a fire-proof house with coal.

In October 2020, Winberg signed a "memorandum of cooperation in the field of carbon capture, utilization and storage and carbon recycling" with Japan as another step to combat climate change.

== Personal life ==
Steven Winberg is married to Anne and has two daughters.

== Publications ==
- Clean Coal Is Crucial for American Jobs, Energy Security, and National Supply Chains
