= Mike Ming =

American energy industry executive and state government official

6th Oklahoma Secretary of Energy
- In office January 10, 2011 – May 8, 2013
- Governor: Mary Fallin
- Preceded by: Bobby Wegener
- Succeeded by: Position merged into Oklahoma Secretary of Energy and Environment

Personal details
- Born: January 29, 1958 (age 68) Durango, Colorado
- Education: Stanford University; US Air Force Academy
- Profession: Businessman

Mike Ming (born January 29, 1958) is an American energy industry executive who previously served as the General Manager of General Electric's Global Research Technology Center in Oklahoma City. He currently heads Ming Energy Partners, a sustainable energy consulting firm based in Oklahoma City.

== Biography ==
Ming obtained a bachelor's degree in petroleum engineering and a master's degree in engineering management from Stanford University. He attended the U.S. Air Force Academy where he earned academic honors.

After graduating from college, Ming joined Chevron as a drilling and production engineer. Ming has spent most of his career in the energy industry. He has previously served as vice president of production for Bracken Energy Company in Oklahoma City. Ming was also vice president of engineering at K. Stewart Petroleum Corporation, also in Oklahoma City, and was a managing member of K. Stewart Energy Group out of Edmond, Oklahoma. He has previously served as an adjunct professor for energy management at the University of Oklahoma Michael F. Price College of Business.

Ming served as a strategic advisor to the United States Department of Energy for the department's strategic planning initiative. In 2009, Governor Brad Henry appointed him as a member of the Oklahoma Clean Energy Independence Commission.

He previously served as the President of "Research Partnership to Secure Energy for America" (RPSEA) in Houston, Texas. RPSEA is a $500 million non-profit organization with over 180 members representing the energy industry, academia and research community that works to research the development of new energy sources and the expansion of existing resources.

== Fallin Administration ==
On January 5, 2011, Republican Governor-elect Mary Fallin announced that she had selected Ming to serve as her Oklahoma Secretary of Energy. Ming was sworn in on January 10, 2011. He resigned on May 8, 2013, to join General Electric's Global Research Technology Center in Oklahoma City.

== Personal life ==
Ming lives with his wife Diane in Edmond, Oklahoma.

Political offices
Preceded by Bobby Wegener	Oklahoma Secretary of Energy; Under Governor Mary Fallin; January 10, 2011 - May 8, 2013	Office merged into Oklahoma Secretary of Energy and Environment
