= Albaugh =

Albaugh is a surname of Austrian origin. It is an anglicized variation of the German language surname Albach. The American descendants of Austrian immigrants changed the name to Albaugh in the late 19th or early 20th century.

Notable people with the surname include:

- Dennis Albaugh (born 1949), American businessman, founder and chairman of Albaugh LLC
- James Albaugh (born 1950), American businessman, former Boeing executive
- John Albaugh, American congressional staffer convicted in the Jack Abramoff affair
- John W. Albaugh (1837–1909), American stage actor
- Walter H. Albaugh (1890–1942), American politician from Ohio
