= Gary Sherrer =

Gary Sherrer may refer to:

- Gary Sherrer (Oklahoma politician)
- Gary Sherrer (Kansas politician)
