= Bobby Wegener =

American lawyer

Oklahoma Secretary of Energy
- In office 2008–2011
- Governor: Brad Henry
- Preceded by: David Fleischaker
- Succeeded by: Mike Ming

Oklahoma Deputy Secretary of Energy
- In office 2005–2008
- Governor: Brad Henry

Personal details
- Occupation: Lawyer

Robert "Bobby" Wegener served as Oklahoma's Secretary of Energy from 2008-2011, having been appointed by Governor of Oklahoma Brad Henry in 2008. He was Governor Henry's second Secretary of Energy, succeeding David Fleischaker. Wegener had previously served as Henry's Deputy Secretary of Energy from 2005 to 2008.

== Personal life and education ==
A graduate of Texas A&M University and the University of Oklahoma College of Law, Wegener came to state service from the Oklahoma City law firm, Clark, Stakem, Wood & Patten. Secretary Wegener’s general litigation practice included work on oil and gas, public utilities, and education law. He published regular articles in “Better Schools,” the newspaper for the Cooperative Council for Oklahoma School Administrators.

In 2005, Governor Brad Henry appointed Wegener as his Deputy Secretary of Energy to serve under Henry's first Energy Secretary David Fleischaker. As Deputy Secretary, Wegener represented Oklahoma in Azerbaijan to help initiate economic and educational partnerships between Oklahoma and the former Soviet Republic.

== Secretary of Energy ==
In 2008, Governor Henry appointed Wegener as his second secretary of energy following Fleischaker's resignation to become the president and CEO of Jolen Operating Company. As secretary of energy, Wegener is responsible for overseeing various agencies of the executive branch, including the Oklahoma Bioenergy Center, Oklahoma Corporation Commission, the Grand River Dam Authority and the Oklahoma Department of Mines.

Since taking office, Secretary Wegener's office focused on growing Oklahoma's extensive energy sector by furthering the success of the state's oil and natural gas industries while developing renewable and sustainable energy resources for the state. Wegener has supported continuing efforts to promote the Oklahoma Bioenergy Center (which promotes the development of a biofuels industry in Oklahoma) and development and expansion of wind power. Secretary Wegener has also promoted demand side management policies at the Oklahoma Corporation Commission, the state's electric utility regulatory agency.

Wegener is Co-founder and Partner of Next Energy Partners.

== Wegener in the news ==
- High-voltage transmission line may unlock Oklahoma’s potential
- EnergyWire could bring 3,000 megawatts
- Experts say wind energy key to Oklahoma economy
- Clean-energy jobs in Oklahoma climbing, Pew study shows
- Tulsa conference extols the value of all fuels
- Economic diversity grows in state

== See also ==
- Oklahoma State Cabinet

Political offices
Preceded by David Fleischaker	Oklahoma Secretary of Energy; Under Governor Brad Henry; 2008 - 2011	Succeeded by Mike Ming
