= Ken McQueen =

Oklahoma Secretary of Energy and Environment
- In office August 15, 2022 – December 3, 2024
- Governor: Kevin Stitt
- Preceded by: Kenneth Wagner
- Succeeded by: Jeff Starling

New Mexico Secretary of Energy, Minerals and Natural Resources
- In office 2016–2019
- Governor: Susana Martinez
- Preceded by: David Martin
- Succeeded by: Sarah Cottrell Propst

Personal details
- Education: University of Tulsa

Ken McQueen is an American civil servant who served as the Oklahoma Secretary of Energy and Environment from 2022 to 2024 in the administration of Governor Kevin Stitt and as the New Mexico Secretary of Energy, Minerals and Natural Resources from 2016 to 2019 in the administration of Governor Susana Martinez.

== Biography ==
Ken McQueen graduated from the University of Tulsa with a B.S. in petroleum engineering. From December 2016 to January 2019 he served as New Mexico Secretary of Energy, Minerals and Natural Resources under Governor Susana Martinez. In 2019, he joined the Environmental Protection Agency as the Region 6 Administrator during Donald Trump's first presidency.

On August 15, 2022, Governor Kevin Stitt appointed McQueen as the Oklahoma Secretary of Energy and Environment replacing Kenneth Wagner. McQueen was fired by Stitt on December 3, 2024, after appearing at a court hearing over poultry farming's pollution of the Illinois River alongside Attorney General Gentner Drummond. McQueen said he learned of his firing from social media.
