= Ernest Istook =

American politician (born 1950)

Ernie Istook
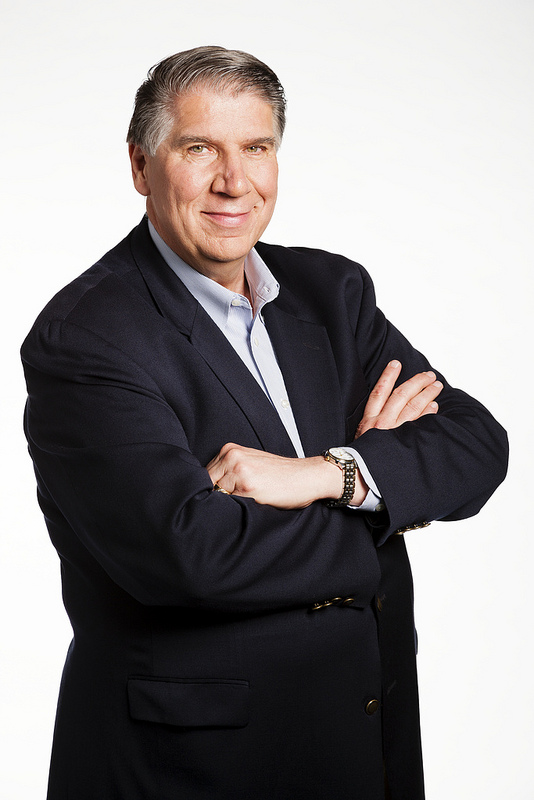
- Istook in 2012

Member of the U.S. House of Representatives from Oklahoma's 5th district
- In office January 3, 1993 – January 3, 2007
- Preceded by: Mickey Edwards
- Succeeded by: Mary Fallin

Personal details
- Born: February 11, 1950 (age 76) Fort Worth, Texas, U.S.
- Party: Republican
- Spouse: Judy Istook
- Children: 5
- Education: Baylor University (BA); Oklahoma City University (JD)
- Istook's voice Istook discusses FY2005 transportation, treasury, and related appropriations. Recorded September 14, 2004

Ernest James "Ernie" Istook Jr. (born February 11, 1950) is an American retired lawyer and politician who served as a Republican member of the United States House of Representatives from Oklahoma's 5th congressional district. He held his congressional seat for 14 years, completing seven terms in the House. Currently, Istook is a Distinguished Fellow at The Heritage Foundation in Washington, D.C., and also a talk radio host. In 2010, Istook became a Fellow at the Harvard Kennedy School leading a study on Propaganda in American Politics.

He was a member of the Appropriations and the Homeland Security committees. He was the Republican gubernatorial nominee in 2006, running against incumbent Democratic governor Brad Henry. Istook lost the gubernatorial race by a wide margin, getting only 33.5% of the vote to Henry's 66.5%.

== Early life and career ==
Istook's grandparents immigrated to the U.S. from Hungary through Ellis Island and spoke Hungarian at home. He graduated from Castleberry High School in Fort Worth, Texas in 1967 and received a Bachelor of Arts degree from Baylor University in Waco, Texas in 1971. He eventually moved to Warr Acres, a suburb of Oklahoma City.

He worked full-time as a radio news reporter first at KOMA (now KOKC) and then at WKY in Oklahoma City while attending law school, receiving a Juris Doctor degree from Oklahoma City University School of Law in 1976. He was also a member of Kappa Sigma fraternity. After graduation, he established his own law firm, and practiced law for 15 years.

Istook also was director of the Oklahoma State Alcoholic and Beverage Control Board (1977–1978), was legal counsel to popular Oklahoma governor David L. Boren (1978), and was a member of the board of the Metropolitan Library System (1982–1986), chairman of the Warr Acres city council (1982–1986), director of the Warr Acres Chamber of Commerce, and an Oklahoma state representative 1987–1993.

== U.S. House of Representatives ==
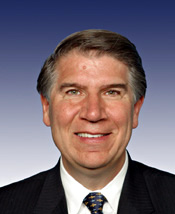
Congressman Istook official photo

=== 1992 election ===
In the 1992 Republican primary, Istook challenged and defeated incumbent Deputy House Minority Whip Mickey Edwards in a three-way primary that also featured former federal prosecutor Bill Price. Both Istook and Price used Edwards' involvement in the House banking scandal to chip away at his support.

Istook narrowly defeated his Democratic challenger, Laurie Williams, in November, winning by only six points. He never faced another contest nearly that close, and was reelected six more times from what has long been considered the most Republican district in Oklahoma. The Democrats didn't even put up a candidate against him in 1994.

Although Istook lives in Warr Acres, he was listed on the House roll as "R-Oklahoma City".

=== Political views ===
As a member of Congress, Istook focused on issues surrounding national defense and homeland security, transportation, education, labor, social services and religious liberty. He is anti-abortion and supports the position that abortion should be prohibited except when the mother's life is in danger. He does not support federal funding of embryonic stem cell research. Istook opposes gay marriage and the adoption of children into same-sex homes. He has favored several constitutional amendments including an amendment banning same-sex marriage and an amendment to restrict burning the U.S. flag.

He introduced the Religious Freedom Amendment, a Constitutional Amendment to permit school prayer, in 1995 and (slightly modified) in 1997. On June 4, 1998, the House voted 224–203, with 7 abstentions, in favor of it, but it failed as a Constitutional amendment, needing a 2/3 majority to pass. He reintroduced it in 1999, and again with different text in 2001, renamed the Religious Speech Amendment, and in 2003. The other efforts did not make it out of the House Subcommittee on the Constitution.

On economics, Istook opposed more federal funds for health coverage and supported welfare and Social Security reform, including the creation of personal accounts within Social Security. He supported the Bush administration's tax cuts and wanted to make those permanent. He wrote a bill to relieve the tax burden for married couples, which was passed in February 2000 as the Marriage Tax Penalty Relief Act of 2000. He favors expansion of free trade; he voted in favor of CAFTA. He wants the U.S. to withdraw from the World Trade Organization, wants the end of the estate tax, and supported Normal Trade Relations with the People's Republic of China to be made permanent. In 2004 Istook travelled to Beijing to speak with Chinese leaders and expand trade between the U.S. and China. In particular his visit focused on the opportunities for Oklahoma to trade in China.

Istook voted to make the USA PATRIOT Act permanent and supports intelligence gathering by the military. Istook favors military recruiting on college campuses that receive federal aid. Istook endorsed the Bush administration and its handling of the War in Iraq and supports higher Defense Department funding.

Istook does not support a U.S. ratification of the Kyoto Protocol nor heavy taxpayer subsidies for alternative fuel sources. He supports drilling in ANWR.

=== Congressional committees ===
Istook served on several congressional committees during his time in the House. He was a member of the Appropriations Committee from the mid-1990s and chaired a number of its subcommittees including Treasury, Transportation, and Special Agencies. He also served on the Homeland Security Committee and was a founder of the re-established Republican Study Committee.

=== Transit funding controversies ===
Istook is against the current federal funding level for Amtrak. For several years, he chaired the subcommittee on Treasury, Transportation, and Special Agencies, which oversaw transportation funding. In 2004, Istook denied special transportation funding (earmarks) requests for districts of 21 Republican House members because the other Republicans had written a letter supporting of funding of $1.8 billion for Amtrak. Istook took the view that their request for major funding increases for Amtrak took precedence over their requests for their districts, and viewed those requests as trying to "double-dip" into the Treasury. Istook lost the chairmanship in 2005, in large part because others in the Republican party were still upset over his handling of this issue.

Istook introduced language into an FY2004 federal spending bill that would cut funding for transit authorities that sponsored advertisements contradicting current government policies and laws regarding marijuana. Judge Paul L. Friedman of the U.S. District Court for the District of Columbia later ruled that the "Istook Amendment", as it came to be known, was unconstitutional on grounds that it violated the First Amendment, stating "the government articulated no legitimate state interest in the suppression of this particular speech other than the fact that it disapproves of the message, an illegitimate and constitutionally impermissible reason".

=== Jack Abramoff ===
Istook received $29,000 in campaign contributions from Abramoff and some of his clients, and wrote letters urging the Bush administration to reject a casino proposal that Abramoff's clients opposed. On January 9, 2006, Istook announced he would give $23,000 in Abramoff-related money that was donated to his re-election campaign or his PAC to the Boy Scouts of America. This is in addition to $6,000 in Abramoff-related donations given to the Oklahoma Medical Research Foundation in December 2005. His congressional campaign paid back $5,126 to Abramoff's Sports Suites LLC, for the use in 2003 of skyboxes by the congressman for an American Idol concert and a Washington Redskins game. Istook has denied any connection between the donations and his activities, saying in 2006, "I barely knew the man."

Istook is identified in documents filed in June 2008 against his former chief of staff, John Albaugh, as "Representative 4". According to the documents, Istook called Abramoff in 2003 to thank him in advance for use of one of Abramoff's FedEx Field skyboxes for a fundraising event. Istook asked Abramoff which projects his clients wanted in the upcoming transportation bill. The government filing refers to an Abramoff e-mail saying Istook "had basically asked what we want in the transportation bill", and telling his colleagues at Greenberg Traurig to "make sure we load up our entire Christmas list". Four of Kevin A. Ring's clients later received at least $1 million each in the transportation bill. On June 2, 2008, Albaugh pleaded guilty to one count of corruption and conspiracy.

=== Ratings ===
- 0% by NARAL
- 92% by the Christian Coalition
- 100% by the Federation for American Immigration Reform
- 0% by SANE
- 0% by League of Conservation Voters
- 63% by National Taxpayers Union
- "A" by NRA Political Victory Fund
- 40% by Coalition on Urban Renewal and Education
- 17% by National Education Association
- 0% Oklahoma Passenger Rail Association

== 2006 gubernatorial race ==
Oklahoma gubernatorial election 2006 results map. Red denotes counties won by Ernest Istook, Blue denotes those won by Brad Henry.

On October 3, 2005, Istook announced he would run for governor of Oklahoma against Democratic incumbent Brad Henry. He was immediately the consensus frontrunner for the nomination, as a seven-term incumbent U.S. representative whose district covered most of the Oklahoma City area, the state's largest media market.

In the July 2006 primary, he received 55% of the vote to become the Republican nominee. Oil businessman Bob Sullivan was second with 31%.

Henry and Istook faced each other in the November general election. After a heated campaign, Henry defeated Istook, gathering 66.5% of the total vote—the biggest landslide in an Oklahoma governor's race in almost half a century. Istook even lost his own congressional district, as well as a number of areas that normally vote Republican. He only carried the three Panhandle counties of Beaver, Cimarron and Texas.

Istook's campaign was managed by campaign manager Chip Englander, a political operative from California. National media attention was attracted when it turned out that Jordan Edmund, one of the campaign's workers from California, had been one of the congressional pages who received unwelcome attention in the Mark Foley scandal.

== Post-congressional career ==
Ernest Istook was a distinguished fellow at The Heritage Foundation and host of the conservative think tank's radio show, "Istook Live". Istook contributed opinion columns to a variety of outlets including The Washington Times, Human Events The Huffington Post, and Newsmax. He has been a talk radio host. He has appeared frequently on national radio programs as a guest host and has filled-in for a number of talk radio hosts including Mark Levin, Jerry Doyle and on "America's Morning News". Istook has also been a guest analyst on national television including appearances on most major news programs.

He became a Fellow for the Institute of Politics at Harvard University's Kennedy School of Government in early 2010, during which he taught a study group on Propaganda in American Politics. In 2014, Istook joined the Board of Advisors of the National Federation of Republican Assemblies. He is a member of the Council for National Policy.

He now teaches History and Political Sciences classes at Utah Valley University in Orem, UT and practices law.

== Personal life ==
In 2008, Istook was appointed to the National Advisory Board for the national children's charity Operation Kids. He is also an active supporter of the Boy Scouts of America and served several years as a scoutmaster.

Istook and his wife Judy (whom he met through his radio job at KOKC and married in 1973) have five children, two sons and three daughters, and fifteen grandchildren. Istook, who comes from a Southern Baptist background, is now a member of the Church of Jesus Christ of Latter-day Saints (LDS Church).

== Electoral history ==
Oklahoma's 5th congressional district: Results 1992–2004
| Year | Democrat | Votes | Pct | Republican | Votes | Pct | 3rd Party | Party | Votes | Pct | |
|---|---|---|---|---|---|---|---|---|---|---|---|
| 1992 | Laurie Williams | 107,579 | 47% | Ernest J. Istook, Jr. | 123,237 | 53% | | | | | |
| 1994 | (no candidate) | | | Ernest J. Istook, Jr. | 136,877 | 78% | Tom Keith | Independent | 38,270 | 22% | |
| 1996 | James L. Forsythe | 57,594 | 27% | Ernest J. Istook, Jr. | 148,362 | 70% | Ava Kennedy | Independent | 6,835 | 3% | |
| 1998 | M. C. Smothermon | 48,182 | 32% | Ernest J. Istook, Jr. | 103,217 | 68% | | | | | |
| 2000 | Garland McWatters | 53,275 | 27% | Ernest J. Istook, Jr. | 134,159 | 68% | Bill Maguire | Independent | 5,930 | 3% | * |
| 2002 | Lou Barlow | 63,208 | 32% | Ernest J. Istook, Jr. | 121,374 | 62% | Donna C. Davis | Independent | 10,469 | 5% | |
| 2004 | Bert Smith | 92,719 | 34% | Ernest J. Istook, Jr. | 180,430 | 66% | | | | | |

* Minor candidates notes: In 2000, Libertarian Robert T. Murphy received 2,658 votes (1%).

Summary of the November 7, 2006 Oklahoma gubernatorial election results
| Candidates | Party | Votes | % |
|---|---|---|---|
| Brad Henry (Incumbent) | Democratic Party | 616,033 | 66.50% |
| Ernest Istook | Republican Party | 310,273 | 33.50% |
| Total | | 926,306 | 100.0% |
Source: 2006 Election Results

U.S. House of Representatives
| Preceded by Mickey Edwards | Member of the U.S. House of Representatives from Oklahoma's 5th congressional district 1993–2007 | Succeeded by Mary Fallin |
Party political offices
| Preceded by Dan Burton | Chair of the Republican Study Committee; 1995–1999; Served alongside: Dan Burton, John Doolittle, Sam Johnson | Succeeded by David McIntosh |
| Preceded by Steve Largent | Republican nominee for Governor of Oklahoma; 2006 | Succeeded by Mary Fallin |
U.S. order of precedence (ceremonial)
| Preceded by Dave McCurdy as Former U.S. Representative | Order of precedence of the United States as Former U.S. Representative | Succeeded by Steve Pearce as Former U.S. Representative |
