= Jennifer Wilcox =

American chemical engineer

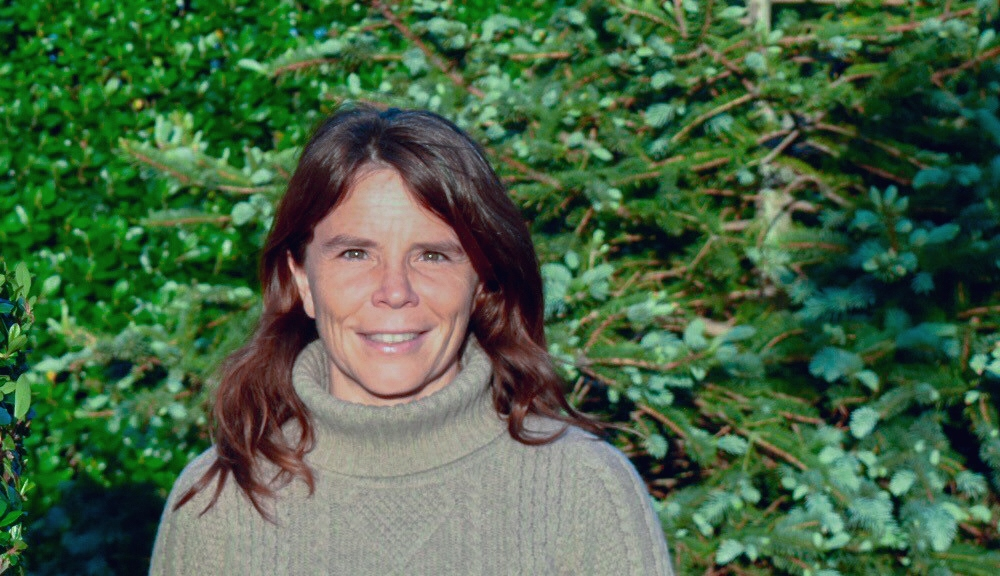
- Born: 5 July 1976 (age 49); Litchfield, Maine, US
- Education: University of Arizona MA in Physical Chemistry, PhD in Chemical Engineering 2004
- Alma mater: Wellesley College AB in Mathematics 1998
- Scientific career
- Fields: Chemical Engineering
- Institutions: Worcester Polytechnic Institute; Colorado School of Mines; Stanford University
- Website: ceclab.seas.upenn.edu

Jennifer Wilcox is an American chemical engineer and an expert in carbon capture and storage and the removal of CO_{2} from the atmosphere. She is the Presidential Distinguished Professor of Chemical Engineering and Energy Policy at University of Pennsylvania and a former James H. Manning Chaired Professor of Chemical Engineering at Worcester Polytechnic Institute. Wilcox conducts research focused on minimizing the environmental and climate impacts of our dependence on fossil fuels. In January 2021, she became acting Assistant Secretary for Fossil Energy and Carbon Management and Principal Deputy Assistant Secretary (PDAS) for Fossil Energy and Carbon Management.

== Early life and education ==
Wilcox was born on July 5, 1976, and grew up in a rural part of central Maine in a house that was on 22 acres of land with a stream. Her parents grew their own food in the summer and maintained a well on the property, exposing Wilcox to an independent living that shaped her appreciation for nature and to not take the Earth's resources for granted.

When Wilcox found out her rural high school, Oak Hill High School in Wales, Maine, didn't offer AP calculus classes that she would need to get into a selective college, she bought a calculus book and with three other students successfully convinced their principal to let them teach themselves calculus so they could take the AP exam. Wilcox also asked her high school Latin teacher to continue teaching her Latin during her junior and senior years as an independent study, which the teacher happily assisted. Wilcox was so proficient in Latin she taught younger students when the teacher was on leave. The extra efforts paid off as Wilcox was accepted into the women's liberal arts college of Wellesley College in Wellesley, Massachusetts. She graduated from Wellesley in 1998.

She enrolled in the Ph.D. program in chemical engineering at the University of Arizona and received both her master's and Ph.D. in four years while continuing to wait tables and teach at a community college.

== Career ==
After receiving her Ph.D. in 2004, Wilcox worked as an Assistant Professor of Chemical Engineering at Worcester Polytechnic from 2004 to 2008. She then took on the position of Assistant Professor of Energy Resources Engineering at Stanford University from 2008 to 2016. In 2016, Wilcox became an Associate Professor of Chemical and Biological Engineering at Colorado School of Mines, assuming the position of the Interim Department Head in 2017. In 2018, she left Mines to assume the James H. Manning Chaired Professorship of Chemical Engineering at Worcester Polytechnic Institute. In 2020, she left Worcester Polytechnic Institute to join the Chemical and Biomolecular Engineering Department and Kleinman Center for Energy Policy at the University of Pennsylvania.

Wilcox served on a number of committees including the National Academy of Sciences and the American Physical Society. She receives funding for her research through the National Science Foundation, Department of Energy and the private sector.

She spoke at the April 2018 TED talk about her research on Direct Air Capture.

In 2024, Wilcox took on the position of Chief Scientist at Isometric, a carbon registry.

== Awards and honors ==
Wilcox represented the National Science Foundation as a "New Face of Engineering for 2006", where she was featured in USA Today. She also won the American Chemical Society Petroleum Research Fund Young Investigator Award, the Army Research Office Young Investigator Award, and the Air & Waste Management Association Stern Award. In 2023, she was named one of the Time 100 Climate leaders. In 2024, she was named to the Grist 50 list.

== Memberships ==
She was selected as a member of the second cohort of the Department of Energy's Oppenheimer Energy Sciences Leadership Group.

Wilcox is a member of the American Institute of Chemical Engineers, the American Chemical Society, the North American Membrane Society, and the Ninety-Nines (the international organization of women pilots).

She is a Senior Fellow at the World Resources Institute.

== Publications ==
Wilcox is the first author to publish a textbook on carbon capture. Her book, Carbon Capture published in March 2012, discusses the fundamental chemical concepts ranging from thermodynamics, combustion, kinetics, mass transfer, material properties, and the relationship between the chemistry and process of carbon capture technologies.

As of January 2020, Wilcox also authored or co-authored 182 papers and publications. Her top three cited papers include, in order: "Carbon capture and storage (CCS): the way forward", " Methane leaks from North American natural gas systems ", and " Negative emissions—Part 2: Costs, potentials and side effects"

She was one of the primary authors and a co-editor of the Carbon Dioxide Removal Primer.

Wilcox started the Frontiers in Climate Negative Emissions Technologies Journal with co-editor Phil Renforth.

== Personal life ==
Wilcox is married and has one daughter. They live in Philadelphia.
