= Kenneth Wagner (Oklahoma cabinet secretary) =

Oklahoma Secretary of Energy and Environment
- In office January 14, 2019 – August 14, 2022
- Governor: Kevin Stitt
- Preceded by: Michael J. Teague
- Succeeded by: Ken McQueen

Kenneth Wagner is an American attorney who served as the Oklahoma Secretary of Energy and Environment between 2019 and 2022.

== Early life, education, and legal career ==
Wagner attended the University of Oklahoma and graduated from the University of Tulsa College of Law in 1993.

=== Friendship with Scott Pruitt ===
Wagner co-owned a company with Scott Pruitt that purchased a former lobbyist's home near the Oklahoma Capitol in Oklahoma City in December 2002, while Pruitt was a state senator. Pruitt later worked for Wagner's law firm Latham, Wagner Steele & Lehman. During Pruitt's tenure as Oklahoma Attorney General, Wagner's firm received over $600,000 in state contracts.

In March 2017, Scott Pruitt appointed Wagner as a senior adviser for regional and state affairs at the United States Environmental Protection Agency.

== Oklahoma Secretary of Energy and Environment ==
In November 2018, Oklahoma Gov. Kevin Stitt announced he would appoint Wagner as the Oklahoma Secretary of Energy and Environment. He was officially appointed Oklahoma Secretary of Energy and Environment to replace Michael J. Teague on January 14, 2019, pending the confirmation of the Oklahoma Senate. On July 22, 2019, Governor Kevin Stitt appointed him to the Southern States Energy Board, also to replace Teague. He was succeed as Secretary by Ken McQueen on August 15, 2022, and on the energy board on August 17.

As Secretary, Wagner opposed granting tribal governments in Oklahoma the authority to implement their own environmental regulations. He also supported hydrogen energy, natural gas, and renewable energy development in Oklahoma. He praised the United States Supreme Court's decision in West Virginia v. EPA.

In April 2022, Wagner was appointed the first executive director of the Hamm Institute for American Energy, a part of the Oklahoma State University named after Harold Hamm.
