= Gary Sherrer (Oklahoma politician) =

American politician

2nd and 6th Oklahoma Secretary of the Environment
- In office January 14, 2011 – June 30, 2014
- Governor: Mary Fallin
- Preceded by: J.D. Strong
- Succeeded by: Post Abolished
- In office January, 1995 – January, 1997
- Preceded by: Patty Eaton
- Succeeded by: Brian C. Griffin

Executive Director of the Oklahoma Water Resources Board
- In office January, 1995 – January 1997
- Governor: Frank Keating
- Succeeded by: Duane Smith

1st Oklahoma Secretary of Agriculture
- In office 1989–1995
- Governor: David Walters
- Preceded by: Post Created
- Succeeded by: Dennis Howard

Oklahoma Commissioner of Agriculture
- In office 1985–1995
- Governor: David Walters
- Succeeded by: Dennis Howard

Oklahoma state representative
- In office 1981–1989

Personal details
- Party: Democratic
- Occupation: Politician

Gary Sherrer is an American Democratic politician from Oklahoma. Sherrer served two terms as Oklahoma Secretary of the Environment under Republican governors Frank Keating (1995-1997) and Mary Fallin (2011-2013). Sherrer also served as Oklahoma Secretary of Agriculture under Democratic governor David Walters from 1989 to 1995.

== Early life ==
Sherrer is a graduate of Southeastern Oklahoma State University. He was a Democratic member of the Oklahoma House of Representatives from 1981 to 1989. After leaving the legislature, Sherrer served as director of legislative and regulatory affairs for the Oklahoma Farmers Union and then worked for the Oklahoma Association of Electric Cooperatives.

== Cabinet secretary ==
=== Walters administration ===
Governor David Walters appointed Sherrer to serve as the State's first Oklahoma Secretary of Agriculture. Walters also appointed him to concurrently as the Commissioner of the Oklahoma Department of Agriculture. He served in both of those positions from 1991 until the end of Walter's term in 1995.

=== Keating administration ===
In 1995, Walters choose not to seek re-election as governor. Frank Keating was elected to succeed him in that position. Keating asked Sherrer to stay on in his Administration. However, instead of Agriculture Secretary, Keating appoint Sherrer to serve as his Oklahoma Secretary of the Environment. In addition to his services as Secretary, the Oklahoma Water Resources Board appointed him to serve as their Executive Director.

Sherrer served in both of those positions until he resigned to return to the private sector in 1997. Governor Keating appointed Brian C. Griffin to succeed Sherrer as Secretary.

=== Fallin administration ===
Following the election of Republican Mary Fallin as governor in 2010, Fallin appointed Sherrer to her Taskforce on Economic Development to advise her on matter related to the economy. He served in that position from the entire transition process between Fallin's election in November 2010 and her inauguration in January 2011. On January 14, 2011, Governor Fallin announced that she had selected Sherrer to serve as her Oklahoma Secretary of the Environment in her Cabinet.

While serving in the Fallin Administration, Sherrer led negotiations between Oklahoma and Arkansas to protect the quality of the scenic rivers running through both states. Sherrer oversaw the Oklahoma Department of Wildlife Conservation's efforts to protect the Lesser Prairie Chicken, which avoided the need to place the animal under the protections of the Endangered Species Act by the United States Fish and Wildlife Service. Sherrer also oversaw the Oklahoma Department of Environmental Quality as it returned to compliance with the federal Safe Drinking Water Act. The compliance measures allowed the state to regain control over water quality in the state rather than the Environmental Protection Agency. After two and a half years as Environmental Secretary, Sherrer resigned his position to return to private life.

== Private sector ==
Following his resignation, Sherrer went to work for KAMO, a Vinita, Oklahoma-based power provider for northeast Oklahoma and southeast Missouri. He served as that organization's chief administrative officer and assistance chief executive officer.

Sherrer currently serves as assistant vice president for external relations in Oklahoma State University’s Division of Agricultural Sciences and Natural Resources. He also serves on the board of directors at Rural Enterprises of Oklahoma, Inc., a provider of economic development services to rural Oklahomans.

Political offices
Preceded by	Oklahoma state representative 1981–1989	Succeeded by
Preceded by	Oklahoma Secretary of Agriculture; Under Governor David Walters; 1989–1995	Succeeded by Dennis Howard
Preceded by	Oklahoma Commissioner of Agriculture; Under Governor David Walters; 1989–1995	Succeeded by Dennis Howard
Preceded by Patty Eaton	Oklahoma Secretary of the Environment; Under Governor Frank Keating; 1995–1997	Succeeded by Brian C. Griffin
Preceded by Patty Eaton	Executive Director of the Oklahoma Water Resources Board; Under Governor Frank Keating; 1995–1997	Succeeded by Duane Smith
Preceded by J.D. Strong	Oklahoma Secretary of the Environment; Under Governor Mary Fallin; January 14, 2011 – June 30, 2013	Succeeded by Post Abolished
