= Robert J. Sullivan Jr. =

American politician

Robert J. "Bob" Sullivan

Oklahoma Secretary of Energy
- In office 2002–2003
- Governor: Frank Keating
- Preceded by: Carl Michael Smith
- Succeeded by: David Fleischaker

Personal details
- Born: September 8, 1945 (age 81) Decatur, Illinois, USA
- Party: Republican
- Education: University of Michigan

Robert J. "Bob" Sullivan Jr. (born September 8, 1945) is an American politician from Oklahoma and a Republican candidate in the 2006 Oklahoma gubernatorial election. Sullivan had previously served as the Oklahoma Secretary of Energy under Governor of Oklahoma Frank Keating from 2002 to 2003.

Sullivan lost in the July 25, 2006 primary to U.S. Congressman Ernest Istook. He currently serves as the director of Unit Corporation in Tulsa, Oklahoma.

== Early life and career ==
Sullivan earned a bachelor's degree in finance from the University of Notre Dame and a master's in business administration from the University of Michigan. He runs the independent oil and gas exploration and production company, Sullivan & Company, where he and his father began working in 1976. It operates in three states, primarily in Oklahoma. In 1989, he started an energy-related company of his own, Lumen Energy Corporation, a natural gas gathering company that operated in two states. He served as the chief operation officer for the company until its sale in 2004.

Sullivan served as Chair of the Oklahoma Energy Resources Board, which focuses on education and environmental clean-up. Along with Michael Brunker, he received the 2002 Sigma Delta Chi national public service award.

== Keating administration ==
Sullivan was appointed Secretary of Energy by Governor Frank Keating in 2002. He continued in that position in an acting position under Governor Brad Henry until October 2003.

== Campaign for governor ==
Sullivan filed papers in his run for governor on June 6, 2006, and has positioned himself as the only "non-career politician" in the race. He ran ads featuring Gailard Sartain that attacked his opponents 'career politician' background. The Sartain ads on YouTube were seen as over the top and may of hurt his chances.

He led an effort to place an initiative petition on the November 2006 ballot that would have required 65 percent of money earmarked for education be spent in the classroom. He also suggested eliminating the state income tax and took a strong anti-abortion position.

He lost the July 25 primary to U.S. Congressman Ernest Istook. Sullivan received 56,347 votes or 30.94 percent to Istook's 99,650 votes or 54.71 percent.

== Personal life ==
Sullivan is married to Jeanne Sullivan. They have six children and seven grandchildren. He has served on the board of directors of Catholic Charities and the board of directors of St. John Medical Center.

Political offices
Preceded by Carl Michael Smith	Oklahoma Secretary of Energy; Under Governor Frank Keating; 2002 - 2003	Succeeded by David Fleischaker
