= Assistant Secretary of Energy for Fossil Energy =

Head of coal, oil and gas planning and research in the US Department of Energy

Assistant Secretary of Energy for Fossil Energy and Carbon Management of Office of Fossil Energy and Carbon Management
- Seal of the United States Department of Energy

- Flag of the United States Department of Energy
- United States Department of Energy
- Style: Assistant Secretary
- Reports to: Secretary of Energy
- Appointer: President of the United States; with United States Senate advice and consent
- Salary: $143,000 (2007)

The Assistant Secretary of Energy for Fossil Energy and Carbon Management is the head of the Office of Fossil Energy and Carbon Management within the United States Department of Energy. As of 2007, the Office of Fossil Energy and Carbon Management is responsible for several initiatives, including implementation of a $2 billion, 10-year initiative to develop a new generation of environmentally sound clean coal technologies, and the nation's Strategic Petroleum Reserve and Northeast Home Heating Oil Reserve. The Assistant Secretary manages about 1000 scientists, engineers, technicians and administrative staff.

The Assistant Secretary for Fossil Energy and Carbon Management is appointed by the President with the advice and consent of the Senate.

Former Assistant Secretaries by recency include Acting Assistant Secretary Jennifer Wilcox, Assistant Secretary Steven Winberg; Acting Assistant Secretary Douglas Hollett; Assistant Secretary Chris Smith; Assistant Secretary Chuck McConnell; Jeffrey D. Jarrett, Acting Assistant Secretary Mark R. Maddox, and Carl Michael Smith. There have been ten former Assistant Secretaries in total, excluding acting officers. The Assistant Secretary for Fossil Energy and Carbon Management is 15th in the order of succession for Secretary of Energy. The Assistant Secretary is paid at level IV of the Executive Schedule, receiving a basic annual salary of $143,000 as of 2007.
