= Mike Dunleavy =

Mike Dunleavy is the name of:

- Mike Dunleavy Sr. (born 1954), American former basketball coach, executive, and player
- Mike Dunleavy Jr. (born 1980), American basketball executive and former player
- Mike Dunleavy (politician) (born 1961), American educator and politician, current Governor of Alaska

See also

- Mike Dunlevy (born c. 1965), American college football coach.
