= Mary L. Easley =

American politician

Mary Easley
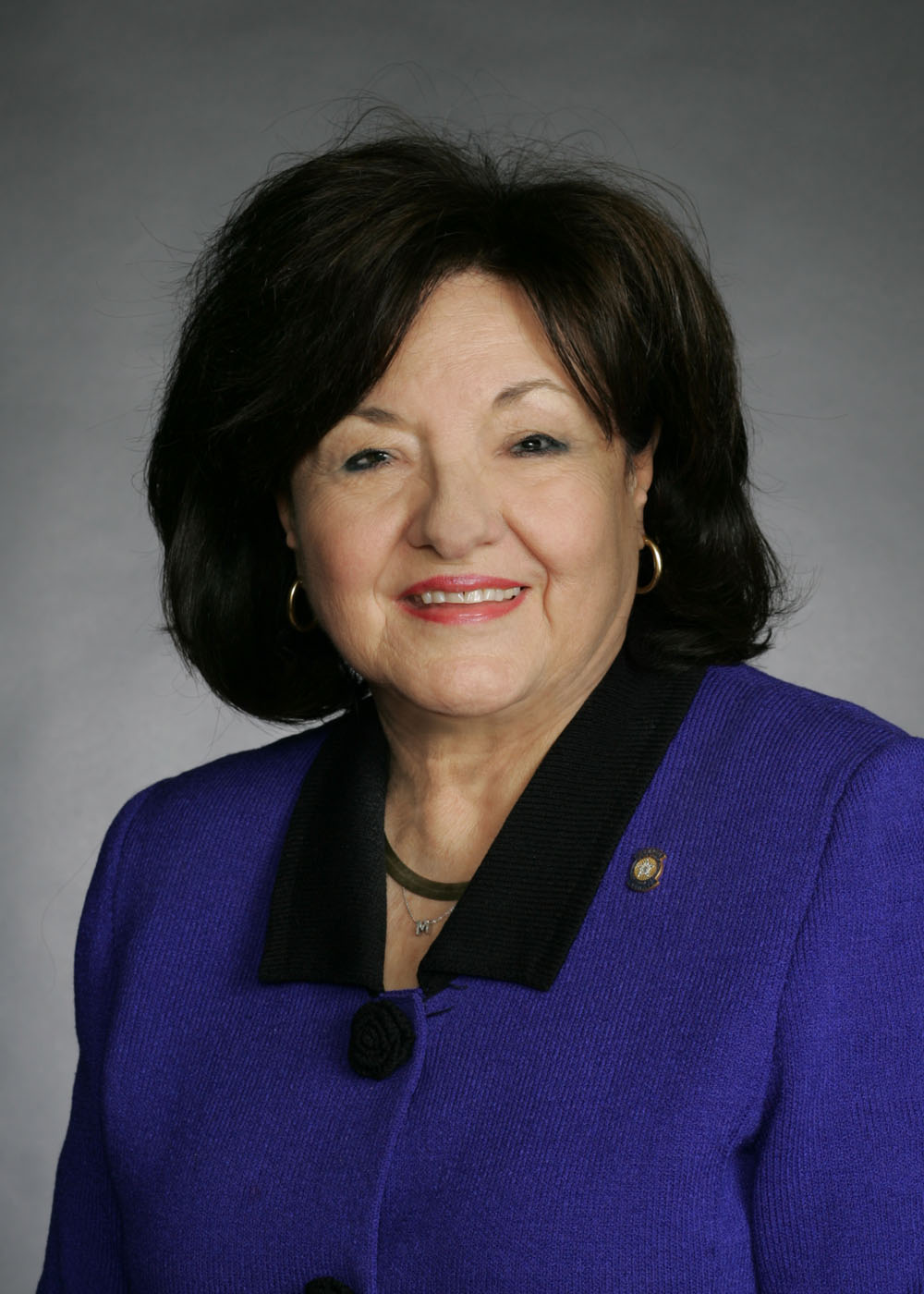

Member of the Oklahoma Senate from the 18th district
- In office 2004–2010
- Preceded by: Kevin Easley
- Succeeded by: Kim David

Member of the Oklahoma House of Representatives from the 78th district
- In office 1997–2004
- Preceded by: Flint Breckinridge
- Succeeded by: Jeannie McDaniel

Personal details
- Born: Cassville, Missouri, U.S.
- Party: Democratic
- Spouse: Truman Easley
- Children: Kevin Easley
- Education: Friends University; Oklahoma State University
- Profession: Teacher

Mary L. Easley served as the Oklahoma Senator representing District 18, which includes Mayes, Tulsa and Wagoner counties from her win in a special election in 2004 until 2010. She previously served in the Oklahoma House of Representatives from 1996 through 2004, representing District 78.

== Early life ==
Mary L. Easley was born in Cassville, Missouri, where her parents were farmers. She grew up around the majority of her extended family and has fond memories of being raised in rural Missouri. After high school, Easley attended Southwest Baptist University. She met her husband, Truman, and moved to Wichita, Kansas, with him for his job at Boeing Aircraft. Easley completed her undergraduate degree at Friends University as well as began to work on her master's. For about a year, she worked on her degree while teaching. After that year Easley went to Wichita State. Her first teaching position was in Valley Center, Kansas.

In 1967, the couple moved to Tulsa, Oklahoma. Easley began teaching in Owasso, Oklahoma and remained there for 24 more years. Easley taught English at Owasso High School.

== Oklahoma House of Representatives (1997-2004) ==
Toward the end of her teaching career, Easley's son Kevin was a state senator. This started to inspire Easley to become involved with politics in order to attempt to pass legislation that she was concerned about. Soon Easley decided to retire from education and begin campaigning. Her campaign slogan was the same one her son used: "Easley the Best Choice." Easley was elected to the Oklahoma House of Representatives in 1997. It was the first time that a mother and son served simultaneously, though Kevin was in the Senate at the time. She served until 2004, when she took her son Kevin's Oklahoma Senate seat.

=== Committees ===
- Banking chairman

== Oklahoma Senate (2004-2010) ==
Kevin decided to leave office to pursue a different career and convinced his mother, Mary Easley, to run for his vacated seat. Easley worked on passing several bills concerned with education during her terms in the Senate. She authored the Autism Insurance Bill, which did not pass. The bill would essentially help to provide insurance for families struggling with an autistic child. Easley was especially dedicated to bettering the education of children with disabilities.

=== Committees ===
- Education committee
- Vice-chair of the Energy committee
- Vice-chair of the Transportation committee
