= John Albaugh =

American politician

John Albaugh is the former chief of staff to American Republican Congressman Ernest Istook and was a cooperating witness in the Department of Justice investigation of Kevin Ring, a lobbyist and an associate of Jack Abramoff.

== Investigation ==
From 1993 through 2006, Albaugh was employed by U.S. Representative Ernest Istook, eventually becoming chief of staff for Istook in 1998. In the plea agreement, Albaugh admitted that from approximately March 2002 until approximately May 2004 he accepted campaign contributions, tickets to sporting events and meals from Kevin A. Ring, Greenberg Traurig and their clients, in exchange for agreeing to take and taking official action on their behalf. The documents also document that Istook called Abramoff in 2003, to thank him in advance for use of one of Abramoff's suites at FedEx Field in Landover, Md., for a fundraising event. During the call, Istook asked Abramoff which projects his clients wanted in the upcoming transportation bill. The documents refer to an e-mail Abramoff sent to his lobby colleagues saying Istook "had basically asked what we want in the transportation bill" and instructing the lobbyists to "make sure we load up our entire Christmas list."

== Plea agreement ==
In June 2008 Albaugh pleaded guilty to conspiracy with Kevin Ring. As part of his plea agreement Albaugh wore a wire during a conversation with former Congressman Istook, testified for three days during trial, and provided other assistance to the government. However, Albaugh's plea agreement fell apart when he informed the government that his actions were motivated by campaign contributions provided by Kevin Ring to Congressman Istook, and not by tickets to sporting events or meals provided by Ring to Albaugh.

As a result of breaking his plea agreement the government requested Judge Ellen Segal Huvelle to sentence Albaugh to 27 months in prison. Judge Huvelle, however, rejected that request and instead sentenced Albaugh to four months in a half-way house citing his cooperation with the government investigation and saying "There are three or four Congressman out there that will never see the light of day for their actions, and we're blaming the staffers,". Huvelle declined to fine Albaugh or require him to perform community service because of his work with a non-profit organization which operates schools and medical clinics in Afghanistan saying that it was unnecessary.

== Retirement ==
Albaugh resides in Colorado Springs where he founded a nonprofit, Levi’s House, to help “ex-cons re-entering society” and serves on the board of several non-profits. His curriculum, Work: What’s It Good For?, is used by several ministries toward that end. He was the recipient of the 2008 Father of the Year award for Beaufort County, South Carolina.
