= Jeff Starling =

American politician

Oklahoma Secretary of Energy and Environment
- Incumbent
- Assumed office December 3, 2024
- Governor: Kevin Stitt
- Preceded by: Ken McQueen

Personal details
- Born: August 4, 1974 (age 51) Danville, Virginia, U.S.
- Party: Republican
- Education: Wake Forest University (BA, JD)

Jeff Starling (born August 4, 1974) is an American attorney and businessman who has served as the Oklahoma Secretary of Energy and Environment in the administration of Governor Kevin Stitt since 2024. A member of the Republican Party, Starling has experience in law, business, and public service.

== Early life and education ==
Starling was raised in Danville, Virginia. He earned his Bachelor's degree in 1996 and his Juris Doctor in 2003 from Wake Forest University. Following his undergrad, Starling worked as a legislative aide to U.S. Senator John Warner of Virginia.

== Career ==
After law school, Starling clerked for U.S. District Court Judge Samuel Grayson Wilson.

In 2004, Starling joined McGuireWoods, an international law firm, where he served as an associate and later as a partner for eight years. He represented clients in various industries including agricultural and energy producers, manufacturers, and Fortune 500 companies. In 2011, Starling was recognized as a “Rising Star” by Virginia Super Lawyers magazine.

In 2012, Starling and his family moved to Oklahoma. He joined Devon Energy, where he served as assistant general counsel and senior counsel. In 2019, he joined the senior management team of Lagoon Water Midstream, which had operations in Oklahoma and Texas. Lagoon was acquired by Deep Blue in 2024.

In 2020, Starling was appointed Chair of the Republican Senatorial Committee (RSC), which supports Republican candidates for the Oklahoma State Senate. He guided the organization through an ethics investigation concerning impermissible contributions that predated his tenure.

== Oklahoma Secretary of Energy and Environment ==
Starling was appointed Oklahoma Secretary of Energy and Environment by Governor Kevin Stitt on December 3, 2024, replacing Ken McQueen. Starling has advocated for eliminating green energy subsidies and for promoting the development of Oklahoma’s natural resources to strengthen domestic energy production.

In June 2025, Jeff Starling and U.S. Representative Josh Brecheen co-authored a national editorial in The Washington Examiner criticizing federal green energy subsidies and urging Congress to end them.

Beginning in 2014, Starling served as an advisor to the State Chamber of Oklahoma where he led legal and labor reform efforts, including tort reform. In 2024, he was appointed to the Oklahoma Task Force for the Study of Business Courts, where he supported the establishment of business courts in Oklahoma. In an editorial in The Oklahoman, Starling stated these courts would “streamline litigation and reduce the time it takes to resolve disputes,” thereby saving “businesses time and money.”

== 2026 attorney general campaign ==
On July 1, 2025, Starling launched his campaign for Oklahoma Attorney General, describing himself as a political outsider focused on protecting the state’s “rule of law” and “way of life.”

In an editorial published in The Journal Record, Starling stated one of his objectives as Attorney General would be to “open Oklahoma for business” by modernizing the state’s legal system, reducing regulatory barriers, and addressing public safety. In an interview with The Daily Ardmoreite, Starling outlined additional priorities, including combating the spread of fentanyl, addressing foreign criminal influences such as illegal marijuana grow operations in rural areas, and maintaining the political independence of the Attorney General’s office by focusing on anti-corruption measures and taxpayer protection.

Since launching his campaign in July 2025, Starling has reported raising a record amount for an Oklahoma Attorney General candidate, citing broad support from individuals across the state.
