= Jeffrey D. Jarrett =

American coal and oil executive, mineralogist, and former government official

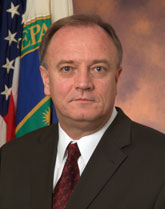
Assistant Secretary Jeffrey Jarrett

Jeffrey D. Jarrett was the Assistant Secretary for Fossil Energy within the United States Department of Energy, from his swearing in on January 3, 2006 until March 2007. Until his appointment to the position, he had served as director of the Department of the Interior's Office of Surface Mining. He was sworn into that position on February 12, 2002. In March 2007, the Coal-Based Generation Stakeholders announced Jeffrey Jarrett would join them as its executive director.

When President Bush appointed Jeffrey Jarrett as Director of the Office of Surface Mining, he was the Deputy Secretary for Mineral Resources Management of the Pennsylvania Department of Environmental Protection. Jarrett was at the time responsible for the Department's regulatory programs for surface and underground coal and industrial minerals mining, oil and gas exploration, deep mine safety, and abandoned mine lands reclamation.

From 1988 to 1994, he had been the Deputy Assistant Director for the Office of Surface Mining in Pittsburgh, Pennsylvania. He has also served as the deputy assistant director of the Office of Surface Mining. He previously served as director of planning, division manager, and reclamation director for the Cravat Coal Company and as reclamation supervisor for The Drummond Company.

Jeffrey Jarret graduated from Geneva College in Pennsylvania with a Bachelor of Science degree in Human Resource Management. He graduated from Belmont Technical College in St. Clairsville, Ohio with an A.A.S degree in Land Stabilization and Reclamation. He is a native of West Virginia.

Government offices
Preceded by Mark R. Maddox (acting)	Assistant Secretary for Fossil Energy; 2006–2007	Succeeded by Thomas D. Shope (acting)
