= Interstate Oil and Gas Compact Commission =

Organization in the United States

- Abbreviation: IOGCC
- Formation: 1935
- Type: Interstate compact
- Purpose: Promote efficient harvesting of oil and gas while protecting health, safety, and the environment.
- Headquarters: Oklahoma City
- Region served: United States
- 2026 Chairman: Mike Dunleavy, Governor of Alaska,
- Vice-Chair: Mick Thomas, Utah Department of Natural Resources
- Website: https://oklahoma.gov/iogcc.html
- Formerly called: Interstate Oil Compact Commission

The Interstate Oil and Gas Compact Commission (IOGCC), formerly the Interstate Oil Compact Commission, is a United States organization representing the governors of 31 member states, seven associate states, and ten international affiliates that works to ensure the nation's oil and natural gas resources are conserved and utilized to their maximum potential while protecting health, safety and the environment.

== Background ==
In the early days of oil exploration, drilling was governed by the law of capture, which states that the owner of land on which a well resides has the right to any oil from that well even if it was drained from the land of his neighbors. This provided an incentive for each landowner to extract the oil as fast as possible. Each state tried to regulate its own oil by such measures as proration, the limiting of production to some fraction of capacity; but then two great oil fields, the Oklahoma City Oil Field and the East Texas Oil Field, were discovered. This, along with the Great Depression, led to significant waste and very low prices, with catastrophic effects on the industry. The problems were large enough that the states recognized the need for cooperation.

While the National Guard occupied wells in Oklahoma and Texas in 1931–1932, an Oil States Advisory Committee drafted the Thomas-McKeon Bill, which proposed an interstate oil compact and a Federal Interstate Oil Board to recommend quotas. However, the bill was abandoned after oil industry representatives withdrew their support. From 1933 to 1935, oil was regulated under the National Industrial Recovery Act and the Petroleum Code, which in effect left production control in the hands of industry representatives, with no representation for the states. The Supreme Court found these regulations unconstitutional in 1935, and the idea of an interstate compact was revived.

=== The Compact ===
On December 3, 1934, Oklahoma Governor-elect E. W. Marland met with the governors of Kansas and Texas to discuss an interstate compact. According to founding Commissioner, Texas Governor James V Allred, the idea for the interstate compact originated with the American Petroleum Institute. This meeting led to the drafting of the Interstate Compact to Conserve Oil and Gas, which Congress ratified on August 27, 1935. At first, Congress ratified it for only two years at a time, then four years, and finally the compact was made permanent in 1979.

The stated purpose of the compact was to "conserve oil and gas by the prevention of physical waste thereof from any cause". States that ratified the compact agreed to enact legislation for this purpose. Article VI of the compact constituted "The Interstate Oil Compact Commission," renamed as the Interstate Oil and Gas Compact Commission in 1991, and its duty was to make recommendations for preventing the physical waste of gas and oil. The interstate compact was seen as an alternative to direct federal regulation that would allow oil producing states to retain more control. Relative to other interstate compacts, this one—described as "brief and general"—was not a regulatory compact.. Its popularity and success were attributed to this general nature, with the commission serving as a forum for sharing best practices and the compact giving member states the freedom to adopt them. However, the federal regulations on interstate oil commerce of the Connally Hot Oil Act provided important context for the compact.

Some economic historians have described the regulation of oil output under the compact as an example of a price fixing cartel. The production controls of the IOGCC and the Texas Railroad Commission have been cited as precursors to the establishment of OPEC's caps on member state oil production.

== Organizational structure ==
Member states Associate states

Initially the commission had six members: Colorado, Illinois, Kansas, New Mexico, Oklahoma and Texas. It now has 31 member states, 7 non-oil-producing associate states, and 10 international affiliates (including 7 Canadian provinces and territories). Georgia became the first associate member in 1946. The governor of each member state appoints an official representative who can vote on policy recommendations, and any number of associate representatives who can vote in their place if the official representative is not available. The list of members can be found on the IOGCC website. Many representatives are state regulators overseeing gas and drilling, but as of 2010 at least seven were industry executives and lobbyists. Influential members during the commission's early years include Ernest O. Thompson, Warwick M. Downing, Hiram M. Dow, and Executive Secretary Earl Foster.

The commission meets biannually, but much of its work occurs in small committee meetings throughout the year. To govern operations, it has steering, finance, resolutions, and nominating committees. Other committees are Energy Resources, Research and Technology, Environment and Safety, International, Public Lands, Public Outreach, and State Review.

=== Transparency and accountability ===
Several bylaws govern the IOGCC. The compact did not provide for any resources to support IOGCC; a later bylaw stipulated that its expenses would be paid "from voluntary contributions from the member states and other sources of revenue approved by the Commission". These sources, including federal grants, have been sufficient to allow the commission to function. IOGCC uses an Oklahoma government email address and domain but it is not a state, not a federal agency and does not have to register to lobby the federal government. A plethora of information is available, but relatively little of it has come directly from the organization itself. In its early years, the commission's meetings were praised for their openness. The Commission's origin in an interstate compact exempts it from disclosure rules that would otherwise apply to lobbying activities. IOGCC now claims an exemption from the Open Public Records Act and has removed a provision within its bylaws that formerly said its records are open to the public.

== Activities ==
To identify best practices, IOGCC surveys member states and assesses their activities. It catalogues innovative programs, shares this information with states, and hosts biannual meetings that bring together representatives from government, the oil industry, and environmentalists.

=== Policy ===
IOGCC is an advocate for states' rights, arguing that state regulation is more effective than "one size fits all" federal regulation. As well as creating reports, it creates model statutes as a guide for legislation by states. From 1935 to at least 1957, the commission's legal committee was credited with leading development of [oil and gas] conservation law in the United States. In 1978, the Department of Justice called for the commission to be disbanded because of the extent to which its activities had shifted toward advocacy.

Issues that IOGCC has worked on include national energy policy, carbon sequestration, environmental stewardship, hydraulic fracturing ("fracking") and produced water. In 2005, the organization claimed credit for the so-called Halliburton Loophole, which exempted hydraulic fracturing from the Energy Policy Act.

=== Price fixing ===
In the 1930s and 1940s, the commission functioned as a price fixing cartel. According to the legal scholar Blakely Murphy, the commission operated under the guise of resource conservation but primarily existed to protect the interests of oil producers.

=== Carbon sequestration ===
A large part of the human contribution to global warming is from the emission of carbon dioxide (CO_{2}) as a result of burning fossil fuels. One way to reduce the contribution is to capture the CO_{2} before it enters the atmosphere and sequester it by injecting it underground in depleted oil and natural gas fields, saline formations and coal beds. Recognizing that the oil and gas industry has a lot of experience with injecting CO_{2} into the ground for enhanced oil recovery, the IOGCC launched the Geological CO_{2} Sequestration Task Force in 2002 to investigate the issues surrounding sequestration. A two-phase study was funded by the Department of Energy. Phase I concluded that the states had the knowledge and experience to regulate sequestration safely. In phase II, which began in 2006, the task force prepared a report that included a model statute for the states, with explanations on how to implement it.

=== Public relations and publications ===
The commission also engages in extensive public relations efforts. Publications include Compact Comments, The Oil and Gas Compact Bulletin, and numerous technical reports.

=== Groundwater Protection Council ===
In 1983, the commission created the 501(c)(6) nonprofit Groundwater Protection Council. The IOGCC has gone on to partner with the Council on initiatives such as FracFocus, a registry for reporting chemicals used during hydraulic fracturing, and the StatesFirst Initiative, focused on information sharing and technology adoption.

=== Awards ===
The IOGCC confers three awards:

- The E.W. Marland Award, established in 1994, recognizes an outstanding state legislator.
- The Warwick Downing Award, established in 2005, recognizes an individual outside state governments who has made an outstanding contribution to the IOGCC.
- The highest honor, established in 2001, is the Chairman's Stewardship Award for exemplary efforts in environmental stewardship. This award has four categories: Environmental Partnership (for partnerships with industry led by non-industry organizations); Energy Education; Small Company and Large Company.
