= Oklahoma Department of Mines =

- Great Seal of Oklahoma

Agency overview
- Formed: November 16, 1907
- Headquarters: 2915 N Classen Blvd; Oklahoma City
- Employees: 21 unclassified
- Annual budget: $3 million
- Ministers responsible: Jeff Starling, Secretary of Energy & Environment; Kurt Klutts, Chairman, Oklahoma Mining Commission
- Agency executive: Suzen M. Rodesney, Director
- Parent agency: Oklahoma Mining Commission
- Website: Oklahoma Department of Mines

The Oklahoma Department of Mines (ODOM) is a department of the government of Oklahoma responsible for overseeing and regulating all surface and sub-surface mining activities in the State. The department is also responsible for the reclamation of land disturbed by mining operations. The department regulates the production of coal and non-fuel minerals in the State.

The department is under the control of the Mining Commission. The commission is a nine-member board that serves as the governing body of the department and is responsible for approving the Department's budget, establishing policy and appointing the Director of the department, who serves as the chief administrative officer of the department. The current Director of the Mining Department is Suzen M. Rodesney, who was appointed by the Commission in 2023.

The Department of Mines was established in 1907 during the term of Governor of Oklahoma Charles Haskell.

== Mining Commission ==
The Oklahoma Legislature abolished the State Mining Board and replaced it with the Oklahoma Mining Commission in 1985. The commission is a nine-member board that serves as the governing body of the department and is responsible for approving the Department's budget, establishing policy and appointing the Director of the department. The members of the commission are appointed by the Governor of Oklahoma with the approval of the Oklahoma Senate. All members serve seven-year staggered terms. The membership of the Commission consists of one person with experience in each of the following fields: engineering or geology, labor or worker's safety, agriculture or soil conservation, transportation, economic development or banking, public utilities, natural resources, and two persons selected at large.

== Organization ==
- Mining Commission
  - Director
    - Administration Division
    - Coal Division
      - Technical Services Section
      - Permitting Section
      - Inspection and Enforcement Section
    - Mineral Division
      - Non-Coal Mining Section
      - Coal Combustion Byproducts Section
      - Non-Mining Blasting Section
    - Miner Training Institute

== See also ==
- Oklahoma Corporation Commission
- Oklahoma Energy Resources Board
