= North American Membrane Society =

- Formation: 1985
- Location: United States of America
- Members: 500+
- President: Lucy Mar Camacho (President)
- Key people: Zachary Smith (Vice-President); Christina Carbrello (Treasurer); Ryan Lively (Secretary)
- Website: www.membranes.org

The North American Membrane Society (NAMS) is a scientific society based in the United States which promotes inquiry in the field of membrane science. NAMS is a 501(c)3 non-profit organization. It holds an annual national meeting featuring seminars by prominent membrane scientists, engineers, and industry professionals. NAMS also provides support to membrane scientists and students through its awards program, in the form of fellowships and travel awards.

== Meetings ==
NAMS hosts national meetings in rotating locations in the United States. The 32nd National Meeting was held in 2016 in Tempe, Arizona, while the 41st National Meeting was held in Nashville, Tennessee.

== Membrane Quarterly ==
NAMS publishes Membrane Quarterly, a publication edited at Georgia Tech, which showcases news and research in the field of membrane science.

== See also ==
- Membrane
- Polymer Chemistry
