= Oklahoma Water Resources Board =

- Water Resources Board logo

Agency overview
- Formed: 1957
- Headquarters: 3800 Classen Boulevard Oklahoma City, Oklahoma
- Employees: 76 classified 29 unclassified
- Annual budget: $53 million
- Ministers responsible: Michael Teague, Secretary of Energy & Environment; Linda Lambert, Chair of the Board
- Agency executive: Julie Cunningham, Executive Director
- Website: www.owrb.ok.gov

The Oklahoma Water Resources Board (OWRB) is an agency in the government of Oklahoma under the Governor of Oklahoma. OWRB is responsible for managing and protection the water resources of Oklahoma as well as for planning for the state's long-range water needs. The Board is composed of nine members appointed by the Governor with the consent of the Oklahoma Senate. The Board, in turn, appoints an Executive Director to administer the agency.

== Leadership ==
The Water Resources Board is overseen by the Secretary of Energy and Environment. Under Governor Mary Fallin, Michael Teague is serving as the Secretary.

== Oklahoma Water Rights ==
Oklahoma has a unique set of water rights statues based on groundwater and streamwater. The owner of land owns the groundwater underlying such land and surface water standing on the land, however the Oklahoma Water Resources Board regulates non-domestic use. Stream water is considered to be publicly owned and subject to appropriation by the Oklahoma Water Resources Board.

=== Streamwater ===
In Oklahoma, streamwater is defined to include “water in ponds, lakes, reservoirs, and playa lakes” (or dry lakes). Streamwater is considered to be publicly owned; the Oklahoma Water Resources board is responsible for appropriation for all areas of the State of Oklahoma except the Grand River basin, where the Grand River Dam Authority (GRDA) has responsibility for allocation on a use-it or lose-it basis.

=== Groundwater ===
Groundwater is considered a property right in Oklahoma, and defined as “fresh water (less than 5,000 parts per million total dissolved solids) under the surface of the earth regardless of geologic structure in which it is standing or moving outside the cut bank of any definite stream” Oklahoma Water Resources Board permits the withdrawal of groundwater on a use-it or lose-it basis.

The Oklahoma Corporation Commission has jurisdiction over taking, using or disposal of salt water associated with the exploration, production or recovery of oil and gas or to the taking, using or disposal of water trapped in producing mines.

=== Domestic Use ===
The Domestic Use of either Groundwater or Streamwater is exempt from permitting. Domestic use is defined as being use by individuals “for household purposes, lawns, orchards, and cattle watering up to the normal grazing capacity, plus use of up to 5 acre-feed per year for agricultural my natural individuals, firefighting, and use by non-individuals for drinking water, restrooms, and lawn watering.

=== Federal Authority ===
The U.S. Constitution’s Commerce Clause (Article I, Section 8, Clause 3) gives the Federal Government the authority to regulate commerce among the States. This power impacts water used in Oklahoma for both navigation and for generating hydropower.

However, a federal appeals court ruled on whether the Oklahoma laws violate the Commerce Clause. The finding was that the laws do not violate the clause.

Texas—Oklahoma laws favoring in-state applicants for water permits were authorized by Congress when it approved an interstate water compact, a federal appeals court has ruled (Tarrant Regional Water District v. Herrmann, 10th Cir., No. 10-6184, 9/7/11). Because the Red River Compact, (which apportions rights to water from the Red River among Oklahoma, Texas, Arkansas, and Louisiana) was approved by Congress, the Oklahoma statutes did not violate the “dormant” commerce clause, the U.S. Court of Appeals for the Tenth Circuit concluded in its decision of September 7, 2011.

The dormant commerce clause refers to previous judicial interpretations that states cannot limit interstate commerce even in matters in which Congress has not acted. By approving the compact, which the court said “explicitly defers to and recognizes plenary state authority over water use,” Congress gave the states “broad regulatory authority” in “unqualified terms,” allowing Oklahoma to put restrictions on interstate water transactions.

The court also rejected claims by the Tarrant Regional Water District, an agency that provides water in north central Texas, that specific language in the compact intended to ensure that downstream states receive their fair share of water in dry years did not preempt the Oklahoma laws. It affirmed a lower court ruling.

This ruling would be definitively affirmed in a unanimous opinion by Justice Sonia Sotomayor for the Supreme Court on June 13, 2013 in Tarrant Regional Water Dist. v. Herrmann, 569 U.S. 614.

==== Navigation ====
Because waterways are used to transport goods among the States, while States may claim ownership of the beds of rivers based on the Equal footing doctrine, the Commerce clause established a “Navigable servitude” on all lands and on all state-created water rights allowing Congress to enact laws that have the effect of overriding state laws on water use. This “navigation servitude” is described to exist on lands and water up to the “ordinary high water mark” of streams that are navigable.

==== Hydropower ====
The Commerce Clause of the U.S. Constitution has also been interpreted to allow Congress to regulate water used for Hydropower purposes and a state can not refuse to block a hydro-project by refusing to issue a water permit, with the exception being through the Section 401 of the Clean Water Act. -- a state may withhold a water quality certification for the federal hydropower license.

==== Native American rights ====
In 2010, Oklahoma City, represented by the Oklahoma City Water Utilities Trust (OUT) sought to purchase rights to a large quantities of water from Sardis Lake. OUT successfully negotiated approval of this purchase from the OWRB. Many residents in Pushmataha and Latimer Counties, where Sardis Lake is located, objected for various reasons. These two counties had previously been part of the Choctaw Nation when the present state of Oklahoma had been part of Indian Territory. The Choctaws claim that the United States had granted them authority over water resources in their land in the 1830 Treaty of Dancing Rabbit Creek, prior to the enforced emigration from their ancestral homeland to Indian Territory. The national governments of the Five Civilized Tribes had been extinguished immediately prior to Oklahoma statehood in 1907. State officials claim that treaties signed by the tribes after the Civil War relinquished tribal rights, and therefore they can no longer make such claims. The state had simply ignored the former nations in negotiating water rights since statehood. In order to halt the execution of the Sardis Lake agreement, the Chickasaws filed suit in 2011. (Note: The case is formally known as Chickasaw Nation vs. Fallin 2011 WL 3629363 (W.D. Okla Aug 18), 2011) (No. CIV-11-927-C). Informally, it has been called Chickasaw v. Fallin and the "Chickasaw Nation complaint." The defendant, Mary Fallin, is the Governor of Oklahoma.) An article published in the Tulsa Law Review describes the potential legal ramifications for this case:

"If the Chickasaw and Choctaw Nations successfully obtain either full or substantial rights to the waters in Sardis Reservoir, other federally-recognized tribes that have water rights not yet formally recognized may have the footing needed to seek legal protection of those rights. If Oklahoma wins this case... tribal water rights could be severely impaired and the future social and economic wealth of all the tribes in the state could be jeopardized, beginning with the Choctaw and Chickasaw."

== Interstate Stream Compacts ==
The entire state of Oklahoma is covered by four separate interstate compacts concerning all surface water that flows into or out of the state. These interstate compacts are agreements written by impacted states and approved by the United States Congress. The compacts are the equivalent to treaties between the states in that the rules and regulations of a Compact Commission (the administrative agency set up to administer the agreements) have the full impact of federal law.

Commission Name	Signatory States	Date Implemented	Website
Arkansas-Oklahoma Arkansas River Compact Commission	Arkansas, Oklahoma	1972	web site
Canadian River Compact Commission	New Mexico, Oklahoma, Texas	(345, 82d Congress, 2d session) approved June 2, 1952	web site
Kansas-Oklahoma Arkansas River Compact Commission	Kansas, Oklahoma	1966	web site
Red River Compact Commission	Arkansas, Louisiana, Oklahoma, Texas	1978	web site

== Arkansas Riverbed Authority ==
As the result of a Supreme Court Decision, it was decided that three of the tribes of Indian Territory were the owners of a portion of the Arkansas River bed. The Arkansas Riverbed Authority is an entity created jointly by the Chickasaw, Choctaw and Cherokee Nations to administer the tribally owned stretch of the Arkansas River between Muskogee Oklahoma, and Ft. Smith, Arkansas. To settle pending damage claims, the Congress passed the Cherokee, Choctaw, and Chickasaw Nations Claims Settlement Act,

While the original Supreme Court Decision dealt with mineral rights under the river bed, aspects of the case may impact water rights in the State of Oklahoma.

== History ==
Created in 1957, the nine-member Board is composed of one member from each of five congressional districts, with the remaining members-at-large. Members serve seven-year terms. Members represent recreational, industrial, irrigation, municipal, agricultural, soil conservation, and rural residential water uses. The Board administers financial assistance programs to fund eligible public water supply and wastewater treatment projects and improvements. The Board also administers water use permits, the water well drillers licensing program, dam safety, floodplain management programs, the Clean Lakes program, and promulgates state water quality standards.

== Organization ==
- Water Resources Board
  - Executive Director
    - Administrative Services Division – direct staff of the Executive Director, responsible for supporting the Board and providing agency-wide support services
      - General Counsel Section
      - Fiscal Services Section
      - Human Resources Section
      - Legislative and Media Relations Section
      - Information Services Section
    - Financial Assistance Division – responsible for providing loan and emergency grant programs to local governments to fund the construction or rehabilitation of community water and wastewater projects
    - Planning and Management Division – responsible for issuing permits for the use of the surface waters and groundwaters, dam safety programs, and floodplain management
      - Permitting Section
      - Technical Studies Section
      - Planning Section
    - Water Quality Division – responsible for collecting physical, chemical and biological data to protect the public health and safety
      - Standards Section
      - Monitoring Section
      - Lakes and Special Studies Section

== Staffing ==
The Water Resources Board, with an annual budget of about $20 million, is one of the smaller employers of the State. For fiscal year 2011, the Board was authorized 101 full-time employees.

Division	Number of Employees
Administration Division	23
Water Quality Division	34
Financial Assistance Division	21
Planning and Management Division	23
Total	101

== See also ==
- Oklahoma Department of Environmental Quality
- Oklahoma Water Resources Board website
- Map of Oklahoma’s Interstate Stream Compact Areas
- Oklahoma Comprehensive Water Plan 2012 Update - Water Supply Permit Availability Report
