= Oklahoma Department of Environmental Quality =

- Department of Environmental Quality logo

Agency overview
- Formed: January 1, 1993
- Headquarters: 707 N Robinson; Oklahoma City, Oklahoma
- Employees: 482 classified 76 unclassified
- Annual budget: $59.3 million
- Ministers responsible: Gary Sherrer, Secretary of the Environment; Jennifer Galvin, Chair of the Board
- Agency executives: Rob Singletary, Executive Director; Madison Miller, Deputy Executive Director
- Parent agency: Oklahoma Environmental Quality Board
- Website: www.deq.ok.gov

The Oklahoma Department of Environmental Quality (DEQ) is a department of the government of Oklahoma under the Governor of Oklahoma. It is responsible for protecting human health and for safeguarding the natural environment: air, water, and land. DEQ is chiefly responsible for the environmental policy of Oklahoma. It is governed by a thirteen member Environmental Quality Board appointed by the Governor, which in turn appoints an Executive Director to administer the department.

The department was created in 1993 during the term of Governor David Walters.

== Leadership ==
The department was administered by the secretary of the Environment. Since 2013, the department has been administered by the Office of Secretary of Energy and Environment. Under Governor Kevin Stitt, Kenneth Wagner serves as the secretary of Energy and Environment.

=== State Environmental Quality Board ===
The governing body of the department is the State Environmental Quality Board, which is composed of thirteen members appointed by the governor with the consent of the Oklahoma Senate. The membership of the Board must be composed of the following:

- One member must be a certified or registered environmental professional.
- One member must be selected from manufacturing industry executives within the state.
- One member must be selected from the hazardous waste industry executives within the state.
- One member must be selected from the solid waste industry executives within this state.
- One member must be well versed in recreational, irrigational, municipal or residential water usage.
- One member must be selected from among the petroleum industries being regulated by the Department of Environmental Quality.
- One member must be selected from the agriculture industries regulated by the Department of Environmental Quality.
- One member must be selected from the conservation districts of the state.
- Three members must be members of any statewide nonprofit environmental organizations.
- One member must be a member of a governing body of a city or town in the state.
- One member must be from a rural water district.

All members serve renewable five-year terms.

== Organization ==
The department is divided into six major divisions, each headed by a division director.

- Environmental Quality Board
  - Executive Director
    - Deputy Executive Director
      - Administrative Services Division - responsible for providing overall department leadership including human resources, finance, and central records.
      - Air Quality Division - responsible for implementing the state and federal Clean Air Acts. These laws lay out requirements and strategies for reducing emissions and improving air quality in Oklahoma in order to protect public health and the environment.
      - Environmental Complaints and Local Services Division - responsible for bringing the environmental programs of the DEQ to the local level and has some role in nearly all of the programs administered by the DEQ. They provide regulatory inspections and technical assistance for all facilities with a DEQ permit. Manages on-site sewage program including soil tests, design of systems, inspection of system installations and regulatory oversight of certified installers and septage pumpers and haulers. Responds to all citizen complaints regarding environmental pollution.
      - Water Quality Division - responsible for maintaining clean water for Oklahoma by regulating facilities that produce and distribute public drinking water and that treat, transport, store, and discharge wastewater. Also responsible—in cooperation with other state agencies—for maintaining water quality standards in Oklahoma's lakes, rivers, and streams.
      - Land Protection Division - responsible for inspection and permitting hazardous waste and solid waste treatment, storage and disposal facilities, permits and inspects certain underground injection wells, manages radioactive materials, restores contaminated land to safe and useful conditions (Brownfields, Superfund, Voluntary Cleanup, Land Restoration and Site Cleanup Assistance Program).
      - State Environmental Laboratory Services Division - responsible for supporting customers inside and outside DEQ. Provides help by answering questions about programs for air, water and solid or hazardous waste. The organic and inorganic laboratories provide analytical support to various programs within DEQ, to other state agencies, to the state's 1,700 public water supply systems and to citizens who request services.

== Budget and staffing ==
The Department of Environmental Quality, with an annual budget of over $70 million, is one of the larger employers of the state. For fiscal year 2014, the department was authorized 548 full-time employees.

Division	Number of employees	Budget (in millions)
Administration Division	64	$11.6
Customer Service Division	58	$6.9
Environmental Complaints and Local Services Division	97	$8.7
Air Quality Division	124	$13.1
Water Quality Division	118	$12
Land Protection Division	87	$20.9
Total	548	$73.2
