= Oklahoma Secretary of the Environment =

Oklahoma Secretary of Environment
- Seal of the Secretary of Environment

Agency overview
- Formed: July 1, 1993
- Headquarters: 3800 N. Classen Boulevard; Oklahoma City, Oklahoma
- Employees: 981.9 (FY2012)
- Annual budget: $590 million (FY2012)
- Minister responsible: Gary Sherrer, Secretary of the Environment
- Child agencies: Department of Environmental Quality; Department of Wildlife Conservation; Water Resources Board
- Website: Office of the Secretary of the Environment

The Oklahoma Secretary of Environment is a member of the Oklahoma Governor's Cabinet. The Secretary is appointed by the Governor, with the consent of the Oklahoma Senate, to serve at the pleasure of the Governor. The Secretary serves as the chief advisor to the Governor on environmental policy development and implementation.

The last Secretary was Gary Sherrer, who was appointed by Governor Mary Fallin on January 14, 2011.

The current Secretary of the successor office, the Office of the Secretary of Energy and Environment, is Michael Teague.

== History ==
The Office of the Secretary of Environment was established in 1993 to provide greater oversight to the environmental activities of the State government. The Office was established, along with the Oklahoma Department of Environmental Quality, by the Oklahoma Environmental Quality Act of 1993. The Act directed the Secretary of Environment ensure that state environmental agencies management activities are well coordinated and of high quality.

The offices of the Office of the Secretary of Energy and the Office of the Secretary of the Environment were merged in 2013, creating the Office of the Secretary of Energy and Environment.

== Responsibilities ==
The Secretary of Environment is responsible for overseeing the development, management and protection of the natural resources and wildlife of the State. The primary duties assigned to the Secretary by law are as follows:

- Any duties and powers assigned by the Governor
- Recipient and administrator of Federal Clean Water Act funds
- Coordinate pollution control activities to avoid duplication of effort
- Act on behalf of the public as trustee for natural resources
- Serve as the State's Trustee for Natural Resources

As the State's official Trustee for Natural Resources, the Secretary ensures that natural resources and the services they provide that are injured or lost because of contamination are restored for the benefit of the State.

As of fiscal year 2012, the Secretary of Environment oversees 981.9 full-time employees and is responsible for an annual budget of $590 million.

== Office of Secretary ==
The Secretary heads the Office of the Secretary of Environment, which is a state agency. The Mission Statement of the Office is:

The Environmental Mission of the State of Oklahoma, as adopted by the state's environmental agencies, is to protect and enhance Oklahoma's environment and natural resources through preservation, conservation, restoration, education and enforcement in order to maintain and improve the environmental quality and natural beauty of our state and better the standard of living for all Oklahomans.

=== Staff ===
The staff of the Office serves as the immediate staff to the Secretary. Although well funded, the Office has a very limited staff: only four full-time employees including the Secretary. As of 2012, the following are the authorized positions within the Office:

- Secretary of Environment
- Director of the Office of the Secretary of Environment
- Special Assistant to the Secretary
- Environmental Grants Manager

=== Budget ===
The Office of the Secretary has a very large budget for the size of its staff. For Fiscal Year 2013, with only 4 employees, the Office has an annual budget of $12 million. Less than $350 thousand of that budget is actually dedicated to employee compensation and operating expenses. The remaining $11.65 million (or 95%) of the budget is used as grants for State and local agencies with environmental responsibilities.

The vast majority of the funds to support the Office comes from the Environmental Protection Agency, particularly under the authority of the Clean Water Act. Only 1% of the budget comes from yearly appropriations from the Oklahoma Legislature, with 99% as grants coming from the United States federal government.

=== Salary ===
The annual salary of the Secretary of Environment is one of the few Cabinet Secretary positions which is not set by law. As such, it is left to the Governor to determine the Secretary's salary. Despite this, if the Secretary serves as the head of State agency, the Secretary receives the higher of the two salaries. Currently Secretary Sherrer has elected to not receive compensation while serving as secretary.

== Agencies overseen ==
The Secretary of Environment oversees the following state entities:

Agency	Function
Department of Environmental Quality	Enforces State clean air, clean water, and land protection laws
Department of Wildlife Conservation	Protects endangered animals and regulates hunting activities
Water Resources Board	Aids in the development of State water resources infrastructure

The Secretary represents the Governor of Oklahoma before the following entities:

- Air Quality Council
- Arkansas-Oklahoma Arkansas River Compact Commission
- Arkansas River Basin Interstate Committee
- Bioenergy Initiative
- Canadian River Commission
- Central Interstate Low-Level Radioactive Waste Compact Commission
- Compliance Advisory Panel
- Environmental Finance Authority
- Hazardous Waste Management Advisory Council
- Kansas-Oklahoma Arkansas River Compact Commission
- Laboratory Services Advisory Council
- Lead Impacted Communities Relocation Assistance Trust
- Radiation Management Advisory Council
- Red River Compact Commission
- Solid Waster Management Advisory Council
- Water Law Advisory Committee
- Water Quality Management Advisory Council
- Water Research Institute
- Water Resources Research Coordinating Committee

The Secretary also oversees the Clean Energy Independence Commission, the Encouraging Conservation in Oklahoma (ECO) Task Force and various other conservation and sustainability efforts of the State government.

== List of secretaries ==
#	Name	Took office	Left office	Governor served under
1	Patty Eaton	July, 1993	January, 1995	David Walters
2	Gary Sherrer	January, 1995	January, 1997	Frank Keating
3	Brian C. Griffin	January, 1997	January, 2003	Frank Keating
4	Miles Tolbert	January, 2003	August, 2008	Brad Henry
5	J.D. Strong	August, 2008	January 14, 2011	Brad Henry
6	Gary Sherrer	January 14, 2011	Present	Mary Fallin

== See also ==
- Clean Water Act
- Comprehensive Environmental Response, Compensation, and Liability Act
- Environmental Protection Agency
- Oil Pollution Act of 1990
