= Oklahoma Energy Resources Board =

State Agency

Agency overview
- Formed: January 1, 1993
- Headquarters: 500 NE 4th St; Oklahoma City, Oklahoma
- Employees: 11 unclassified
- Annual budget: $12 million
- Ministers responsible: David D. Le Norman, Chair of the Board
- Agency executive: Mindy Stitt, Executive Director
- Website: Oklahoma Energy Resources Board

The Oklahoma Energy Resources Board (OERB) is an agency of the state of Oklahoma. Funded voluntarily by Oklahoma's oil and natural gas producers and royalty owners, the OERB conducts environmental restoration of orphaned and abandoned well sites, encourages the wise and efficient use of energy, and promotes energy education.

Unique is the OERB's funding process – though it is funded by a 0.1% assessment on oil and gas sales (not uncommon among similar agencies), it is a voluntary assessment. Any producer or royalty owner may opt out of the program by requesting OERB (between January 1 and March 31 of each year) for a refund of previously paid assessments. The OERB states that over 95% of participants remain in the program.

The Board is composed of 21 members. 7 members are appointed by the Governor of Oklahoma, 7 are appointed by the President pro tempore of the Oklahoma Senate, and 7 appointed by the Speaker of the Oklahoma House of Representatives. All members are either independent oil or natural gas producers or representatives of major oil companies that do business in Oklahoma. The Board, in turn, appoints an Executive Director to serve as the chief administrative officer of the Board.

The current board chairman is David Le Norman, Managing Partner & Founder of Reign Capital Holdings LLC.

OERB was created by the Oklahoma Legislature and energy industry leaders in 1993 during the term of Governor of Oklahoma David Walters.

== Mission ==
The stated missions of the Oklahoma Energy Resources Board are:

- to educate Oklahomans about the importance of petroleum (oil and natural gas) in their lives through traditional and non-traditional school curricula, advertising, and public relations
- to environmentally restore abandoned well sites to productive land use
- to promote environmentally sound production methods and technologies
- to research and provide educational activities concerning the petroleum exploration and production industry

== Leadership ==
OERB is under the leadership of a 21-member voluntary board of directors. David D. Le Norman serves as the Chairman and Mindy Stitt serves as the Executive Director.

== Environmental restoration ==
Since its creation in 1993, the OERB has committed $139 million to restore more than 18,000 abandoned and orphaned well sites as part of its environmental restoration program. It has made restoration progress in 70 of Oklahoma's 77 counties.

== Education ==
Throughout its history, the OERB has reached more than 3 million Oklahoma students with energy curricula, classroom supplies, field trips, college scholarships and presentations. The OERB reaches all academic grade levels – from kindergarten through college with its energy education programs, including:

- The OERB Petroleum Scholar Program distributes up to $500,000 each year to Oklahoma college students majoring in petroleum-related fields. The deadline for these scholarships is March 1 of each year and applications can be found at OERB.com/scholarships.
- The PetroTech Program provides training and certification for Oklahomans interested in Geo Tech, Land Tech and Engineering Tech positions within the oil and natural gas industry. The Oklahoma Energy Resources Board created the PetroTech Program to help prepare Oklahomans for careers in the energy industry. A year after its inauguration, the program had accepted more than 400 students and industry employers are now hiring PetroTech graduates.
- Petro Pros gives oil and natural gas professionals an opportunity to volunteer their time to visit classrooms and show children the science and business side of the industry.
- Little Bits is a kindergarten through second grade energy curriculum that introduces simple energy terms through games and reading.
- Fossils to Fuel and Fossils to Fuel 2 are elementary school energy curricula.
- Petro Active is a middle school energy curriculum.
- Rockin' Ratios is a middle school math curriculum.
- Core Energy is a high school energy curriculum.
- Museum Partnerships allow the OERB to partner with several museums across the state to enhance energy education curricula and provide free classroom field trips.
- Well Site Safety Day is an annual event at the State Capitol to spread awareness that well sites are for professionals only to children, parents and teachers.
