= 2016 United States Senate election in Oklahoma =

- November 8, 2016
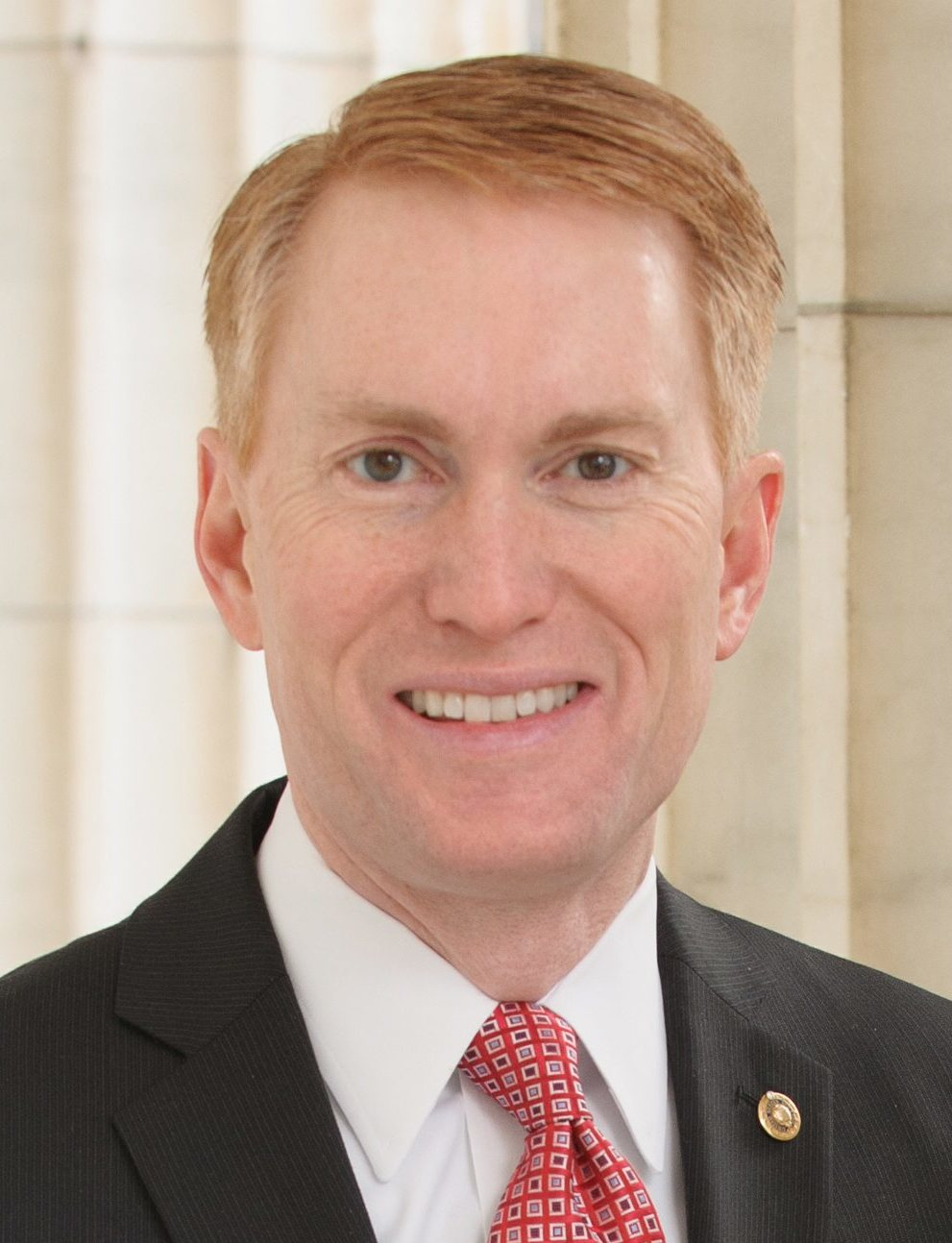

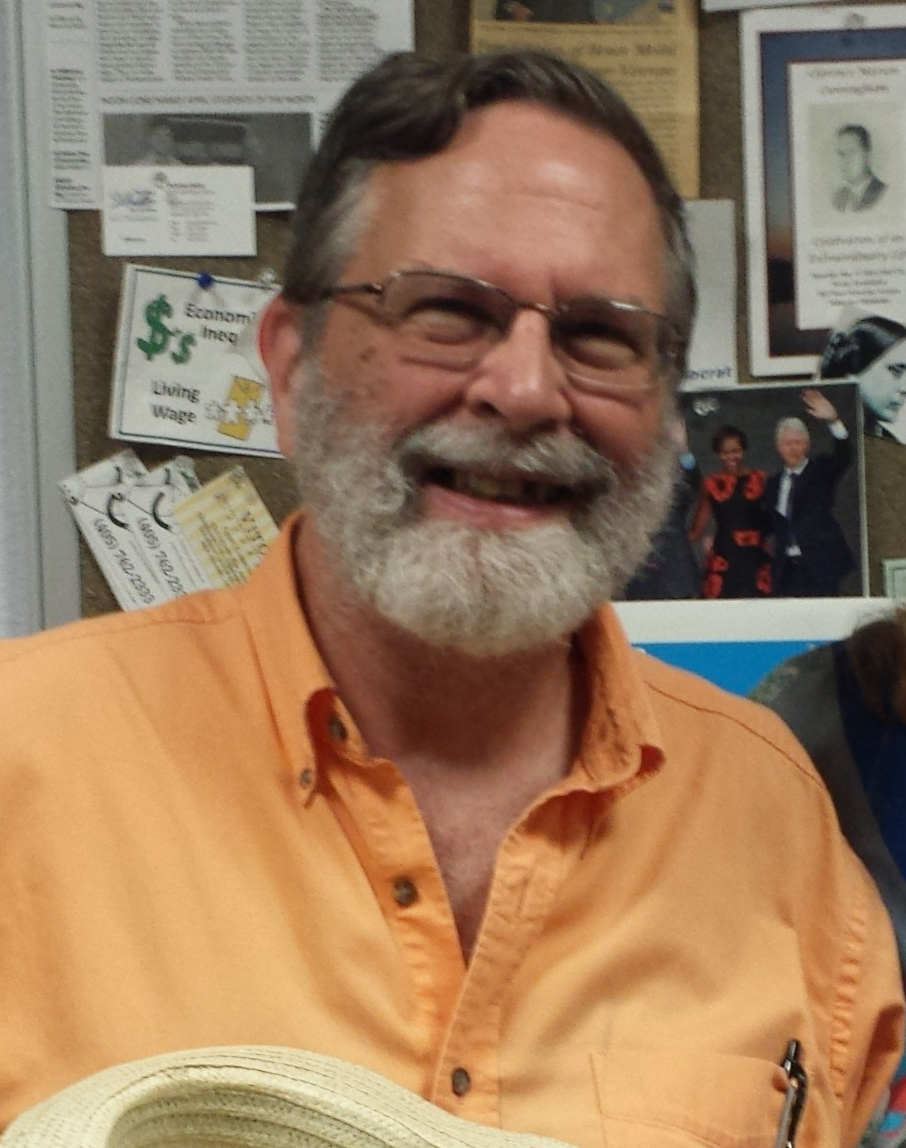
Nominee	James Lankford	Mike Workman
Party	Republican	Democratic
Popular vote	980,892	355,911
Percentage	67.74%	24.58%
- Lankford: 40–50% 50–60% 60–70% 70–80% 80–90% >90% Workman: 30–40% 40–50% 50–60% 60–70% 70–80% 80–90% >90% Tie: 40–50% No votes
U.S. senator before election
James Lankford
Republican
Elected U.S. Senator
James Lankford
Republican

The 2016 United States Senate election in Oklahoma was held November 8, 2016 to elect a member of the United States Senate to represent the State of Oklahoma, concurrently with the 2016 U.S. presidential election, as well as other elections to the United States Senate in other states and elections to the United States House of Representatives and various state and local elections. The primaries were held June 28.

Incumbent Republican Senator James Lankford won re-election to a full term in office by a landslide margin of 43%, sweeping every county statewide in the Republican stronghold.

== Republican primary ==
=== Candidates ===
==== Declared ====
- James Lankford, incumbent senator

== Democratic primary ==
=== Candidates ===
==== Declared ====
- Mike Workman, political consultant and nominee for Labor Commissioner in 2014

==== Withdrew ====
- Steve Perry, attorney and nominee for OK-05 in 2008

==== Declined ====
- Dan Boren, former U.S. Representative
- Joe Dorman, former state representative, and nominee for Governor in 2014
- Brad Henry, former governor of Oklahoma
- Constance N. Johnson, former State Senator and nominee for the U.S. Senate in 2014

== Libertarian primary ==
=== Candidates ===
==== Declared ====
- Dax Ewbank, Republican candidate for Governor in 2014
- Robert Murphy, independent candidate for OK-05 in 2014

=== Results ===
Libertarian primary results
Party	Candidate	Votes	%
Libertarian	Robert Murphy	1,537	58.89%
Libertarian	Dax Ewbank	1,073	41.11%
Total votes		2,610	100.00%

== General election ==
=== Predictions ===
Source	Ranking	As of
The Cook Political Report	Safe R	November 2, 2016
Sabato's Crystal Ball	Safe R	November 7, 2016
Rothenberg Political Report	Safe R	November 3, 2016
Daily Kos	Safe R	November 8, 2016
Real Clear Politics	Safe R	November 7, 2016

=== Polling ===
Poll source	Date(s) administered	Sample size	Margin of error	James Lankford (R)	Mike Workman (D)	Undecided
SurveyMonkey	November 1–7, 2016	1,271	± 4.6%	61%	37%	2%
SurveyMonkey	October 31–November 6, 2016	1,116	± 4.6%	60%	38%	2%
SurveyMonkey	October 28–November 3, 2016	905	± 4.6%	62%	36%	2%
SurveyMonkey	October 27–November 2, 2016	737	± 4.6%	62%	36%	2%
SurveyMonkey	October 26–November 1, 2016	519	± 4.6%	62%	35%	3%
SurveyMonkey	October 25–31, 2016	472	± 4.6%	62%	35%	3%

=== Results ===
United States Senate election in Oklahoma, 2016
Party	Candidate	Votes	%	±%
Republican	James Lankford (incumbent)	980,892	67.74%	−0.11%
Democratic	Mike Workman	355,911	24.58%	−4.40%
Libertarian	Robert T. Murphy	43,421	3.00%	N/A
Independent	Sean Braddy	40,405	2.79%	N/A
Independent	Mark T. Beard	27,418	1.89%	−1.28%
Total votes		1,448,047	100.0%	N/A
Republican hold				

==== By congressional district ====
Lankford won all five congressional districts.

District	Lankford	Workman	Representative
1st	65%	27%	Jim Bridenstine
2nd	69%	24%	Markwayne Mullin
3rd	76%	17%	Frank Lucas
4th	68%	23%	Tom Cole
5th	60%	31%	Steve Russell
