= Christina Fallin =

Musician

- Born: March 18, 1987 (age 39); Oklahoma City, Oklahoma, U.S.
- Education: University of Oklahoma
- Spouses: Matthew William Bacon (m. 2011; ann. 2012); Eric K. Smith (m. 2012; div. 2012)
- Mother: Mary Fallin
- Musical career
- Genres: Electronica
- Member of: Pink Pony

Christina Marie Fallin (born March 18, 1987) is a singer and former lobbyist from Oklahoma and the daughter of former Oklahoma governor Mary Fallin. Fallin's lobbying career lasted from January 2010 until January 2011, when her mother was inaugurated. Her music career includes involvement with bands Milk on Milk and Pink Pony.

In March 2014, Fallin posted a picture of herself wearing an indigenous headdress online that was criticized for being a sign of disrespect to indigenous peoples by the daughter of the governor of Oklahoma, the state with the highest number of federally recognized tribes. Fallin quickly responded by issuing a statement asking for the community's forgiveness and explaining her motives, but this explanation outraged members of the Muscogee Creek Nation, who saw it as an attack on tribal symbolism. Governor Mary Fallin issued an apology for her daughter's actions that emphasized her own commitments and values to Native American tribes.

In July 2015, after Christina Fallin was found living in a trailer located on the grounds of the Oklahoma governor's mansion, her mother pledged to have her trailer removed.

== Background ==
Fallin was born and raised in Oklahoma City, Oklahoma. She is the eldest child and only daughter of Dr. Joseph Price Fallin II and Governor of Oklahoma Mary Fallin. She has one brother, Joseph Price Fallin III (born September 27, 1990). Fallin attended the University of Oklahoma.

== Career ==
Fallin was a lobbyist starting in January 2010 and resigned when her mother was inaugurated as Governor of Oklahoma on January 15, 2011. She has since started a consulting business. She has also been involved in music projects, including a band called Milk on Milk with her former husband Matt Bacon, and a more recent project called Pink Pony.

== Controversy ==
=== Native American headdress ===
In March 2014, Fallin was photographed wearing a native headdress. She posted the picture to Facebook with the caption "Appropriate Culturation", a word play on the phrase "cultural appropriation". After receiving criticism for the picture, Fallin later issued a statement stating her motives including the phrase, "Please forgive us if we innocently adorn ourselves with your beautiful things," regarding Native American culture.

Fallin's statement outraged members of the Muscogee Creek Nation prompting an XoJane article by Joy Harjo titled, "I am of the Muscogee Creek Nation and Christina Fallin should have known better."

In April 2014, Pink Pony performed at the Norman Music Festival. That morning, the band's Facebook posted a status saying "I heard Pink Pony was wearing full regalia tonight". Fallin appeared in a shawl that was made from her drapery with "sheep" written on the back. Native American protesters, led by musician Samantha Crain picketed the show with signs such as "I am not a costume." Native activists, such as Summer Wesley (often cited as Chahta Summer) and other members of Eradicating Offensive Native Mascotry (EONM) had been called "sheep" by Pink Pony, during the earlier incident surrounding the headdress photo, and Fallin's display was perceived as an intentional act of continued disrespect.

Ultimately, the controversy reached the point that Governor Mary Fallin issued a statement criticizing her daughter's actions. It read: "On Saturday night, while performing at the Norman Music Festival, my daughter acted in a way that I believe was inappropriate. While she will always be my daughter and I love her very much, I don't approve of her behavior on that night or that of her band. I have communicated that to Christina. I have great respect for Oklahoma's tribal members and I celebrate their traditions and culture. As governor, I work in hand in hand with tribal leaders on everything from disaster response to economic development. Tribal governments are important partners to our state government, and I value the good relationships my administration has cultivated with them."

=== Trailer at Governor's Mansion ===
In July 2015, it was discovered that Fallin had been living for months in a trailer located on the grounds of the Oklahoma Governor's Mansion, attached to the facilities' utilities. Learning that this was in violation of zoning regulations, the governor pledged to have the trailer removed within a few days.

== Personal life ==
In June 2011, Fallin married Matthew William Bacon in Ireland. She filed for an annulment in April 2012. She remarried on July 2, 2012, to Eric K. Smith, seven weeks after the annulment was granted. Smith filed for divorce on November 29, 2012.
