= Corey Holland =

American politician

Member of the Oklahoma House of Representatives from the 51st district
- In office November 18, 2008 – November 14, 2012
- Preceded by: Ray McCarter
- Succeeded by: Scott Biggs

Personal details
- Born: January 1, 1970 (age 56) Duncan, Oklahoma
- Party: Republican

Corey Holland (born January 1, 1970) is a Mexican-American educator and currently the Superintendent of Marlow Public Schools. He was a politician who served in the Oklahoma House of Representatives from the 51st district from 2008 to 2012.
