= 2014 Oklahoma gubernatorial election =

- November 4, 2014
- Turnout: 40.7%
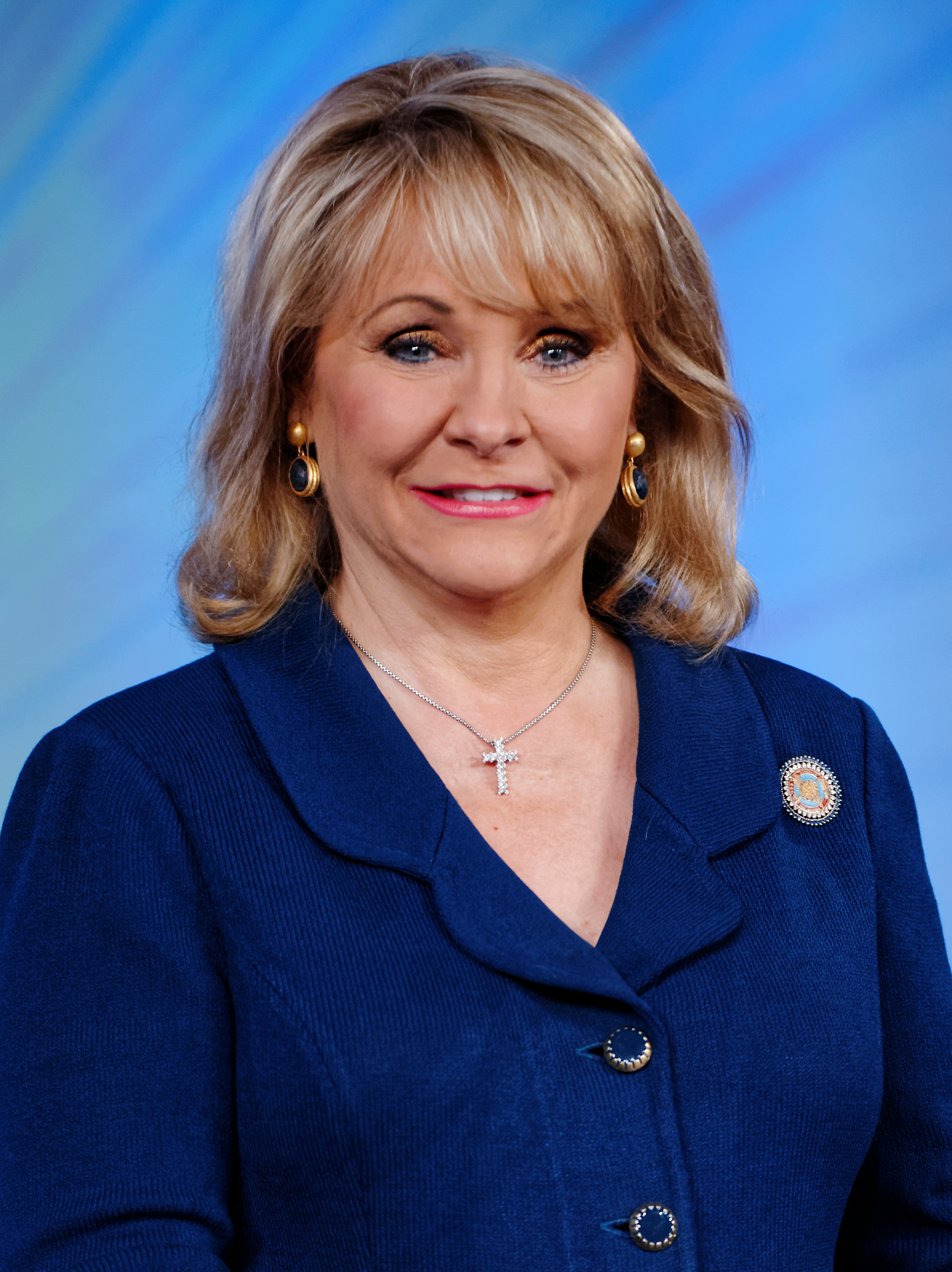

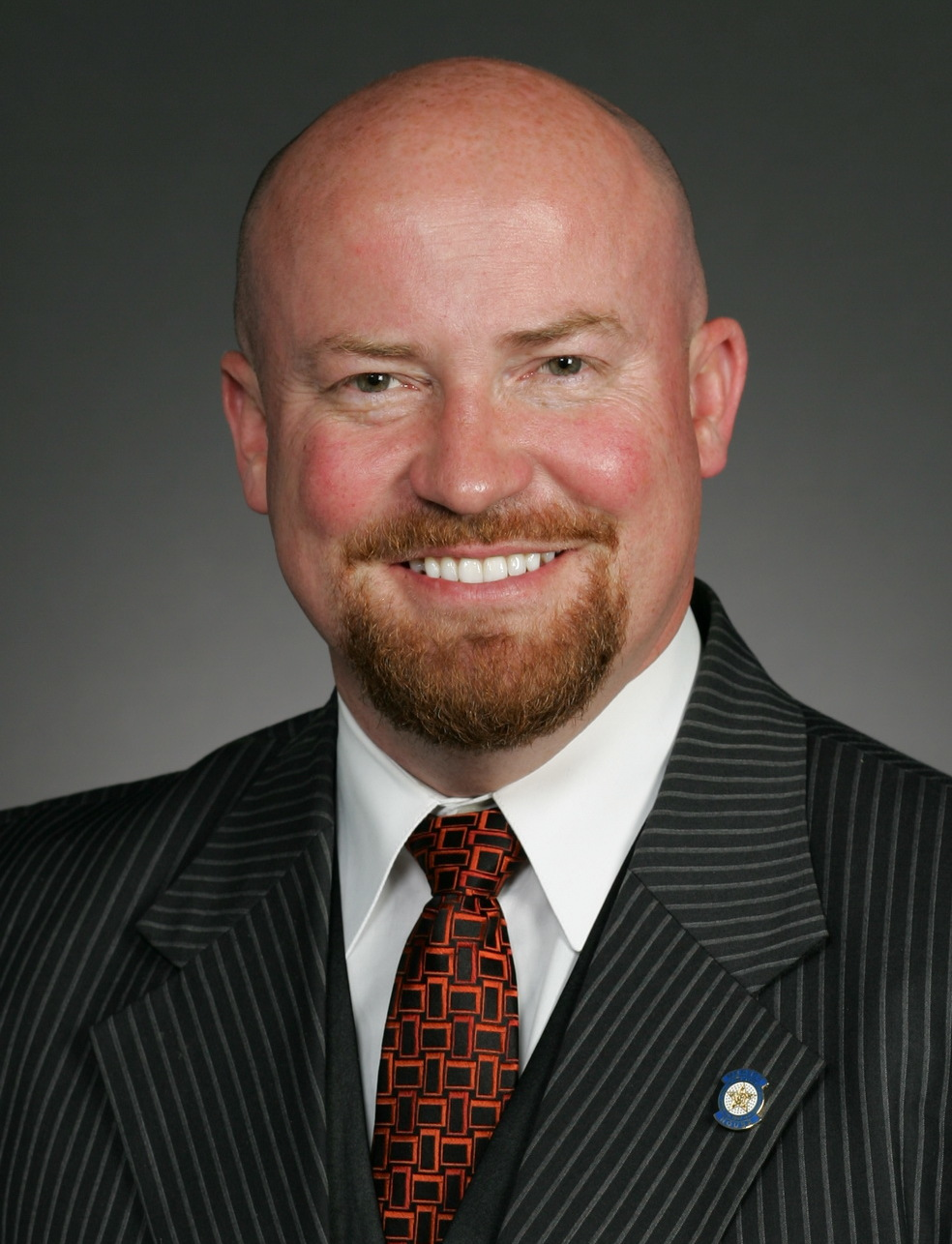
Nominee	Mary Fallin	Joe Dorman
Party	Republican	Democratic
Popular vote	460,298	338,239
Percentage	55.81%	41.01%
- County results Fallin: 40–50% 50–60% 60–70% 70–80% Dorman: 40–50% 50–60%
Governor before election
Mary Fallin
Republican
Elected Governor
Mary Fallin
Republican

The 2014 Oklahoma gubernatorial election was held on November 4, 2014, to elect the governor of Oklahoma. Incumbent Governor Mary Fallin was re-elected with 55.8% of the vote over state Representative Joe Dorman. Primaries were held on June 24, 2014. Fallin won the Republican nomination with more than 75% of the vote, and Dorman won the Democratic nomination uncontested.

== Republican primary ==
Fallin, the incumbent, easily defeated Chad "The Drug Lawyer" Moody, and Dax Ewbank, who would run as a Libertarian for U.S. Senate in 2016. Ewbank and Moody both stressed ending the war on drugs and protecting 2nd Amendment rights.

=== Candidates ===
==== Declared ====
- Dax Ewbank
- Mary Fallin, incumbent governor
- Chad Moody, attorney

==== Withdrew ====
- Randy Brogdon, former state senator and candidate for governor in 2010 (ran for the U.S. Senate and lost)

==== Declined ====
- T. W. Shannon, former speaker of the Oklahoma House of Representatives (ran for the U.S. Senate and lost)

=== Results ===
Republican primary results
Party	Candidate	Votes	%
Republican	Mary Fallin (incumbent)	200,035	75.52
Republican	Chad Moody	40,839	15.42
Republican	Dax Ewbank	24,020	9.07
Total votes		264,894	100.00

== Democratic primary ==
Dorman was unopposed for the Democratic nomination.

=== Candidates ===
==== Declared ====
- Joe Dorman, state representative

==== Withdrew ====
- R. J. Harris, Libertarian candidate for president in 2012 and candidate for Oklahoma's 4th congressional district in 2010 and 2012 (endorsed Dorman)

==== Declined ====
- Dan Boren, former U.S. representative (endorsed Dorman)
- David L. Boren, president of the University of Oklahoma, former U.S. senator and former governor (endorsed Dorman)
- Brad Henry, former governor (endorsed Dorman)
- M. Susan Savage, former mayor of Tulsa and former secretary of state of Oklahoma (endorsed Dorman)

== Independents ==
=== Candidates ===
==== Declared ====
- Richard Prawdzienski, former chair of the Libertarian Party of Oklahoma and candidate for lieutenant governor of Oklahoma in 2010
- Kimberly Willis

==== Disqualified ====
- Joe Sills

== General election ==
=== Debates ===
- Complete video of debate, October 2, 2014

=== Predictions ===
Source	Ranking	As of
The Cook Political Report	Solid R	November 3, 2014
Sabato's Crystal Ball	Safe R	November 3, 2014
Rothenberg Political Report	Safe R	November 3, 2014
Real Clear Politics	Likely R	November 3, 2014

=== Polling ===
Poll source	Date(s) administered	Sample size	Margin of error	Mary Fallin (R)	Joe Dorman (D)	Other	Undecided
Sooner Poll	October 25–29, 2014	949	± 3.18%	48%	40%	5%	7%
CBS News/NYT/YouGov	October 16–23, 2014	995	± 5%	56%	32%	0%	12%
CBS News/NYT/YouGov	September 20–October 1, 2014	1,244	± 3%	58%	33%	1%	8%
Sooner Poll	September 27–29, 2014	400	± 4.9%	50%	36%	6%	8%
Clarity Campaigns*	August 18–September 2, 2014	841	± 3.47%	45%	43%	4%	8%
CBS News/NYT/YouGov	August 18–September 2, 2014	821	± 5%	53%	35%	1%	10%
Sooner Poll	August 28–30, 2014	603	± 4%	50%	32%	3%	15%
Cole Hargrave Snodgrass	July 20–25, 2014	500	± 4.3%	44%	31%	4%	22%
CBS News/NYT/YouGov	July 5–24, 2014	1,312	± 4.7%	49%	40%	6%	5%
Rasmussen Reports	July 15–16, 2014	750	± 4%	45%	40%	7%	8%

- * Internal poll for the Joe Dorman campaign

=== Results ===

2014 Oklahoma gubernatorial election
Party	Candidate	Votes	%	±%
Republican	Mary Fallin (incumbent)	460,298	55.81%	−3.09%
Democratic	Joe Dorman	338,239	41.01%	+1.79%
Independent	Kimberly Willis	17,169	2.08%	
Independent	Richard Prawdzienski	9,125	1.11%	
Total votes		824,831	100.0%	
Majority		122,059	14.80%	
Republican hold		Swing	-6.10%	

=== Results by county ===
County	Mary Fallin Republican		Joe Dorman Democratic		All others Independent		Margin		Total votes cast
County	#	%	#	%	#	%	#	%	Total votes cast
Adair	2,238	53.94%	1,737	41.87%	174	4.19%	501	12.08%	4,149
Alfalfa	972	62.79%	530	34.24%	46	2.97%	442	28.55%	1,548
Atoka	1,825	52.34%	1,527	43.79%	135	3.87%	298	8.55%	3,487
Beaver	1,110	73.22%	343	22.63%	63	4.16%	767	50.59%	1,516
Beckham	2,785	59.87%	1,701	36.56%	166	3.57%	1,084	23.30%	4,652
Blaine	1,589	60.12%	970	36.70%	84	3.18%	619	23.42%	2,643
Bryan	4,337	49.52%	4,122	47.07%	299	3.41%	215	2.45%	8,758
Caddo	2,625	45.11%	3,082	52.96%	112	1.92%	-457	-7.85%	5,819
Canadian	18,456	65.88%	8,708	31.08%	850	3.03%	9,748	34.80%	28,014
Carter	5,990	55.85%	4,241	39.54%	494	4.61%	1,749	16.31%	10,725
Cherokee	4,093	45.05%	4,655	51.24%	337	3.71%	-562	-6.19%	9,085
Choctaw	1,743	55.70%	1,282	40.97%	104	3.32%	461	14.73%	3,129
Cimarron	576	75.29%	137	17.91%	52	6.80%	439	57.39%	765
Cleveland	30,989	51.45%	27,247	45.24%	1,991	3.31%	3,742	6.21%	60,227
Coal	749	42.78%	937	53.51%	65	3.71%	-188	-10.74%	1,751
Comanche	10,091	50.46%	9,299	46.50%	610	3.05%	792	3.96%	20,000
Cotton	902	53.56%	730	43.35%	52	3.09%	172	10.21%	1,684
Craig	1,958	54.94%	1,491	41.84%	115	3.23%	467	13.10%	3,564
Creek	9,618	62.71%	5,210	33.97%	509	3.32%	4,408	28.74%	15,337
Custer	4,210	64.59%	2,124	32.59%	184	2.82%	2,086	32.00%	6,518
Delaware	5,614	62.45%	3,126	34.77%	250	2.78%	2,488	27.68%	8,990
Dewey	996	66.58%	454	30.35%	46	3.07%	542	36.23%	1,496
Ellis	888	71.21%	316	25.34%	43	3.45%	572	45.87%	1,247
Garfield	7,247	57.14%	4,906	38.68%	530	4.18%	2,341	18.46%	12,683
Garvin	3,417	56.63%	2,428	40.24%	189	3.13%	989	16.39%	6,034
Grady	7,027	54.42%	5,568	43.12%	317	2.46%	1,459	11.30%	12,912
Grant	979	61.26%	558	34.92%	61	3.82%	421	26.35%	1,598
Greer	820	55.11%	616	41.40%	52	3.49%	204	13.71%	1,488
Harmon	404	58.89%	269	39.21%	13	1.90%	135	19.68%	686
Harper	750	69.64%	289	26.83%	38	3.53%	461	42.80%	1,077
Haskell	1,254	50.42%	1,176	47.29%	57	2.29%	78	3.14%	2,487
Hughes	1,555	53.22%	1,262	43.19%	105	3.59%	293	10.03%	2,922
Jackson	3,071	73.00%	1,018	24.20%	118	2.80%	2,053	48.80%	4,207
Jefferson	640	51.61%	555	44.76%	45	3.63%	85	6.85%	1,240
Johnston	1,133	48.09%	1,119	47.50%	104	4.41%	14	0.59%	2,356
Kay	6,131	61.38%	3,551	35.55%	307	3.07%	2,580	25.83%	9,989
Kingfisher	2,662	71.83%	948	25.58%	96	2.59%	1,714	46.25%	3,706
Kiowa	1,305	53.09%	1,090	44.34%	63	2.56%	215	8.75%	2,458
Latimer	1,016	43.05%	1,266	53.64%	78	3.31%	-250	-10.59%	2,360
Le Flore	5,281	53.78%	4,074	41.49%	465	4.74%	1,207	12.29%	9,820
Lincoln	5,377	61.70%	3,001	34.43%	337	3.87%	2,376	27.26%	8,715
Logan	6,864	64.22%	3,462	32.39%	363	3.40%	3,402	31.83%	10,689
Love	1,177	54.82%	877	40.85%	93	4.33%	300	13.97%	2,147
Major	1,417	64.41%	693	31.50%	90	4.09%	724	32.91%	2,200
Marshall	1,792	52.41%	1,494	43.70%	133	3.89%	298	8.72%	3,419
Mayes	5,158	54.23%	4,016	42.22%	3374	3.54%	1,142	12.01%	9,511
McClain	5,593	61.71%	3,210	35.42%	260	2.87%	2,383	26.29%	9,063
McCurtain	3,445	51.24%	2,917	43.39%	361	5.37%	528	7.85%	6,723
McIntosh	2,361	51.23%	2,098	45.52%	150	3.25%	263	5.71%	4,609
Murray	1,606	54.40%	1,251	42.38%	95	3.22%	355	12.03%	2,952
Muskogee	6,822	47.61%	7,039	49.12%	469	3.27%	-217	-1.51%	14,330
Noble	1,901	65.15%	927	31.77%	90	3.08%	974	33.38%	2,918
Nowata	1,656	61.22%	953	35.23%	96	3.55%	703	25.99%	2,705
Okfuskee	1,290	48.96%	1,254	47.59%	91	3.45%	36	1.37%	2,635
Oklahoma	79,853	51.31%	71,431	45.90%	4,356	2.80%	8,422	5.41%	155,640
Okmulgee	4,165	50.79%	3,780	46.09%	256	3.12%	385	4.69%	8,201
Osage	5,861	52.08%	5,009	44.51%	383	3.40%	852	7.57%	11,253
Ottawa	2,950	56.54%	2,066	39.59%	202	3.87%	884	16.94%	5,218
Pawnee	2,191	59.65%	1,346	36.65%	136	3.70%	845	23.01%	3,673
Payne	7,954	51.38%	7,088	45.79%	438	2.83%	866	5.59%	15,480
Pittsburg	5,163	50.77%	4,599	45.22%	408	4.01%	564	5.55%	10,170
Pontotoc	3,664	45.96%	4,051	50.82%	257	3.22%	-387	-4.85%	7,972
Pottawatomie	8,909	60.93%	5,237	35.82%	475	3.25%	3,672	25.11%	14,621
Pushmataha	1,319	51.22%	1,136	44.12%	120	4.66%	183	7.11%	2,575
Roger Mills	778	63.82%	409	33.55%	32	2.63%	369	30.27%	1,219
Rogers	14,048	64.01%	7,167	32.66%	730	3.33%	6,881	31.36%	21,945
Seminole	2,663	55.84%	1,955	40.99%	151	3.17%	708	14.85%	4,769
Sequoyah	4,676	54.12%	3,649	42.23%	315	3.65%	1,027	11.89%	8,640
Stephens	6,393	56.24%	4,613	40.58%	362	3.18%	1,780	15.66%	11,368
Texas	2,466	76.39%	639	19.80%	123	3.81%	1,827	56.60%	3,228
Tillman	991	58.54%	644	38.04%	58	3.43%	347	20.50%	1,693
Tulsa	74,867	56.87%	53,073	40.31%	3,709	2.82%	21,794	16.55%	131,649
Wagoner	10,675	63.77%	5,500	32.85%	566	3.38%	5,175	30.91%	16,741
Washington	8,795	66.45%	3,912	29.56%	528	3.99%	4,883	36.89%	13,235
Washita	1,943	63.41%	1,039	33.91%	82	2.68%	904	29.50%	3,064
Woods	1,440	58.68%	916	37.33%	98	3.99%	524	21.35%	2,454
Woodward	3,029	70.77%	1,126	26.31%	125	2.92%	1,903	44.46%	4,280
Totals	460,298	55.81%	338,239	41.01%	26,294	3.19%	122,059	14.80%	824,831

==== Counties that flipped from Democratic to Republican ====
- Comanche (largest city: Lawton)
- Cotton (largest city: Walters)
- Jefferson (largest city: Waurika)
- Stephens (largest city: Duncan)

==== Counties that flipped from Republican to Democratic ====
- Caddo (largest city: Anadarko)
- Cherokee (largest city: Tahlequah)
- Coal (largest city: Coalgate)
- Latimer (largest city: Wilburton)
- Muskogee (largest city: Muskogee)
- Pontotoc (largest city: Ada)

== See also ==
- 2014 United States elections
- 2014 United States gubernatorial elections
- 2014 United States Senate elections
