= Ray McCarter =

Oklahoma Chickasaw state legislator veteran

Member of the Oklahoma House of Representatives from the 51st district
- In office November 1996 – November 2008
- Preceded by: Bill Smith
- Succeeded by: Corey Holland

Personal details
- Born: Ray Gene McCarter; October 2, 1946 (age 79) Duncan, Oklahoma, U.S.
- Citizenship: American; Chickasaw Nation
- Party: Democratic Party
- Education: Oklahoma College of Liberal Arts (B.A.); Southwestern State College (M.E.); University of Oklahoma (EdD)

Ray Gene McCarter is an American and Chickasaw politician who served in the Oklahoma House of Representatives representing the 51st district from 1996 to 2008.

== Biography ==
Ray Gene McCarter was born on October 2, 1946, in Duncan, Oklahoma, to Fred L. and Marjean Kimberlin McCarter. After high school, he served in United States Air Force during the Vietnam War. After the war, he graduated from the Oklahoma College of Liberal Arts, Southwestern State College, and the University of Oklahoma. He served in the Oklahoma House of Representatives as a member of the Democratic Party representing the 51st district from 1996 to 2008. He was inducted into the Chickasaw Nation Hall of Fame in 2008. His son, Clint McCarter, died in a 2007 automotive accident in Las Vegas while working as a teacher in the city.
