= Mary Fallin =

American politician (born 1954)

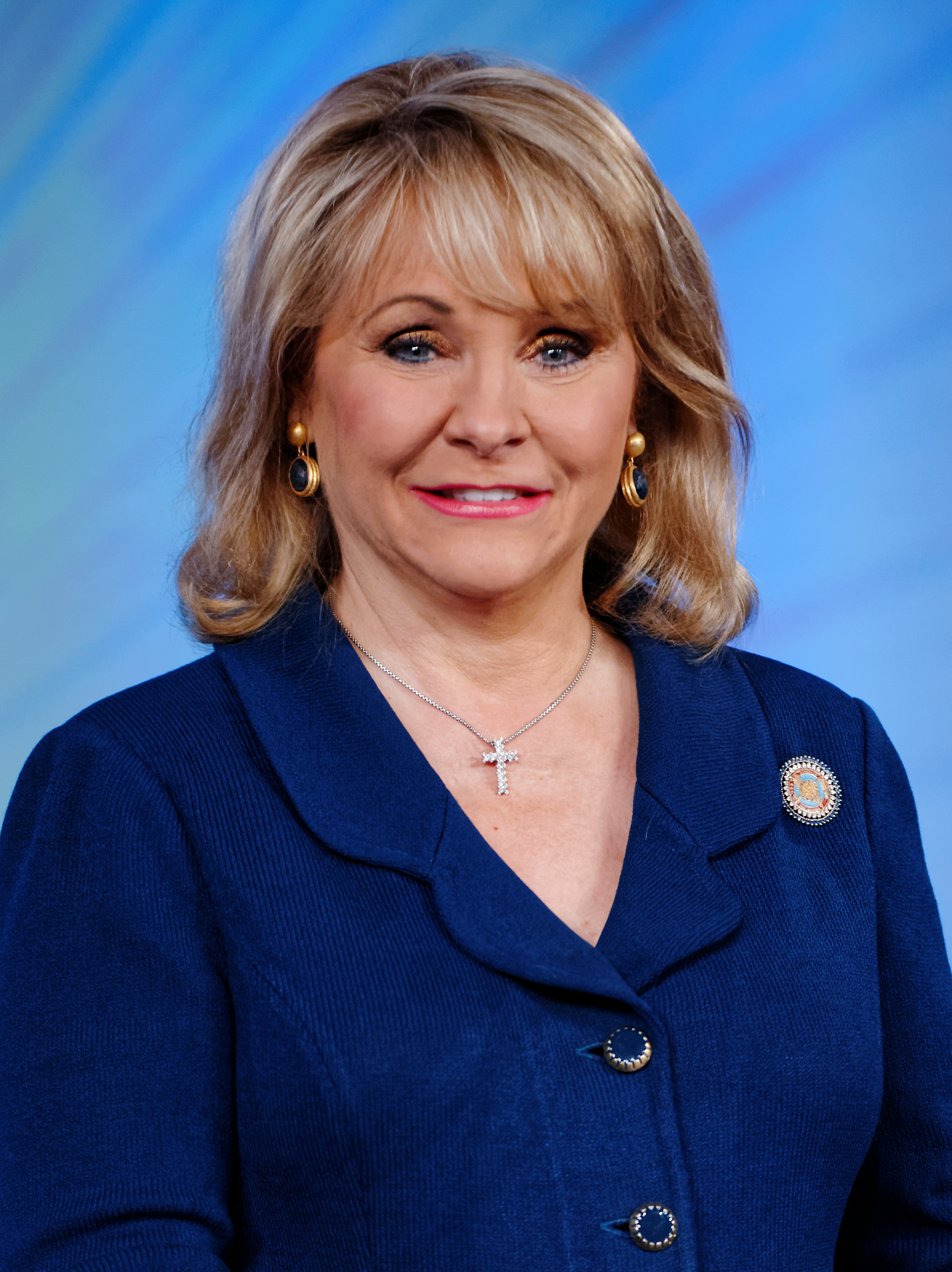
- Fallin in 2015

27th Governor of Oklahoma
- In office January 10, 2011 – January 14, 2019
- Lieutenant: Todd Lamb
- Preceded by: Brad Henry
- Succeeded by: Kevin Stitt

Chair of the National Governors Association
- In office August 4, 2013 – July 13, 2014
- Preceded by: Jack Markell
- Succeeded by: John Hickenlooper

Member of the U.S. House of Representatives from Oklahoma's 5th district
- In office January 3, 2007 – January 3, 2011
- Preceded by: Ernie Istook
- Succeeded by: James Lankford

14th Lieutenant Governor of Oklahoma
- In office January 9, 1995 – January 2, 2007
- Governor: Frank Keating; Brad Henry
- Preceded by: Jack Mildren
- Succeeded by: Jari Askins

38th Chair of the National Lieutenant Governors Association
- In office 1997–1998
- Preceded by: Scott McCallum
- Succeeded by: Ronnie Musgrove

Member of the Oklahoma House of Representatives from the 85th district
- In office January 8, 1991 – January 9, 1995
- Preceded by: Mike Hunter
- Succeeded by: Odilia Dank

Personal details
- Born: Mary Copeland; December 9, 1954 (age 71) Warrensburg, Missouri, U.S.
- Party: Democratic (before 1975); Republican (1975–present)
- Spouses: Joseph Fallin (m. 1984; div. 1998); Wade Christensen (m. 2009)
- Children: 3 (with Fallin); 3 stepchildren (with Christensen)
- Education: Oklahoma Baptist University (attended); Oklahoma State University, Stillwater (BS)
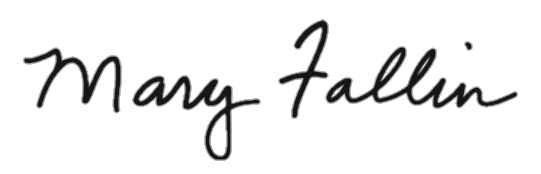
- Signature

Mary Newt Fallin (/ˈfælɪn/; née Copeland; born December 9, 1954) is an American politician and real estate broker who served as the 27th governor of Oklahoma from 2011 to 2019. A member of the Republican Party, she previously served as the U.S. representative for Oklahoma's 5th congressional district from 2007 to 2011, and as lieutenant governor from 1995 to 2007. As of 2026, Fallin remains the only woman to have served as governor of Oklahoma.

Beginning a career in politics, Fallin was elected to the Oklahoma House of Representatives in 1990. She served two terms in the Oklahoma House, representing a district in Oklahoma City, from 1990 to 1995. In 1994, Fallin was elected to serve as the 14th lieutenant governor of Oklahoma; being elected to a total of three terms, she served under two different governors from 1995 to 2007. After seven-term Republican incumbent Ernest Istook announced that he would retire from his seat to run for governor, Fallin declared her candidacy for Oklahoma's 5th congressional district, where she was elected to two terms in the U.S. House of Representatives, serving from 2007 to 2011.

Fallin ran for Governor of Oklahoma in 2010. She defeated three other opponents with 54% of the vote in the Republican primary, and defeated the Democratic nominee, Lieutenant Governor Jari Askins, with 60% of the vote in the general election. She won re-election in 2014, defeating Oklahoma state representative Joe Dorman. Term limits barred Fallin from seeking a third term to the governorship in 2018; fellow Republican Kevin Stitt was elected to succeed her.

== Early life, education, and early career ==
Fallin was born Mary Copeland in Warrensburg, Missouri, the daughter of Mary Jo (née Duggan) and Joseph Newton Copeland. Her mother and father each served terms as mayor of Tecumseh, Oklahoma, where she was raised. They were both members of the Oklahoma Democratic Party. She was a Democrat until she was 21. That year she switched to the Republican Party of Oklahoma and became active with the Young Republicans. She graduated from Tecumseh High School and attended Oklahoma Baptist University, in Shawnee. Fallin holds a bachelor of science degree in human and environmental sciences, and family relations and child development from Oklahoma State University (1977). At Oklahoma State she joined the Kappa Alpha Theta sorority.

== Government and Private Sector Employment ==
After college, Fallin worked for the Oklahoma Department of Tourism and Recreation, Oklahoma Employment Security Commission, and the Oklahoma Office of Personnel Management. In 1983, she went to the private sector as a hotel manager for Lexington Hotel and Suites, located at Richmond Square near Blackwelder and Northwest Expressway which was later demolished to make way for OnCue. She has also worked as marketing director for a Ski Lodge in Utah, and in Oklahoma was a commercial real estate broker.

== Oklahoma House of Representatives ==
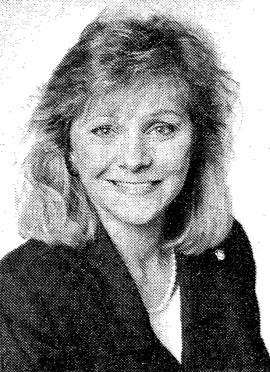
Fallin as a state representative

=== Elections ===
Fallin ran for the 85th district of the Oklahoma House of Representatives after incumbent Mike Hunter announced his retirement in December 1989. She won the Republican primary in August and the general election in November. In 1992, she won re-election to a second term unopposed.

=== Tenure ===
She represented Oklahoma City in the House, and authored 16 bills that became law. In 1992, Oklahoma became one of the first five states in the nation to enact anti-stalking legislation when Fallin authored and introduced HB 2291, which made it illegal to stalk or harass people. Fallin was active with the conservative American Legislative Exchange Council (ALEC), and was recognized by ALEC as Legislator of the Year in 1993. Also that year she was named Guardian of Small Business by the National Federation of Independent Business. According to The Almanac of American Politics, she "championed victims' rights and health care reform."

== Lieutenant Governor (1995–2007) ==
=== Elections ===
After two terms in the House, Fallin decided to run for Lieutenant Governor of Oklahoma. Ultimately she ran in three elections that year, all of which were against other women, and raised about $200,000. She faced two other candidates in the Republican primary. Terry Neese ranked first with 38% of the vote, but failed to reach the 50% threshold needed to win outright. Fallin ranked second with 36% of the vote, qualifying for the run-off election. She defeated Neese in the run-off primary election 53%–47%. She defeated Democrat Nance Diamond 50%–44%. She did well in the northwest region, the Oklahoma Panhandle, and her home Oklahoma County.

She won re-election to a second term in 1998, defeating Jack Morgan 68%–32%. She won all but nine counties, all of which were located in the far eastern part of the state. She won re-election to a third term in 2002, defeating Democratic State Representative Laura Boyd 57%–39%, dominating the eastern part of the state.

=== Tenure ===
In 1995, Fallin became the first woman and first Republican to be sworn in as lieutenant governor of Oklahoma, an office she would hold for 12 years. As lieutenant governor, Fallin served on 10 boards and commissions. Early in her tenure, the Alfred P. Murrah Federal Building, located in Oklahoma City, was bombed, killing 168 people in what became the worst case of domestic terrorism in United States history; Fallin led a task force to rebuild the childcare center that was lost in the attack. In 1997, she chaired the Fallin Commission on Workers' Compensation, which released a comprehensive reform plan to lower costs in the state's workers' compensation system. Fallin promoted Project Homesafe, a national initiative of the National Shooting Sports Foundation, a firearms industry trade association, to distribute free cable gun locks to reduce the risk of accidental in-home shootings.

In her role as the president of the state senate, Fallin promoted legislation to adopt a right-to-work law prohibiting labor unions from requiring members to pay union dues as a condition of employment; Oklahoma ultimately passed a right-to-work law in 2001. With 12 years of service, Fallin was the third longest-serving Lieutenant Governor in Oklahoma history.

=== Leadership positions ===
In 1998, Fallin served as chairwoman of the National Lieutenant Governors Association. In 1999, she served as chairwoman of the Republican Lieutenant Governors Association. Fallin also served as the national Chairwoman of the Aerospace States Association.

== U.S. House of Representatives (2007–2011) ==
=== Elections ===
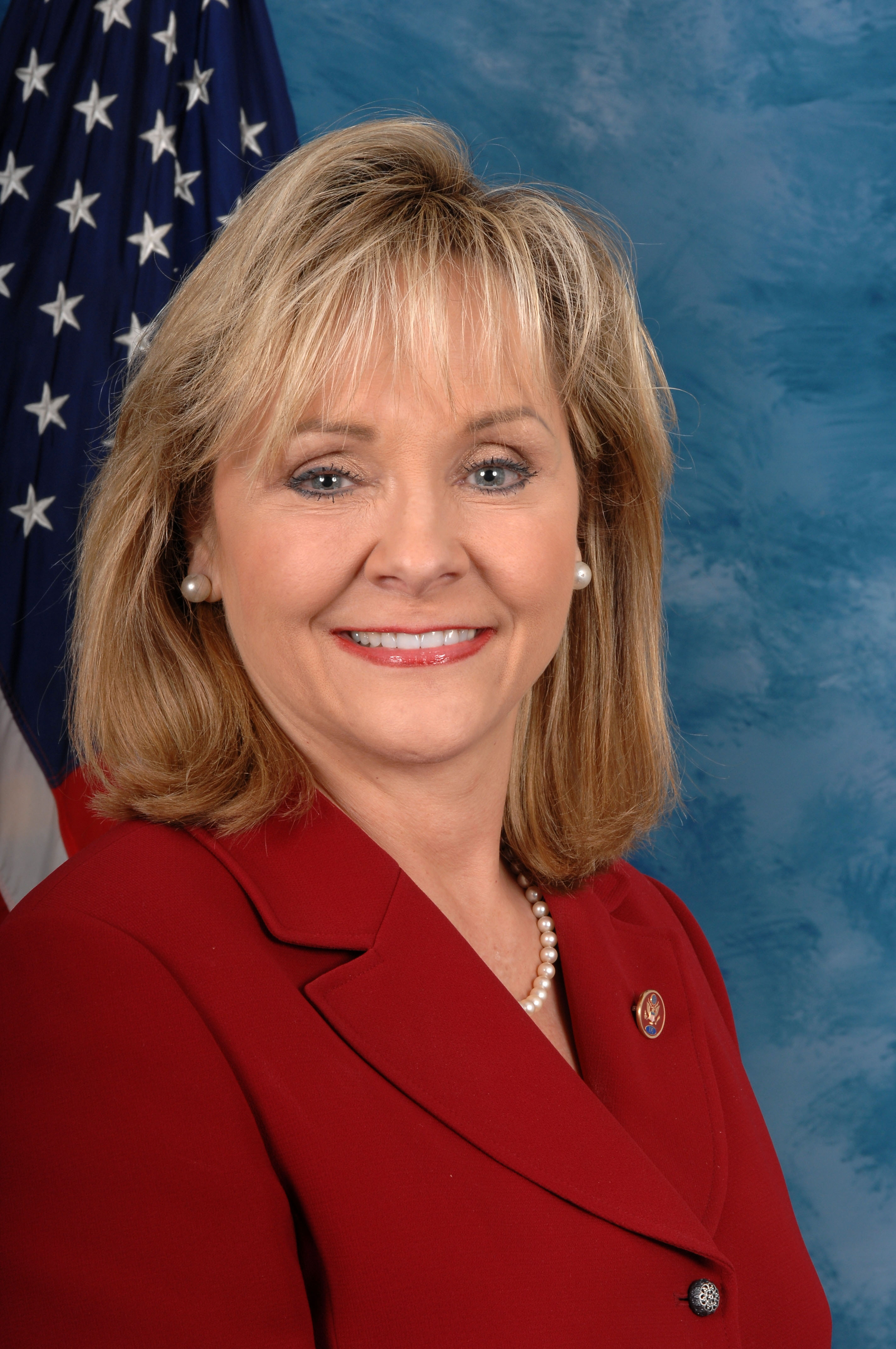
Fallin during her tenure in the House

==== 2006 ====
Fallin decided not to seek re-election to a fourth term as lieutenant governor. Instead, she decided to run in Oklahoma's 5th congressional district, after incumbent Republican congressman Ernest Istook decided to run for governor of Oklahoma. Fallin also considered running for governor and challenging incumbent Democrat Brad Henry, but decided against it given Henry's popularity as measured in polls at the time. Istook lost to Henry by a landslide of 33 percentage points.

The July 25 Republican primary for the 5th district had six candidates. Fallin received 35% of the vote. Oklahoma City Mayor Mick Cornett finished second with 24% of the vote. The contest between her and Cornett was largely financial. They had few differences on the issues, but Fallin had a big cash advantage. On August 22, 2006, she defeated Cornett in the run-off primary election, 63%–37%.

Fallin won the general election on November 7, defeating Democrat Paul David Hunter 60%–40%.

==== 2008 ====
Fallin easily won re-election in 2008, defeating Democrat Steve Perry 66%–34%.

=== Tenure ===
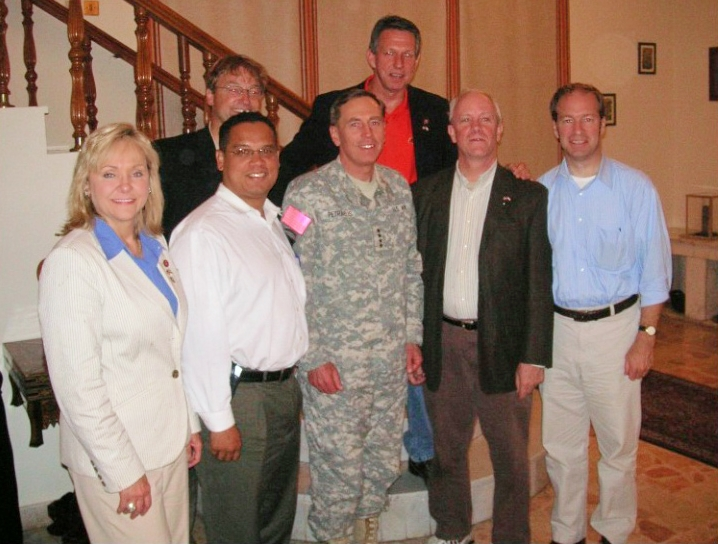
Rep. Mary Fallin, Keith Ellison, and Jerry McNerney among other congressional delegates meet with Commander of Multi-National Force – Iraq General David Petraeus in 2007

Fallin became the first woman elected to Congress from Oklahoma since 1920, when Alice Mary Robertson became Oklahoma's first (and the nation's second) woman to be elected to Congress. Fallin resigned her position as Lieutenant Governor on January 2, 2007, in order to be sworn into Congress on January 4, 2007. Lieutenant Governor-elect Jari Askins was appointed by Oklahoma Governor Brad Henry to fill the remaining days of Fallin's term.

The 5th district included Oklahoma, Pottawatomie, and Seminole counties.

In June 2007, she passed her first bill: a revamping of federal grants for women's business centers. She joined a group of 38 Republicans who opposed an expansion of the State Children's Health Insurance Program (CHIP).

During the 2008 financial crisis, Fallin voted for the Emergency Economic Stabilization Act of 2008. However, Fallin voted against the auto industry rescue plan of 2008.

From 2007 to 2010, she served as the top Republican on the House Small Business subcommittee with oversight over the Small Business Administration. In this capacity, she joined subcommittee chairman Jason Altmire and fellow Oklahoma Republican congressman John Sullivan in holding a congressional field hearing in Tulsa to investigate the impact of federal energy proposals on Oklahoma businesses.

=== Committee assignments ===
- House Committee on Armed Services
- House Committee on Small Business
- House Committee on Transportation and Infrastructure
- United States House Committee on Natural Resources

=== Caucus memberships ===
In addition to her committee assignments, she served on the Executive Committee of the National Republican Congressional Committee, Small Business Chairwoman on the Republican Policy Committee, and Vice Chairwoman of the Congressional Women's Caucus.

== 2010 gubernatorial election ==
In September 2009, Fallin and four other candidates had announced their intentions to run for governor to succeed Brad Henry. Along with Fallin they were:

- Former President of the Oklahoma Office Machine Dealers Association (OOMDA) Roger L. Jackson (R)
- Attorney General of Oklahoma Drew Edmondson (D)
- Lieutenant Governor of Oklahoma Jari Askins (D)
- State Senator Randy Brogdon (R)
- Oklahoma business owner Robert Hubbard (R)

Fallin won the Republican nomination with 136,460 votes, ahead of her nearest challenger, State Senator Randy Brogdon, who received 98,159 votes. Former Alaska governor and 2008 vice-presidential candidate Sarah Palin endorsed Fallin in the primary. On November 2, 2010, Fallin defeated Democratic nominee Jari Askins 60% to 39% to become Oklahoma's first female governor.

== Governor of Oklahoma (2011–2019) ==
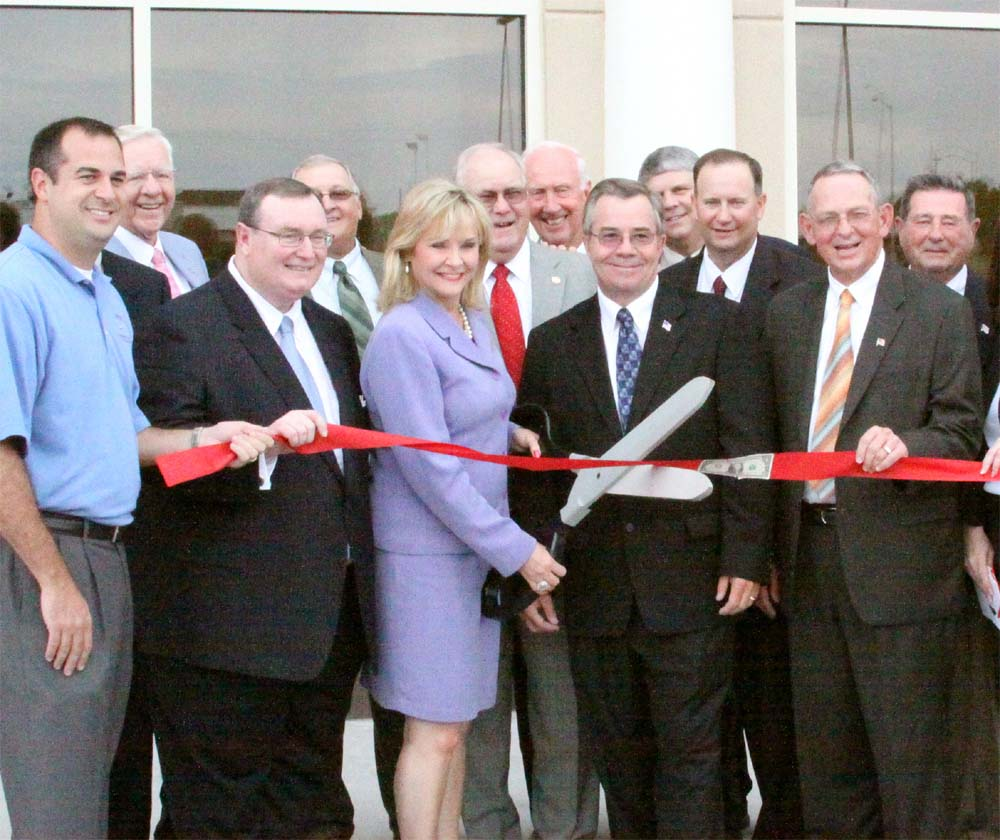
Oklahoma Governor Mary Fallin at the ribbon cutting ceremony for the opening of the University Center in Ponca City, Oklahoma on July 12, 2011

=== Transition, staff and advisors ===
In the election in which Fallin was elected governor, every statewide Republican official on the ballot was victorious, and for the first time in Oklahoma history, Republicans dominated all 11 statewide positions. Fallin began her transition by holding a joint press conference with outgoing governor Brad Henry.

Fallin named Devon Energy chairman and CEO Larry Nichols as the chairman of her transition team and outgoing Oklahoma Senate President pro tempore Glenn Coffee (R-Tulsa) as the Transition's Co-Chairman. She also established her Governor's Taskforce on Economic Development to advise her on matters related to the economy. Members of that task force include BancFirst CEO David Rainbolt and former Walters Administration Secretary of Agriculture Gary Sherrer. Former Keating Administration Secretary of Energy Robert J. Sullivan, Jr. serves as the director of the Taskforce as the Special Advisor to the Governor on Economic Development.

Fallin appointed Gary Sherrer as Oklahoma Secretary of the Environment, a position he previously held under Democratic governor David Walters; Tulsa city auditor Preston Doerflinger as Oklahoma Secretary of Finance and Revenue and director of the Oklahoma Office of State Finance; and state health commissioner Terry Cline as Oklahoma Secretary of Health and Human Services.

Fallin appointed Dave Lopez Oklahoma Secretary of Commerce and Tourism and director of the Oklahoma Department of Commerce in 2011. Lopez left Fallin's cabinet in 2013, but returned in 2017, when Fallin appointed him secretary of state.

Fallin named Lieutenant Governor Todd Lamb to her cabinet as Small Business Advocate. In February 2017, however, Lamb resigned from the Small Business Advocate post, saying that he could not support Fallin's proposal to impose the sales tax to 164 different services that are currently not taxed. Lamb said that proposal would harm small businesses and families in the state; Fallin responded by saying she was disappointed in the resignation and that her proposals were necessary to address the $900 million "structural deficits of our budget."

Fallin's general counsel, Jennifer Chance, abruptly resigned in 2017, five months after becoming general counsel, amid a conflict-of-interest controversy. Chance had referred legal business involving Robert Bates, a reserve deputy convicted of manslaughter in the fatal shooting of Eric Harris in 2015, to her husband, a criminal defense attorney who was paid $25,000 to seek a governor's commutation of Bates's sentence. Fallin appointed former state senator James Williamson to replace Chance.

=== Public opinion ===
The state’s first female governor started with a strong approval rating but departed with an approval rating of 23.4 percent.

=== Criminal law ===
==== Lethal injection controversy ====
Under Fallin, Oklahoma has pushed for increased use of lethal injection as a mode of execution, while refusing to release details of the new chemical concoctions used in these executions following chemical company Hospira's decision to stop producing sodium thiopental, which had previously been widely used. Fallin pushed strongly for the execution of convicted murderer Clayton Lockett to proceed in spite of the lack of tested drugs to use for lethal injection. When the Oklahoma State Supreme Court granted a stay of execution, Fallin immediately overruled it, leading some political commentators to raise the possibility of a constitutional crisis surrounding the separation of powers. At the same time, a member of the Oklahoma legislature moved to impeach the seven justices on the Supreme Court who had granted the stay. Lockett's execution was attempted on April 29, 2014, but was abandoned when he could not be sedated and was left writhing in pain. Lockett died 43 minutes later of a heart attack. Fallin appointed a member of her staff to lead the investigation into the botched execution. Robert Patton, her director of corrections, resigned, and despite an Oklahoma conflict of interest law, was hired as a deputy warden by GEO Group whose contract he had overseen. Oklahoma State Prison warden Anita Trammel also resigned during the investigation.

==== Criminal justice reform ====
In 2016, Fallin convened an Oklahoma Justice Reform Task Force to make various recommendations on criminal justice reform in Oklahoma, which has the second-highest incarceration rate among U.S. states. In 2017, Fallin praised a package of bills passed by the state House and state Senate; the bills, which passed unanimously or by broad margins, would, among other things, allow nonviolent offenders sentenced to life imprisonment to petition for a sentence modification after ten years in prison; expand diversion programs that steer convicted persons from prison to treatment and supervision; mandate "the creation of individualized plans for inmates to help them better reintegrate into society" after release from prison; and establish an oversight council to track the effectiveness of reform initiatives.

In 2017, however, Fallin struggled to push further major criminal justice reform bills through the legislature. This package of bills, supported by Fallin and recommended by the Task Force, would lower sentences for nonviolent drug crimes, allow more elderly prisoners to be paroled, and expand diversion programs. The bills were bottled up in the House Judiciary-Criminal Justice and Corrections Committee under its chairman, state Representative Scott Biggs, which prompted Fallin to criticized Biggs. In August 2017, Fallin was sued by inmates alleging unfair parole hearings and corruption from state lawmakers.

==== Anti-protest legislation ====
In 2017 Fallin signed legislation establishing fines of at least $10,000 for protesters who trespass on critical infrastructure sites (such as fossil fuel facilities), or $100,000 and a 10-year prison sentence for protesters who "tamper" with such facilities. The legislation also imposes fines of up to $1 million on organizations found to have conspired with trespassers.

=== Ten Commandments monument controversy ===
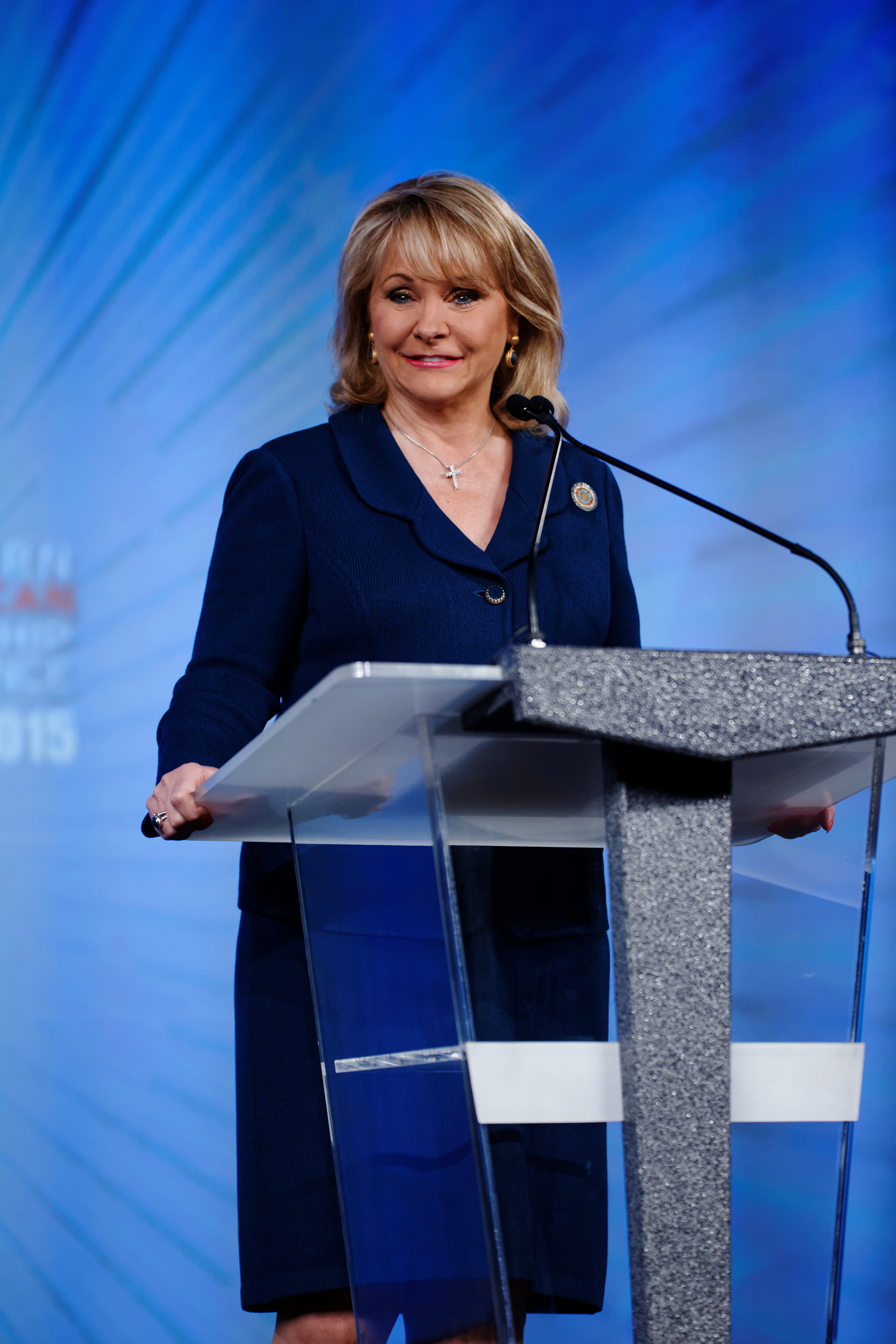
Governor Fallin at 2015 Southern Republican Leadership Conference in Oklahoma City, Oklahoma

Fallin was a supporter of a controversial Ten Commandments monument that had been erected on the Oklahoma State Capitol grounds in 2012. In July 2015, the Oklahoma Supreme Court ruled, in a 7–2 vote, that the monument's presence on public land violated the Oklahoma Constitution, which prohibits the use of public property "for the benefit of any religious purpose." Fallin initially refused to follow the court order, expressing the view that the ruling was incorrect and that the state would petition for a rehearing of the case.

The court's ruling was subsequently upheld, and in October 2015 the monument was quietly removed from Capitol grounds to a private property several blocks away. Fallin called for a state constitutional amendment to restore the monument to the Capitol grounds. The Legislature passed the resolution placing the question on the Oklahoma ballot, with voters to decide at the November 2016 election. The resolution was subsequently defeated.

=== 2016 vice-presidential speculation ===
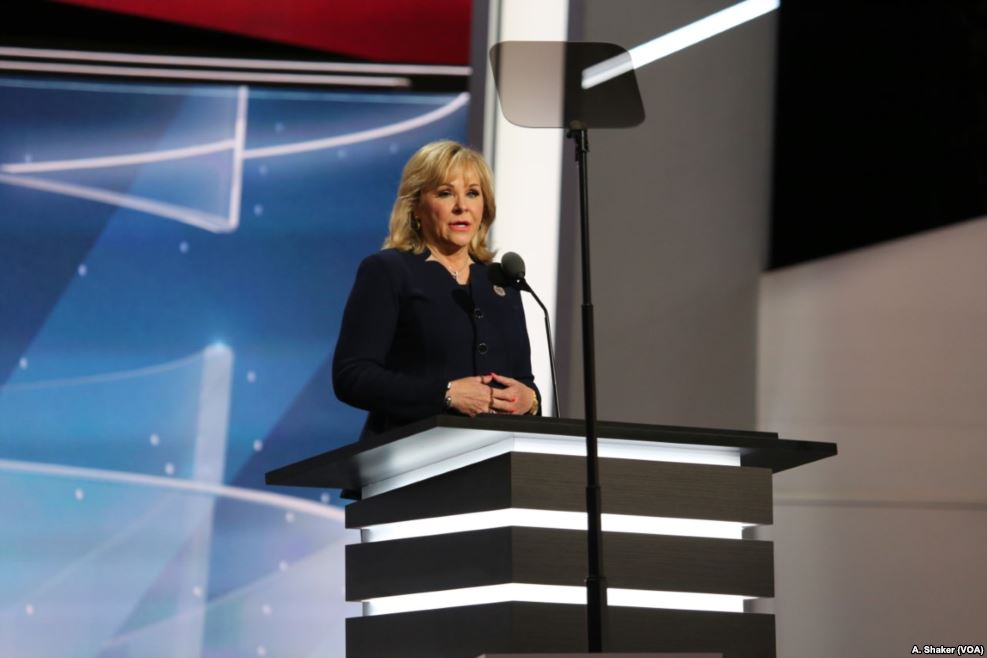
Fallin speaking at the 2016 Republican National Convention

In a televised interview in April 2016, Fallin's name was mentioned by former South Carolina Lieutenant Governor André Bauer as a potential running mate for Donald Trump, should he become the Republican presidential nominee in the 2016 presidential election. Trump himself described Bauer's suggestion as "great advice" in a tweet shortly afterwards. Fallin later endorsed Trump on May 4, 2016.

In May 2016, the Republican National Committee announced that Fallin would serve as co-chairwoman to the 2016 Republican National Convention's Committee on Resolutions, known as the Platform Committee.

=== Fiscal policy ===
Governor Mary Fallin stands with a family that survived the devastating 2013 Moore tornado with winds exceeding 200 miles per hour

Over the course of her tenure as governor, Fallin has sought to eliminate Oklahoma's state income tax while expanding sales taxes.

Cutting Oklahoma's personal income tax, the state's largest source of tax revenue, has been a "top priority" for Fallin and Republican legislators. In the 2012 legislative session, legislation advocated by Fallin and allies to cut the top income tax from 5.25% to 4.8% while eliminating 33 tax credits failed, in part because the legislation would increase the tax burden on around one-quarter of Oklahoma taxpayers, particularly middle-class taxpayers with two or more children.

In 2016, Fallin ultimately secured a reduction in the state income tax from 5.25 percent to 5 percent, which would result in an annually loss of $147 million in revenue to the state when fully implemented. In the aftermath of a steep drop in oil and gas prices that hurt state revenue, the state Senate passed legislation to roll the tax cut back, which Fallin opposed. The budget revenue caused by the drop in state revenue forced a cut of 16.5% to Oklahoma public schools for the last several months of the 2016 fiscal year on top of a previous 3% reduction, and compelled some schools in rural Oklahoma to go to a four-day school week.

In February 2016 at the opening of the Oklahoma Legislature's session, Fallin proposed $200 million in increased taxes to deal with an anticipated budget shortfall of at least $900 million for fiscal year 2017, which Fallin said was the largest budget hole in state history. Fallin proposed expanding state sales and use taxes to services and items delivered electronically such as music sold online, neither of which are currently taxed in Oklahoma. Fallin also proposed eliminating some annual sales-tax exemptions and more than doubling the state cigarette tax, from $1.03 to $2.53 per pack. Fallin proposed reducing appropriations to most state agencies by 6 percent, with smaller cuts of 3 percent to certain core agencies.

The budget legislation ultimately signed into law by Fallin in June 2016 eliminated the refundable portion of the state earned income tax credit as well as the double deduction income tax credit; the budget also reduced some tax credits. The partial repeal of the state's earned income tax credit was supported by legislative Republicans, who wanted additional revenue for the state to close a shortfall, and opposed by legislative Democrats and the Oklahoma Policy Institute, who argued that it was wrong to eliminate a tax credit that helped working poor Oklahomans. The budget cut most state services by 5%, with steeper cuts to higher education, which was cut 16%. (Corrections and healthcare funding remained steady.) In May 2016, Fallin also signed into law a measure requiring online retailers and consumers to collect sales taxes for goods purchased online.

In 2017, Fallin pushed to expand the state sales tax to 164 services that are not currently taxed, in order to raise hundreds of millions of dollars in state revenue. Fallin specifically proposed imposing sales tax on the top ten services by sales: residential utility services, as well as "cable TV services; repair and maintenance services; legal services; real estate agent services; plumbing and heating services; electrical and wiring services; oil field services; business services; and accounting services." Fallin's proposed tax increase would increase monthly residential utility costs by 4.5%. In return for imposing sales tax on these items, Fallin proposed the elimination of the state sales tax on groceries, although local sales tax for groceries would remain.

In May 2017, Fallin vetoed a bill to permit more high-interest payday loans in Oklahoma. The bill had strong support in the Republican-controlled state legislature but was opposed by a broad coalition of political and religious groups who opposed the bill as enabling predatory lending. Fallin vetoed similar legislation four years earlier.

=== Abortion legislation ===
During her term as governor, Fallin signed 20 anti-abortion measures into law. In April 2015, Fallin signed into law a measure banning a common second-trimester abortion procedure, dilation and evacuation, except when necessary to save the life of the woman. In May 2015, Fallin signed into law a measure that tripled the mandatory waiting period in Oklahoma for an abortion, extending it to 72 hours. The measure also included other anti-abortion provisions.

In May 2016, Fallin vetoed a bill passed by the Oklahoma State Legislature that would have made it a felony, punishable by up to three years in prison, to perform an abortion, except in instances to save the life of the mother. In a statement, Fallin's office said: "The bill is so ambiguous and so vague that doctors cannot be certain what medical circumstances would be considered 'necessary to preserve the life of the mother.'"

In December 2016, Fallin signed into law a bill to require all Oklahoma Department of Health-regulated entities, including restaurants, public buildings, hospitals, and small businesses, to install anti-abortion signs in their public restrooms by January 2018. The bill appropriates no state funding for the signs, requiring businesses to pay the estimated cost (estimated to be $2.3 million).

=== LGBT issues ===
Fallin was criticized for bias after ordering state-owned National Guard facilities to deny spousal benefits (including the provision of identification cards that would allow them to access such benefits) to all same-sex couples. Fallin took the position that such relationships were illegitimate under Oklahoma law. Fallin later backed down after U.S. Secretary of Defense Chuck Hagel stated that Oklahoma would be in violation of federal law for refusing to recognize the relationships.

In 2018, Fallin signed legislation that would allow private adoption agencies to refuse to place children in homes if it "would violate the agency's written religious or moral convictions or policies." The legislation was opposed by LGBT rights groups, which said that the legislation would allow discrimination against LGBT couples seeking to adopt.

=== Guns ===
In 2014, Fallin vetoed a bill that would have required sheriffs and police chief to approve individuals' "applications for tax stamps for items such as silencers, suppressors, short-barreled rifles and shotguns, and automatic weapons." The Republican-controlled legislature overrode the veto.

In 2015, Fallin vetoed legislation that would have restricted businesses' ability to prohibit guns in parks, fairgrounds and recreational areas.

In 2018, Fallin vetoed legislation to authorize adults to publicly carry guns without permit or training, prompting the NRA to criticize her.

=== Climate change ===
Fallin is part of a group of Republican governors who have said that they will refuse to comply with Environmental Protection Agency regulations to reduce carbon emissions and combat climate change. In April 2015, Fallin issued an executive order prohibiting the Oklahoma Department of Environmental Quality and other state agencies from creating an emissions-reduction strategy under the Clean Power Plan, becoming the first governor to do so.

In a proclamation in September 2016, Fallin declared October 13, 2016, to be Oilfield Prayer Day, calling upon Christians to "thank God for the blessing created by the oil and natural gas industry and to seek His wisdom and ask for protection." The proclamation attracted criticism because it was initially limited only to Christians. Following these objections, Fallin amended the proclamation to include people of "all faiths."

=== Local governments ===
In April 2014, Fallin signed into law S.B. 1023, which prohibits cities in Oklahoma from establishing citywide minimum wages or sick-leave requirements. The legislation targeted Oklahoma City, where a local initiative sought to establish a citywide minimum wage higher than the current federal minimum wage.

In May 2015, Fallin signed into law a measure prohibiting Oklahoma local governments from enacting local bans on oil and gas drilling. The bill was a response to a vote in Denton, Texas, to bar hydraulic fracturing (fracking), although no Oklahoma local government had attempted to ban fracking. The bill passed the state House 64-32 and the Senate 33-13; the bill was opposed by the Oklahoma Municipal League.

=== Education ===
In late January 2011, following a heated Oklahoma State Board of Education meeting, Fallin proposed major changes to the Oklahoma State Department of Education's organization and structure. The controversy arose over the Board of Education rejecting three senior staff members of Oklahoma State Superintendent of Public Instruction Janet Barresi. Under Fallin's proposed changes, the Board would be stripped of its administrative powers and those powers would be transferred solely to the state superintendent, thus reducing the board to more of an advisory committee to the superintendent as opposed to a government body of the department.

Fallin was formerly a champion of the Common Core State Standards (which Oklahoma adopted in 2010), but in June 2014 signed a bill dropping the standards.

In April 2015, Fallin signed into law a measure that expanded charter schools statewide (a change from previous law, which allowed charter schools only in Tulsa and Oklahoma counties). The legislation required all expanding charter schools to receive approval from the local boards of education, and mandated that all charter schools be free and open like traditional public schools, thereby eliminating the prospect of charter schools picking and choosing students.

In an April 2018 interview, Fallin likened teachers who demanded raises to "a teenage kid that wants a better car" and claimed that antifa were involved in an Oklahoma teachers' strike. Fallin also criticized "outside" groups that protested with Oklahoma teachers at Oklahoma State Capitol, referring to the National Education Association and West Virginia teachers.

=== Relations with Native American tribes ===
During Fallin's term, the State of Oklahoma engaged in an extended legal battle with the Choctaw Nation and Chickasaw Nation over water rights in southeastern Oklahoma. In 2011, the tribes filed a federal lawsuit in the U.S. District Court for the Western District of Oklahoma. In 2016, after years of negotiations and court proceedings, the state and the tribes—represented by Fallin, Choctaw Nation Chief Gary Batton, and Chickasaw Nation Governor Bill Anoatubby—came to a settlement agreement, with a compact (which needs congressional approval) to govern when and how water can be transferred out of Sardis Lake.

In May 2015, Fallin signed a bill for a $25 million bond proposal to complete the Native American Cultural Center and Museum, a project already underway. The legislation also returned ownership of the property and museum to Oklahoma City.

In March 2017, Fallin approved of the Shawnee Tribe's plan to build a $25 million casino close to Guymon in the Oklahoma Panhandle.

=== Medical marijuana ===
In the June 2018 primary election, Oklahoma voters approved State Question 788, a ballot measure that legalized the growth, possession, sale, and use of marijuana for medicinal purposes, and provided that physicians could broadly prescribe it for various conditions. During the campaign, Fallin opposed the measure, arguing that it would effectively legalize marijuana for recreational purposes, and indicated that if the measure passed, she would call a special session of the state legislature to set regulations on use.

On July 11, 2018, soon after the measure passed, Fallin signed stringent new emergency rules adopted by the Oklahoma Board of Health to prohibit the sale of marijuana in smokeable form and to require that a pharmacist be on-site at dispensaries during operating hours. These regulations angered marijuana activists, drawing bipartisan opposition in the state and fueling renewed calls for a special session of the legislature. After state Attorney General Michael J. Hunter determined that the adoption of the two rules exceeded the statutory authority of the Board of Health, Fallin urged the board to rescind the rules. Fallin criticized proponents of State Question 788 for their support of a ballot measure with a 30-day timeframe for implementation, but said that "the state will carry out the responsibility of administering" the new marijuana regime.

=== Executive action ===
==== Executive orders ====
An executive order is a directive issued by the Governor that manages operations of the executive branch of the State government. Unless authorized by the Legislature, executive orders do not have the force of law but are binding upon the executive branch. All executive orders expire 90 days following the inauguration of the next Governor unless otherwise terminated or continued during that time by a subsequent executive order.

Emergency Declaration
Honorific Designation
Issued by Acting Governor

| Relative No. | Year No. | Absolute No. | Date signed | Description | Ref. |
|---|---|---|---|---|---|
| 1 | 2011-03 | 761 | January 31, 2011 | Declaring a state of emergency due to natural disasters and directing Oklahoma Department of Emergency Management to coordinate response | |
| 2 | 2011-04 | 762 | January 31, 2011 | Declaring a statewide emergency and temporarily suspending regulations of the Federal Motor Carrier Safety Administration | |
| 3 | 2011-05 | 763 | February 14, 2011 | Requiring all State flags flown at half-staff on February 17, 2011, in honor of former State Representative John Bryant | |
| 4 | 2011-06 | 764 | February 14, 2011 | Creating the Oklahoma Governor's Cabinet | |
| 5 | 2011-07 | 765 | February 14, 2011 | Requiring all State flags flown at half-staff on March 17, 2011, in honor of Vietnam Veterans Day | |
| 6 | 2011-08 | 766 | March 11, 2011 | Declaring a state of emergency due to natural disasters and directing Oklahoma Department of Emergency Management to coordinate response | |
| 7 | 2011-09 | 767 | February 14, 2011 | Requiring all State flags flown at half-staff on March 25, 2011, in honor of deceased US Army Staff Sergeant Travis M. Thompkins | |
| 8 | 2011-08A | 768 | April 8, 2011 | Amending Executive Order No. 2011-08 | |
| 9 | 2011-10 | 769 | April 8, 2011 | Providing which Executive Orders from previous Governors remain in effect | |
| 10 | 2011-11 | 770 | April 12, 2011 | Prohibiting all new hirings and promotions of State employees without the approval of respective Cabinet Secretary | |
| 11 | 2011-12 | 771 | April 15, 2011 | Requiring all State flags flown at half-staff on April 19, 2011, in memory of Oklahoma City bombing | |
| 12 | 2011-13 | 772 | April 15, 2011 | Declaring a state of emergency due to natural disasters and directing Oklahoma Department of Emergency Management to coordinate response | |
| 13 | 2011-14 | 773 | April 15, 2011 | Declaring a statewide emergency and temporarily suspending regulations of the Federal Motor Carrier Safety Administration | |
| 14 | 2010-02A | 775 | April 19, 2011 | Amending Executive Order No. 2010-02 and establishing list of State holidays for 2011 | |
| 15 | 2011-15 | 776 | April 19, 2011 | Creating the Governor's Science and Technology Council and requiring Science and Technology Strategic Plan | |
| 16 | 2011-16 | 777 | April 27, 2011 | Declaring a state of emergency due to natural disasters and directing Oklahoma Department of Emergency Management to coordinate response | |
| 17 | 2011-17 | 778 | May 3, 2011 | Designating Oklahoma Lieutenant Governor Todd Lamb as State Small Business Advocate | |
| 18 | 2011-08B | 779 | May 6, 2011 | Amending Executive Order No. 2011-08 | |
| 19 | 2011-18 | 780 | May 16, 2011 | Requiring all State flags flown at half-staff on May 16, 2011, in honor of Peace Officers Memorial Day | |
| 20 | 2011-19 | 781 | May 20, 2011 | Creating the Governor's Unmanned Aerial System Council and requiring Unmanned Aerial Systems Roadmap | |
| 21 | 2011-20 | 782 | May 24, 2011 | Declaring a state of emergency due to natural disasters and directing Oklahoma Department of Emergency Management to coordinate response | |
| 22 | 2011-21 | 783 | May 25, 2011 | Declaring a state of emergency due to natural disasters and directing Oklahoma Department of Emergency Management to coordinate response | |
| 23 | 2011-22 | 784 | May 25, 2011 | Declaring a statewide emergency and temporarily suspending regulations of the Federal Motor Carrier Safety Administration | |
| 24 | 2011-23 | 785 | May 27, 2011 | Requiring all State flags flown at half-staff on May 30, 2011, in honor of Memorial Day | |
| 25 | 2011-20A | 786 | May 27, 2011 | Amending Executive Order No. 2011-20 | |
| 26 | 2011-24 | 787 | June 14, 2011 | Requiring all State flags flown at half-staff on June 17, 2011, in honor of civil rights activist Clara Luper | |
| 27 | 2011-25 | 788 | June 17, 2011 | Establishing State holiday schedule for 2012 | |
| 28 | 2011-26 | 789 | June 24, 2011 | Declaring a state of emergency due to natural disasters and directing Oklahoma Department of Emergency Management to coordinate response | |
| 29 | 2011-27 | 790 | July 6, 2011 | Requiring all State flags flown at half-staff on July 6, 2011, in honor of US Army Private First Class Dylan J. Johnson | |
| 30 | 2011-28 | 791 | July 6, 2011 | Requiring all State flags flown at half-staff on July 8, 2011, in honor of former State Representative Rusty Farley | |
| 31 | 2011-26A | 793 | July 20, 2011 | Amending Executive Order No. 2011-26 | |
| 32 | 2011-29 | 794 | July 22, 2011 | Declaring a statewide emergency and temporarily suspending regulations of the Federal Motor Carrier Safety Administration | |
| 33 | 2011-30 | 795 | August 8, 2011 | Requiring all State flags flown at half-staff on August 9, 2011, in honor of US Army Specialist Augustus J. Vicari | |
| 34 | 2011-31 | 796 | August 8, 2011 | Requiring all State flags flown at half-staff on August 11, 2011, in honor of US Army Second Lieutenant Jered W. Ewy | |
| 35 | 2011-32 | 797 | August 11, 2011 | Requiring all State flags flown at half-staff on August 12, 2011, in honor of former State Representative Howard Cotner | |
| 36 | 2011-33 | 798 | August 12, 2011 | Requiring all State flags flown at half-staff on August 15, 2011, in honor of US Army Staff Sergeant Kirk A. Owen | |
| 37 | 2011-34 | 801 | August 12, 2011 | Requiring all State flags flown at half-staff on August 16, 2011, in honor of US Army Sergeant Anthony D.M. Peterson | |
| 38 | 2011-35 | 802 | August 19, 2011 | Requiring all State flags flown at half-staff on August 22, 2011, in honor of US Army Sergeant Jordan M. Morris | |
| 39 | 2011-36 | 803 | August 22, 2011 | Requiring all State flags flown at half-staff on August 26, 2011, in honor of US Army Second Lieutenant Joe L. Cunningham | |
| 40 | 2011-37 | 804 | August 22, 2011 | Requiring all State flags flown at half-staff on August 25, 2011, in honor of US Army First Lieutenant Damon T. Leehan | |
| 41 | 2011-38 | 805 | August 23, 2011 | Requiring all State flags flown at half-staff on August 26, 2011, in honor of US Army Specialist Johnua M. Seals | |
| 42 | 2011-39 | 806 | August 30, 2011 | Directing Oklahoma Office of Homeland Security and Oklahoma State Bureau of Investigation to jointly manage the Oklahoma Information Fusion Center | |
| 43 | 2011-40 | 807 | September 8, 2011 | Requiring all State flags flown at half-staff on September 11, 2011, in honor of the victims of the September 11 terror attacks | |
| 44 | 2011-41 | 808 | September 15, 2011 | Requiring all State flags flown at half-staff on September 16, 2011, in honor of US Army Private First Class Tony J. Potter Jr. | |
| 45 | 2011-42 | 809 | September 16, 2011 | Requiring all State flags flown at half-staff on September 19, 2011, in honor of US Army Sergeant Bret D. Isenhower | |
| 46 | 2011-26B | 810 | September 19, 2011 | Amending Executive Order No. 2011-26 | |
| 47 | 2011-29 | 811 | September 20, 2011 | Declaring a statewide emergency and temporarily suspending regulations of the Federal Motor Carrier Safety Administration | |
| 48 | 2011-43 | 812 | September 20, 2011 | Requiring all State flags flown at half-staff on September 23, 2011, in honor of US Army Specialist Christopher D. Horton | |
| 49 | 2011-43 | 813 | September 20, 2011 | Requiring all State flags flown at half-staff on September 26, 2011, in honor of US Army Sergeant Mycal L. Prince | |
| 50 | 2011-45 | 814 | September 30, 2011 | Establishing Oklahoma Centennial Botanical Garden Authority | |
| 51 | 2011-46 | 815 | October 5, 2011 | Requiring all State flags flown at half-staff on October 6, 2011, in honor of US Army Specialist Francisco J. Briseno-Alvarez Jr. | |
| 52 | 2011-11A | 816 | October 26, 2011 | Amending Executive Order No. 2011-11 | |
| 53 | 2011-47 | 817 | November 9, 2011 | Requiring all State flags flown at half-staff on November 10, 2011, in honor of US Army Private First Class Sarina N. Butcher | |
| 54 | 2011-48 | 818 | November 9, 2011 | Requiring all State flags flown at half-staff on November 10, 2011, in honor of US Army Specialist Christopher D. Gailey | |
| 55 | 2011-49 | 819 | November 9, 2011 | Requiring all State flags flown at half-staff on November 11, 2011, in honor of Veterans Day | |
| 56 | 2011-50 | 820 | November 9, 2011 | Declaring a state of emergency due to natural disasters and directing Oklahoma Department of Emergency Management to coordinate response | |
| 57 | 2011-51 | 821 | November 15, 2011 | Requiring all State flags flown at half-staff on November 15, 2011, in honor of former State Senate David Myers | |
| 58 | 2011-52 | 822 | November 15, 2011 | Requiring all State flags flown at half-staff on November 17, 2011, in honor of former State Senate Olin Branstetter and his wife Paula Branstetter and Oklahoma State University coaches Kurt Budke and Miranda Serna | |
| 59 | 2011-29B | 823 | November 18, 2011 | Amending Executive Order No. 2011-29 | |
| 60 | 2011-53 | 824 | November 15, 2011 | Requiring all State flags flown at half-staff on November 29, 2011, in honor of former Oklahoma County District Attorney Robert H. Macy | |
| 61 | 2011-54 | 825 | November 15, 2011 | Requiring all State flags flown at half-staff on December 7, 2011, in honor of the victims of the 1941 attack on Pearl Harbor | |
| 62 | 2011-50A | 826 | November 18, 2011 | Amending Executive Order No. 2011-50 | |
| 63 | 2011-55 | 827 | December 28, 2011 | Requiring all State flags flown at half-staff on December 30, 2011, in honor of former Langston University President Ernest L. Holloway | |

== Honors ==
Fallin has been honored with numerous awards, including Women in Communications' Woman in the News Award, induction into the Oklahoma Women's Hall of Fame, Clarence E. Page Award, induction into the Oklahoma Aviation Hall of Fame, 1998 Woman of the Year in Government and 1993 Legislator of the Year. She is also the recipient of the 2014 Golden Padlock Award from Investigative Reporters and Editors for her "dedication to secrecy around execution records." The award is shared with former Missouri Governor Jay Nixon.

== Personal life ==
Fallin married her first husband, Joseph Fallin, a dentist, in November 1984. She filed for divorce in December 1998, alleging physical abuse from him, while at the same time he accused her of having an affair with an Oklahoma Highway Patrol officer, which she and the officer both denied, according to court reports. In November 2009, she married Wade Christensen, an Oklahoma City lawyer. They have a total of six children in their blended family, one of whom—model, makeup artist, and musician Christina Fallin—was described as "the most interesting governor's daughter in the country" by a 2014 Washington Post article.

== Election history ==
August 23, 1994, Lieutenant Governor of Oklahoma Republican primary results

| Candidates | Party | Votes | % |
|---|---|---|---|
| Terry Theresa Neese | Republican | 73,336 | 37.57 |
| Mary Fallin | Republican | 69,785 | 35.75 |
| Ronnie Eisenhour | Republican | 52,081 | 26.68 |

September 20, 1994, Lieutenant Governor of Oklahoma Republican primary runoff results

| Candidates | Party | Votes | % |
|---|---|---|---|
| Mary Fallin | Republican | 67,000 | 52.97 |
| Terry Theresa Neese | Republican | 59,488 | 47.03 |

November 8, 1994, Lieutenant Governor of Oklahoma election results

| Candidates | Party | Votes | % |
|---|---|---|---|
| Mary Fallin | Republican | 489,539 | 49.69 |
| Nance Diamond | Democratic | 435,215 | 44.18 |
| Bruce Hartnitt | Independent | 60,384 | 6.13 |

August 27, 2002, Lieutenant Governor of Oklahoma Republican primary results

| Candidates | Party | Votes | % |
|---|---|---|---|
| Mary Fallin | Republican | 168,461 | 81.96 |
| Jim Clark | Republican | 37,068 | 18.04 |

November 3, 1998, Lieutenant Governor of Oklahoma election results
| Candidates | Party | Votes | % |
|---|---|---|---|
| Jack Morgan | Democratic Party | 281,379 | 32% |
| Mary Fallin | Republican Party | 585,712 | 68% |
| Total | | 867,091 | 100% |
Source: 1998 Election Results

November 5, 2002, Lieutenant Governor of Oklahoma election results
| Candidates | Party | Votes | % |
|---|---|---|---|
| Laura Boyd | Democratic Party | 400,511 | 39% |
| Mary Fallin | Republican Party | 584,990 | 57% |
| E.Z. Million | Independent | 11,802 | 1% |
| Billy Maguire | Independent | 31,053 | 3% |
| Total | | 1,028,356 | 100% |
Source: 2002 Election Results

July 25, 2006 Republican primary results
| Candidates | Party | Votes | % |
|---|---|---|---|
| Mary Fallin | Republican Party | 16,691 | 35% |
| Mick Cornett | Republican Party | 11,718 | 24% |
| Denise Bode | Republican Party | 9,139 | 19% |
| Kevin Calvey | Republican Party | 4,870 | 10% |
| Fred Morgan | Republican Party | 4,493 | 9% |
| Johnny B. Roy | Republican Party | 1,376 | 3% |
| Total | | 48,267 | 100% |
Source: 2006 primary results

August 24, 2006, Republican primary run-off results
| Candidates | Party | Votes | % |
|---|---|---|---|
| Mary Fallin | Republican Party | 26,748 | 63% |
| Mick Cornett | Republican Party | 15,669 | 37% |
| Total | | 42,417 | 100% |
Source: 2006 run-off results

November 7, 2006, U.S. Representative, Oklahoma's 5th District election results
| Candidates | Party | Votes | % |
|---|---|---|---|
| David Hunter | Democratic Party | 67,293 | 37% |
| Mary Fallin | Republican Party | 108,936 | 60% |
| Matthew Woodson | Independent | 4,196 | 2% |
| Total | | 180,425 | 100% |
Source: 2006 Election Results

November 4, 2008, U.S. Representative, Oklahoma's 5th District election results
| Candidates | Party | Votes | % |
|---|---|---|---|
| Steven L. Perry | Democratic Party | 88,996 | 34% |
| Mary Fallin | Republican Party | 171,925 | 66% |
| Total | | 260,921 | 100% |
Source: 2008 Election Results

July 27, 2010 Governor of Oklahoma Republican primary results
| Candidates | Party | Votes | % |
|---|---|---|---|
| Mary Fallin | Republican Party | 136,477 | 55% |
| Randy Brogdon | Republican Party | 98,170 | 39% |
| Robert Hubbard | Republican Party | 8,132 | 3% |
| Roger Jackson | Republican Party | 6,290 | 3% |
| Total | | 249,069 | 100% |
Source: 2010 primary results Archived July 20, 2012, at the Wayback Machine

November 2, 2010, Governor of Oklahoma election results
| Candidates | Party | Votes | % |
|---|---|---|---|
| Jari Askins | Democratic Party | 409,261 | 40% |
| Mary Fallin | Republican Party | 625,506 | 60% |
| Total | | 1,034,767 | 100% |
Source: 2010 Election Results Archived August 13, 2012, at the Wayback Machine

June 24, 2014, Governor of Oklahoma Republican primary results

| Candidates | Party | Votes | % |
|---|---|---|---|
| Mary Fallin | Republican | 200,035 | 75.5 |
| Chad Moody | Republican | 40,839 | 15.4 |
| Dax Ewbank | Republican | 24,020 | 9.1 |

November 4, 2014, Governor of Oklahoma election results
| Candidates | Party | Votes | % |
|---|---|---|---|
| Joe Dorman | Democratic Party | 338,239 | 41% |
| Mary Fallin | Republican Party | 460,298 | 56% |
| Kimberly Wallis | Independent | 17,169 | 2.1% |
| Richard Prawdzienski | Independent | 9,125 | 1% |
| Total | | 824,831 | 100% |
Source: 2014 |-

== See also ==
- Government of Oklahoma
- 53rd Oklahoma Legislature
- 54th Oklahoma Legislature
- Governor's Council on Physical Fitness and Sports
- List of female governors in the United States
- List of female lieutenant governors in the United States
- Women in the United States House of Representatives

Party political offices
| Preceded by Terry Neese | Republican nominee for Lieutenant Governor of Oklahoma; 1994, 1998, 2002 | Succeeded by Todd Hiett |
| Preceded by Ernest Istook | Republican nominee for Governor of Oklahoma; 2010, 2014 | Succeeded by Kevin Stitt |
Political offices
| Preceded by Jack Mildren | Lieutenant Governor of Oklahoma; 1995–2007 | Succeeded by Jari Askins |
| Preceded by Brad Henry | Governor of Oklahoma; 2011–2019 | Succeeded by Kevin Stitt |
| Preceded by Jack Markell | Chair of the National Governors Association; 2013–2014 | Succeeded by John Hickenlooper |
U.S. House of Representatives
| Preceded by Ernest Istook | Member of the U.S. House of Representatives from Oklahoma's 5th congressional district 2007–2011 | Succeeded by James Lankford |
U.S. order of precedence (ceremonial)
| Preceded by Brad Henry as Former Governor | Order of precedence of the United States; Within Oklahoma | Succeeded by Jack Markell as Former Governor |
| Preceded by Brad Henry as Former Governor | Order of precedence of the United States; Outside Oklahoma | Succeeded by Toney Anaya as Former Governor |
