= Oklahoma Governor's Council on Physical Fitness and Sports =

The Oklahoma Governor's Council on Physical Activity and Sport is a council within the office of the governor of Oklahoma for the purpose of . In cooperation with the President's Council on Fitness, Sports, and Nutrition, originated in 1991 by Executive Order of then Governor David Walters.

== History ==
The Oklahoma Governor's Council on Physical Activity and Sport was established by Executive Order under then Governor Henry Bellmon in 1988 under Executive Order 91-10. The Honorable Mary Fallin continued the council in full force under Executive Order 2011-10 on April 8, 2011 in which she credits former Governor David Walters.

The Oklahoma council stemmed from the national initiatives of fitness established by then President Dwight D. Eisenhower. General Eisenhower's program, "President's Council on Youth Fitness," resulted from a n international study that reported American children were less fit than children of other nations. John F. Kennedy furthered the effort by promoting University of Oklahoma football coach, Bud Wilkinson, to the position of Executive Director and distributing fitness manuals to schools across the country. It was President Kennedy's aggressive promotion for national participation that prompted Oklahoma to establish their own council within the Office of the Governor.

In 2005 Melissa Johnson, a spokesperson for then President George W. Bush, visited Tulsa to encourage Oklahoma residents to participate in the President's Challenge, an online-based resource for becoming more physically fit.

First Lady Michelle Obama renamed the national program to the President's Council on Fitness, Sports, and Nutrition to emphasize the importance of quality nutrition alongside physical activity. The national program continues to promote the President's Fitness Award and operates under the "Let's Move" campaign, which features co-chairpersons Drew Brees, NFL quarterback and Super Bowl champion, and Olympic gymnast Dominique Dawes.

== Objectives ==
The Council cites the following organizational objectives:

- Enlist the active support and assistance of individual citizens, civic groups, private enterprise, voluntary organizations, and others in effort to promote and improve the fitness of all Oklahomans through regular participation in physical fitness and sports activities.
- Initiate programs to inform the general public of the importance of exercise and the link which exists between regular physical activity and such qualities as good health and effective performance.
- Encourage our State and local governments to emphasize the importance of regular physical fitness and sports participation.
- Seek to advance the physical fitness of children, youth, adults, and senior citizens by systematically encouraging the development of community recreation, physical fitness, and sports participation programs.
- Develop cooperative programs with medical, dental, and other similar professional societies to encourage the implementation of sound physical fitness practices and sports medicine services.
- Stimulate and encourage research in the areas of sports medicine, physical fitness and sports performance.
- Assist educational agencies at all levels in developing high quality, innovative health and physical education programs which emphasize the importance of exercise for good health.
- Assist recreation agencies and state sports governing bodies at all levels in developing "sports for all" programs that emphasize the value of sports to physical, mental and emotional fitness.
- Assist business, industry, government, and the labor organizations in establishing sound physical fitness programs to elevate employee fitness and to reduce the financial and human costs resulting from physical inactivity.

== Programs and events ==
As of April 2011, the Council promotes two programs across the state of Oklahoma:

- Safe, Fit, and Health Kids or "Oklahoma Kids 21st Century" offers the opportunity for schools to apply for an Olympic athlete to visit their school for a motivational speech on living an active lifestyle.
- Oklahoma Healthy and Fit Schools Scorecard enables school administrators, parents, teachers, and general citizens of Oklahoma to complete a questionnaire on a school's promotion of healthy options to students. The self-assessed measurement is taken annually by elementary, middle, and high school categories. Once completed the council offers advice for improvement and may award bronze, silver, or gold recognition based on the overall school score. No measurement guidelines are made available. According to the questionnaire, schools are measured on length of recess, meal offerings, opportunities for extracurricular physical activity, availability of programs to introduce families to physical activity, and physical education standards.

== Funding ==
The council was established as a 501c3 organization through Oklahoma Executive Order 91-10. in According to the 2012 Executive Budget, the Governor's Council on Physical Fitness and Sports receives no state funding. Staff working with the two programs both employed by the Oklahoma State Department of Health.

The council hosts an annual golf tournament as a fundraiser. The 10th Annual Oklahoma Governor's Cup is scheduled for May 12, 2011 in Edmond, Oklahoma. Promotional materials indicate proceeds from the tournament go toward the Oklahoma's Healthy and Fit Schools Scorecard program. Chesapeake Energy has served as title sponsor for the 2008, 2009, and 2010 tournaments.

== Similar state agencies to promote physical fitness ==
Forty states, including Oklahoma, have state agencies to advance physical activity among citizens within their state. Those states include: Alabama, Alaska, Arkansas, California, Colorado, Delaware, Florida, Georgia, Hawaii, Illinois, Indiana, Iowa, Kansas, Louisiana, Maine, Maryland, Michigan, Minnesota, Mississippi, Montana, Nebraska, New Hampshire, New Jersey, New Mexico, New York, North Carolina, North Dakota, Ohio, Pennsylvania, Rhode Island, South Carolina, Tennessee, Texas, Utah, Vermont, Washington, Wisconsin, West Virginia, Wyoming. In addition to these individual state councils on fitness, the New England Governors' Association has created the New England Coalition for Health Promotion and Disease Prevention.

The National Governors' Association issued a brief in June 2002 offering ways state government have made strides against sedentary lifestyles that lead to obesity. No Oklahoma program was referenced. Kentucky, Arkansas, and West Virginia all have passed legislation that supports council initiatives including sales tax on carbonated beverages and the phased elimination of junk food from school vending machines.
