= Summer Wesley =

American lawyer

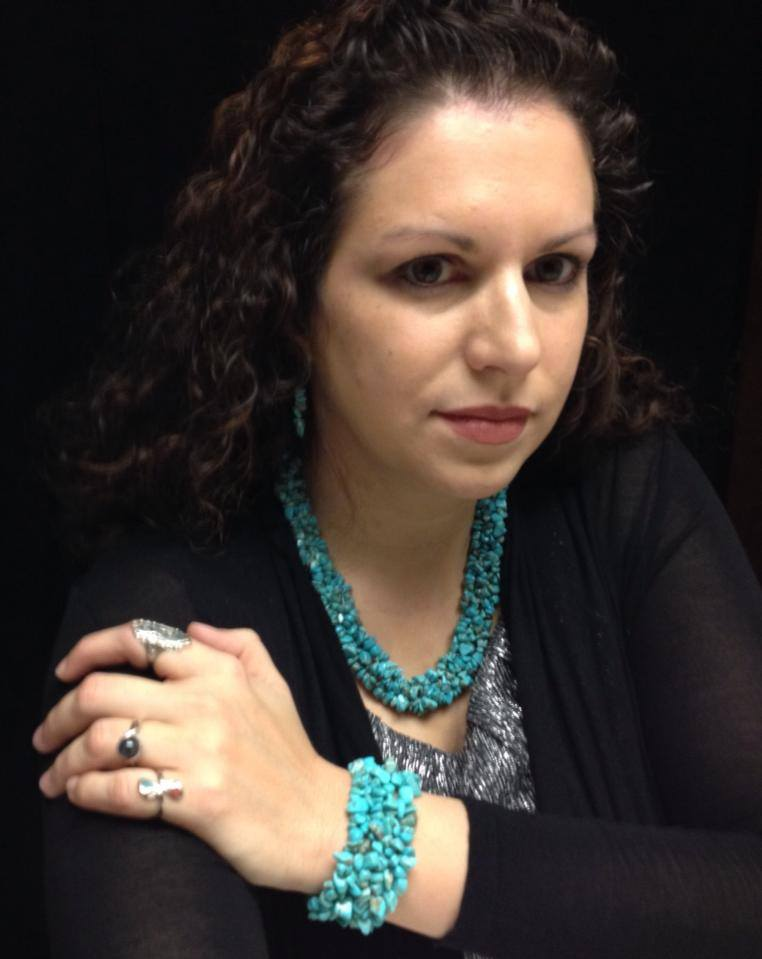
- Born: April 19, 1981 (age 45); Antlers, Oklahoma, U.S.
- Other name: Chahta Summer
- Education: University of Oklahoma, University of Oklahoma School of Law
- Occupations: Lawyer; Activist; Writer
- Political party: Democratic
- Children: 5
- Website: www.summerwesley.com

Summer Wesley (born 1981 in Choctaw), who also goes by Chahta Summer, is a lawyer, writer, and activist from Oklahoma. She is a member of the Choctaw Nation.

== Early life and education ==
Summer Wesley was born and raised in rural Southeastern Oklahoma and is a citizen of the Choctaw Nation. She attended school in the small town of Rattan, graduating high school a year early, in 1998.

Wesley earned four degrees from the University of Oklahoma: A Bachelor of Liberal Studies (2005), a master's in Administrative Leadership (2008), during which time she also completed the course requirements for a master's in Interprofessional Health & Human Services. She completed her Juris Doctor and Master of Arts in Native American Studies as part of a dual-degree program. Additionally, Wesley received a Certificate in American Indian Law.

== Writing ==
Wesley began writing early, publishing poetry while in her teens.

During law school, Wesley spent a semester as a writer for the Oklahoma Journal of Law & Technology (OKJOLT) and was on OKJOLT's 2012–13 board of editors. Her published Master's thesis, "Trademarking Tradition: Intellectual Property and Native American Tribes" is deposited in the University of Oklahoma's Bizzell Library.

== Career ==
In 2012, Wesley interned at Oklahoma Indian Legal Services, where she developed her skills in Federal Indian Law and the Indian Child Welfare Act. Since graduating law school, Wesley has been an advocate for Indian Country and has represented clients in tribal courts.

== Activism ==
Prior to attending law school, Wesley was active as a volunteer, frequently speaking to Scout groups about racism and stereotypical representations of Native Americans in popular culture.

In addition to her professional work representing Native Americans, Wesley has become an activist on several issues affecting her people. She has taken part in campaigns to eliminate race-based mascots for sports teams, as well as advocating for positive representations of Indigenous peoples.

Wesley is often quoted by her social media name of "Chahta Summer." She was featured in the National Congress of American Indian's 2014 #ProudToBe project.

In August 2014, Wesley criticized the Choctaw Nation's inviting Oklahoma Governor Mary Fallin to participate in their annual Labor Day Festival, stating: "Mary Fallin has demonstrated to not be an ally to Native tribes, yet has been chosen to not only appear at Choctaw Fest, but to unveil a statue in honor of our women . . .As a Choctaw woman, I am appalled that she is being given a platform for her insincere pandering and her participation in the unveiling causes the statue to lose all honor to me. Further, I think this sends the wrong message to Indian Country regarding the Choctaw Nation's priorities and loyalties. Fallin's participation implies that our Nation condones her anti-Native policies." As a result of the social media protests, the tribe pulled its announcement about the Fallin appearance from its website and all mention of the appearance was removed from Fallin's social media accounts. In the end, Fallin made an appearance at the festival to sign a tribal tag compact, and left without participating in the honors she had previously been invited to.

Days later, Wesley commented on the poor taste of Oklahoma State University students who made a banner with a flip reference to the Trail of Tears.

In September 2014 Wesley was quoted as criticizing Governor Fallin for cancelling a second scheduled meeting with the mother of Mah-Hi-Vist (Redbird) Goodblanket, a young Cheyenne Arapaho man who had been killed by police. Reporters found that Fallin staged a media event instead. Wesley was among Native American activists who expressed the belief that the Governor was sending "the message that the issue holds no importance to her. Indian Country had long felt that she is no ally, but this is a bigger issue. Police brutality affects all communities..."

In November 2014, Wesley used social media to report on the federal trial of Jason Merida, former Executive Director of the Choctaw Nation, who was convicted on all but one charge of counts of embezzlement of tribal funds and corruption. She criticized the media for not covering the trial adequately, leaving tribal citizens unaware of the serious case. She coined the hashtag #ChoctawCorruptionTrial and posted updates to various sites.

Also in November 2014, Wesley spoke out in support of three young rape victims from Norman, Oklahoma. They left school after being bullied following reporting the attacks on them.

Wesley was quite vocal in her support of the Oklahoma City Public School's decisions to end land run reenactments, as well as the board's vote to eliminate the "redskins" mascot used by Capital Hill High School. Wesley live-tweeted meetings on the topic and her account of a community educational forum on the topic was published.

Wesley ran as a Democrat in the 2020 state elections for the Oklahoma House of Representatives to represent District 100. She lost in the general election on November 3, 2020 to Republican incumbent Marilyn Stark.
