= Scott Biggs =

American politician

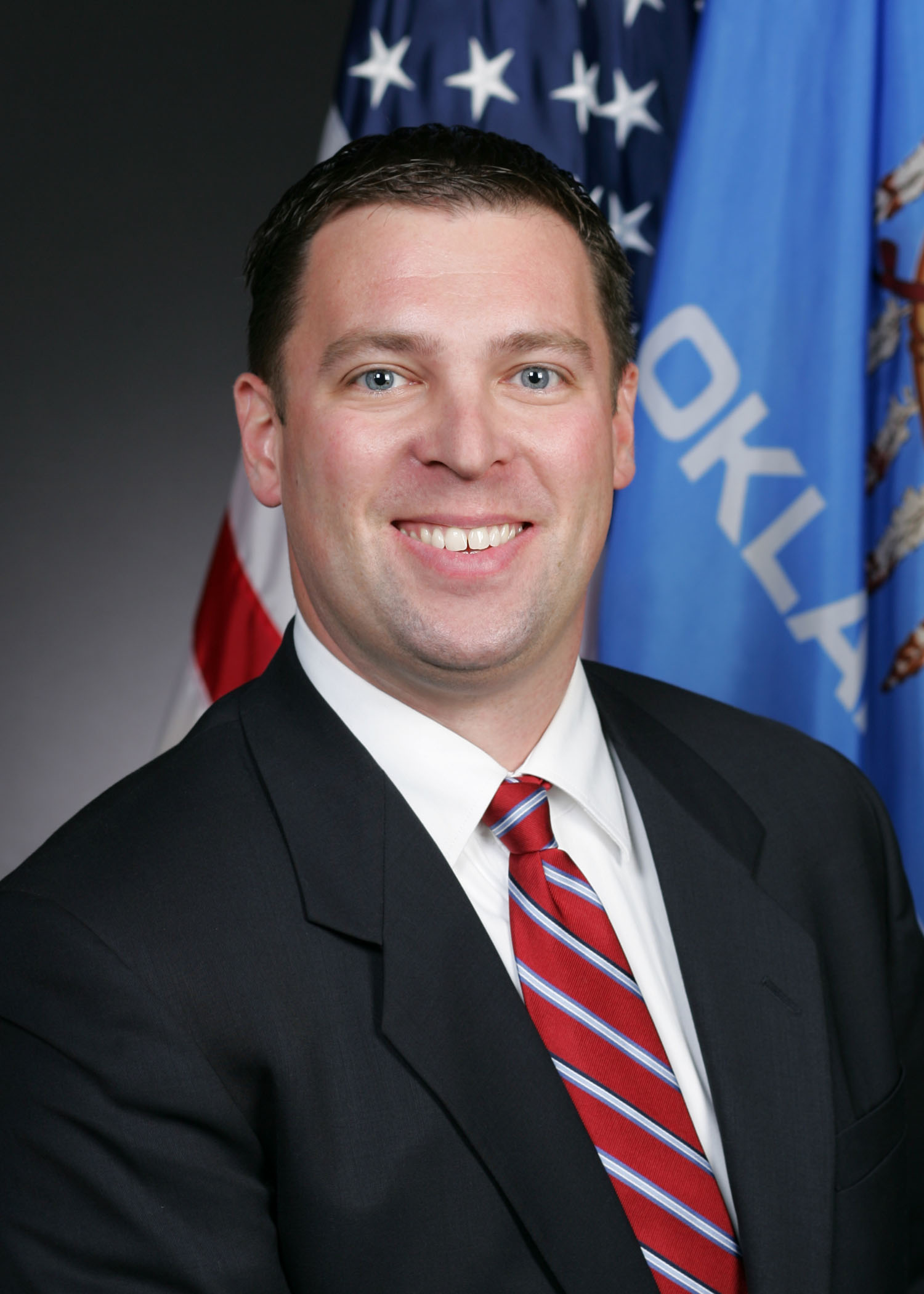
- Official portrait

Member of the Oklahoma House of Representatives from the 51st district
- In office November 14, 2012 – November 2, 2017
- Preceded by: Corey Holland
- Succeeded by: Brad Boles

Personal details
- Born: July 2, 1979 (age 47)
- Party: Republican

Scott Biggs (born July 2, 1979) is an American politician who served in the Oklahoma House of Representatives from the 51st district from 2012 to 2017.

== Early life, education, and family ==
Biggs graduated from Oklahoma State University with a bachelor's degree in agricultural economics and received a juris doctor from the University of Oklahoma College of Law in 2006. He is married and has two daughters.

== Oklahoma House ==
Biggs was elected to the Oklahoma House of Representatives in 2012 from the 51st district as a member of the Republican Party. He served until 2017.

In 2016, Biggs authored a measure that would have put State Question 777 on a state-wide ballot to lift a ban on cockfighting in the state. The bill was supported by the Oklahoma Farm Bureau and the Oklahoma Gamefowl Commission, while it was opposed by animal welfare groups and former Attorney General of Oklahoma Drew Edmondson. (Note: In 2002, "Oklahoma voters criminalized hosting, attending and raising birds for cockfighting events. State Question 687 received 56.2 percent support.")

== Post-legislative career ==
On November 2, 2017, Biggs was appointed as the Oklahoma state director of the Farm Service Agency.

Biggs was appointed to a six-year term on the Oklahoma Workers' Compensation Commission on August 26, 2021, by Governor Kevin Stitt. He also serves as an officer in the Oklahoma Air National Guard.

In December 2024, Biggs applied for a vacant Oklahoma Supreme Court seat through the Oklahoma Judicial Nominating Commission.
