= Joe Dorman =

American politician (born 1970)

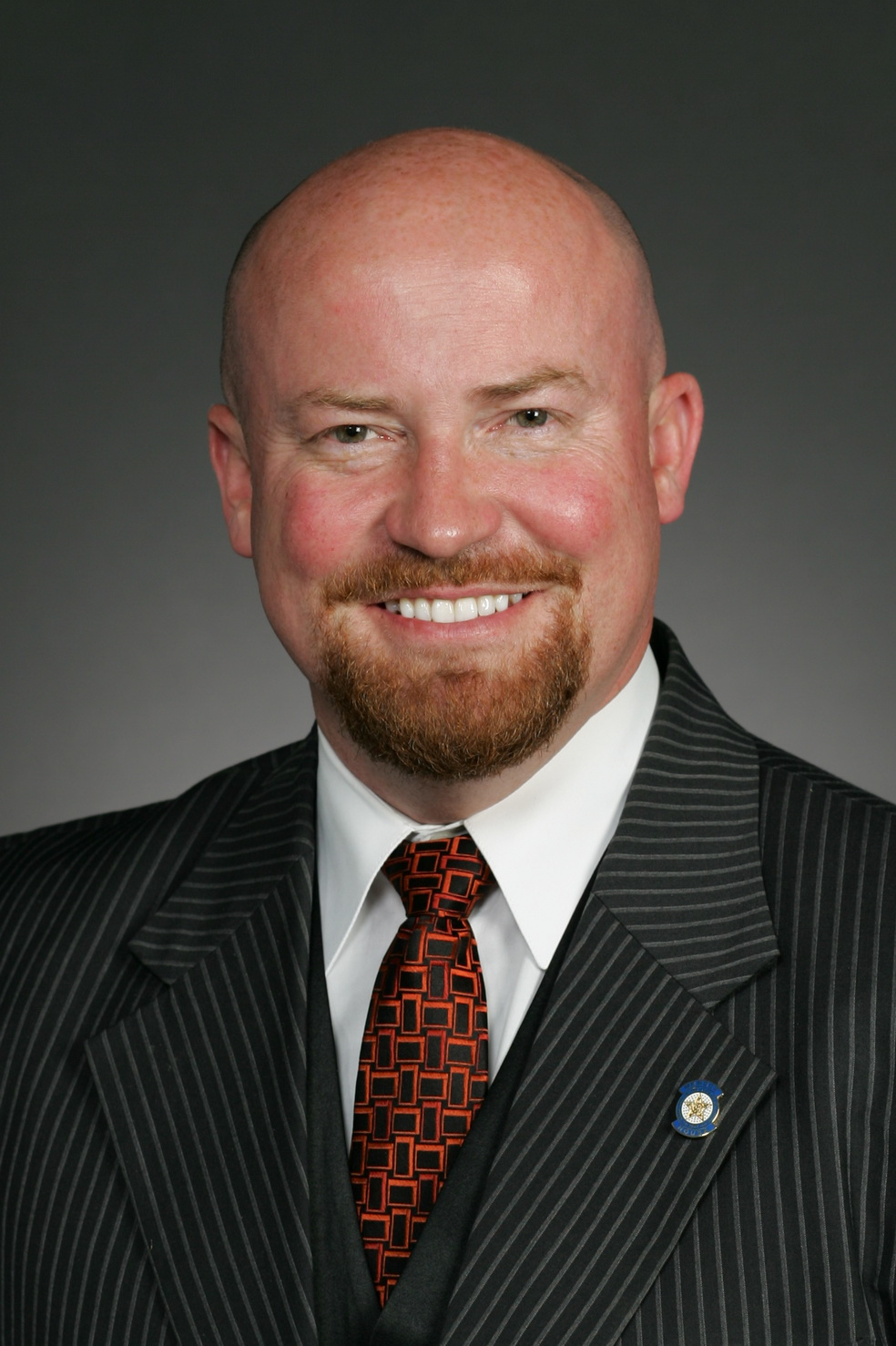

Member of the Oklahoma House of Representatives from the 65th district
- In office January 2003 – January 2015
- Preceded by: Jim Glover
- Succeeded by: Scooter Park

Personal details
- Born: September 18, 1970 (age 56) Burbank, California, U.S.
- Party: Democratic
- Education: Oklahoma State University, Stillwater (BA); University of Central Oklahoma
- Website: Official website

Joseph E. Dorman (born September 18, 1970) is an American politician who served in the Oklahoma House of Representatives, representing the 65th electoral district between 2002 and 2014. He is a member of the Democratic Party.

An Oklahoma State University alumni, Dorman served in numerous roles in the Oklahoma Intercollegiate Legislature and worked in the Oklahoma House of Representatives, before being elected to represent the 65th electoral district in 2002.

Dorman was the Democratic nominee for Governor of Oklahoma in the 2014 gubernatorial election, eventually losing to incumbent Mary Fallin. Major issues of his campaign include education and universal access to storm shelters in public schools.

== Early life and career ==
Dorman was born on September 18, 1970, to Bill and Jan Dorman of Rush Springs, Oklahoma. He graduated from Rush Springs High School and Oklahoma State University.

During his time at Oklahoma State University, Dorman was a member of Pi Kappa Phi fraternity and a member and chairman of the Oklahoma State University Student Government Association Student Senate. He also served in other leadership roles, including in various roles in the Oklahoma Intercollegiate Legislature.

Dorman is the only person in the history of the organization to be elected to every senior leadership position in the Oklahoma Intercollegiate Legislature, including governor, lieutenant governor, speaker of the house, and president pro tempore of the senate.

Prior to serving in the Oklahoma House of Representatives, he worked as a mail clerk and runner in the chamber in 1994. After serving in other staff positions, he served as an assistant to the executive director of the House Stand and helped create an educational component for the high school pages that rotate each week through the Capitol. The Pageville program remains a popular aspect of the page program for Oklahoma high school students.

Dorman worked in Washington, D.C. as the research director for the Democratic Legislative Campaign Committee for one campaign cycle, before returning to serve as Special Projects Coordinator for the Oklahoma House of Representatives. During that time, he served as the lead staff member for the Legislator Back to School Week Program, International Student Awareness Day, and the Pageville Mock Legislature. He also prepared a daily bill summary for House lawmakers.

He is the CEO of Oklahoma Institute for Child Advocacy (OICA).

== Political career ==
=== Oklahoma House of Representatives ===
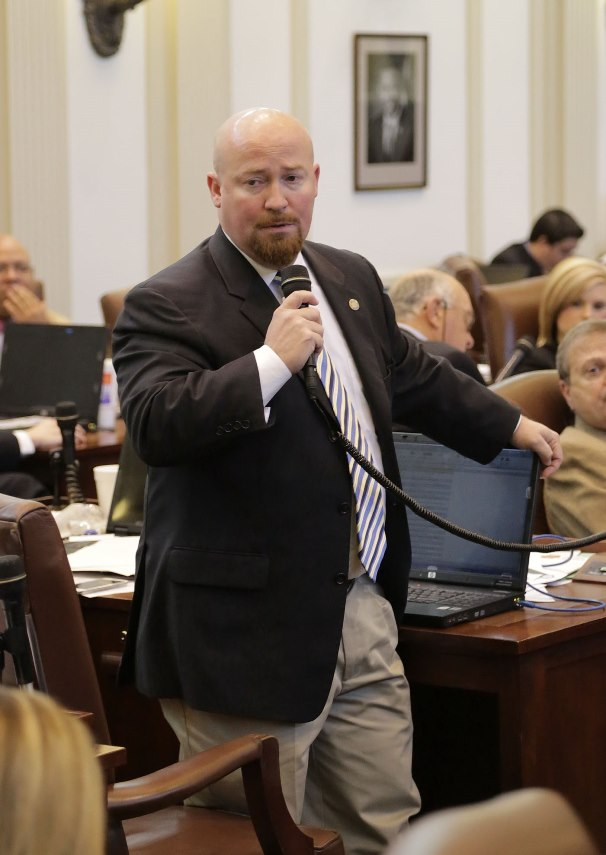
State Rep. Joe Dorman speaks to the members of the Oklahoma House of Representatives on March 14, 2013, in the House chamber.

Dorman resigned as an employee of the Oklahoma House of Representatives in 2002 to seek a seat in the chamber, representing a western Oklahoma electoral district following the retirement of long-term member and Speaker Pro Tempore Emeritus Jim Glover.

He currently served as the vice chair of the Democratic caucus in the Oklahoma House of Representatives and a member of the Sportsmen's Caucus.

=== Major legislation ===
==== Enacted ====
===== 2003–2004 =====
- Education – House Bill 1572 allowed money donated to schools to be accumulated from year to year, rather than force schools to spend that money in the same year it is received.
- Elections – House Bill 2677 modified candidate residency dates for elections.
- Firefighters – Senate Bill 1389 modified the Oklahoma home fire fighter pensions to insure spouses and children are protected to receive pension benefits.
- Medical examiners – Senate Bill 1522 required medical examiners to begin tracking sudden infant death syndrome.
- Mortgage Broker Licensure Act – House Bill 1574 created a mortgage broker licensing process and penalties in Oklahoma.
- Property – House Bill 2681 eliminated a law that required all land exchanges to involve commercial property.
- State Auditor – House Bill 1577 modified the duties of the Performance Audit Division of the Office of the State Auditor and Inspector.
- State Fire Marshal Commission – House Bill 2674 authorized the State Fire Marshal Commission to establish fees, fines, and administrative penalties for inspections; and plan reviews performed and for permits issued by the State Fire Marshal.
- Uniform Child Witness Testimony by Alternative Methods Act – House Bill 1635 granted judges the power to use an alternative testimony process if it is determined that the testimony could increase the emotional trauma of a child in trials.

===== 2005–2006 =====
- Emergency services – House Bill 1926 restricted the amount of money an EMS district can maintain from proceeds.
- Standards for Workplace Drug and Alcohol Testing Act – Senate Bill 1466 modified the Standards for Workplace Drug and Alcohol Testing Act by changing the acceptable samples and procedures and addressing unemployment benefits.

===== 2007–2008 =====
- Boat safety – House Bill 3076 defined what a passenger on a boat is as a person in or being towed behind a boat, and restricted modification on boats that exceed safety standards. The bill also required accidents in excess of $2000 to be reported.
- Controlled Burn Indemnity Fund – House Bill 1520 created the Controlled Burn Indemnity fund to assist land owners who incur losses from a controlled burn that inflicts damage when it goes beyond control.
- Official vegetable – House Bill 1669 made the watermelon the official vegetable of the State of Oklahoma.

===== 2009–2010 =====
- Early childhood education – House Bill 3126 required that the Oklahoma Partnership for School Readiness Board to also serve as the state's Early Childhood Advisory Council. The bill expanded the number of board members from fourteen to fifteen by adding the state director of Head Start Collaboration as a member of the board.
- Health care – House Bill 1658 exempted physicians from liability when they are providing voluntary medical services at a secondary school function.
- Pensions – House Bill 3128 allowed the death benefits of a retired state employee, paid by the Oklahoma Public Employees Retirement System, to be assigned by the beneficiary to a person licensed as a funeral director or to a lawfully recognized business entity to provide funeral services for the deceased member.
- Pensions – Senate Bill 859 authorized the modification of teachers benefits after marriage or other events to provide benefits for spouse following death.

===== 2011–2012 =====
- Deferred Deposit Lending Act – Senate Bill 1082 made the deferred deposit lenders database a sealed record in order to protect consumer information.
- Hospitals – House Bill 3074 required hospitals to have a lien, if the injured person asserts a claim against an insurer, for the amount of service upon any monies payable by the insurer to the injured person.
- Municipal government – Senate Bill 1075 restricted municipal officers or employees from engaging in certain transaction with the municipality and provided exemptions when competitive bids were obtained.
- Pensions – House Bill 2004 modified the language in statutes regarding death benefits paid by the Teachers' Retirement System of Oklahoma, including a clarification on the transfer of disclaimed benefits to the licensed funeral director or business entity required to provide funeral services for the deceased member.
- Tax checkoffs – House Bill 1998 provided for income tax check offs for donations to the "Domestic Violence and Sexual Assault Services Revolving Fund", the "Volunteer fire Department Revolving Fund", and the "Oklahoma Lupus Revolving Fund".

=== Oklahoma's 2014 gubernatorial election ===
Dorman served as the Democratic nominee for Governor of Oklahoma in the 2014 election, losing to Republican incumbent Mary Fallin.

== Community work ==
Dorman maintains an active role in the community. He is involved with the Lion's Club, Rotary International, Elks Club, the National Rifle Association of America, the OSU Alumni Association, the Oklahoma 4-H Board of Directors, O.I.L. Foundation Board, and Oklahoma YMCA Youth and Government Advisory Board.

He has organized the Rush Springs Watermelon Festival, and is a former director of alumni relations for the Oklahoma Intercollegiate Legislature (formerly the Oklahoma Inter-Collegiate and University Parliament).

Party political offices
Preceded by Jari Askins	Democratic nominee for Governor of Oklahoma; 2014	Succeeded by Drew Edmondson
