= Peachtree 25th Building fire =

1989 building fire in Atlanta

- Date: June 30, 1989
- Time: 10:25 a.m. EDT
- Location: 1718–1720 Peachtree Street, Atlanta, Georgia, United States; 33°48′3″N 84°23′36″W
- Type: Structure fire
- Cause: An electrical arc that occurred during the replacement of a fuse
- Deaths: 5
- Injuries: Up to 38
- Property damage: In excess of $2 million (equivalent to $5 million in 2025)

On June 30, 1989, a structure fire occurred at the Peachtree 25th Building, a high-rise office building in the Midtown neighborhood of Atlanta, Georgia, United States. The fire caused the deaths of five individuals and injured up to 38 others.

The fire began around 10:25 a.m. Electricians on the sixth floor of the building's South Tower had been replacing a fuse when an electrical arc occurred, leading to a fire that was localized mostly on that floor. While employees on other floors were able to evacuate and alert the city's fire department, several employees on the sixth floor were prevented from escaping. With some broke windows to allow for ventilation, and before firefighters arrived, one woman jumped, falling 60 feet (18 m), though ultimately surviving. Firefighters were able to rescue several people using long ladders, while others who reached the sixth floor began ventilating the floor. A rescue helicopter was additionally employed. In the end, four people were declared dead at the scene, while another died in hospital several days later.

Following the event, a significant amount of focus centered on the building's lack of a fire sprinkler system, as the building was constructed before any local ordinance existed that would have required the building to have one. Multiple individuals and organizations, including the National Fire Protection Association and the United States Fire Administration, investigated the disaster and made recommendations on requiring high-rises to have a sprinkler system in place, and in testimony before the United States Senate the following year, a vice president of the International Association of Fire Chiefs stated that a sprinkler system could have saved all but one of the lives lost in the fire.

== Background ==
The Peachtree 25th Building is an office building at the intersection of 25th Street and Peachtree Street, with a street address of 1718–1720 Peachtree Street, in the Midtown neighborhood of Atlanta, Georgia. The building consists of two symmetrical towers, the North Tower and South Tower, both containing ten stories and linked by a corridor containing the elevator lobbies between the two structures. The two towers were completed in 1962 (North Tower) and 1969 (South Tower) and are symmetrical, measuring 200 feet (61 m) on each side and containing a floor area of 19,000 square feet (1,800 m^{2}) per floor. A uniform glass façade gives the appearance that the two structures are one complete building. However, while some of the floors on both towers are linked through the elevator corridor to allow people to move between the two structures, this was not the case on all floors, including the sixth floor.

The building did not contain a fire sprinkler system at the time of its construction, as the local ordinance requiring such a system for a building containing more than eight stories was not enacted until several years after Peachtree 25th's construction. Additionally, no laws required buildings constructed prior to the ordinance's passing to add these systems. However, per Atlanta's building code at the time of its construction, which was based on the Southern Building Code, the building was designed with a minimum fire-resistance rating of two hours for its concrete floors and three hours for its columns. Additionally, each tower had two exit stairs on either end of the building, with standpipes present in both stairwells. In 1989, the building was not in any serious violation of any applicable fire code. At the time, the building primarily contained regional offices for several federal agencies, such as the National Transportation Safety Board. While the federal employees in the building were required to perform a fire drill once every three to four months, the private employees at Peachtree 25th were not required to participate, and many did not. At the time, the sixth floor was occupied entirely by private companies. In total, about 1,200 employees worked at the building.

== Fire ==
=== Ignition and spread ===
As June 30, 1989, was the Friday before the Independence Day weekend, only about 60 percent of the workers who were normally present at Peachtree 25th were there. On the sixth floor of the South Tower, there were about 40 employees in five offices. At around 10 a.m. EDT, a power outage occurred in the building, prompting three electricians to replace a fuse on an electrical conductor in the electrical closet of the sixth floor. When the replacement fuse was being inserted, there were some sparks and, eventually, a sustained electric arc. Someone who was working on the sixth floor at the time reported hearing several loud blasts coming from the hallway and saw a bright orange light. The electrician who had been handling the fuse suffered from a serious electrical injury. The arcing was intense enough that approximately 10 feet (3.0 m) of nearby busbar and bus duct were vaporized, while pressure generated from the arc damaged the metal door frame of the electric closet. The arc had additionally caused an intense fire, resulting in black smoke that began billowing through the hallways. This occurred around 10:25 a.m.

While the fire remained largely centralized on the sixth floor, the electrical closets on the fourth, fifth, and seventh floors also experienced some minor fire damage, while some smoke damage occurred in the fourth through tenth floors of the South Tower and the seventh and eighth floors of the North Tower. Workers on the seventh floor, after noticing flames coming from the door of their own electrical closet room, engaged the building's fire alarm system and began evacuating. While smoke had already began to accumulate in the front stairwell, the back stairwell was smoke-free, and ultimately, all people who were in the floors above the fire were able to evacuate. On the sixth floor, some employees remained in their offices, as their passageways were blocked by the fire or smoke, while some others began to smash windows for both ventilation and to alert authorities. Prior to the firefighters' arrival, one woman jumped from a smashed window, falling 60 feet (18 m) and landing on a nearby driveway. Ultimately, all of the occupants on that floor who had not left by the time the fire department arrived either died or were rescued by firefighters.

=== Emergency response and casualties ===
The Atlanta Fire Department received an alarm for the fire at around 10:29 a.m. and sent out three fire engines, two fire trucks, an emergency medical services unit, and a battalion chief. However, the department was soon flooded with over 20 phone calls about the fire, prompting them to send additional assistance. By 10:35 a.m., the fire had been elevated to a two-alarm fire, and by 10:43 a.m., a three-alarm. Some firefighters used long ladders to reach the people on the sixth floor, while additional firefighters began to enter the building and ascend the stairway, assisting evacuees, including those who had experienced smoke inhalation, among other injuries. As firefighters made it to the sixth floor, they employed ventilation measures that included the use of fans and the breaking of additional windows. One stairway was kept smoke-free through the use of positive pressure ventilation. However, rescue efforts were complicated by the open plan layout of the building, the numerous locked offices that required door breaching, and the extreme heat and lack of oxygen, which required several rotations of firefighters. Firefighters noted that, despite the extreme amount of smoke and heat on the sixth floor, there was less fire than they expected, due in part to a lack of oxygen.

An Incident Command System was soon established with Deputy Fire Chief D. M. Chamberlin in the lead, while Acting Fire Chief T. M. Perrin provided the media with information. In addition to the fire department, other agencies that were involved in the emergency response included the American Red Cross, the Atlanta Fulton County Emergency Management Agency, the Atlanta Police Department, Georgia Power, the Metropolitan Atlanta Rapid Transit Authority, and several ambulance companies, among others. Additionally, a rescue helicopter was employed in the efforts, arriving at the scene about 30 minutes after the first firefighters had arrived. In total, the emergency response involved several dozen fire engines and over a hundred firefighters. Of the 40 or so people who had been in the sixth floor, many were able to leave before the fire prevented their exit, and all who remained were either rescued by firefighters or died. Roughly 12 people from the sixth floor were rescued. Concerning the entire building, the fire department assisted in rescuing about 200 people.

The fire killed five people, all of whom had been on the sixth floor. Three of these individuals had had resuscitation attempts performed on them, including one person who succumbed to their injuries at a hospital on July 3. Of these five, four were killed by either the smoke or the gases produced by the fire, while the fifth, the electrician who had handled the fuse that began the fire, was killed by fire. Up to 38 people were injured, with many hospitalized. (Note: Sources vary on the number of injured and hospitalized. Per the Associated Press, 38 people were taken to hospitals, while United Press International stated that 38 people suffered injuries, with only 20 people hospitalized. Meanwhile, The Atlanta Journal-Constitution reported that there were 30 injuries. A 2011 study on the fire, commissioned by the United States Fire Administration, stated that 29 people were injured, while on the low end, a 2009 book on firefighting gave a figure of 26 injured.) This included 6 firefighters, (Note: This number comes from a 2011 study on the fire commissioned by the United States Fire Administration. However, sources vary on the number of firefighters who were injured, with claims of 5, 6, and 7.) with four suffering from heat exhaustion, one from chest pains, and one from a cut on their arm. The woman who had jumped from the window before firefighters arrived suffered from two broken legs and other injuries, but ultimately survived, receiving treatment at Piedmont Atlanta Hospital.

== Aftermath ==
The fire caused over $2 million (equivalent to $5 million in 2025) in property damage. Atlanta Mayor Andrew Young called the event "the worst fire in my eight years in office". Following the fire, a great deal of emphasis was placed on how the absence of a sprinkler system had contributed to the disaster. Deputy Fire Chief Chamberlin was quoted after the incident as saying, "I have no problem professionally saying that if there were sprinklers I suspect it would have saved lives". Similar sentiment was echoed by Acting Fire Chief Perrin, who said, "If this building had have been sprinklered, maybe we would have had only one death". Perrin also stated that a 1982 inspection of the building showed that it "was a fire trap", as the report "noted several things out of the ordinary that needed to be take care of [sic]", though he offered no specifics. A year after the fire, David Hilton, a vice president of the International Association of Fire Chiefs, while testifying before the United States Senate over the Hotel and Motel Fire Safety Act of 1990, said the following regarding the Peachtree 25th Building fire:

The building was non-sprinkled. Had it been sprinkled, all the experts from the fire side even to the industry side said only one person probably would have died in that fire at the most.

The fire was investigated by both the National Fire Protection Association and the United States Fire Administration. Concerning lessons learned from the event, both stressed the role that the lack of sprinklers played. Additional recommendations from the latter also included mandatory fire drills in high-rise buildings, requiring fire departments to dispatch a full response team to even automated fire alarms received from high-rise buildings, and future consideration of building designs where potentially hazardous areas, such as electrical closets, are separated from the rest of the structure by fire resistive materials, among other things. As of 2016, the Peachtree 25th Building is still in operation.

== See also ==
- List of fires in high-rise buildings

== Sources ==
- Craighead, Geoff (2009). High-Rise Security and Fire Life Safety (3rd ed.). Oxford: Butterworth-Heinemann. ISBN 978-0-08-087785-3. OCLC 428525476.
- Jennings, Charles (March 2011). "Five-Fatality Highrise Office Building Fire". Major Fires Investigation Project. Technical Report Series (33). Conducted by TriData Corporation. United States Fire Administration.
