= Hotel and Motel Fire Safety Act of 1990 =

United States federal statute

- Long title: An Act to amend the Federal Fire Prevention and Control Act of 1974 to allow for the development and issuance of guidelines concerning the use and installation of automatic sprinkler systems and smoke detectors in places of public accommodation affecting commerce, and for other purposes.
- Acronyms (colloquial): HMFSA
- Nicknames: Hotel and Motel Fire Safety Act of 1989
- Enacted by: the 101st United States Congress
- Effective: September 25, 1990

Citations
- Public law: 101-391
- Statutes at Large: 104 Stat. 747

Codification
- Acts amended: Federal Fire Prevention and Control Act of 1974
- Titles amended: 15 U.S.C.: Commerce and Trade
- U.S.C. sections amended: 15 U.S.C. ch. 49 § 2201 et seq.

Legislative history
- Introduced in the House as H.R. 94 by Sherwood Boehlert (R–NY) on January 3, 1989; Committee consideration by House Science, Space and Technology, Senate Commerce, Science, and Transportation; Passed the House on November 17, 1989 (passed voice vote); Passed the Senate on August 4, 1990 (passed voice vote) with amendment; House agreed to Senate amendment on September 10, 1990 (agreed voice vote); Signed into law by President George H. W. Bush on September 25, 1990

Hotel and Motel Fire Safety Act of 1990 was established to acknowledge the evolving apprehension of fire safety criteria for the hospitality industry. The United States federal statute was an amendment to the Federal Fire Prevention and Control Act of 1974 implementing an adjunct promoting fire and life safety decrees for domiciles providing public accommodations.

H.R. 94 legislation was passed by the 101st U.S. Congressional session and enacted by the 41st President of the United States George H.W. Bush on September 25, 1990.

== Congressional Assessment ==
The U.S. Congress issued a proclamation related to fire and life safety safeguards with regards to hotel and motel dwellings.

(a) Legislative Findings —

(1) more than four hundred Americans have lost their lives in multi-story hotel fires over the last five years
(2) when properly installed and maintained, automatic sprinklers and smoke detectors provide the most effective safeguards against the loss of life and property from fire
(3) automatic sprinklers and smoke detectors should supplement and not supplant other fire protection measures, including existing requirements for fire resistive walls and fire retardant furnishings
(4) some local governments, State governments, and the hotel industry need to act more rapidly to require the installation and use of automatic sprinkler systems in hotels
(5) through the United States Fire Administration and the Center for Fire Research, the Federal Government has helped to develop and promote the use of residential sprinkler systems and other means of fire prevention and control

(b) Legislative Purpose —

(1) It is the purpose of this Act to save lives and protect property by promoting fire and life safety in hotels, motels, and all places of public accommodation affecting commerce

== Provisions of the Act ==
=== Hotel and Motel Fire Prevention and Control ===
==== State and Local Governments ====
Federal Fire Prevention and Control Act of 1974, 15 U.S.C. § 2201 et seq., is amended by the addition of the following sections.

==== Listings of Certified Places of Public Accommodation ====
(a) Submissions by States —

(1) Not later than two years after the date of enactment, each State shall submit those places of public accommodation affecting commerce located in the State which the Governor of the State or designee certifies meet the requirements of the guidelines
(2) Each State shall periodically update the list submitted which meet the requirements of the guidelines for those places of public accommodation affecting commerce

(b) Compilation and Distribution of Master List —

(1) Not later than sixty days after the expiration of the two year period, a national master list shall be compiled and published in the Federal Register of all places of public accommodation affecting commerce located in each State that meet the requirements of the guidelines and shall distribute such list to each agency of the Federal Government and take steps to make the employees of such agencies aware of its existence and contents
(2) National master list shall periodically be updated and compiled to reflect changes in the State lists submitted and shall periodically redistribute the updated master list to each agency of the Federal Government

==== Fire Prevention and Control Guidelines for Places of Public Accommodation ====
(a) Contents of Guidelines —

(1) a requirement that hard-wired, single-station smoke detectors be installed in accordance with National Fire Protection Association Standard 74 in each guest room in each place of public accommodation affecting commerce
(2) a requirement that an automatic sprinkler system be installed in accordance with National Fire Protection Association Standard 13 or 13-R, whichever is appropriate, in each place of public accommodation affecting commerce except those places that are three stories or lower

(b) Effect on State and Local Law —

The provisions shall not be construed to limit the power of any State or political subdivision thereof to implement or enforce any law, rule, regulation, or standard concerning fire prevention and control

==== Dissemination of Fire Prevention and Control Information ====
States shall be encouraged to promote the use of automatic sprinkler systems and automatic smoke detection systems, and to disseminate to the maximum extent possible information on the life safety value and use of such systems. Such steps may include, but need not be limited to, providing copies of the guidelines and master list compiled to Federal agencies, State and local governments, and fire services throughout the United States, and making copies of the master list compiled available upon request to interested private organizations and individuals

=== Adherence to Fire Safety Guidelines in Establishing Rates and Discounts for Lodging Expenses ===
(a) Studies or surveys conducted for the purposes of establishing per diem rates for lodging expenses shall be limited to places of public accommodation that meet the requirements of the fire prevention and control guidelines of the Federal Fire Prevention and Control Act of 1974. The provisions shall not apply with respect to studies and surveys that are conducted in any jurisdiction that is not a State as defined by the Federal Fire Prevention and Control Act of 1974
(b) The Administrator of the General Services Administration may not include in any directory which lists lodging accommodations any hotel, motel, or other place of public accommodation that does not meet the requirements of the fire prevention and control guidelines described in the Federal Fire Prevention and Control Act of 1974
(c) The Administrator of General Services Administration shall include in each Handicapped directory which lists lodging accommodations a description of the persons, access and safety devices, including appropriate emergency alerting devices, which each listed place of public accommodation provides for guests who are hearing impaired or visually or physically handicapped
(d) The Administrator of General Services Administration may take any additional actions the Administrator determines appropriate to encourage employees traveling on official business to stay at places of public accommodation that meet the requirement of the fire prevention and control guidelines described in the Federal Fire Prevention and Control Act of 1974

=== Establishment of Approved Accommodations Percentage for Federal Agencies ===
(a) Approved Accommodations Percentage —

(1) Each agency shall ensure that its approved accommodations percentage for a fiscal year shall be not less than —

(A) sixty-five percent, for the first fiscal year that begins four years after the date of enactment of this Act
(B) seventy-five percent, for the fiscal year that begins five years after the date of enactment of this Act
(C) ninety percent, for the fiscal year that begins six years after the date of enactment of this Act for each subsequent fiscal year

(2) An agency's approved accommodations percentage for a fiscal year is the percentage determined by multiplying one hundred by the quotient of —

(A) the total number of nights spent by civilian employees of the agency for which payment was made for lodging expenses incurred in any State at any approved hotel, motel, or other place of public accommodation not owned by the Federal Government; divided by
(B) the total number of nights spent by such employees for which payment was made for lodging expenses incurred in any State at any hotel, motel, or other place of public accommodation not owned by the Federal Government

(3) A hotel, motel, or other place of public accommodation is approved if it meets the requirements of the fire prevention and control guidelines described in the Federal Fire Prevention and Control Act of 1974

=== Prohibiting Federal Funding of Conferences Held at Non-Certified Places of Public Accommodation ===
(a) In General —

No Federal funds may be used to sponsor or fund in whole or in part a meeting, convention, conference, or training seminar that is conducted in, or that otherwise uses the rooms, facilities, or services of, a place of public accommodation that does not meet the requirements of the fire prevention and control guidelines described in the Federal Fire Prevention and Control Act of 1974

(b) Waiver —

(1) In General —

The head of an agency of the Federal Government sponsoring or funding a particular meeting, convention, conference, or training seminar may waive the prohibition as described

(a) if the head of such agency determines that a waiver of such prohibition is necessary in the public interest in the case of such particular event

(2) Delegation of Authority —

The head of an agency of the Federal Government may delegate the authority provided under paragraph (1)

(1) to waive the prohibition and to determine whether such a waiver is necessary in the public interest to an officer or employee of the agency if such officer or employee is given such authority with respect to all meetings, conventions, conferences, and training seminars sponsored or funded by the agency

(c) Notice Requirements —

(1) Advertisements and Applications —

(A) Any advertisement for or application for attendance at a meeting, convention, conference, or training seminar sponsored or funded in whole or in part by the Federal Government shall include a notice regarding the prohibition described
(B) The requirement described shall not apply in the case of an event for which a head of an agency of the Federal Government waives the prohibition

(2) Providing Notice to Recipients of Funds —

(A) Each Executive department, Government corporation, and independent establishment providing Federal funds to non-Federal entities shall notify recipients of such funds of the prohibition
