= Fire Research and Safety Act of 1968 =

- Long title: An Act to amend the Organic Act of the National Bureau of Standards to authorize a fire research and safety program, and for other purposes.
- Acronyms (colloquial): FRSA
- Enacted by: the 90th United States Congress
- Effective: March 1, 1968

Citations
- Public law: 90-259
- Statutes at Large: 82 Stat. 34

Codification
- Titles amended: 15 U.S.C.: Commerce and Trade
- U.S.C. sections created: 15 U.S.C. ch. 49 § 2201
- U.S.C. sections amended: 15 U.S.C. ch. 7 §§ 271-278f

Legislative history
- Introduced in the Senate as S. 1124 by Warren Magnuson (D-WA) on February 28, 1967; Committee consideration by Senate Commerce, House Science and Astronautics; Passed the Senate on August 16, 1967 (passed voice vote); Passed the House on February 8, 1968 (268-78, in lieu of H.R. 11284) with amendment; Senate agreed to House amendment on February 16, 1968 (agreed voice vote); Signed into law by President Lyndon B. Johnson on March 1, 1968

Fire Research and Safety Act of 1968 was a declaration for a panoptic fire research and safety program advocated by President Lyndon Johnson on February 16, 1967. The Act of Congress established a National Commission on Fire Prevention and Control while encompassing more effective measures for fire hazards protection with the potentiality of death, injury, and damage to property. The U.S. statute petitioned a nationwide collection of comprehensive fire data with emphasis on a United States fire research program, fire safety education and training programs, demonstrations of new approaches and improvements in fire control and prevention resulting in the reduction of death, personal injury, and property damage.

The S. 1124 legislation was passed by the 90th Congressional session and enacted by the 36th President of the United States Lyndon B. Johnson on March 1, 1968.

== Provisions ==
Public Law 90-259 was penned as two titles: Fire Research and Safety Program and National Commission on Fire Prevention and Control.

=== Title I - Fire Research and Safety Program ===
(A) The purpose of Title I is to authorize directly or through contracts or grants

(1) fire investigations to determine their causes, frequency of occurrence, severity, and other pertinent factors
(2) research into the causes and nature of fires, and the development of improved methods and techniques for fire prevention, fire control, and reduction of death, personal injury, and property damage
(3) educational programs to —

(A) inform the public of fire hazards and fire safety techniques
(B) encourage avoidance of such hazards and use of such techniques

(4) fire information reference services, including the collection, analysis, and dissemination of data, research results, and other information, derived from this program or from other sources and related to fire protection, fire control, and reduction of death, personal injury, and property damage
(5) educational and training programs to improve, among other things —

(A) the efficiency, operation, and organization of fire services
(B) the capability of controlling unusual fire-related hazards and fire disasters

(6) projects demonstrating —

(A) improved or experimental programs of fire prevention, fire control, and reduction of death, personal injury, and property damage
(B) application of fire safety principles in construction
(C) improvement of the efficiency, operation, or organization of the fire services

(B) The purpose of Title I is to support by contracts or grants the development, for use by educational and other nonprofit institutions

(1) fire safety and fire protection engineering or science curriculums
(2) fire safety courses, seminars, or other instructional materials and aids for the above curriculums or other appropriate curriculums or courses of instruction

Grants may be made only to States and local governments other non-Federal public agencies, and nonprofit institutions. Such a grant may be up to 100 percentum of the total cost of the project for which such grant is made.

=== Title II - National Commission on Fire Prevention and Control ===
The U.S. Congress found the United States to have an increasing proportation of the population dispersed in suburban and urban vicinities. The population geographics created a complex and frequently obscured approach for controlling and preventing destructive fires beyond local municipalities.

The purpose of Title II is to establish a commission to perform a thorough investigation and study of the demography and population dynamics in the United States. The commission is to develop a formulation for recommendations whereby the United States can reduce the destruction of life and property caused by fire in U.S. cities, communities, suburbs, and elsewhere.

==== Establishment of Commission ====
- The National Commission on Fire Prevention and Control is to be composed of twenty members.
- Secretary of Commerce, Secretary of Housing and Urban Development, and eighteen members are to be appointed by the President of the United States.
- The individuals appointed as members shall be eminently well qualified by training or experience to carry out the functions of the Commission, and shall be selected so as to provide representation of the views of individuals and organizations of all areas of the United States concerned with fire research, safety, control, or prevention, including representatives drawn from Federal, State, and local governments, industry, labor, universities, laboratories, trade associations, and other interested institutions or organizations. Not more than six members of the Commission shall be appointed from the Federal Government.
- The President shall designate the Chairman and Vice Chairman of the Commission.

== See also ==
- Federal Fire Prevention and Control Act of 1974
- Fire Research Laboratory
- Firefighting
- National Bureau of Standards
- Organic Act
- U.S. Flammable Fabrics Act
