= National Emergency Training Center =

United States government training site

National Emergency Training Center (NETC)
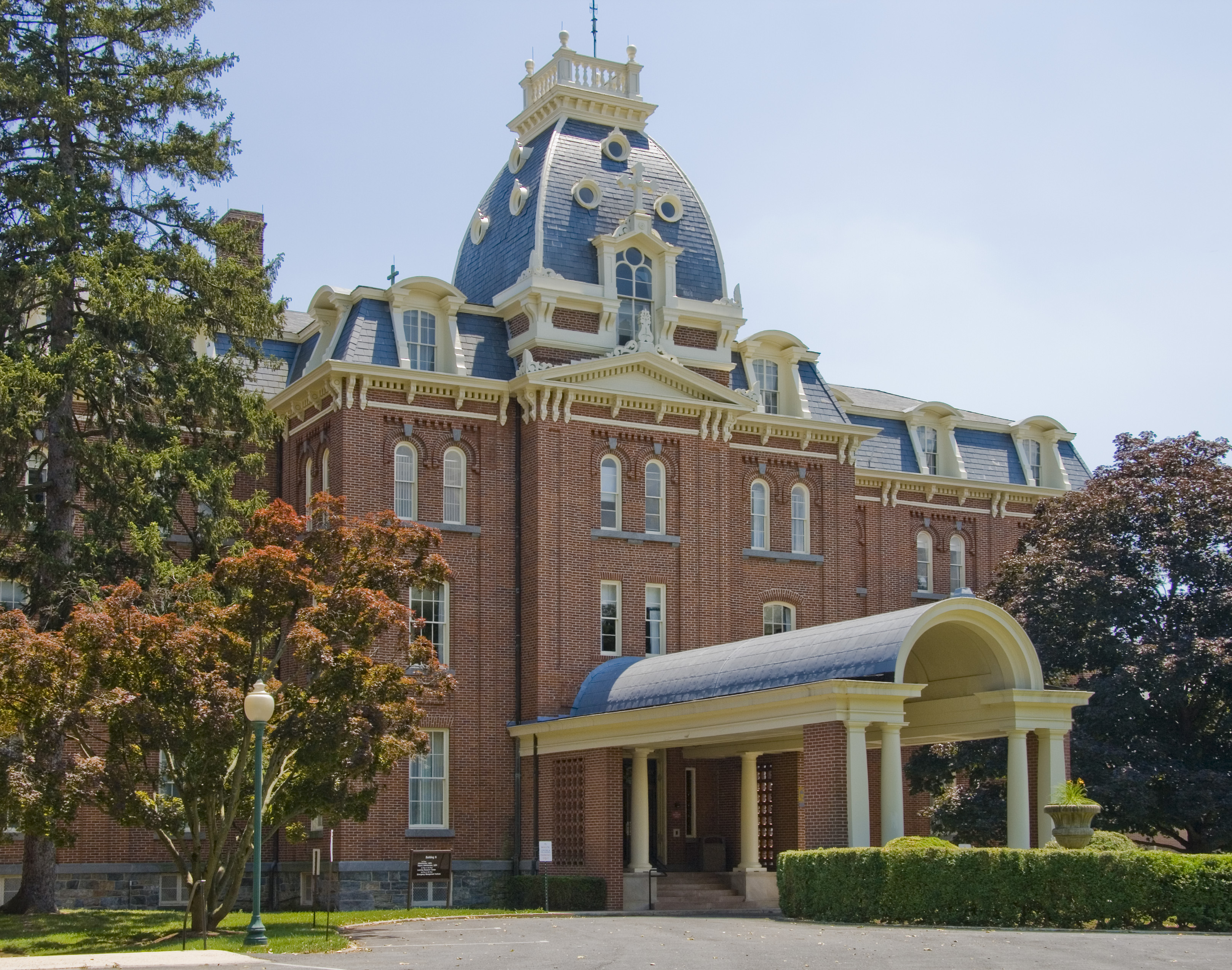
- The Burlando Building

Agency overview
- Formed: 1979
- Preceding agency: Saint Joseph College
- Headquarters: Emmitsburg, Maryland, U.S.
- Parent agency: Federal Emergency Management Agency
- Website: training.fema.gov

The National Emergency Training Center (NETC) serves as an interagency emergency management training body for the United States government. The college campus was purchased by the U.S. Government in 1979 for use as the National Emergency Training Center. NETC is home to the National Fire Academy, United States Fire Administration, Emergency Management Institute (EMI), which is operated by the Directorate of Preparedness branch of the Federal Emergency Management Agency (FEMA). The campus also includes the learning resource center (LRC) library, the National Fire Data Center, and the National Fallen Firefighters Memorial.

Both independently and by means of cooperative research and development agreements with the military and cooperative agreements with the technology companies and academic institutions, NETC also conducts research to identify methods for offering more effective training.

== Location ==
The NETC is headquartered at the former Saint Joseph College in Emmitsburg, Maryland and is approximately 55 miles northwest of Baltimore, Maryland.

== History ==
In June 1809, Elizabeth Ann Seton (later canonized as the first American Saint) had arrived in Emmitsburg, Maryland, and established the first parochial school for girls in the United States. Over the years, that school grew to become Saint Joseph College, a four-year liberal arts college for women. However, due to sagging enrollment numbers and rising operating costs, Saint Joseph College closed its doors and ceased operations in 1973. Students and faculty were merged with Mount Saint Mary’s University formerly a liberal arts men’s college located 2 miles (3.2 km) south of Emmitsburg on highway U.S. 15. Even after the school closed, The Sisters of Charity have continued Saint Elizabeth Ann Seton’s legacy of helping to educate children around the world.

On March 17, 1976, National Fire Prevention and Control Administration (NFPCA) Administrator Howard Tipton established a three-member Site Selection Board to research available properties and to make a recommendation for the permanent site of the newly created National Fire Academy. The Board was composed of Chairman David M. McCormack, first Superintendent of the National Fire Academy; John L. Swindle, Chief of the Birmingham, Alabama, Fire Department; and Henry D. Smith, Chief of Fire Service Training at Texas A&M University.

From a list of 200 proposals received from 39 states, the Board’s first choice was the former Marjorie Webster College in Washington, D.C. The Board placed the Saint Josephs College site in Emmitsburg as second. Also in consideration at that time was the Wards Island site in New York City.

Citing a limited size and lack of growth potential, Congress rejected the Webster College site recommendation. Following intensive lobbying on the part of U.S. Senator Paul Sarbanes and his delegation from Maryland, the Saint Joseph’s College site was selected in March 1979 by the Site Selection Board. Acting USFA Administrator Joseph A. Moreland approved the recommendation. The site selection was also endorsed by Gordon E. Vickery, nominated by President Carter to become Administrator of the USFA. Congress appropriated $6.15 million for the establishment of the National Fire Academy. In 1981, the facilities and campus were entered into the Federal register as the National Emergency Training Center.

== Parent agency and partners ==
The NETC's parent agency, the Federal Emergency Management Agency, supervises its administrative and financial activities.

As an interagency training organization, NETC has professionals from diverse backgrounds to serve on its faculty and staff. A number of the instructor staff are permanent NETC employees. Partner Organizations have input regarding training issues and functional aspects of the Center. FEMA takes part in curriculum review and development conferences and help develop policies and directives.
