= David A. Lucht =

American engineer and fire safety expert

David Allen Lucht
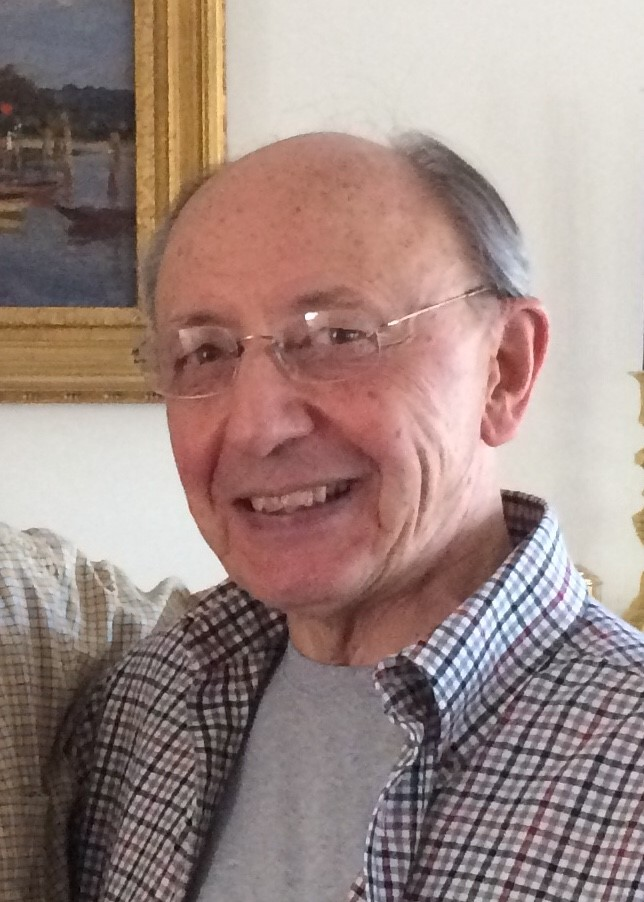

David Allen Lucht (/lʌkt/; born February 18, 1943) is an American engineer and fire safety expert. His career was devoted to public service in government, academia and the nonprofit sector. He served as the Ohio State Fire Marshal; the first presidential appointee to serve in the United States Fire Administration and the inaugural head of the graduate degree fire protection engineering program at Worcester Polytechnic Institute, where he served for 25 years

== Early years ==
David Lucht was born and raised in the rural village of Middlefield, Ohio. In 1960, local Fire Chief Earl Warne invited him to join the first class of student volunteer firefighters in the Middlefield Volunteer Fire Department where he actively served until graduating from high school in 1961. Early in his service, he responded to a residential fire in which three young children died, leaving an indelible imprint on him.

He attended the Illinois Institute of Technology in Chicago under a four-year scholarship granted by the Western Actuarial Bureau. He received his Bachelor of Science degree in fire protection and safety engineering in 1965. After graduating from IIT, he moved to Columbus, Ohio to work for his scholarship sponsor for three years.

== The Ohio State University ==
In 1968 Lucht moved on to the position of research associate at The Ohio State University Engineering Experiment Station, Building Research Laboratory, performing fire tests on building construction systems and materials.

An interest in home smoke alarms developed during his time at OSU, stimulated by the development of the first affordable devices by Duane Pearsall of Denver, CO. As chair of the Central Ohio Fire Prevention Association Household Fire Warning Study Committee, Lucht organized The Alton Road Tests aimed at demonstrating the effectiveness of home smoke detectors in actual dwellings.

After his career-long advocacy for home smoke alarms, he later described the early devices as "the most important technological [fire safety] breakthrough of the 20th century."

== Ohio State Fire Marshal ==
In 1972, Lucht joined the Ohio Division of State Fire Marshal where he authored the first Ohio Fire Code. Ohio Governor John J. Gilligan appointed him as the Ohio State Fire Marshal in 1973.

During his tenure in the Fire Marshal Division, Ohio adopted the first statewide requirements for home smoke detectors, developed the digital Ohio Fire Incident Reporting System, and the Ohio Arson Laboratory, and completed plans for the Ohio Fire Academy.

== United States Fire Administration ==
In 1975, President Gerald R. Ford appointed David Lucht Deputy Administrator of the United States Fire Administration (originally named the National Fire Prevention and Control Administration, NFPCA) after confirmation by the Senate. The new agency had been created by Congress in direct response to the landmark America Burning report of the National Commission on Fire Prevention and Control. He also served as acting head of the new agency until Howard Tipton was appointed to the Administrator post a few months later.

He played a key role in implementing the mandates of the Fire Prevention and Control Act. Areas of focus included the National Fire Academy, the National Fire Incident Reporting System, fire research and public education programs to support practitioners on the state and local level.

== Firepro Incorporated ==
Lucht moved to Massachusetts in 1978 at which time he assumed a new position as executive vice president with the consulting firm Firepro Incorporated. While at Firepro he simultaneously worked on the startup of a new graduate degree program at nearby Worcester Polytechnic Institute.

Firepro was a full-service fire protection engineering consulting firm, offering a full range of services ranging from building fire safety and incident reconstruction to corporate fire safety management and fire department organization and deployment studies.

== Worcester Polytechnic Institute ==
In 1978, David Lucht was recruited by Worcester Polytechnic Institute to start up the Center for Firesafety Studies. In the initial years as Professor and Director of the new Center, he worked in parallel as Executive Vice President of Firepro, Incorporated, a Boston area consulting engineering firm. He transitioned to full-time status at the university in 1985.

Starting “from scratch” at WPI, he assembled the resources, faculty, staff and laboratory facilities to support a first-of-its-kind program of graduate study in fire protection engineering. The Master of Science degree was first offered in 1979 and the PhD in 1991.

By the time he retired in 2005, WPI had graduated over 400 fire protection engineers from 26 countries. Graduates pursued careers in a host of employer settings ranging from consulting engineering firms, manufacturing industries and public utilities to product testing and research laboratories and codes and standards groups.

== Nonprofit governance ==
Lucht served on several nonprofit boards of directors and boards of trustees.

1985 – 1991 Society of Fire Protection Engineers (SFPE)
1987 – 1989 New England Chapter SFPE
1989 – 1991 American Association of Engineering Societies
1990 – 1999 National Fire Protection Association (NFPA)
1992 – 2003 Underwriters Laboratories (UL)
1995 – 2005 Ecotarium
2004 – 2012 CTC, Inc., Public Safety Technology Center
2004 – 2009 Worcester Art Museum
2004 – 2009 Master Singers of Worcester

== Honors, recognitions and awards ==
During his career, David Lucht was recognized for his leadership and contributions to fire safety.

1988 President's Award, SFPE Foundation
1988 Man of the Year Award, Automatic Fire Alarm Association
1989 Fellow, Society of Fire Protection Engineers
1993 Harold E. Nelson Service Award, Society of Fire Protection Engineers
2000 John J. Ahern President’s Award, Society of Fire Protection Engineers
2002 Arthur B. Guise Medal and Prize, SFPE Foundation
2004 Person of the Year Award, Automatic Fire Alarm Association
2004 William R. Grogan Award, WPI Alumni Association
2004 Person of the Year Award, New England Chapter, SFPE
2005 David A. Lucht Lamp of Knowledge Award (awarded annually by SFPE)
2006 David Rasbash Memorial Medal, Institution of Fire Engineers (London)
2013 John L. Bryan Mentor Award, Society of Fire Protection Engineers
2015 Cardinal High School Distinguished Alumni Hall of Fame, Middlefield, OH

2023 Doctor of Engineering honoris causa degree awarded by Worcester Polytechic Institute

== Selected publications ==
Selected publications are listed below. A full listing of 65 published and 49 unpublished works can be found in the WPI David Lucht Collection

- "Legal Requirements for Fire Alarms in Ohio Dwellings", Fire Journal, NFPA, March 1972.
- "NFPCA Designed to Assist Local, State Governments", Fire Engineering, August 1976.
- "The Federal Role Information, Training and Encouragement", Nation's Cities, March 1978.
- "Fire Prevention Planning and Leadership for Small Communities", (book) published by NFPA, 1980.
- "Fire Protection Engineering Graduate Program Takes Hold", Fire Journal, National Fire Protection Association, Vol. 78, No. 2, March 1984.
- "Emerging Fire Technology: A Wolf in Sheep's Clothing?" Chief Fire Executive, Vol. 1, No. 1, April/May 1986.
- "An Update on the WPI Graduate Program in Fire Protection Engineering", Fire Technology, Vol. 23, No. 3, August 1987.
- "Coming of Age", Journal of Fire Protection Engineering, Society of Fire Protection Engineers, Vol. 1, No. 2, April, May, June 1989.
- "Changing The Way We Do Business", Fire Technology, Vol. 28, No. 3, August 1992.
- "Progress in Professional Practice”, Fire Protection Engineering, Society of Fire Protection Engineers, Issue No. 3, Summer 1999.
- "Let’s be Intolerant of Fire Traps”, Op-Ed, Providence Journal, Providence, RI, August 5, 2003.
- "Issues and Opportunities for the Future of Fire Engineering”, 2006 Rasbash Honors Lecture, IFE Fire Prevention Fire Engineers Journal, July 2006
- "Millennials: The New Source of Young Talent”, Fire Protection Engineering Magazine, Society of Fire Protection Engineers, Fall 2007
- "The WPI Program: Starting from Scratch”, Fire Protection Engineering Magazine, Society of Fire Protection Engineers, Issue No. 53, First Quarter, 2012.
- "The Most Important Technological Breakthrough of the 20th Century”, Fire Protection Engineering Magazine, Society of Fire Protection Engineers, First Quarter, 2015.
- "Symposium Review and Conclusion", Proceedings of the Society of Fire Protection Engineers Symposium on Systems Applications, University of Maryland, College Park, Maryland; March 1981.
- "Report on the Conference on Firesafety Design in the 21st Century", WPI, Worcester, MA, June, 1999. Chairman and Editor.
- "Proceedings of the Second Conference on Firesafety Design in the 21st Century", Worcester Polytechnic Institute, June 2000. Chairman and Editor.
- "Making the Nation Safe from Fire Workshop: A Path Forward in Research”, National Research Council report, National Academy of Sciences, National Academies Press, Washington, D.C., 2003. (Editor and chair).

== Artist ==
In the years following his retirement in 2005, David Lucht's focus shifted to the arts. He enrolled in a range of art courses at the Worcester Art Museum and understudied several local artists. He actively participated in the Princeton Arts Society Portrait Group for many years. In 2016 Lucht was invited to paint the posthumous portrait of Philip J. DiNenno, who was President of Hughes Associates, and Fellow and Past President of SFPE when he died.

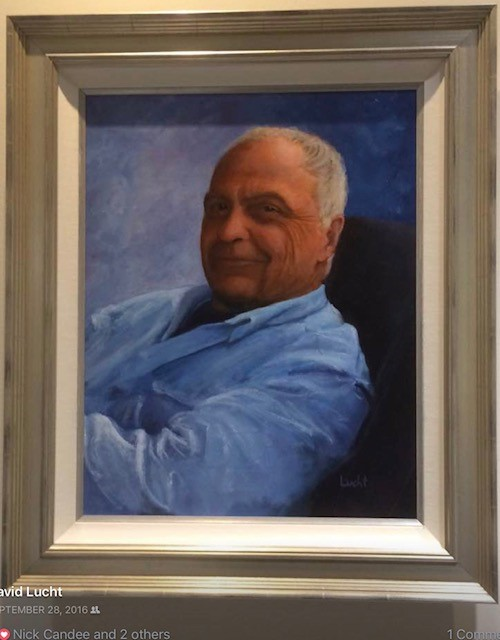
Philip J. DiNenno. Oil on Canvas. 16 in. x 20 in.
David A. Lucht, 2016

== Parkinson's advocacy ==
David Lucht was diagnosed with Parkinson's disease in 2012 and, with time, became active in the Parkinson's health movement. He participated in Parkinson's clinical research studies at UMASS Amherst, Boston University, MIT, and Worcester State University.

As an outgrowth of the UMASS Parkinson's Voice Study, Lucht and several other clinical participants started the Parkinson's Chorus of Central Massachusetts.
