= Federal Fire Prevention and Control Act of 1974 =

- Long title: An Act to reduce losses of life and property, through better fire prevention and control, and for other purposes.
- Acronyms (colloquial): FFPCA, FPCA
- Nicknames: Fire Prevention and Control Act
- Enacted by: the 93rd United States Congress
- Effective: October 29, 1974

Citations
- Public law: 93-498
- Statutes at Large: 88 Stat. 1535

Codification
- Titles amended: 15: Commerce and Trade
- U.S.C. sections created: 15 U.S.C. ch. 49 § 2201 et seq.

Legislative history
- Introduced in the Senate as S. 1769 by Warren Magnuson (D–WA) on May 9, 1973; Committee consideration by Senate Commerce, House Science and Astronautics; Passed the Senate on November 2, 1973 (62-7); Passed the House on April 29, 1974 (352-12, in lieu of H.R. 11989); Reported by the joint conference committee on October 2, 1974; agreed to by the House on October 9, 1974 (381-3) and by the Senate on October 10, 1974 (agreed); Signed into law by President Gerald Ford on October 29, 1974

Major amendments
- Hotel and Motel Fire Safety Act of 1990

The Federal Fire Prevention and Control Act of 1974 was created in response to the 1973 National Commission on Fire Prevention and Control report, America Burning. The report's authors estimated fires caused 12,000 deaths, 300,000 serious injuries and $11.4 billion in property damage annually in the United States, asserting that "the richest and most technologically advanced nation in the world leads all the major industrialized countries in per capita deaths and property loss from fire." The report proposed that a federal agency be established to help combat the growing problem of fatal fires happening throughout the country. The S. 1769 legislation was passed by the 93rd Congressional session and signed into law by U.S. President Gerald Ford on October 29, 1974.

== Provisions of the FPCA ==
The Act of Congress created a national superintendence for the administrative and organizational parameters of local and State government firefighting entities. The Act established the National Fire Prevention and Control Administration, National Academy for Fire Prevention and Control, National Fire Data Center, and the Fire Research Center.

=== Congressional Findings ===
Congress finds that —

(1) The National Commission on Fire Prevention and Control has made an exhaustive and comprehensive examination of the Nation's fire problem, has made detailed findings as to the extent of this problem in terms of human suffering and loss of life and property, and has made ninety recommendations.
(2) The United States has the highest per capita rate of death and property loss from fire of all the major industrialized nations in the world.
(3) Fire is an undue burden affecting all Americans, and fire also constitutes a public health and safety problem of great dimensions. Fire kills 12,000 and scars and injures 300,000 Americans each year, including 50,000 individuals who require extended hospitalization. Almost $3 billion worth of property is destroyed annually by fire, and the total economic cost of destructive fire in the United States is estimated conservatively to be $11,000,000,000 per year. Firefighting is the Nation's most hazardous profession.
(4) Such losses of life and property from fire are unacceptable to the Congress.
(5) While fire prevention and control is and should remain a State and local responsibility, the Federal Government must help if a significant reduction in fire losses is to be achieved.
(6) The fire service and the civil defense program in each locality would both benefit from closer cooperation.
(7) The Nation's fire problem is exacerbated by —

(A) Indifference with which some Americans confront the subject
(B) Nation's failure to undertake enough research and development into fire and fire-related problems
(C) Scarcity of reliable data and information
(D) Fact that designers and purchasers of buildings and products generally give insufficient attention to fire safety
(E) Fact that many communities lack adequate building and fire prevention codes
(F) Fact that local fire departments spend about 95 cents of every dollar appropriated to the fire services on efforts to extinguish fires and only about 5 cents on fire prevention

(8) There is a need for improved professional training and education oriented toward improving the effectiveness of the fire services, including an increased emphasis on preventing fires and on reducing injuries to firefighters.
(9) A national system for the collection, analysis, and dissemination of fire data is needed to help local fire services establish research and action priorities.
(10) The number of specialized medical centers which are properly equipped and staffed for the treatment of burns and there habilitation of victims of fires is inadequate.
(11) The unacceptably high rates of death, injury, and property loss from fire can be reduced if the Federal Government establishes a coordinated program to support and reinforce the fire prevention and control activities of State and local governments.

=== Establishment of the National Fire Prevention and Control Administration ===
The National Fire Prevention and Control Administration is authorized to educate the public and to overcome public indifference as to fire and fire prevention. Such steps may include, but are not limited to, publications, audio visual presentations, and demonstrations. Such public education efforts shall include programs to provide specialized information for those groups of individuals who are particularly vulnerable to fire hazards, such as the young and the elderly. The NFPCA shall sponsor and encourage research, testing, and experimentation to determine the most effective means of such public education.

=== Establishment of National Academy for Fire Prevention and Control ===
The purpose of the National Academy for Fire Prevention and Control shall be to advance the professional development of fire service personnel and of other persons engaged in fire prevention and control activities.

Program of the Academy —

(1) Train fire service personnel in such skills and knowledge as may be useful to advance their ability to prevent and control fires, including, but not limited to —

(A) Techniques of fire prevention, fire inspection, firefighting, and fire and arson investigation
(B) Tactics and command of firefighting for present and future fire chiefs and commanders
(C) Administration and management of fire services
(D) Tactical training in the specialized field of aircraft fire control and crash rescue
(E) Tactical training in the specialized field of fire control and rescue aboard waterborne vessels
(F) Training of present and future instructors in the aforementioned subjects

(2) Develop model curricula, training programs, and other educational materials suitable for use a to there educational institutions, and to make such materials available without charge
(3) Develop and administer a program of correspondence courses to advance the knowledge and skills of fire service personnel
(4) Develop and distribute to appropriate officials model questions suitable for use in conducting entrance and promotional examinations for fire service personnel
(5) Encourage the inclusion of fire prevention and detection technology and practices in the education and professional practice of architects, builders, city planners, and others engaged in design and planning affected by fire safety problems.

=== Fire Technology ===
Technology Development Program —

The NFPCA shall conduct a continuing program of technology development, testing, and evaluation of equipment for use by the Nation's fire, rescue, and civil defense services, with the aim of making available improved suppression, protective, auxiliary, and warning devices incorporating the latest technology. Attention shall be given to the standardization, compatibility, and interchangeability of such equipment. Such development, testing, and evaluation activities shall include, but need not be limited to —

(1) Safer, less cumbersome articles of protective clothing, including helmets, boots, and coats
(2) Breathing apparatus with the necessary duration of service, reliability, low weight, and ease of operation for practical use
(3) Safe and reliable auxiliary equipment for use in fire prevention, detection, and control, such as fire location detectors, visual and audio communications equipment, and mobile equipment
(4) Special clothing and equipment needed for forest fires, brushfires, oil and gasoline fires, aircraft fires and crash rescue, fires occurring aboard waterborne vessels, and in other special firefighting situations
(5) Fire detectors and related equipment for residential use with high sensitivity and reliability, and which are sufficiently inexpensive to purchase, install, and maintain to insure wide acceptance and use
(6) In place fire prevention systems of low cost and of increased reliability and effectiveness
(7) Methods of testing fire alarms and fire protection devices and systems on a non-interference basis
(8) Development of purchase specifications, standards, and acceptance and validation test procedures for all such equipment and devices
(9) Operation tests, demonstration projects, and fire investigations in support of the activities set forth in this section.

=== National Fire Data Center ===
The NFPCA shall operate, directly or through contracts or grants, an integrated, comprehensive National Fire Data Center for the selection, analysis, publication, and dissemination of information related to the prevention, occurrence, control, and results of fires of all types. The program of such Data Center shall be designed to —

(1) Provide an accurate nationwide analysis of the fire problem
(2) Identify major problem areas
(3) Assist in setting priorities
(4) Determine possible solutions to problems
(5) Monitor the progress of programs to reduce fire losses.

To carry out these functions, the Data Center shall gather and analyze —

(1) Information on the frequency, causes, spread, and extinguishment of fires
(2) Information on the number of injuries and deaths resulting from fires, including the maximum available information on the specific causes and nature of such injuries and deaths, and information on property losses
(3) Information on the occupational hazards faced by firefighters, including the causes of deaths and injuries arising, directly and indirectly, from firefighting activities
(4) Information on all types of firefighting activities, including inspection practices
(5) Technical information related to building construction, fire properties of materials, and similar information
(6) Information on fire prevention and control laws, systems, methods, techniques, and administrative structures used in foreign nations
(7) Information on the causes, behavior, and best method of control of other types of fire, including, but not limited to, forest fires, brushfires, fire underground, oil blowout fires, and waterborne fires
(8) Such other information and data as is deemed useful and applicable.

=== Fire Research Center ===
The Fire Research Center within the Department of Commerce was authorized with the mission of performing and supporting research on all aspects of fire with the aim of providing scientific and technical knowledge applicable to the prevention and control of fires, including —

1. basic and applied fire research for the purpose of arriving at an understanding of the fundamental processes underlying all aspects of fire,
2. research into the biological, physiological, and psychological factors affecting human victims of fire, and the performance of individual members of fire services, and
3. operation tests, demonstration projects, and fire investigations in support of the activities set forth in the Act.

== See also ==
- Fire Research and Safety Act of 1968
- Fire Research Laboratory
- National Commission on Fire Prevention and Control (1968-1973)
- America Burning (1973) -- report by National Commission on Fire Prevention and Control.
