= Structure fire =

Type of fire

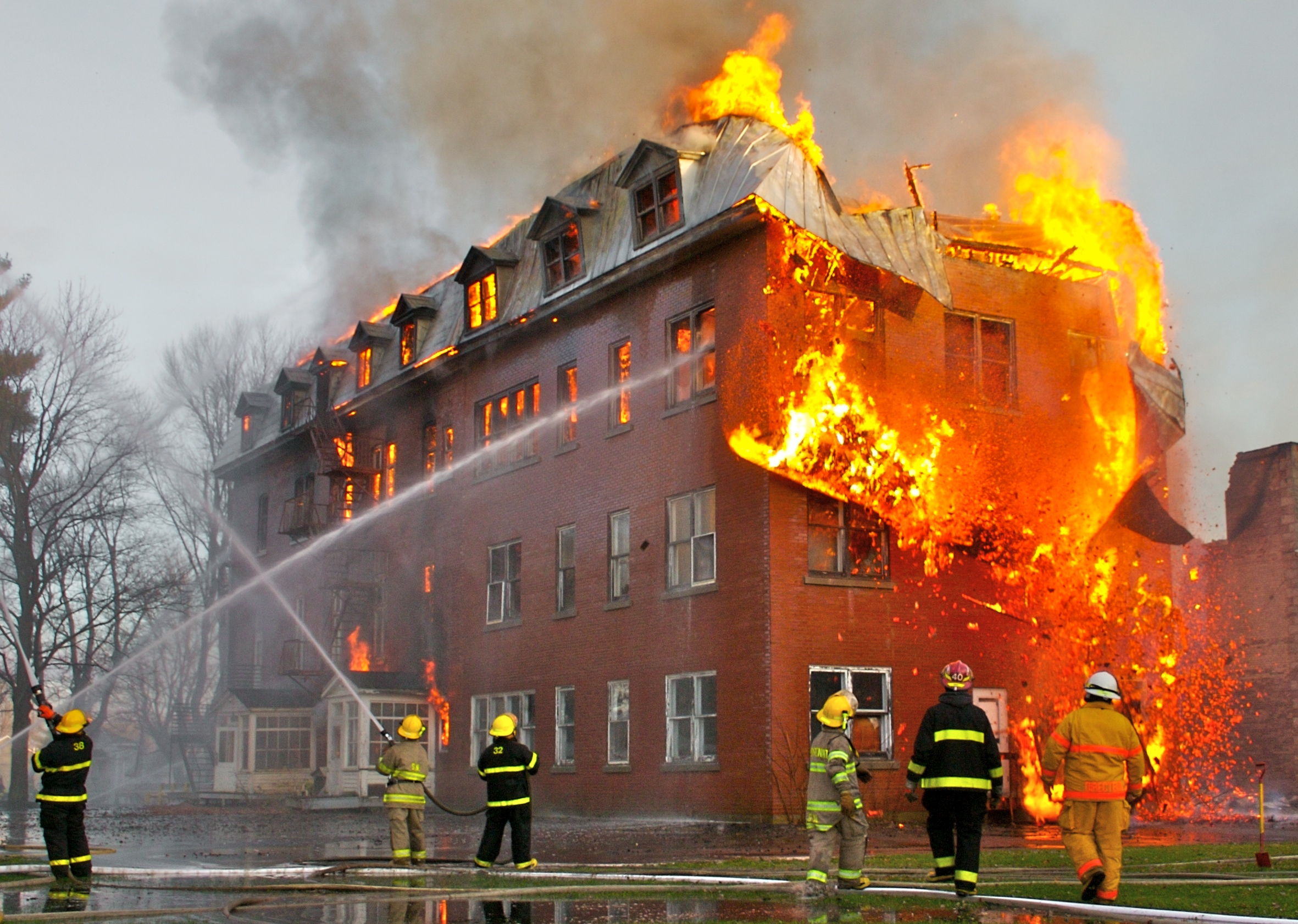
A structure fire in Massueville, Quebec, Canada

A structure fire is a fire involving the structural components of various types of residential, commercial or industrial buildings, such as barn fires. Residential buildings range from single-family detached homes and townhouses to apartments and tower blocks, or various commercial buildings ranging from offices to shopping malls. This is in contrast to "room and contents" fires, chimney fires, vehicle fires, wildfires or other outdoor fires.

Structure fires typically have a similar response from the fire department that include engines, ladder trucks, rescue squads, chief officers, and an EMS unit, each of which will have specific initial assignments. The actual response and assignments will vary between fire departments.

It is not unusual for some fire departments to have a predetermined mobilization plan for when a fire incident is reported in certain structures in their area. This plan may include mobilizing the nearest aerial firefighting vehicle to a tower block, or a foam-carrying vehicle to structures known to contain certain hazardous chemicals.

== Building Construction Types (United States) ==
In the United States, according to NFPA, structures are divided into five construction types based on the severity of the fire hazard:

Type I: Fire Resistive	Typically used in high-rises. The material comprising the structure is either inherently able to withstand significant exposure to fire (concrete), or in which a fire resistive covering is applied to steel structural members.
Type II: Non-combustible	Typically used in strip shopping center malls. Roofs are constructed out of steel rafters.
Type III: Ordinary construction	Brick and mortar walls, wood frame floors. City rowhouses are where this type of construction is most often found.
Type IV: Heavy timber	Often used in churches or other community-based buildings.
Type V: Wood frame	Typically used in recent construction of single-family dwellings, townhouses, garden apartments with four floors or less.

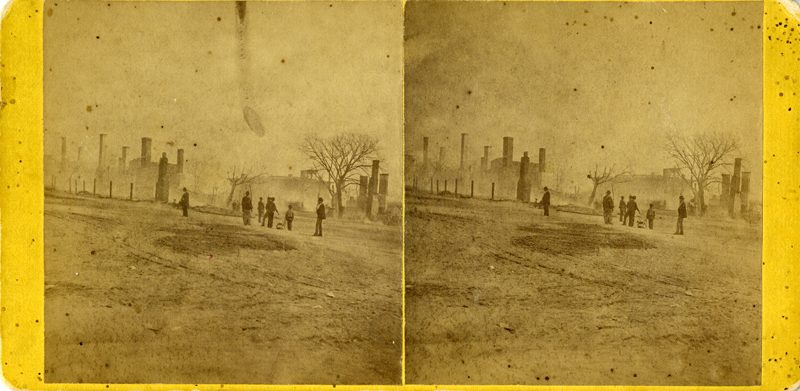
Remains of a structure fire on Cotton Avenue, Macon, Georgia, US. c. 1876

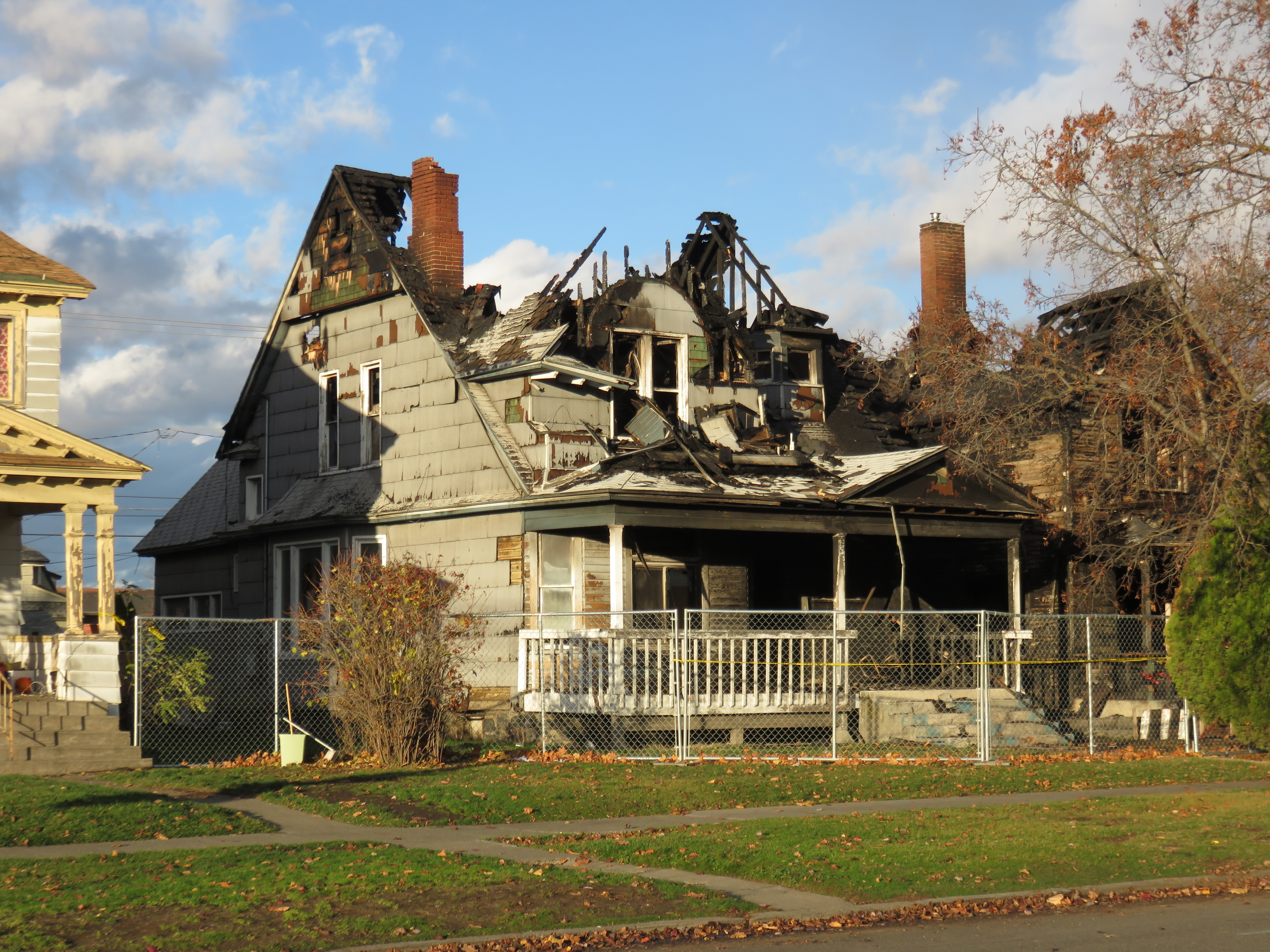
A burned-out house

== Causes of house fires ==
=== Canada ===
Information from Canada's National Fire Information Database shows these ignition sources for residential fires in 2014.

Residential fire sources of ignition, 6 jurisdictions, 2014
Ignition source	Examples	Percentage
Cooking equipment	stoves, hot plates, BBQs, deep fryers	33%
Smoker's material and open flame	cigarettes, lighters, matches, candles, lanterns, blow torches	24%
Heating equipment	central heating, space heaters, wood stoves, fireplaces	14%
Electrical distribution equipment	permanent electric wiring, extension cords, batteries	11%
Appliances and household equipment	televisions, household appliances	7%
Exposure	fire spread from other buildings or outdoors	7%
Other electrical equipment	power tools, lamps, computers	4%
No igniting object	lightning	1%

A 2023 update from Statistics Canada confirmed that cooking equipment and smoker's material continued to be the top causes of residential fires, at 32% and 25% of total incidents respectively.

=== United States ===
Data from the U.S. Fire Administration's National Fire Incident Reporting System shows that cooking has consistently been the leading cause of residential building fires.

Residential building fire causes, 2017-2019
Cause	Examples	Percentage
Cooking	stoves, ovens, cooking fires	50.9%
Heating	furnaces, boilers, water heaters, portable heaters, chimneys	9.3%
Other Unintentional, Careless	product misuse, discarded materials, heat source too close to combustibles	7.4%
Electrical Malfunction	electrical wiring, lighting fixtures	6.7%
Intentional	deliberately set fires	4.3%
Open Flame	candles, matches, lighters, embers	4.3%
Other Heat	fireworks, heat/sparks from friction	3.4%
Appliances	most electronic and electrical appliances	3.0%
Equipment Misoperation, Failure	equipment malfunction or operation deficiency	2.3%
Smoking	cigarettes and other smoking materials	2.0%
Exposure	heat spread from another hostile fire	1.8%
Natural	spontaneous ignition, chemicals, storms	1.7%
Other Equipment	computer, telephone, special or unspecified equipment	1.3%
Cause under investigation	cause still undetermined	1.3%
Playing with Heat Source	children or others playing with fire	0.4%

== See also ==
- Fire extinguisher
- Firefighting
- Fire prevention
- Fire safety
