= National Fire Incident Reporting System =

The National Fire Incident Reporting System (NFIRS) is a system established by the National Fire Data Center of the United States Fire Administration (USFA), a division of the Federal Emergency Management Agency. The System was established after the 1973 National Commission on Fire Prevention and Control report, America Burning, led to passage of the Federal Fire Prevention and Control Act of 1974 (P.L. 93-498), which authorizes the USFA to gather and analyze information on the magnitude of the Nation's fire problem, as well as its detailed characteristics and trends. The Act further authorizes the USFA to develop uniform data reporting methods, and to encourage and assist state agencies in developing and reporting data.

The NFIRS has two objectives: to help state and local governments develop fire reporting and analysis capability for their own use, and to obtain data that can be used to more accurately assess and subsequently combat the fire problem at a national level. To meet these objectives, the USFA has developed a standard NFIRS package that includes incident and casualty forms, a coding structure for data processing purposes, manuals, computer software and procedures, documentation and a National Fire Academy training course for utilizing the system.

The NFIRS reporting format is based on the National Fire Protection Association Standard 901, "Uniform Coding for Fire Protection" (1976 version), the 1981 codes for Fire Service Casualty Reporting, and the 1990 codes for Hazardous Materials Reporting. The version of NFIRS current as of June, 2006, version 5.0, was released in January, 1999. NFIRS 5.0 expands the collection of data beyond fires to include the full range of fire department activity on a national scale. It is a true all-incident reporting system.

Within the NFIRS states, participating local fire departments fill out the Incident and Casualty reports as fires occur. They forward the completed incidents via paper forms, computer media or the Internet to their state office where the data is validated and consolidated into a single computerized database. Feedback reports are generated and forwarded to the participating fire departments. Periodically, computer media containing the aggregated statewide data is sent to the National Fire Data Center at the USFA to be included in the National Database. This database is used to answer questions about the nature and causes of injuries, deaths, and property loss resulting from fires. The information is disseminated through a variety of means to states and other organizations. The National Fire Incident Reporting System is a model of successful Federal, State and local partnership. The database constitutes the world's largest, national, annual collection of incident information.

The success of NFIRS is due in part to the unique cooperative effort between USFA and the National Fire Information Council (NFIC). NFIC plays a vital role in the USFA's efforts to achieve an accurate nationwide analysis of the fire problem through support to NFIRS and its participating member states and metropolitan fire departments. NFIC's unique partnership of Federal, state and local participants has proven to be one of the most successful, productive and cost-beneficial programs ever attempted on a national level.

== Facts About NFIRS ==
- The NFIRS represents the world's largest, national, annual database of fire incident information.
- State participation in NFIRS is voluntary.
- 50 states and the District of Columbia report NFIRS data.
- 37 fire departments having a protected population of over 500,000 participate in NFIRS.
- Nationally over 23,000 fire departments report in the NFIRS each year.
- Participating departments report an average of twenty-three million incidents each year.
- Participating departments report an average of one million fires each year.
- The NFIRS database comprises roughly 75% of all reported fires that occur annually.

== Transition to NERIS ==
The National Fire Incident Reporting System (NFIRS) was replaced as the primary national fire and emergency incident reporting system in the United States by the National Emergency Response Information System (NERIS) on January 1, 2026.

NERIS is designed to provide more comprehensive reporting capabilities, including support for all-hazards incidents, real-time data submission, and improved data analysis tools for local, state, and federal agencies. For more information, see National Emergency Response Information System.
