= Fairness to Contact Lens Consumers Act =

United States federal law for contact lenses

- Long title: An act to provide for availability of contact lens prescriptions to patients, and for other purposes.
- Enacted by: the 108th United States Congress
- Effective: 4 February 2004

Citations
- Public law: Pub. L. 108–164 (text) (PDF)
- Statutes at Large: 117 Stat. 2024

Codification
- Titles amended: 15
- U.S.C. sections created: 15 U.S.C. §§ 7601–7610

Legislative history
- Introduced in the House as H.R. 3140 by Richard Burr (R-NC-5) on 23 September 2003; Committee consideration by Energy and Commerce; Passed the House on 19 November 2003 (406-12); Passed the Senate on 20 November 2003 (Unanimous Consent); Signed into law by President George W. Bush on 6 December 2003

The Fairness to Contact Lens Consumers Act (Pub. L. 108–164 (text) (PDF), 117 Stat. 2024, codified at 15 U.S.C. ch. 102 et seq.), also known as FCLCA, is a United States federal law that aims to improve consumer protection and ocular health for contact lens users.

== Provisions ==
The Act gives consumers certain rights, including increasing their ability to choose where to shop and the right to have a copy of their own contact lens prescription. It also imposed certain responsibilities on lens prescribers and sellers, and required the Federal Trade Commission to develop and enforce implementing rules, which it did in July 2004. The Act extended to contact lens wearers rights similar to those enjoyed by eyeglass wearers for 25 years before the adoption of the Act, especially in relation to ensuring competition in the market.

Under the Rule issued by the FTC, contact lens prescribers - defined as anyone permitted under state law to issue prescriptions for contact lenses, which include ophthalmologists, optometrists, and licensed opticians who are permitted under state law to fit contact lenses (sometimes called dispensing opticians) must give a copy of the contact lens prescription to the patient at the end of the contact lens fitting, even if the patient doesn't ask for it. Prescribers must also provide or verify the contact lens prescription to anyone who designated to act on behalf of the patient, including contact lens sellers. Prescribers are also barred from requiring patients to buy contact lenses, pay additional fees, sign waivers or releases in exchange for a copy of their prescription, or disclaim liability or responsibility for the accuracy of an eye examination.

In May 2025, the Federal Trade Commission sent warning letters to dozens of contact lens prescribers reminding them of their obligation to automatically provide prescriptions at the end of a fitting. The FTC noted that violations of the Contact Lens Rule may result in civil penalties of up to $53,088 per violation.

== Contention ==
Some contend that prescribers may, within the law, require patients to buy contact lenses prior to prescribing, thus skirting the intent of the Act. Per the FTC: “’Specialty’’ or custom-made lenses are sometimes necessary to complete the fitting process. To the extent these lenses are necessary to complete the fitting process, prescribers may charge patients for such lenses as part of the cost of the fitting process, and as such may condition the release of a contact lens prescription on payment of the fitting fee.”

Prescribers have expressed concern that they may be liable for defects in contacts provided by a third party. The law does not impose liability for this; liability is determined by state laws.

== Legislative history ==
The Act was introduced in the House of Representatives of the 108th Congress as H.R. 3140. Its long title is An act to provide for availability of contact lens prescriptions to patients, and for other purposes. It passed the House on November 19, 2003, and passed the Senate on November 20, 2003, and was enacted when President George W. Bush signed it into law on December 6, 2003, as Pub. L. 108–164 (text) (PDF)). It took effect on February 4, 2004. The Federal Trade Commission's notice of proposed rule-making appeared in the Federal Register on 4 February 2004, and FTC accepted comments from various organizations through 5 April 2004. Comments received by FTC included contentions over the stipulation relating to the time in which a prescriber needs to verify a lens prescription. The final ruling on the law was released by the FTC in July 2004. In October 2004, the FTC released a A Guide for Prescribers and Sellers.

The Act followed a surge in the use of contact lenses by Americans, which had been increasing ever since soft contact lenses became commercially available. The Act also followed a 1997 investigation by 17 state attorneys general that found that purchasers of contact lenses from eye care practitioners had no fewer ocular health problems than purchasers of contact lenses from other sources.
