= U.S. Flammable Fabrics Act =

- Long title: An Act to prohibit the introduction or movement in interstate commerce of articles of wearing apparel and fabrics which are so highly flammable as to be dangerous when worn by Individuals, and for other purposes.
- Acronyms (colloquial): FFA
- Nicknames: Flammable Fabrics Act
- Enacted by: the 83rd United States Congress
- Effective: June 3

Codification
- Titles amended: 15 U.S.C.: Commerce and Trade
- U.S.C. sections created: 15 U.S.C. ch. 25 § 1191 et seq.

Legislative history
- Introduced in the House as H.R. 5069 by Charles A. Wolverton (R–NJ) on May 7, 1953; Committee consideration by House Energy and Commerce, Senate Interstate and Foreign Commerce; Passed the House on June 3, 1953 (passed); Passed the Senate on June 18, 1953 (passed); Signed into law by President Dwight D. Eisenhower on June 30, 1953

The U.S. Flammable Fabrics Act (codified at 15 U.S.C. §§ 1191–1204) is an act that was passed by the 83rd United States Congress in 1953 by President Dwight D. Eisenhower, to regulate the manufacture of highly flammable clothing. It was enacted in response to many reports of rayon viscose fabrics that were quick to ignite, contain high-temperature fires and also causing illnesses and death in factory workers.

Rayon, better known as “artificial silk”, is classified as a semi-synthetic or regenerated fiber due to it comes from natural cellulose, but when put through chemical processing, it becomes a spinnable textile. It was originally patented in 1894 by English chemist Charles Frederick Cross and his collaborators, Edward John Bevan and Clayton Beadle. Rayon fabrics can become flammable with the mixture of carbon disulfide to convert cellulose into a viscose material conducive to threading for textiles. The introduction of carbon disulfide in the manufacturing process created a chemical reaction highly toxic to factory workers. By the 1920s the United States became the largest producer of Rayon and then by 1929 the United States was able to produce more the double what the second largest producer of rayon, Italy, could.

A series of deaths in the 1940s were caused by long rayon pile cowboy chaps or brushed rayon sweaters worn by children. The act initially assigned the Federal Trade Commission as its enforcement authority. In 1967, the responsibility was later transferred to the U.S. Consumer Product Safety Commission (CPSC) when the act was amended to include interior furnishings, paper, plastic, foam and other materials used in apparel and interior furnishings. At any point in time the CPSC has the authority to conduct product testing and investigations, order a recall of the fabric, and establish new regulations to ensure the handling by the consumer and the producer is done in a safe manor. A provision of the act makes willful violation a felony with maximum penalties of a $10,000 fine and three years in prison. The CPSC was given the authority under the act to issue mandatory flammability standards, which have been established for textiles, vinyl plastic film in clothing, carpets, rugs, children's sleepwear, mattresses and mattress pads.

The Flammable Fabrics act has had a significant impact throughout the United States. This act has led to the establishment of mandatory standards for textiles, Rayon fabrics, interior furnishings, and other daily use items. The act covers the protocol for standardized testing and labeling products to ensure that the consumer and the producer are handling these highly flammable textiles properly. This has forced the textile/fabric industry to invest more money into ensuring their fabrics are resistant to ignition and are cable of withstanding the spread of a flame. If this is unavoidable, the product must be labeled with the correct sticker. Shown to the right is an example of a flammable textile being sold in the state of California:

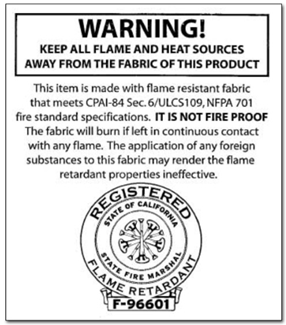
Example of a flammable textile being sold in the state of California from Foodtent.com

Examples of testing that can be performed under this act are a methenamine pill test or ASTM D2859, on carpets and rugs. This test uses a pill that is placed in the center of conditioned and over dried sample rug. The pill is then ignited under a controlled burn. Once the flame has become self-sustaining, the “char length” or distance the flame travels from the ignition point is measured. A rug specimen will achieve a passing score if the charred portion does not extend to within 25 +/- 0.5 mm of the edge of the hole in the steel frame at any point. This is a pass-fail test which means there is no “grey area”. Shown to the right is a picture of a methenamine pill test prior to the pill igniting.

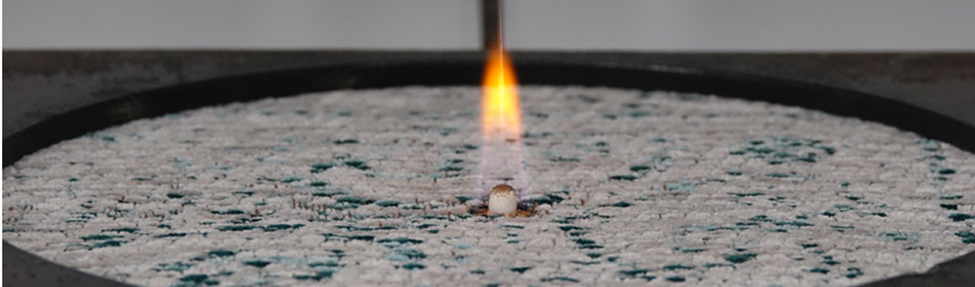
Picture of a methenamine pill test prior to the pill igniting from centexbel.be

When focusing on mattress or mattress pads, they shall be resistant to smoldering ignition (lit cigarettes) and to open flame. Standards, 16 C.F.R. part 1632 and 16 C.F.R. part 1633 explain how the mattress should react and control the release of heat energy within a 30-minute test period. These standards help manufacture stay within the legal limits and ensure public safety.

If a company is caught not following the proper procedures outlined by the U.S. Flammable Fabrics Act, they are subject to fines, confiscation of products, a public recall, etc. Violations can include unlawful selling and importation of prohibited fabrics. As of December 2025, retailers can face a civil penalty upwards of $121,000 per penalty with cap of $18.25 Million for related violations. If the retailer is aware of the infraction and does not take try to mitigate the offense, time in prison can be authorized for up to five years and treated as a felony. In addition to being placed in prison, the supplier is subject to fines if they are found to violate title 18 of the United States Code “A manufacturer or seller can defend against prosecution by establishing a good-faith guaranty from their supplier that the product meets the applicable flammability standard.”

== Amendment to 1953 act ==
The amendment of the act in 1967 was meant to further the initial intention of the U.S. Flammable Fabrics act by extending it to include the "prohibition of the introduction or movement in interstate commerce of articles of wearing apparel and fabrics which are so highly flammable as to be dangerous when worn by individuals, and for other purposes." The 90th United States Congress cleared Senate bill S. 1003 on December 1, 1967, and President Lyndon B. Johnson signed the bill on December 14. The amendment precipitated the Fire Research and Safety Act of 1968, which was tasked to study preventative methods against loss of life and injury by fire.
