= Poison Prevention Packaging Act of 1970 =

US law

- Long title: An Act to amend the Federal Hazardous Substances Act to provide for child resistant packaging to protect children from serious personal injury or serious illness resulting from handling, using, or ingesting a hazardous substance, and for other purposes.
- Nicknames: Federal Hazardous Substances Act Amendment of 1970
- Enacted by: the 91st United States Congress
- Effective: December 30, 1970

Citations
- Public law: 91-601
- Statutes at Large: 84 Stat. 1670

Codification
- Titles amended: 15 U.S.C.: Commerce and Trade; 21 U.S.C.: Food and Drugs
- U.S.C. sections created: 15 U.S.C. ch. 39A § 1471 et seq.
- U.S.C. sections amended: 21 U.S.C. ch. 9, subch. IV § 343; 21 U.S.C. ch. 9, subch. V §§ 352, 353; 21 U.S.C. ch. 9, subch. VI § 362

Legislative history
- Introduced in the Senate as S. 2162 by Warren Magnuson (D–WA) on May 6, 1970; Committee consideration by Senate Interstate and Foreign Commerce; Passed the Senate on May 11, 1970 (Passed); Passed the House on December 7, 1970 (Passed); Reported by the joint conference committee on December 15, 1970; agreed to by the Senate on December 16, 1970 (Agreed) and by the House on December 16, 1970 (Agreed); Signed into law by President Richard M. Nixon on December 30, 1970

The Poison Prevention Packaging Act of 1970 (PPPA); (Pub. L. 91-601, 84 Stat. 1670-74) was signed into law by U.S. President Richard Nixon on December 30, 1970. It was enacted by the 91st United States Congress. This law required the use of child-resistant packaging for prescription drugs, over-the-counter (OTC) drugs, household chemicals, and other hazardous materials that could be considered dangerous for children.

== Background ==
Before the PPPA was enacted, unintentional poisonings by both medicines and common household products were considered by most pediatricians to be the leading cause of injury to children aged 5 and under. At that time there were about 500 deaths per year being reported for children aged 5 and under due to accessibility of these chemicals. The purpose of the PPPA was to protect children from ingesting harmful chemicals and prescription medications by accident. After the PPPA was implemented, deaths in children aged 5 and under went down by 1.4 per million. This represented a reduction in the rate of fatalities, up to 45%, from projections of deaths without the presence of child-proof packaging and equated to an average of 24 fewer deaths in children annually.

In 1957, the National Clearinghouse for Poison Control Centers was established with the goal in mind to collect data from different individual poison control centers and provide them with the information needed on the many types of household products involved in childhood poisonings.

Some of the earliest attempts at controlling the problem of poisonings in children came about after World War II. In 1960, the Food and Drug Administration (FDA), in association with the American Medical Association (AMA), drafted what became known as the Hazardous Substances Labeling Act. This law stated that certain products, identified as "hazardous substances" within the meaning of the law, had to carry on their labels specific statements of caution.

== Exceptions and exemptions ==
There are some exceptions to the child-resistant packaging. There were concerns about accessibility of medications to the elderly and handicapped. As such, a manufacturer may package any over-the-counter household substance, subject to a PPPA standard, in a single-size package if the manufacturer also supplies such a substance in packages that comply with such a standard and if the packages of such substance that do not meet such standard bear conspicuous labeling stating: "This package for households without young children" (or "Package Not Child-Resistant" for small packages). As a result, with the exception of prescription drugs, manufacturers of certain household products that are regulated under the PPPA have the option of marketing one size in a conventional package as long as that same product is supplied in a popular-sized package, which is child-resistant.

Some of the main products that are exempted from the PPPA include the following:

- Powdered unflavored aspirin
- Effervescent aspirin
- Sublingual nitroglycerin
- Oral contraceptives
- Hormone replacement therapy
- Powdered iron preparations
- Effervescent acetaminophen
- Hydrocarbon-containing products where the liquid cannot flow freely

== Substances requiring special packaging ==
There is a long list of substances that fall under the authority of the PPPA. These substances include, but are not limited to

1. Aspirin. Any aspirin-containing product intended for oral administration by humans
2. Furniture polish. Non-emulsion type liquid furniture polishes containing 10% or more of mineral seal oil and/or other petroleum distillates, other than those packaged in pressurized spray containers.
3. Methyl salicylate. Liquid preparations containing more than 5% by weight of methyl salicylate, other than those packaged in pressurized spray containers.
4. Controlled drugs. Any product intended for human use that consists in whole or in part of any substance subject to control under the Comprehensive Drug Abuse Prevention and Control Act of 1970 and that is in a dosage form intended for oral administration.
5. Sodium and/or potassium hydroxide. Household substances in dry forms such as granules, powder, and flakes containing 10% or more by weight of free or chemically deneutralized sodium and/or potassium hydroxide.
6. Turpentine. Household substances in liquid form containing 10% or more by weight of turpentine.
7. Kindling and/or illuminating preparations. Prepackaged liquid kindling and/or illuminating preparations, such as lighter fuel for cigarettes, charcoal, torches, and others, which contain 10% or more by weight of petroleum distillates.
8. Methyl alcohol (methanol). Household substances in liquid form containing 4% or more by weight of methyl alcohol (methanol), other than those packaged in pressurized spray containers.
9. Sulfuric acid. Household substances containing 10% or more by weight or sulfuric acid, except substances in wet-cell storage batteries.
10. Prescription drugs. Any drug that is intended for human use that is in a dosage form intended for oral administration and that is required by Federal law to be dispensed only by or upon an oral or written prescription of a practitioner licensed by law to administer such drug except for the following:
  1. Sublingual and chewable forms of isosorbide dinitrate in dosage strengths of 10 mg or less.
  2. Erythromycin ethylsuccinate granules for oral suspension and oral suspensions in packages containing no more than 8 grams of the equivalent of erythromycin.
  3. Anhydrous cholestyramine in powder form.
  4. All unit dose forms of potassium supplements, including individually wrapped effervescent tablets, unit dose vials of liquid potassium, and powdered potassium in unit-dose packets containing no more than 50 milliequivalents of potassium per unit dose.
  5. Sodium fluoride drug preparations including liquid and tablet forms containing no more than 110 mg of sodium fluoride per package.
  6. Betamethasone tablets packaged in manufacturers' dispenser packages containing no more than 12.6 mg of betamethasone.
  7. Prednisone in tablet form, when dispensed in packages containing no more than 105 mg.
  8. Methylprednisone in tablet form in packages containing no more than 84 mg of the drug.
  9. Colestipol in powder form in packages containing no more than 5 grams of the drug.
  10. Conjugated estrogen tablets when dispensed in mnemonic packages containing no more than 32 mg of the drug.
11. Ethylene glycol. Household substances in liquid form containing 10% or more by weight of ethylene glycol packaged on or after June 1, 1974.
12. Acetaminophen. Any product that is intended for human use in a dosage form intended for oral administration and containing in a single package a total of more than 1 gram of acetaminophen except for the following:
  1. Unflavored acetaminophen containing preparations in powder form, other than those intended for pediatric use, that are packaged in unit doses providing no more than 13 grains of acetaminophen per unit dose.
13. Ibuprofen. Any product that is intended for human use in a dosage form intended for oral administration and containing 1 gram or more of ibuprofen in a single package.
