= G. Keith Bryant =

American firefighter (born 1959)

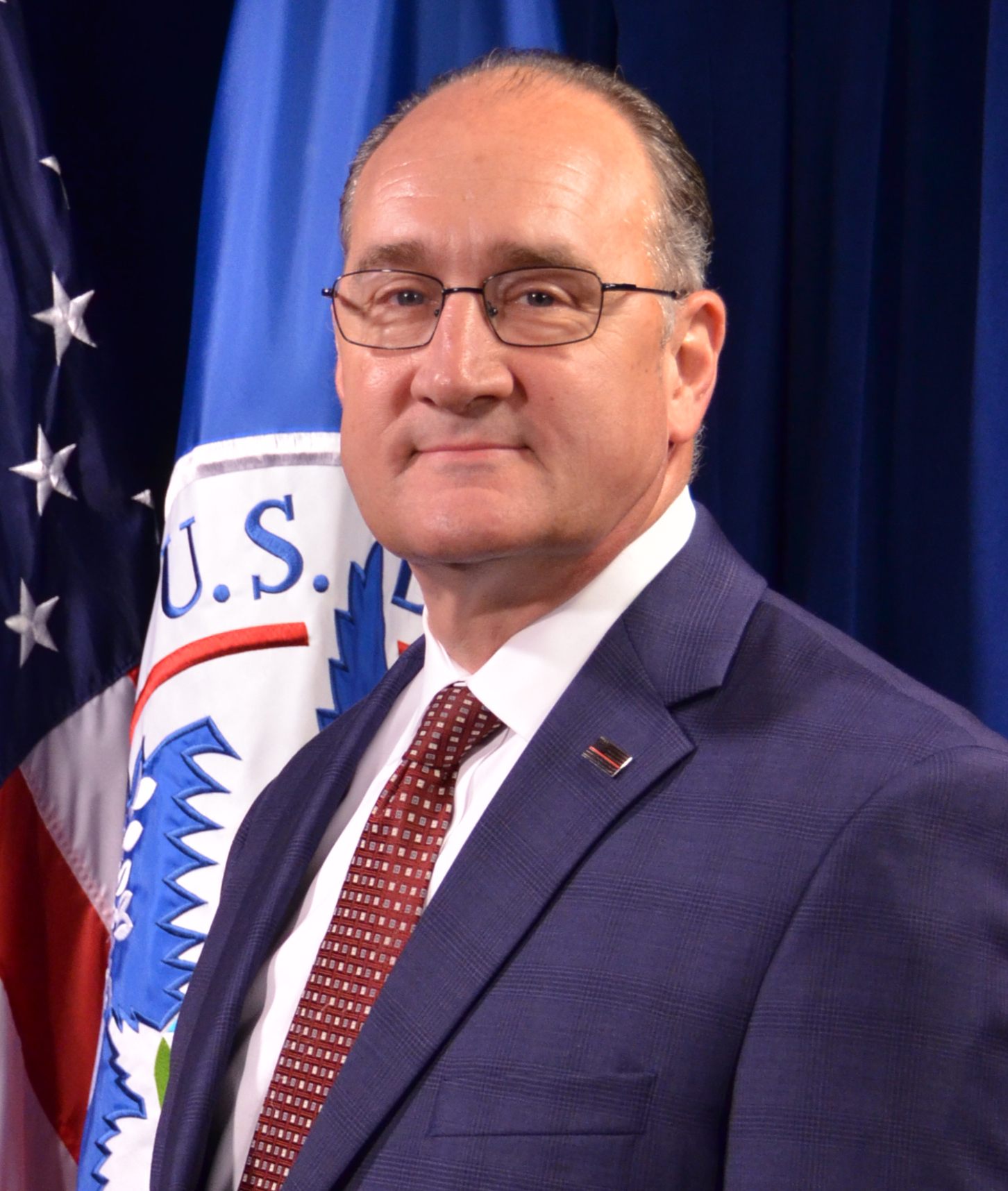

Oklahoma State Fire Marshal
- Incumbent
- Assumed office May 1, 2021

United States Fire Administrator
- In office August 7, 2017 – January 20, 2021
- President: Donald Trump
- Preceded by: Denis Onieal
- Succeeded by: Lori Moore-Merrell

Personal details
- Born: 1959 (age 66–67)
- Occupations: Fire Chief, Fire Service Administrator
- Years active: 1977–present

G. Keith Bryant (born 1959) is an American firefighter who was head of the US Fire Administration from 2017 to 2021.

== Career ==
Bryant was a firefighter starting in 1977 before becoming the fire chief of Oklahoma City from 2005 to 2017. He was also the president of the International Association of Fire Chiefs. In May 2017, President Donald Trump announced his intention to nominate Bryant as Administrator of the United States Fire Administration (USFA).

=== United States Fire Administrator ===
On August 7, 2017, Bryant was sworn in as the United States Fire Administrator, serving under President Donald Trump. He led the U.S. Fire Administration, focusing on fire prevention, training, and support for the nation’s fire services, until January 20, 2021.

=== Oklahoma State Fire Marshal ===
On May 1, 2021, Bryant was appointed as the Oklahoma State Fire Marshal by the State Fire Marshal Commission. In this role, he oversees the Office of the State Fire Marshal, which is responsible for enforcing the State Fire Code, investigating arson, conducting building inspections, and promoting fire safety education across Oklahoma.
