= Land Remote-Sensing Commercialization Act of 1984 =

US statute dealing with use of satellite imagery data

- Long title: An Act to establish a system to promote the use of land remote-sensing satellite data, and for other purposes.
- Acronyms (colloquial): LRSCA
- Enacted by: the 98th United States Congress
- Effective: July 17, 1984

Citations
- Public law: Pub. L. 98–365
- Statutes at Large: 98 Stat. 451

Codification
- Titles amended: 15 U.S.C.: Commerce and Trade
- U.S.C. sections created: 15 U.S.C. ch. 68 § 4201 et seq.

Legislative history
- Introduced in the House as H.R. 5155 by Don Fuqua (D–FL) on March 15, 1984; Committee consideration by House Science and Technology, Senate Commerce, Science, and Transportation; Passed the House on April 9, 1984 (Passed Voice Vote); Passed the Senate on June 8, 1984 (Passed Voice Vote) with amendment; House agreed to Senate amendment on June 28, 1984 (Agreed Unanimous Consent) with further amendment; Senate agreed to House amendment on June 29, 1984 (Agreed Voice Vote); Signed into law by President Ronald Reagan on July 17, 1984

The Land Remote-Sensing Commercialization Act of 1984 is a United States statute establishing a system to further the utilization of satellite imagery data obtained from Earth observation satellites located in a geocentric orbit above the atmosphere of Earth.

The H.R. 5155 legislation was passed by the 98th U.S. Congressional session and enacted into law by the 40th President of the United States Ronald Reagan on July 17, 1984.

== Titles of the Act ==
Title 15 United States Code Chapter 68 was authored as seven titles based on U.S. Congressional findings, policies, and purposes as in accordance with the existing Landsat program and Space law.

Title I: Declaration of Findings, Purposes, and Policies - 15 U.S.C. §§ 4201-4204
Title II: Operation and Data Marketing of Landsat System - 15 U.S.C. §§ 4211-4215
Title III: Provision of Data Continuity after the Landsat System - 15 U.S.C. §§ 4221-4227
Title IV: Licensing of Private Remote-Sensing Space Systems - 15 U.S.C. §§ 4241-4246
Title V: Research and Development - 15 U.S.C. §§ 4261-4263
Title VI: General Provisions - 15 U.S.C. §§ 4271-4278
Title VII: Prohibition of Commercialization of Weather Satellites - 15 U.S.C. §§ 4291-4292

== U.S. Congressional Actions to 1984 Act ==
U.S. Congressional amendment and fiscal authorization to the Land Remote-Sensing Commercialization Act of 1984.

Date of Enactment	Public Law No.	U.S. Statute Citation	U.S. Legislative Bill	U.S. Presidential Administration
July 11, 1985	P.L. 99-62	99 Stat. 118	H.R. 2800	Ronald Reagan
October 30, 1987	P.L. 100-147	101 Stat. 860	H.R. 2782	Ronald Reagan

== Repeal ==
The Land Remote-Sensing Commercialization Act was repealed by the enactment of the Land Remote Sensing Policy Act of 1992. The legislative repeal was passed by the 102nd U.S. Congressional session and enacted into law by the 41st President of the United States George H.W. Bush on October 28, 1992.

== See also ==
- Center for Earth Resources Observation and Science
- Commercial use of space
- Copernicus Programme
- Earth Observing System
- Ocean Surface Topography Mission
- Satellite crop monitoring
