= Saint Joseph College and Mother Seton Shrine =

Historic district in Maryland, US

- St. Joseph College and Mother Seton Shrine
- U.S. National Register of Historic Places
- U.S. Historic district
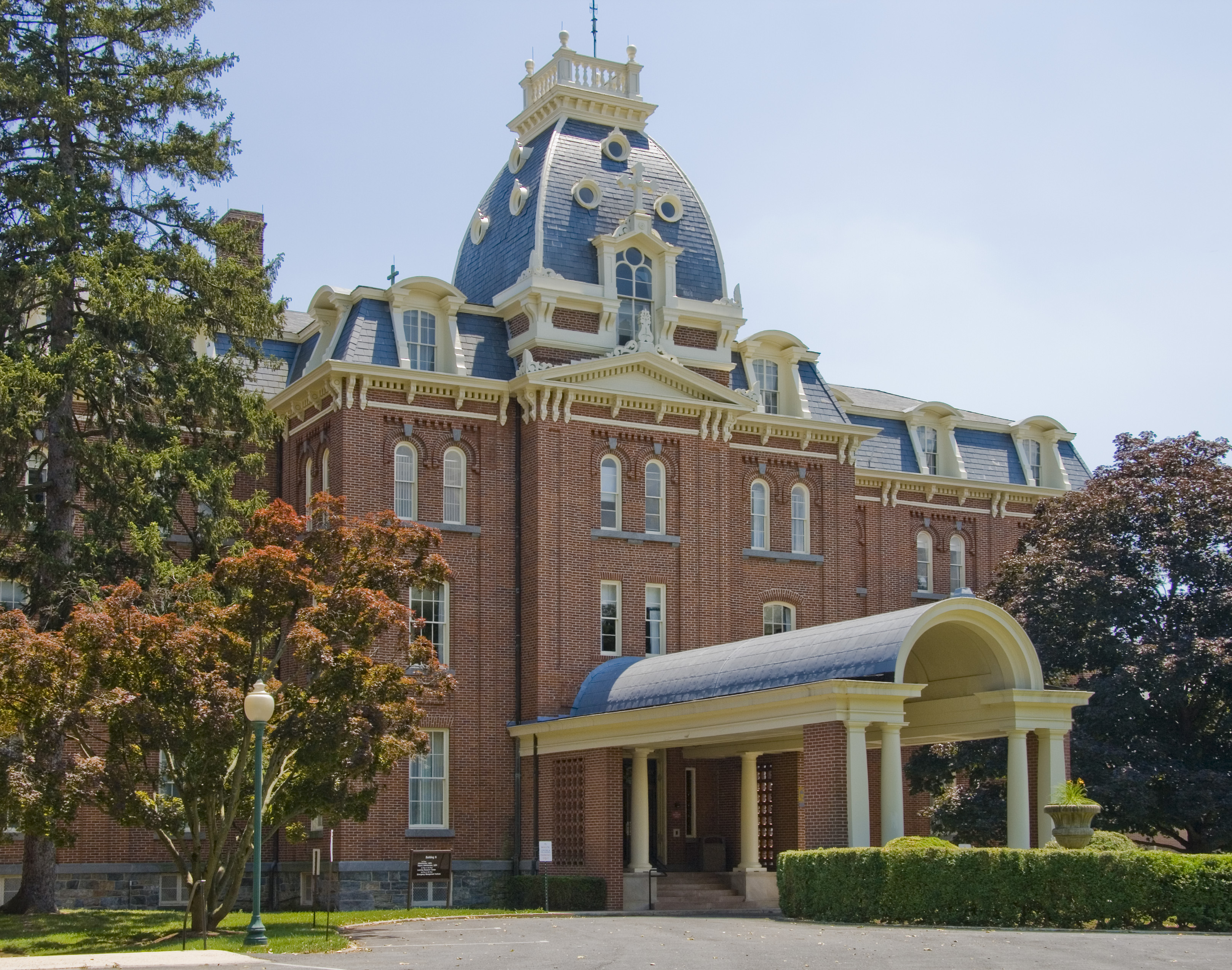
- Burlando Building

- Location within Maryland Location within the United States
- Location: 16825 S. Seton Ave. Emmitsburg, Maryland
- Coordinates: 39°41′40″N 77°19′19″W
- Area: 165 acres (67 ha)
- Built: 1809
- Architect: Lind, E.G.
- Architectural style: Second Empire, Gothic Revival
- NRHP reference No.: 76000994
- Added to NRHP: January 1, 1976

Saint Joseph College and Mother Seton Shrine are two closely related campuses in Emmitsburg, Maryland, United States. It forms a historic district that was listed on the National Register of Historic Places in 1976.

== Saint Joseph College ==
The campus is the original site of Saint Joseph's Academy, a Catholic school for girls from 1809 until 1973. The 107-acre (0.43 km^{2}) Saint Joseph College campus includes a variety of significant buildings including the Second Empire Burlando Building, St. Joseph's Chapel, and an early 19th-century brick barn. The chapel embraces a combination of the Italianate and Romanesque Revival styles.

In June 1809, Elizabeth Ann Seton (later canonized as the first native-born U.S. saint) arrived in Emmitsburg, Maryland and established Saint Joseph's Academy and Free School, the first free parochial school for girls in the United States. This school laid the foundation for the Catholic parochial school system in the United States. Mother Seton wrote classroom textbooks and trained her Catholic sisters to become teachers, and accepted all students regardless of ability to pay. Saint Joseph's Academy and Free School developed into Saint Joseph College High School (1890-1946), Saint Joseph's High School (1946-1982), and Saint Joseph College (1902-1973), a four-year liberal arts college for women. In 1973, Saint Joseph College closed its doors and ceased operations due to declining enrollment numbers and rising operating costs. Students and faculty were merged with Mount Saint Mary's University, formerly a liberal arts men's college located two miles (3 km) south of Emmitsburg on U.S. Highway 15. Even after the school closed, The Daughters of Charity have continued Saint Elizabeth Ann Seton's legacy of helping educate children around the world.

The college campus was purchased by the U.S. Government in 1979 for use as the National Fire Academy. It is home to the National Fire Academy, United States Fire Administration, National Emergency Training Center, and Emergency Management Institute (EMI), which is operated by the Directorate of Preparedness branch of the Federal Emergency Management Agency (FEMA). The campus also includes the learning resource center (LRC) library, the National Fire Data Center, and the National Fallen Firefighters Memorial.

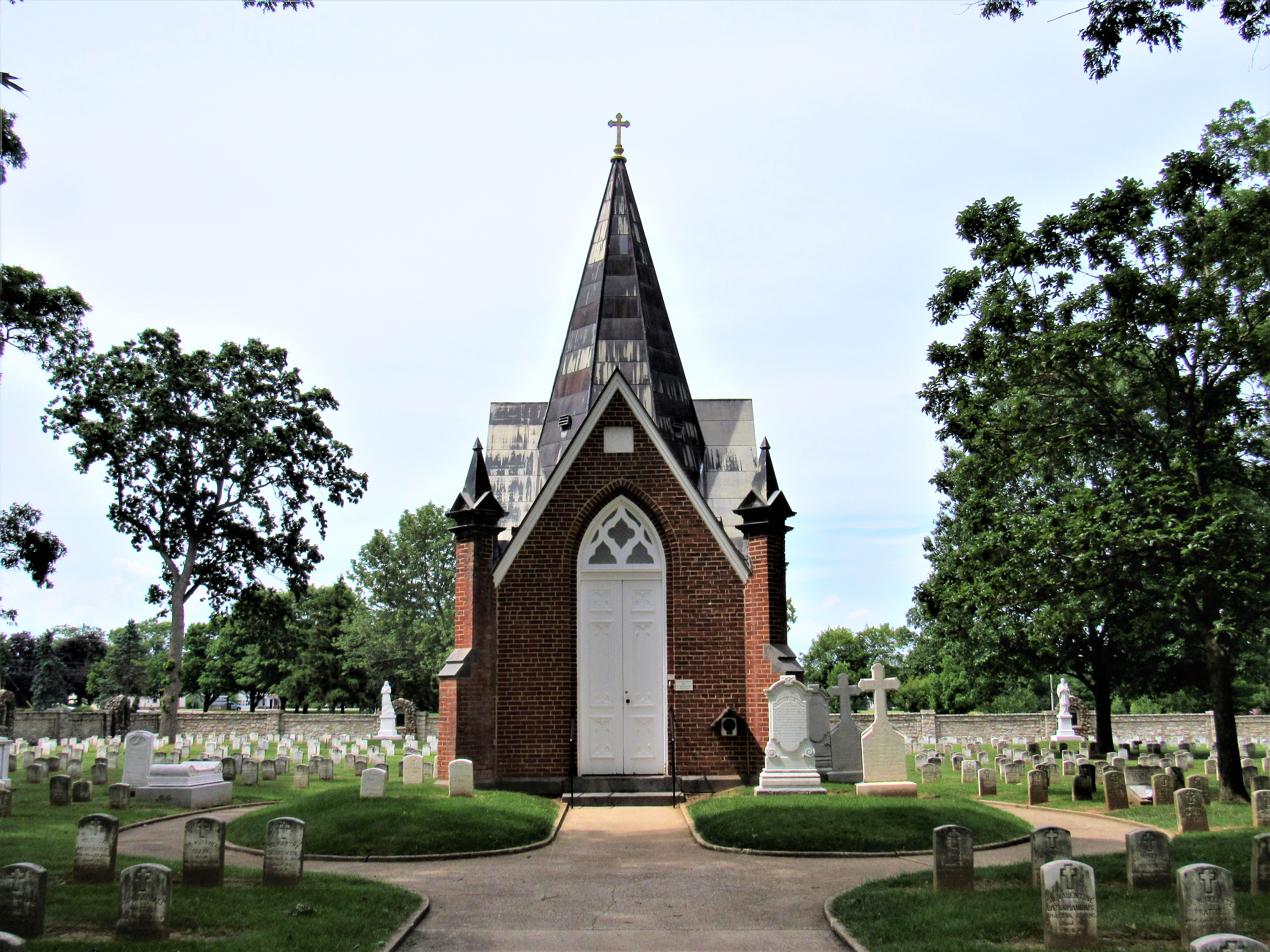
Mother Seton's former tomb

== Mother Seton Shrine ==
The second part of the historic district is part of the National Shrine of St. Elizabeth Ann Seton, which continues to be operated by the Daughters of Charity. The significant buildings here include the Stone House, which predates Mother Seton's arrival here, the White House, and Mother Seton's former tomb. The White House is the first building constructed after the founding of the college and was occupied on February 20, 1810. It has subsequently been expanded. Mother Seton is now buried in the nearby basilica that bears her name, but she was previously buried in a brick Gothic Revival mausoleum in St. Joseph's cemetery. The Seton Shrine also includes the Basilica of the National Shrine of St. Elizabeth Ann Seton and the adjacent St. Joseph's Provincial House, but they are outside of the boundaries of the historic district.
