= America Burning =

1973 American fire prevention report

America Burning: The Report of The National Commission on Fire Prevention and Control is a 1973 report written by the National Commission on Fire Prevention and Control to evaluate fire loss in the United States and to make recommendations to reduce loss and increase safety of citizens and firefighting personnel. The report concluded that fire prevention and fire safety education for the public were critical to reducing the losses associated with fires, and that firefighters also needed to be better disciplined and educated for their jobs in fighting fires. As a result of the report, in 1974 the United States Congress passed the Federal Fire Prevention and Control Act of 1974 leading to the formation of the U.S. Fire Administration, the National Fire Academy, the National Fire Incident Reporting System, and the Center for Fire Research within the National Bureau of Standards. One of the most critical findings of the report was that the high death rate among American firefighters should be addressed. As a result of this report, fire fighting agencies planned life and property loss-reduction strategies for handling incidents before they occurred.

One of the outcomes of the report was the practice of architects and engineers including fire safety in the design of buildings, parks and other facilities.

== National Commission on Fire Prevention and Control ==
The Fire Research and Safety Act of 1968 (Pub. L. 90–259) provided a mandate for a Presidential Commission to be established for research into the hazards of death, injury, and property damage caused by fire. The Act authorized a twenty-member commission to conduct a two-year study aiming to determine effective measures for reducing the destructive effects of fire.

President Richard Nixon appointed the Commission in June 1971. During 1972, the Presidential Task Force conducted regional hearings across the United States surveying communities with regards to flammable incidences. The Presidential Commission concluded their study on May 4, 1973, submitting a report to President Nixon entitled America Burning: The Report of The National Commission on Fire Prevention and Control. On July 12, 1973, President Nixon released a presidential statement commending the National Commission on their analysis and findings related to fire safety and the fire loss dilemma in the United States.

NCFPC Commissioner	Occupation	Affiliation
Richard E. Bland	Commission Chairman; Professor of Engineering	Pennsylvania State University
W. Howard McClennan	Commission Vice Chairman; President	International Association of Fire Fighters
Howard D. Tipton	Executive Director	National Commission on Fire Prevention and Control
Ernst R.G. Eckert, Ph.D.	Professor of Mechanical Engineering	University of Minnesota
Peter S. Hackes	Media Correspondent	National Broadcasting Company
John L. Jablonsky	Vice President	American Insurance Association
Ann Wight Phillips, M.D.	Burn Specialist	Harvard Medical School; Massachusetts General Hospital
Dorothy Duke	Consultant	National Council of Negro Women
Albert Hole	Fire Marshal	State of California
Baron Whitaker	President	Underwriter Laboratories
Percy Bugbee	Honorary Chairman	National Fire Protection Association
Roger Freeman Jr.	President	Allendale Mutual Insurance Co.
Tommy Arevalo	Lieutenant	El Paso, Texas Fire Department
Keith E. Klinger	Chief Emeritus	Los Angeles County Fire Department
Robert A. Hechtman, Ph.D.	President	R.A. Hechtman & Associates
Louis J. Amabili	Director	Delaware State Fire School
William J. Young	Fire Chief	Newington, New Hampshire Fire Department
John F. Hurley	Fire Commissioner	City of Rochester, New York
John A. Proven	Director	Fire Equipment Manufacturers' Association
Frederick B. Dent	Presidential Cabinet Member	Secretary of Commerce
James T. Lynn	Presidential Cabinet Member	Secretary of Housing

== Recommendations of the NCFPC ==
America Burning: The Report of The National Commission on Fire Prevention and Control granted ninety recommendations emphasizing fire prevention and safety education at the local community level while incorporating safety measures to control, detect, and extinguish flammable incidences.

	Chapter 1: The Nation’s Fire Problem
1.	Congress establish a United States Fire Administration to provide a national focus for the Nation’s fire problem and to promote a comprehensive program with adequate funding to reduce life and property loss from fire.
2.	National fire data system be established to provide a continuing review and analysis of the entire fire problem.
	Chapter 2: Living Victims of the Tragedy
3.	Congress enact legislation to make possible the attainment of 25 burn units and centers and 90 burn programs within the next 10 years.
4.	Congress, in providing for new burn treatment facilities, make adequate provision for the training and continuing support of the specialists to staff these facilities. Provision should also be made for special training of those who provide emergency care for burn victims in general hospitals.
5.	National Institutes of Health greatly augment their sponsorship of research on burns and burn treatment.
6.	National Institutes of Health administer and support a systematic program of research concerning smoke inhalation injuries.
	Chapter 3: Are There Other Ways?
7.	Local governments make fire prevention at least equal to suppression in the planning of fire department priorities.
8.	Communities train and utilize women for fire service duties.
9.	Laws which hamper cooperative arrangements among local fire jurisdictions be changed to remove the restrictions.
10.	Local fire jurisdiction prepare a master plan designed to meet the community’s present and future needs in fire protection, to serve as a basis for program budgeting, and to identify and implement the optimum cost-benefit solutions in fire protection.
11.	Federal grants for equipment and training be available only to those fire jurisdictions that operate from a federally approved master plan for fire protection.
12.	Proposed United States Fire Administration act as a coordinator of studies of fire protection methods and assist local jurisdictions in adapting findings to their fire protection planning.
	Chapter 4: Planning for Fire Protection
13.	Proposed United States Fire Administration provide grants to local fire jurisdictions for developing master plans for fire protection. Further, the proposed U.S. Fire Administration should provide technical advice and qualified personnel to local fire jurisdictions to help them develop master plans.
	Chapter 5: Fire Service Personnel
14.	Proposed United States Fire Administration sponsor research in the following areas: productivity measure of fire departments, job analyses, firefighter injuries, fire prevention efforts.
15.	Federal research agencies, such as the National Science Foundation and the National Bureau of Standards, to sponsor research appropriate to their respective missions within the areas of productivity of fire departments, causes of firefighter injuries, effectiveness of fire prevention efforts, and the skills required to perform various fire department functions.
16.	Nation’s fire departments recognize advanced and specialized education and hire or promote persons with experience at levels commensurate with their skills.
17.	Program of Federal financial assistance to local fire services to upgrade their training.
18.	Administering of Federal funds for training or other assistance to local fire departments that eligibility be limited. To those departments that have adopted an effective, affirmative action program related to the employment and promotion of members of minority groups.
19.	Fire departments lacking emergency ambulance, paramedical, and rescue services consider providing them, especially if they are located in communities where these services are not adequately provided by other agencies.
	Chapter 6: A National Fire Academy
20.	Establishment of a National Fire Academy to provide specialized training in areas important to the fire services and to assist State and local jurisdictions in their training programs.
21.	Proposed National Fire Academy assume the role of developing, gathering, and disseminating, to State and local arson investigators, information on arson incidents and on advanced methods of arson investigations.
22.	National Fire Academy be organized as a division of the proposed United States Fire Administration, which would assume responsibility for deciding details of the Academy’s structure and administration.
23.	Full cost of operating the proposed National Fire Academy and subsidizing the attendance of fire service members be borne by the Federal Government.
	Chapter 7: Equipping the Fire Fighter
24.	National Science Foundation, in its Experimental Research and Development Incentives Program, and the National Bureau of Standards, in its Experimental Technology Incentives Program, to give high priority to the needs of the fire services.
25.	Proposed United States Fire Administration review current practices in terminology, symbols, and equipment descriptions, and seek to introduce standardization where it is lacking.
26.	Rapid implementation of a program to improve breathing apparatus systems and expansion of the program’s scope where appropriate.
27.	Proposed U.S. Fire Administration undertake a continuing study of equipment needs of the fire services, monitor research and development in progress, encourage needed research and development, disseminate results, and provide grants to fire departments for equipment procurement to stimulate innovation in equipment design.
28.	Joint Council of National Fire Service Organizations to sponsor a study to identify shortcomings of firefighting equipment and the kinds of research, development, or technology transfer that can overcome the deficiencies.
	Chapter 9: The Hazards Created Through Materials
29.	Research in the basic processes of ignition and combustion be strongly increased to provide a foundation for developing improved test methods.
30.	New Consumer Product Safety Commission give a high priority to the combustion hazards of materials in their end use.
31.	Present fuel load study sponsored by the General Services Administration and conducted by the National Bureau of Standards be expanded to update the technical study of occupancy fire loads.
32.	Flammability standards for fabrics be given high priority by the Consumer Product Safety Commission.
33.	All States adopt the Model State Fireworks Law of the National Fire Protection Association, thus prohibiting all fireworks except those for public displays.
34.	Department of Commerce be funded to provide grants for studies of combustion dynamics and the means of its control.
35.	National Bureau of Standards and the National Institutes of Health cooperatively devise and implement a set of research objectives designed to provide combustion standards for materials to protect human life.
	Chapter 10: Hazards Through Design
36.	National Bureau of Standards to assess current progress in fire research and define the areas in need of additional investigation. Further, the Bureau should recommend a program for translating research results into a systematic body of engineering principles and, ultimately, into guidelines useful to code writers and building designers.
37.	National Bureau of Standards, in cooperation with the National Fire Protection Association and other appropriate organizations, support research to develop guidelines for a systems approach to fire safety in all types of buildings.
38.	All construction involving Federal money, awarding of those funds be contingent upon the approval of a fire safety systems analysis and a fire safety effectiveness statement.
39.	Consumer Product Safety Commission to give high priority to matches, cigarettes, heating appliances, and other consumer products that are significant sources of burn injuries, particularly products for which industry standards fail to give adequate protection.
40.	Schools giving degrees in architecture and engineering that they include in their curricula at least one course in fire safety. Further, we urge the American Institute of Architects, professional engineering societies, and State registration boards to implement this recommendation.
41.	Society of Fire Protection Engineers to draft model courses for architects and engineers in the field of fire protection engineering.
42.	Proposed National Fire Academy develop short courses to educate practicing designers in the basics of fire safety design.
	Chapter 11: Codes and Standards
43.	Local governmental units in the United States have in force an adequate building code and fire prevention code or adopt whichever they lack.
44.	Local governments provide the competent personnel, training programs for inspectors, and coordination among the various departments involved to enforce effectively the local building and fire prevention codes. Representatives from the fire department should participate in reviewing the fire safety aspects of plans for new building construction and alterations to old buildings.
45.	Model code of the International Conference of Building Officials has already done, all model codes specify at least a single-station early-warning detector oriented to protect sleeping areas in every dwelling unit. Further, the model codes should specify automatic fire extinguishing systems and early-yarning detectors for high-rise buildings and for low-rise buildings in which many people congregate.
	Chapter 12: Transportation Fire Hazards
46.	National Transportation Safety Board expand its efforts in issuance of reports on transportation accidents so that the information can be used to improve transportation fire safety.
47.	Department of Transportation work with interested parties to develop a marking system, to be adopted nationwide, for the purpose of identifying transportation hazards.
48.	Proposed National Fire Academy disseminate to every fire jurisdiction appropriate educational materials on the problems of transporting hazardous materials.
49.	Extension of the Chem-Tree system to provide ready access by all fire departments and to include hazard control tactics.
50.	Department of the Treasury establish adequate fire regulations, suitably enforced, for the transportation, storage, and transfer of hazardous materials in international commerce.
51.	Department of Transportation set mandatory standards that will provide fire safety in private automobiles.
52.	Airport authorities review their firefighting capabilities and, where necessary, formulate appropriate capital improvement budgets to meet current recommended aircraft rescue and firefighting practices.
53.	Department of Transportation undertake a detailed review of the Coast Guard’s responsibilities, authority, and standards relating to marine fire safety.
54.	Railroads begin a concerted effort to reduce rail-caused fires along the Nation’s rail system.
55.	Urban Mass Transportation Administration require explicit fire safety plans as a condition for all grants for rapid transit systems.
	Chapter 13: Rural Fire Protection
56.	Rural dwellers and others living at a distance from fire departments install early-warning detectors and alarms to protect sleeping areas.
57.	U.S. Department of Agriculture assistance to (community fire protection facilities) projects be contingent upon an approved master plan for fire protection for local fire jurisdictions.
	Chapter 14: Forest and Grassland Fire Protection
58.	Proposed United States Fire Administration join with the Forest Service, U.S.D.A., in exploring means to make fire safety education for forest and grassland protection more effective.
59.	Council of State Governments undertake to develop model state laws relating to fire protection in forests and grasslands.
60.	Interested citizens and conservation groups to examine fire laws and their enforcement in their respective States and to press for strict compliance.
61.	Forest Service, U.S.D.A., develop the methodology to make possible nationwide forecasting of fuel buildup as a guide to priorities in wildland management.
62.	Development of a National Fire Weather Service in National Oceanic and Atmospheric Administration (NOAA) and urges its acceleration.
	Chapter 15: Fire Safety Education
63.	Department of Health, Education, and Welfare include in accreditation standards fire safety education in the schools throughout the school year. Only schools presenting an effective fire safety education program should be eligible for any Federal financial assistance.
64.	Proposed United States Fire Administration sponsor fire safety education courses for educators to provide a teaching cadre for fire safety education.
65.	To the States the inclusion of fire safety education in programs educating future teachers and the requirement of knowledge of fire safety as a prerequisite for teaching certification.
66.	Proposed U.S. Fire Administration develop a program, with adequate funding, to assist, augment, and evaluate existing public and private fire safety education efforts.
67.	Proposed U.S. Fire Administration, in conjunction with the Advertising Council and the National Fire Protection Association, sponsor an all-media campaign of public service advertising designed to promote public awareness of fire safety.
68.	Proposed U.S. Fire Administration develop packets of educational materials appropriate to each occupational category that has special needs or opportunities in promoting fire safety.
	Chapter 16: Fire Safety for the Home
69.	Supports Operation EDITH (Exit Drills In The Home) plan and its acceptance and implementation both individually and community-wide.
70.	Annual home inspections be undertaken by every fire department in the Nation. Further, Federal financial assistance to fire jurisdictions should be contingent upon their implementation of effective home fire inspection programs.
71.	Americans to protect themselves and their families by installing approved early-warning fire detectors and alarms in their homes.
72.	Insurance industry develop incentives for policy holders to install approved early-warning fire detectors in their residences.
73.	Congress to consider amending the Internal Revenue Code to permit reasonable deductions from income tax for the cost of installing approved detection and alarm systems in homes.
74.	Proposed United States Fire Administration monitor the progress of research and development on early-warning detection systems in both industry and Government and provide additional support for research and development where it is needed.
75.	Proposed U.S. Fire Administration support the development of the necessary technology for improved automatic extinguishing systems that would find ready acceptance by Americans in all kinds of dwelling units.
76.	National Fire Protection Association and the American National Standards Institute jointly review the Standard for Mobile Homes and seek to strengthen it, particularly in such areas as interior finish materials and fire detection.
77.	All political jurisdictions require compliance with NFPA/ANSI standard for mobile homes together with additional requirements for early-warning fire detectors and improved fire resistance of materials.
78.	State and local jurisdictions adopt the NFPA Standard on Mobile Home Parks as a minimum mode of protection for the residents of these parks.
	Chapter 17: Fire Safety for the Young, Old, and Infirm
79.	New provisions of the Life Safety Code for child day care centers and recommends that they be adopted and enforced immediately by all the States as a minimum requirement for licensing of such facilities.
80.	Early-warning detectors and total automatic sprinkler protection or other suitable automatic extinguishing systems be required in all facilities for the care and housing of the elderly.
81.	Federal agencies and the States that they establish mechanisms for annual review and rapid upgrading of their fire safety requirements for facilities for the aged and infirm, to a level no less stringent than the current NFPA Life Safety Code.
82.	Special needs of the physically handicapped and elderly in institutions, special housing, and public buildings be incorporated into all fire safety standards and codes.
83.	States provide for periodic inspection of facilities for the aged and infirm, either by the State’s fire marshal’s office or by local fire departments, and also require approval of plans for new facilities and inspection by a designated authority during and after construction.
84.	National Bureau of Standards develop standards for the flammability of fabric materials commonly used in nursing homes with a view to providing the highest level of fire resistance compatible with the state-of-the-art and reasonable costs.
85.	Political subdivisions regulate the location of nursing homes and housing for the elderly and require that fire alarm systems be tied directly and automatically to the local fire department.
	Chapter 18: Research for Tomorrow’s Fire Problem
86.	Federal Government retain and strengthen its programs of fire research for which no non-governmental alternatives exist.
87.	Federal budget for research connected with fire be increased by $26 million.
88.	Associations of material and product manufacturers encourage their member companies to sponsor research directed toward improving the fire safety of the built environment.
	Chapter 19: Federal Involvement
89.	Proposed U.S. Fire Administration be located in the Department of Housing and Urban Development.
90.	Federal assistance in support of State and local fire service programs be limited to those jurisdictions complying with the National Fire Data System reporting requirements.
