= Title 15 of the United States Code =

U.S. federal statutes on commerce and trade

Title 15 of the United States Code outlines the role of commerce and trade in the United States Code. Notable legislation in the title includes the Federal Trade Commission Act, the Clayton Antitrust Act, the Sherman Antitrust Act, the Securities Exchange Act of 1934, the Consumer Product Safety Act, and the CAN-SPAM Act of 2003.

- 15 U.S.C. ch. 1—Monopolies and Combinations in Restraint of Trade; 15 U.S. Code § 13a is the Robinson Patman Act
- 15 U.S.C. ch. 2—Federal Trade Commission; Promotion Of Export Trade And Prevention Of Unfair Methods uk Competition
- 15 U.S.C. ch. 2A—Securities Act, Trust Indentures Act
- 15 U.S.C. ch. 2B—Securities Exchanges
- 15 U.S.C. ch. 2B-1—Securities Investor Protection
- 15 U.S.C. ch. 2C—Public Utility Holding Companies
- 15 U.S.C. ch. 2D—Investment Company Act, Investment Advisers Act
- 15 U.S.C. ch. 2E—Omnibus Small Business Capital Formation
- 15 U.S.C. ch. 3—Trade-Marks
- 15 U.S.C. ch. 4—China Trade
- 15 U.S.C. ch. 5—Statistical and Commercial Information
- 15 U.S.C. ch. 6—Weights and Measures and Standard Time
  - Subchapter I—Weights, Measures, and Standards Generally
  - Subchapter II—Metric Conversion
  - Subchapter III—Standard Gauge for Iron and Steel
  - Subchapter IV—Screw Threads
  - Subchapter V—Standard of Electricity
  - Subchapter VI—Standard Barrels
  - Subchapter VII—Standard Baskets and Containers
  - Subchapter VIII—Standard Hampers, Round Stave Baskets, and Splint Baskets for Fruits and Vegetables
  - Subchapter IX—Standard Time
- 15 U.S.C. ch. 7—National Institute of Standards and Technology
- 15 U.S.C. ch. 7A—Standard Reference Data Program
- 15 U.S.C. ch. 8—Falsely Stamped Gold or Silver or Goods Manufactured Therefrom
- 15 U.S.C. ch. 9—National Weather Service
- 15 U.S.C. ch. 9A—Weather Modification Activities Or Attempts; Reporting Requirement
- 15 U.S.C. ch. 10—War Finance Corporation
- 15 U.S.C. ch. 10A—Collection of State Cigarette Taxes
- 15 U.S.C. ch. 10B—State Taxation of Income from Interstate Commerce
- 15 U.S.C. ch. 11—Caustic Poisons (repealed)
- 15 U.S.C. ch. 12—Discrimination Against Farmers Cooperative Associations by Boards Of Trade
- 15 U.S.C. ch. 13—Textile Foundation
- 15 U.S.C. ch. 13A—Fishing Industry
- 15 U.S.C. ch. 14—Reconstruction Finance Corporation
- 15 U.S.C. ch. 14A—Aid to Small Business
- 15 U.S.C. ch. 14B—Small Business Investment Program
- 15 U.S.C. ch. 15—Economic Recovery
- 15 U.S.C. ch. 15A—Interstate Transportation Of Petroleum Products
- 15 U.S.C. ch. 15B—Natural Gas
- 15 U.S.C. ch. 15C—Alaska Natural Gas Transportation
- 15 U.S.C. ch. 16—Emergency Relief
- 15 U.S.C. ch. 16A—Emergency Petroleum Allocation
- 15 U.S.C. ch. 16B—Federal Energy Administration
- 15 U.S.C. ch. 16C – Energy Supply and Environmental Coordination
- 15 U.S.C. ch. 17 – Production, Marketing, and Use of Bituminous Coal
- 15 U.S.C. ch. 18 – Transportation of Firearms
- 15 U.S.C. ch. 19 – Miscellaneous
- 15 U.S.C. ch. 20 – Regulation of Insurance, McCarran–Ferguson Act
- 15 U.S.C. ch. 21 – National Policy on Employment and Productivity
- 15 U.S.C. ch. 22 – Trademarks (Lanham Act)
- 15 U.S.C. ch. 23 – Dissemination of Technical, Scientific and Engineering Information
- 15 U.S.C. ch. 24 – Transportation of Gambling Devices
- 15 U.S.C. ch. 25 – Flammable Fabrics
- 15 U.S.C. ch. 26 – Household Refrigerators
- 15 U.S.C. ch. 27 – Automobile Dealer Suits Against Manufacturers
- 15 U.S.C. ch. 28 – Disclosure of Automobile Information
- 15 U.S.C. ch. 29 – Manufacture, Transportation, or Distribution of Switchblade Knives
- 15 U.S.C. ch. 30 – Hazardous Substances
- 15 U.S.C. ch. 31 – Destruction of Property Moving in Commerce
- 15 U.S.C. ch. 32 – Telecasting of Professional Sports Contests
- 15 U.S.C. ch. 33 – Brake Fluid Regulation
- 15 U.S.C. ch. 34 – Antitrust Civil Process
- 15 U.S.C. ch. 35 – Seat Belt Regulation
- 15 U.S.C. ch. 36 – Cigarette Labeling and Advertising
- 15 U.S.C. ch. 37 – State Technical Services
- 15 U.S.C. ch. 38 – Traffic and Motor Vehicle Safety
- 15 U.S.C. ch. 39 – Fair Packaging and Labeling Program
- 15 U.S.C. ch. 39A – Special Packaging of Household Substances for Protection of Children
- 15 U.S.C. ch. 40 – Department of Commerce
- 15 U.S.C. ch. 41 – Consumer Credit Protection
  - Subchapter I — Consumer Credit Cost Disclosure
  - Subchapter II — Restrictions on Garnishment
  - Subchapter IIA — Credit Repair Organizations
  - Subchapter III — Fair Credit Reporting Act
  - Subchapter IV — Equal Credit Opportunity
  - Subchapter V — Debt Collection Practices
  - Subchapter VI — Electronic Funds Transfer
- 15 U.S.C. ch. 42—Interstate Land Sales
- 15 U.S.C. ch. 43—Newspaper Preservation
- 15 U.S.C. ch. 44—Protection of Horses
- 15 U.S.C. ch. 45—Emergency Loan Guarantees to Business Enterprises
- 15 U.S.C. ch. 45A—Chrysler Corporation Loan Guarantee
- 15 U.S.C. ch. 46—Motor Vehicle Information and Cost Savings
  - Subchapter I: Bumper Standards
  - Subchapter II: Automobile Consumer Information Study
  - Subchapter III: Diagnostic Inspection Demonstration Projects
  - Subchapter IV: Odometer Requirements
  - Subchapter V: Improving Automotive Efficiency
  - Subchapter VI: Theft Prevention
- 15 U.S.C. ch. 46A—Automobile Title Fraud
- 15 U.S.C. ch. 47—Consumer Product Safety
- 15 U.S.C. ch. 48—Hobby Protection
- 15 U.S.C. ch. 49—Fire Prevention and Control
- 15 U.S.C. ch. 50—Consumer Product Warranties
- 15 U.S.C. ch. 51—National Productivity and Quality of Working Life
- 15 U.S.C. ch. 52—Electric and Hybrid Vehicle Research, Development, and Demonstration
- 15 U.S.C. ch. 53—Toxic Substances Control
  - Subchapter I—Control of Toxic Substances
  - Subchapter II—Asbestos Hazard Emergency Response
  - Subchapter III—Indoor Radon Abatement
  - Subchapter IV—Lead Exposure Reduction
  - Subchapter V—Healthy High Performance Schools
- 15 U.S.C. ch. 54—Automotive Propulsion Research and Development
- 15 U.S.C. ch. 55—Petroleum Marketing Practices
- 15 U.S.C. ch. 56—National Climate Program
- 15 U.S.C. ch. 56A—Global Change Research
- 15 U.S.C. ch. 57—Interstate Horseracing
- 15 U.S.C. ch. 58—Full Employment and Balanced Growth
- 15 U.S.C. ch. 59—Retail Policies for Natural Gas Utilities
- 15 U.S.C. ch. 60—Natural Gas Policy
- 15 U.S.C. ch. 61—Soft Drink Interbrand Competition
- 15 U.S.C. ch. 62—Condominium and Cooperative Conversion Protection and Abuse Relief
- 15 U.S.C. ch. 63—Technology Innovation
- 15 U.S.C. ch. 64—Methane Transportation Research, Development, and Demonstration
- 15 U.S.C. ch. 65—Liability Risk Retention
- 15 U.S.C. ch. 66—Promotion of Export Trade
- 15 U.S.C. ch. 67—Arctic Research and Policy
- 15 U.S.C. ch. 68—Land Remote-Sensing Commercialization
- 15 U.S.C. ch. 69—Cooperative Research
- 15 U.S.C. ch. 70—Comprehensive Smokeless Tobacco Health Education
- 15 U.S.C. ch. 71—Petroleum Overcharge Distribution and Restitution
- 15 U.S.C. ch. 72—Semiconductor Research
- 15 U.S.C. ch. 73—Export Enhancement
- 15 U.S.C. ch. 74—Competitiveness Policy Council
- 15 U.S.C. ch. 75—National Trade Data Bank
- 15 U.S.C. ch. 76—Imitation Firearms
- 15 U.S.C. ch. 77—Steel and Aluminum Energy Conservation and Technology Competitiveness
- 15 U.S.C. ch. 78—Superconductivity and Competitiveness
- 15 U.S.C. ch. 79—Metal Casting Competitiveness Research Program
- 15 U.S.C. ch. 80—Fasteners
- 15 U.S.C. ch. 81—High-Performance Computing
- 15 U.S.C. ch. 82—Land Remote Sensing Policy
- 15 U.S.C. ch. 83—Telephone Disclosure and Dispute Resolution
- 15 U.S.C. ch. 84—Commercial Space Competitiveness
- 15 U.S.C. ch. 85—Armored Car Industry Reciprocity
- 15 U.S.C. ch. 86—Children's Bicycle Helmet Safety
- 15 U.S.C. ch. 87—Telemarketing and Consumer Fraud and Abuse Prevention
- 15 U.S.C. ch. 88—International Antitrust Enforcement Assistance
- 15 U.S.C. ch. 89—Professional Boxing Safety
- 15 U.S.C. ch. 90—Propane Education and Research
- 15 U.S.C. ch. 91—Children's Online Privacy Protection
- 15 U.S.C. ch. 92—Year 2000 Computer Date Change
- 15 U.S.C. ch. 93—Insurance, Title III of Gramm–Leach–Bliley Activities
- 15 U.S.C. ch. 94—Privacy
- 15 U.S.C. ch. 95—Microenterprise Technical Assistance and Capacity Building Program
- 15 U.S.C. ch. 96—Electronic Signatures in Global and National Commerce
- 15 U.S.C. ch. 97—Women's Business Enterprise Development
- 15 U.S.C. ch. 98—Public Company Accounting Reform and Corporate Responsibility, also known as the "Sarbanes–Oxley Act"
- 15 U.S.C. ch. 99—National Construction Safety Team
- 15 U.S.C. ch. 100—Cyber Security Research and Development
- 15 U.S.C. ch. 101—Nanotechnology Research and Development
- 15 U.S.C. ch. 102—Fairness to Contact Lens Consumers
- 15 U.S.C. ch. 103—Controlling the Assault of Non-Solicited Pornography and Marketing
- 15 U.S.C. ch. 104—Sports Agent Responsibility and Trust
- 15 U.S.C. ch. 105—Protection of Lawful Commerce in Arms
- 15 U.S.C. ch. 106—Pool and Spa Safety
- 15 U.S.C. ch. 107—Protection of Intellectual Property Rights
- 15 U.S.C. ch. 108—State-Based Insurance Reform
- 15 U.S.C. ch. 109—Wall Street Transparency and Accountability
- 15 U.S.C. ch. 110—Online Shopper Protection
- 15 U.S.C. ch. 111—Weather Research and Forecasting Innovation
- 15 U.S.C. ch. 112—Sports Medicine Licensure
- 15 U.S.C. ch. 113—Concrete Masonry Products Research, Education, and Promotion
- 15 U.S.C. ch. 114—National Quantum Initiative
- 15 U.S.C. ch. 115—Perfluoroalkyl and Polyfluoroalkyl Substances and Emerging Contaminants
- 15 U.S.C. ch. 116—Coronavirus Economic Stabilization (CARES ACT)
- 15 U.S.C. ch. 117—Identifying Outputs of Generative Adversarial Networks
- 15 U.S.C. ch. 118—Sustainable Chemistry
- 15 U.S.C. ch. 119—National Artificial Intelligence Initiative
- 15 U.S.C. ch. 120—Minority Business Development
- 15 U.S.C. ch. 121—Flood Level Observation, Operations, and Decision Support
- 15 U.S.C. ch. 122—Travel and Tourism
