= National Fire Academy =

U.S. federal fire training and education institution

The National Fire Academy (NFA) is one of two schools in the United States operated by the Federal Emergency Management Agency (FEMA) at the National Emergency Training Center (NETC) in Emmitsburg, Maryland. Operated and governed by the United States Fire Administration (USFA) as part of the U.S. Department of Homeland Security (DHS), the NFA is the country’s preeminent federal fire training and education institution. The original purpose of the NFA as detailed in a 1973 report to Congress was to "function as the core of the Nation's efforts in fire service education—feeding out model programs, curricula, and information..."

The NFA shares its 107-acre (0.43 km^{2}) Emmitsburg campus with the Emergency Management Institute (EMI) operated by the Directorate of Preparedness branch of FEMA. The campus also includes the Learning Resource Center (LRC) library, the National Fire Data Center, and the National Fallen Firefighters Memorial.

The campus was the original site of Saint Joseph’s College, a Catholic college for women from 1809 until 1973. It was purchased by the U.S. Government in 1979 for use as the NETC.

In 2008, the National Fire Academy trained over 122,000 first responders from all 50 U.S. states.

== History ==
Senator Hugh Scott, a Republican from Pennsylvania, first proposed the creation of a National Fire Academy in March of 1973. Scott was the co-sponsor of the 1968 “Fire and Safety Research Act.” Citing a hotel fire in Tyrone, Pennsylvania that killed 12 persons, Scott advocated for “broader and uniform training on a national scale.” Fire Chief Magazine, March 1973

In 1971, President Richard Nixon assembled a 20-member blue-ribbon panel of experts in the field of fire protection to study the country’s alarming fire problem and the related needs of the American fire services. Chaired by Richard E. Bland, an associate professor at Pennsylvania State University, the group became known as the National Commission on Fire Prevention and Control (NCFPC). The NCFPC and its staff published a report titled America Burning on May 4, 1973. Included in the report was the NCFPC’s recommendation to establish a permanent U.S. Fire Administration “to provide a national focus for the Nation’s fire problem, and to promote a comprehensive program with adequate funding to reduce life and property loss from fire.”

The report further identified several deficiencies in the area of quality fire training across the country including the absence of a systematic method to exchange information among fire educators and fire agencies. In response to those deficiencies, the NCFPC made four specific recommendations:

1. The establishment of a National Fire Academy to provide specialized training in areas important to the fire services and to assist state and local jurisdictions in their training programs.
2. That the proposed National Fire Academy assume the role of developing, gathering, and disseminating to state and local arson investigators, information on arson incidents and on advanced methods in arson investigations.
3. That the National Fire Academy be organized as a division of the proposed United States Fire Administration which would assume responsibility for deciding details of the Academy’s structure and administration.
4. That the full cost of operating the proposed National Fire Academy and subsidizing the attendance of fire service members be borne by the Federal Government.

The intent of the NCFPC was to create a federal training academy that offered programs and curriculum not otherwise available to state fire training agencies and local fire departments, and was to be modeled after the FBI Academy in nearby Quantico, Virginia.

Signed into law on October 29, 1974 by President Gerald R. Ford was Public Law 93-498, also known as the “National Fire Prevention and Control Act” (NFPCA). The NFPCA authorized the creation of the United States Fire Administration (USFA) within the U.S. Department of Commerce. The recommendation to create the National Fire Academy “to function as the National focal point for fire prevention and control training” was adopted with the passing of the act.

In 1979, President Jimmy Carter formed the Federal Emergency Management Agency (FEMA) by consolidating several government organizations. That same year the United States Congress appropriated funds to transfer the Civil Defense Staff College (CDSC), the USFA, and the NFA into FEMA.

The Emergency Management Institute (EMI) and NFA are managed independently with unique student audiences and curricula for the emergency management and national fire communities. EMI and NFA have collaborated on curricula and programs since their inception.

The NFA not only conducts classes on the Emmitsburg campus, but also serves as a hub of a highly structured educational and training network and education system for the entire country “to advance professional development of fire service personnel as a focal point for the professional training of fire officers.”

There are no tuition fees for NFA courses. All instruction and course materials are provided at no cost. Transportation costs and lodging for students who represent career or volunteer fire departments, rescue squads, or state/local governments attending on-campus courses are provided as part of funding under the Student Stipend Reimbursement Program. Students are responsible for the cost of cafeteria meals and for personal, incidental expenses.

In March 2025, the Trump administration canceled in-person classes at the academy. Its centrality to local life in Emmitsburg meant that continued closure would likely have a substantial negative impact on the region's economic livelihood. The academy reopened on June 2, 2025.

== Academics and audiences ==
The curriculum offered at the National Fire Academy includes a wide variety of subjects intended to attract students from all aspects of the American fire services. The original intent of the NCFPC recommendation was to provide course offerings that would appeal to a broad spectrum of firefighters and fire officers across the country. Offerings were designed to be useful for firefighters from small rural volunteer fire departments to firefighters in fully career urban fire departments and included courses in:

Fire Academy Curricula Programs
Fire/Arson and Explosion Investigation
Emergency Medical Services
Emergency Response to Terrorism
Executive Development
Fire Prevention: Management
Fire Prevention: Technical
Fire Prevention: Public Education
Hazardous Materials
Incident Management
Management Science
Planning and Information Management
Responder Health and Safety
Training Programs

== Oversight and assessment ==
An eight-member Board of Visitors (BOV) reviews annually the effectiveness of the entire operation at the National Fire Academy. As specified in the 1974 NFPCA, the BOV is responsible for conducting an examination of: 1. All NFA training programs to determine whether they further the basic missions which are approved by the FEMA Administrator; 2. The physical plant and facilities of the NFA to determine adequacy as a learning environment, and; 3. Funding levels for NFA course delivery programs. After a review and assessment of the three examination areas, the BOV provides advice and makes recommendations to the Assistant Administrator of the USFA.

Members of the BOV are professionals selected from the fields of fire safety, fire prevention, education and training, fire control, research and development in fire protection, treatment and rehabilitation of fire victims, or local government services management.

== Executive Fire Officer Program ==
The Executive Fire Officer Program (EFOP) is the flagship leadership course series at the National Fire Academy. It is the pinnacle of the U.S. Fire Administration's commitment to support the needs of fire and EMS agencies in preparing executive officers to meet the ever-changing demands of the dynamic communities in which they serve. An initiative of the USFA, the EFOP is designed to provide senior fire executives, fire chiefs, chief fire officers, and others in key leadership roles with the ability to:

1. Understand the need to transform fire and emergency services organizations from being reactive to proactive; an emphasis on leadership development, prevention, and risk-reduction; transforming fire and emergency services organizations to reflect the diversity of America's communities; the value of research and its application to the profession; and the value of lifelong learning.

2. Enhance executive-level knowledge, skills, and abilities necessary to lead these transformations, conduct research, and engage in lifelong learning.

The EFOP students enhance their professional development through a unique series of four graduate and upper-division-baccalaureate equivalent courses. The demanding EFOP spans a four-year period with four mandatory core courses. Each course is two weeks in length and must be attended at the NETC Emmitsburg campus.

To graduate from the EFOP, participants must write and submit a graduate-level Applied Research Project (ARP) that relates to their organization after each course. Each ARP is highly scrutinized and graded by an external evaluator. The ARP must be completed within six months from the end of each EFOP class and must receive a minimum passing score before the student can take the next class in the series. Only after all four classes have been completed and all four APRs have received passing grades is the EFOP certificate awarded to the student.

== NETC Library ==
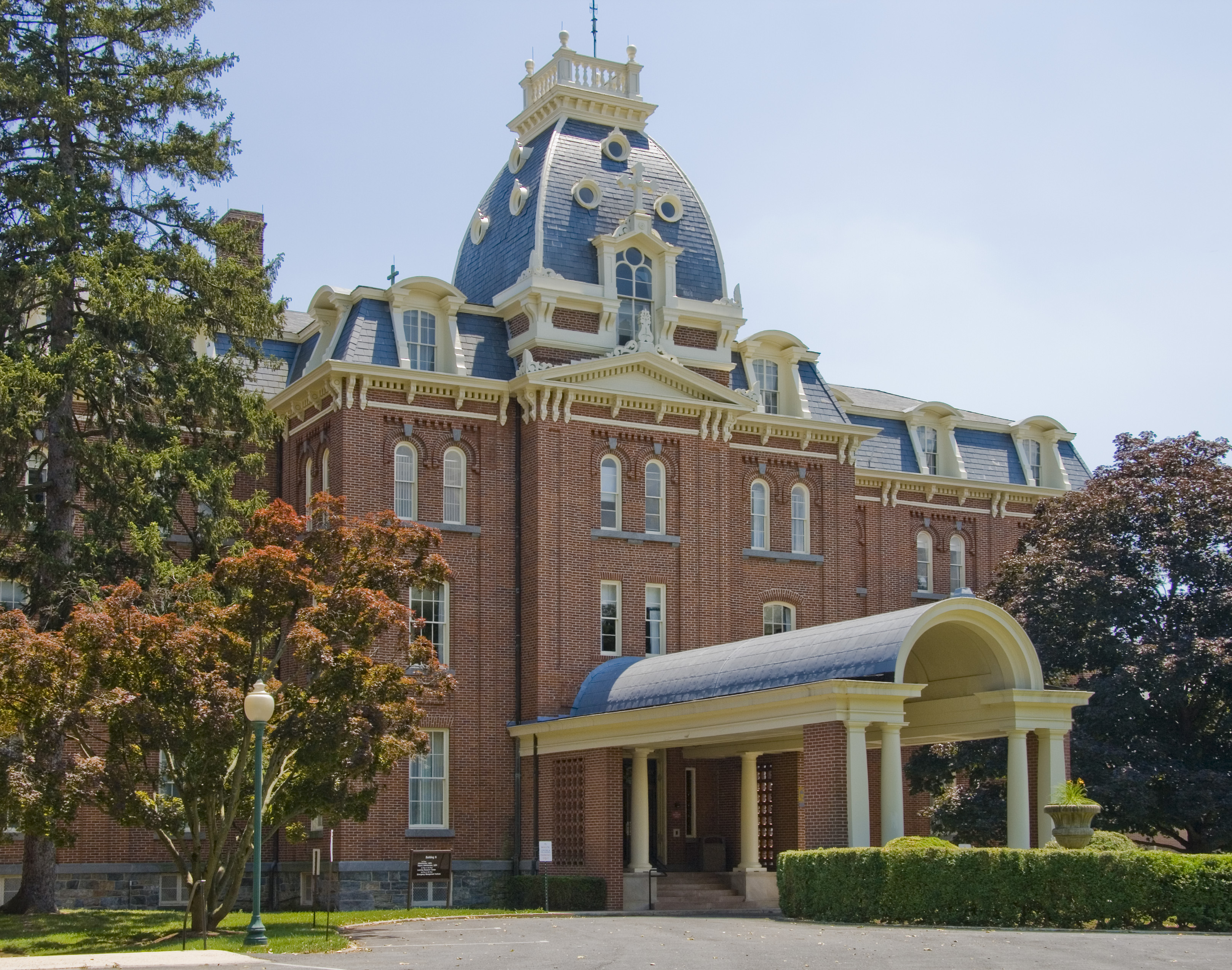
The NETC Library is located in Burlando Hall.

The campus library at the National Fire Academy collects resources on fire, emergency management and other all-hazards subjects. With its collection of more than 208,000 books, reports, periodicals, and audiovisual materials, the NETC Library facilitates and supports student and faculty research and supplements classroom lectures and course materials. Internet users may access the library's online catalog to perform their own literature searches. The NETC Library catalog is a unique guide to periodical literature with citations on fire, EMS, emergency management, natural disasters, and homeland security topics going back to the early 1970s. Librarians on staff index nearly 5,000 newly published articles each year, from scores of professional journals, magazines and newsletters across the country and internationally.

== Current superintendent ==
Eriks Gabliks is the superintendent of the National Fire Academy. He was named to this position in November 2020.

Mr. Gabliks' interest in the fire service began in 1982 when he joined his neighborhood volunteer fire company in Adelphia, New Jersey. Over the years, he would serve with four volunteer, combination and career fire agencies, including Howell Township Fire Company #1 (New Jersey), the Howell Township Fire Bureau (New Jersey), Tualatin Valley Fire and Rescue (Oregon), and the City of Dallas Fire and EMS Department (Oregon). He would serve in positions ranging from entry-level firefighter to deputy fire chief.

In 1991, he joined the Oregon Department of Public Safety Standards and Training (DPSST). DPSST sets professional training and licensing standards for more than 41,000 public and private safety professionals in the state of Oregon. DPSST also operates the Oregon Public Safety Academy, which provides training to more than 25,000 first responders on an annual basis.

During his tenure at DPSST, he served in various roles including training coordinator, fire program manager, assistant director, division director and deputy director. Mr. Gabliks served as the director of DPSST from 2010 to 2020, overseeing a staff of more than 450 employees. He is the first employee in DPSST's history to have ascended to this position from the internal ranks. Oregon's training and certification programs are created in partnership with a 24-member, governor-appointed and Senate-confirmed Board on Public Safety Standards and Training.

Mr. Gabliks holds a bachelor's degree in fire service administration from Western Oregon University and a master's with honors in public policy and administration from the Mark O. Hatfield School of Government at Portland State University. He has also completed the Executive Fire Officer Program at the NFA.

Mr. Gabliks is past president of the North American Fire Training Directors and serves on various state and national organizations, including the Oregon Fire Chiefs Association, International Association of Fire Chiefs and its Safety and Health Section, Drexel University Fire Injury Research and Safety Trends Advisory Committee, and many others.

He is a first generation Latvian and speaks, reads and writes the language. Mr. Gabliks is married to his wife Kelly.

== Past superintendents ==
Superintendent	Term
David M. McCormack	January 1976 - February 1979
Raymond Lamar Perry	April 1979
Dr. B.J. Thompson	January 1980 - July 1981
Joseph L. Donovan	January 1982 - July 1986
William M. Neville	December 1986 - July 1988
Albert G. Kirchner Jr.	June 1991 - January 1993
Dr. Denis Onieal	July 1995 – May 2015
Tonya Hoover	May 2017 – January 2020

== History of the NETC Campus ==
In June 1809, Elizabeth Ann Seton (later canonized as the first American Saint) had arrived in Emmitsburg, Maryland, and established the first parochial school for girls in the United States. Over the years, that school grew to become Saint Joseph College, a four-year liberal arts college for women. However, due to sagging enrollment numbers and rising operating costs, Saint Joseph College closed its doors and ceased operations in 1973. Students and faculty were merged with Mount Saint Mary’s University, formerly a liberal arts men’s college located 2 miles (3.2 km) south of Emmitsburg on highway U.S. 15. Even after the school closed, The Sisters of Charity have continued Saint Elizabeth Ann Seton’s legacy of helping to educate children around the world.

On March 17, 1976, National Fire Prevention and Control Administration (NFPCA) Administrator Howard Tipton established a three-member Site Selection Board to research available properties and to make a recommendation for the permanent site of the newly created National Fire Academy. The Board was composed of Chairman David M. McCormack, first Superintendent of the National Fire Academy; John L. Swindle, Chief of the Birmingham, Alabama, Fire Department; and Henry D. Smith, Chief of Fire Service Training at Texas A&M University.

From a list of 200 proposals received from 39 states, the Board’s first choice was the former Marjorie Webster College in Washington, D.C. The Board placed the Saint Josephs College site in Emmitsburg as second. Also in consideration at that time was the Wards Island site in New York City.

Citing a limited size and lack of growth potential, Congress rejected the Webster College site recommendation. Following intensive lobbying on the part of U.S. Senator Paul Sarbanes and his delegation from Maryland, the Saint Joseph’s College site was selected in March 1979 by the Site Selection Board. Acting USFA Administrator Joseph A. Moreland approved the recommendation. The site selection was also endorsed by Gordon E. Vickery, nominated by President Carter to become Administrator of the USFA. Congress appropriated $6.15 million for the establishment of the National Fire Academy. In 1981, the facilities and campus were entered into the Federal register as the National Emergency Training Center.
