= United States Fire Administration =

Government agency

Agency overview
- Formed: November 1, 1974; 52 years ago
- Jurisdiction: United States
- Headquarters: Emmitsburg, Maryland address, U.S.
- Agency executives: Paul Matheis, U.S. Fire Administrator; Eriks Gabliks, Acting Deputy U.S. Fire Administrator
- Parent department: Department of Homeland Security
- Parent agency: Federal Emergency Management Agency
- Website: www.usfa.fema.gov

The United States Fire Administration (USFA) is a division of the Federal Emergency Management Agency (FEMA) located in Frederick County, Maryland, near Emmitsburg. Per the official website, "the mission of the U.S. Fire Administration is to support and strengthen fire and emergency medical services (EMS) and stakeholders to prepare for, prevent, mitigate and respond to all hazards".

== History ==
On November 1, 1974, President Gerald Ford established the National Fire Prevention and Control Administration (NFPCA), known today as the United States Fire Administration, by signing the Federal Fire Prevention and Control Act of 1974 into law (today Public Law 43-198). The Act was created in response to the 1973 National Commission on Fire Prevention and Control's report America Burning. The report's authors estimated fires caused 12,000 deaths and 300,000 serious injuries annually in the United States, combined with annual property losses of $11.4 billion. Among its 90 recommendations, the report proposed that a federal agency be established to help combat the growing problem of fatal fires happening throughout the country.

On April 11, 1975, President Ford announced his nomination of Ohio State Fire Marshal David A. Lucht to the new position of Deputy Administrator of the NFPCA. On July 24, 1975, President Gerald Ford nominated Howard D. Tipton, who had served as executive director of the NFPCA, to head the new agency as Administrator.

In 1994, Carrye B. Brown was appointed as the first woman and the first African American U.S. Fire Administrator.

The head of USFA between 2017 and 2021 was G. Keith Bryant. From January 20, 2021, Deputy Fire Administrator Tonya Hoover became the Acting Fire Administrator; Lori Moore-Merrell was later sworn in as Fire Administrator on October 26, 2021.

The current Fire Administrator, Paul Matheis, was appointed by President Donald Trump in late March 2026 and sworn in the following month.

== Programs ==
Under its mandate as set forth in the Federal Fire Prevention and Control Act of 1974, USFA manages many of the federal programs related to firefighting including the systematic collection of statistics relating to fire incidents (National Fire Incident Reporting System), public fire education campaign materials, and information on grants and funding. They also provide a directory of approved, fire-safe hotels, and information on home fire safety. The USFA manages the National Emergency Training Center (NETC) in Emmitsburg, Maryland on a campus acquired from Saint Joseph College in March 1979. The NETC comprises the National Fire Academy as well as the Emergency Management Institute. Firefighters and emergency managers from around the United States and the world attend courses at these academies in order to further enhance emergency services in their communities.

== Organization ==
(correct as at December 7, 2021)

- United States Secretary of Homeland Security
  - Deanne Criswell, Administrator – Federal Emergency Management Agency
    - Lori Moore-Merrell U.S. Fire Administrator
      - Tonya Hoover, Deputy U.S. Fire Administrator
        - Eriks Gabliks, Superintendent, National Fire Academy Division
        - Richard Patrick, Director, National Fire Programs Division
        - Al Fluman, Director, NETC Management, Operations and Support Services Division

== See also ==
- National Fire Incident Reporting System
- National Interagency Fire Center
- Incident command system
- Resource Ordering Status System
