= Fire Research Laboratory =

Research laboratory operated by the US Department of Justice

The Fire Research Laboratory (FRL) is part of the Bureau of Alcohol, Tobacco, Firearms and Explosives (ATF), an investigative agency within the United States Department of Justice. Located in Beltsville, Maryland, the FRL is a partnership among law enforcement, fire services, public safety agencies, academia and the private sector that uses the most advanced scientific and technical methods in fire investigation science to serve and protect the public.

The FRL is primarily a crime laboratory supporting public fire investigators. FRL also conducts practical research at the request of fire investigators to improve investigative procedures and knowledge.

== Functionality ==
The Fire Research Laboratory performs the following functions:

- FRL engineers provide engineering support for state, local, and federal fire investigators;
- FRL engineers travel to fire scenes throughout the United States to provide engineering assistance to investigators with on-scene evidence examination, engineering calculations, fire protection system evaluation, and other specialized tasks;
- FRL engineers testify about their analyses in court;
- FRL’s examination laboratories support fire investigations using state-of-the-art instrumentation for ignition source evaluation and flammability properties. The laboratory examination reports are submitted as evidence in court;
- FRL’s fire laboratories are used by investigators to test their theories about how fires were ignited, grew and spread. The laboratory test reports are submitted as evidence in court;
- FRL develops improved investigative and prosecution procedures using scientifically validated methods that integrate the assets of the ATF and its partners to enhance fire investigation personnel expertise;
- FRL maintains a central repository for fire investigative test data that can be searched by ATF fire investigators;
- FRL is an internationally recognized fire investigation research center for the advancement of knowledge, technology transfer and case support related to fire cause investigation and fire scene reconstruction.

=== Advancements in Fire Investigation Science ===
The FRL conducts practical research that is of interest to Fire Investigators. Through its rigorous scientific studies, the laboratory has been instrumental in debunking myths and challenging misconceptions within the field, leading to more accurate fire scene reconstructions and evidence analysis. The development of new technologies and methodologies under the auspices of the FRL has set new standards in the investigation of fire scenes, contributing to the resolution of complex fire-related crimes.

== See also ==
- Arson
- Fire investigation
- Fire protection engineering
- Fire science
