= List of state departments of homeland security =

The following is a list of the Departments of Homeland Security by state in the United States.

List of State Departments of Homeland Security
State	Organization	Established	Budget	Website
Alabama	Alabama Department of Homeland Security	June 18, 2003 (Alabama Homeland Security Act of 2003)		
Alaska	Alaska Division of Homeland Security & Emergency Management	Early 2004		
Arizona	Arizona Department of Homeland Security	February 14, 1912	6,595,778.00	
Arkansas	Arkansas Department of Emergency Management	June 15, 1836	2,889,450.00	
California	California Governor's Office of Emergency Services; Homeland Security Division	September 9, 1850	36,961,664.00	
Colorado	Colorado Department of Public Safety; Division of Homeland Security and Emergency Management	August 1, 1876	5,024,748.00	
Connecticut	Connecticut Department of Emergency Management and Homeland Security	January 9, 1788	3,518,288.00	
Delaware		December 7, 1787	885,122.00	
Florida		March 3, 1845	18,537,969.00	
Georgia		January 2, 1788	9,829,211.00	
Hawaii		August 21, 1959	1,295,178.00	
Idaho		July 3, 1890	1,545,801.00	
Illinois		December 3, 1818	12,910,409.00	
Indiana		December 11, 1816	6,423,113.00	
Iowa	Iowa Department of Homeland Security and Emergency Management	1965	3,007,856.00	
Kansas		January 29, 1861	2,818,747.00	
Kentucky		June 1, 1792	4,314,113.00	
Louisiana		April 30, 1812	4,492,076.00	
Maine		March 15, 1820	1,318,301.00	
Maryland		April 28, 1788	5,699,478.00	
Massachusetts		February 6, 1788	6,593,587.00	
Michigan		January 26, 1837	9,969,727.00	
Minnesota		May 11, 1858	5,266,214.00	
Mississippi		December 10, 1817	2,951,996.00	
Missouri		August 10, 1821	5,987,580.00	
Montana		November 8, 1889	974,989.00	
Nebraska		March 1, 1867	1,796,619.00	
Nevada		October 31, 1864	2,643,085.00	
New Hampshire		June 21, 1788	1,324,575.00	
New Jersey	New Jersey Office of Homeland Security and Preparedness	December 18, 1787	8,707,739.00	https://www.njhomelandsecurity.gov
New Mexico		January 6, 1912	2,009,671.00	
New York	New York State Division of Homeland Security and Emergency Services	July 26, 1788	19,541,453.00	https://www.dhses.ny.gov/
North Carolina		November 21, 1789	9,380,884.00	
North Dakota		November 2, 1889	646,844.00	
Ohio		March 1, 1803	11,542,645.00	
Oklahoma	Oklahoma Office of Homeland Security	May 2004 (Oklahoma Homeland Security Act)	62.2m	http://www.homelandsecurity.ok.gov/
Oregon		February 14, 1859	3,825,657.00	
Pennsylvania		December 12, 1787	12,604,767.00	https://www.HomelandSecurity.PA.gov/
Rhode Island		May 29, 1790	1,053,209.00	
South Carolina		May 23, 1788	4,561,242.00	
South Dakota		November 2, 1889	812,383.00	
Tennessee	Tennessee Department of Safety and Homeland Security	June 1, 1796	6,296,254.00	Tennessee Department of Safety & Homeland Security
Texas	Texas Division of Emergency Management	August 1981	6,644,349,709	https://www.tdem.texas.gov/
Utah		January 4, 1896	2,784,572.00	
Vermont		March 4, 1791	621,760.00	
Virginia		June 25, 1788	7,882,590.00	
Washington		November 11, 1889	6,664,195.00	
West Virginia		June 20, 1863	1,819,777.00	
Wisconsin	Wisconsin Homeland Security Council; Wisconsin Division of Emergency Management	March 18, 2003; 1989		http://homelandsecurity.wi.gov/ http://emergencymanagement.wi.gov/
Wyoming	Wyoming Office of Homeland Security		544,270.00	Wyoming Homeland Security

== See also ==
- Office of Emergency Management
