= Office of emergency management =

Government agency that plans for and responds to disasters

An office of emergency management (OEM; also known as office of emergency services (OES), emergency management office (EMO), or emergency management agency (EMA)) is a local, municipal, tribal, state, federal/national, or international organization responsible for, planning for, responding to, and dealing with recovery efforts related to natural, manmade, technological, or otherwise hazardous disasters by planning and implementing large scale emergency response plans/procedures, coordinating emergency assets during a disaster, and providing logistical, administrative and financial support to a disaster response effort.

== List of agencies and organizations ==
=== United States ===
==== Municipal governments ====
- City of Sacramento's Office of Emergency Management (SacOEM)
- Houston Office of Emergency Management
- Chicago Office of Emergency Management and Communications (OEMC)
- Los Angeles Emergency Management Department (EMD)
- New Orleans Office of Homeland Security & Emergency Preparedness
- New York City Emergency Management (NYCEM) (previously the New York City Office of Emergency Management)
- Philadelphia Office of Emergency Management
- San Diego Office of Homeland Security (OHS)

==== State governments ====
- Alaska Division of Homeland Security & Emergency Management (Alaska DHS)
- Arizona Department of Homeland Security (AZDOHS)
- Arkansas Department of Emergency Management (ADEM)
- California Governor's Office of Emergency Services (OES)
- Connecticut Department of Emergency Management and Homeland Security (DEMHS)
- Florida Division of Emergency Management (FDEM)
- Georgia Emergency Management and Homeland Security Agency (GEMHSA)
- Illinois Emergency Management Agency (IEMA)
- Indiana Department of Homeland Security
- Iowa Department of Homeland Security and Emergency Management (IHSEMD)
- Kansas Division of Emergency Management (KDEM)
- Louisiana Governors Office of Homeland Security and Emergency Preparedness (GOHSEP)
- Maryland Emergency Management Agency (MEMA)
- Massachusetts Emergency Management Agency (MEMA)
- Massachusetts Office of Emergency Medical Services (OEMS)
- Maine Emergency Management Agency (MEMA)
- Minnesota Division of Homeland Security and Emergency Management (HSEM)
- Mississippi Mississippi Emergency Management Agency
- Missouri State Emergency Management Agency
- New Jersey Office of Emergency Management (OEM)
- New York State Emergency Management Office (SEMO)
- North Carolina Department of Public Safety
- Ohio Emergency Management Agency
- Oklahoma Department of Emergency Management (OEM)
- Oregon Office of Emergency Management (OEM)
- Pennsylvania Emergency Management Agency (PEMA)
- Rhode Island Emergency Management Agency (RIEMA)
- Tennessee Emergency Management Agency (TEMA)
- Texas Division of Emergency Management (TDEM)
- Vermont Department of Public Safety
- Virginia Department of Emergency Management (VDEM)
- Washington Military Department Emergency Management Division
- West Virginia West Virginia Division of Emergency Management (WVEM)
- Wisconsin Emergency Management (WEM)

==== Territory and Commonwealth governments ====
- Northern Mariana Islands Emergency Management Office (CNMI EMO)
- Puerto Rico Puerto Rico State Agency for Emergency and Disaster Management (AEMEAD)
- Guam Guam Homeland Security/Office of Civil Defense (GHS/OCD)

==== Federal government ====
- Federal Emergency Management Agency (FEMA)
  - Emergency Management Institute
- EPA Office of Emergency Management
- Office of the Assistant Secretary for Preparedness and Response Office of Emergency Management
- Office of Foreign Disaster Assistance

=== Canada ===
- Public Safety Canada
- City of Toronto government Office of Emergency Management
- British Columbia Emergency Management BC
- Emergency Management Ontario

=== Caribbean ===
- Caribbean Disaster Emergency Management Agency (CDEMA)
- Anguilla Department of Disaster Management (DDM)
- Antigua and Barbuda National Office of Disaster Services (NODS)
- Bahamas Disaster Management Unit
- Barbados Department of Emergency Management
- Belize National Emergency Management Organization (NEMO)
- British Virgin Islands Department of Disaster Management
- Dominica Office of Disaster Management (ODM)
- Grenada National Disaster Management Agency (NaDMA)
- Guyana Civil Defense Commission
- Haiti Civil Protection Directorate
- Jamaica Office of Disaster Preparedness and Emergency Management (ODPEM)
- Montserrat Disaster Management Coordination Agency
- Saint Kitts and Nevis National Emergency Management Agency (NEMA)
- Saint Lucia National Emergency Management Organisation (NEMO)
- Saint Vincent and the Grenadines National Emergency Management Organisation (NEMO)
- Suriname National Coordination Center For Disaster Relief (NCCR)
- Trinidad and Tobago Office of Disaster Preparedness and Management (ODPM)
- Turks and Caicos Islands Department of Disaster Management & Emergencies

=== Africa ===
- Kenya Kenya National Disaster Operation Centre (NDOC)
- Somalia Somali Disaster Management Agency

=== Asia ===
- India National Disaster Management Authority (NDMA)
- South Korea National Emergency Management Agency
- Pakistan National Disaster Management Authority (NDMA)
- Philippines National Disaster Risk Reduction and Management Council (NDRRMC)

=== Europe ===
- Albania General Directorate of Civil Emergencies (DEMA)
- Denmark Danish Emergency Management Agency (DEMA)
- Ireland Office of Emergency Planning (OEP)
- Russia Ministry of Emergency Situations (EMERCOM)
- United Kingdom Civil Contingencies Secretariat (CCS)

=== Oceania ===
- Australia Emergency Management Australia (EMA)
- Australia Emergency Management Victoria (EMV)
- Indonesia Indonesian National Board for Disaster Management (BNPB)
- New Zealand National Emergency Management Agency (NEMA)

=== Defunct organizations ===
- The Office for Emergency Management was a World War II office in the Executive Office of the United States government.
- The U.S. Department of Health and Human Services' Public Health Emergency Preparedness (replaced by the Office of the Assistant Secretary for Preparedness and Response)

== See also ==
- Civil defense by country
- Civil protection
- Department of public safety
- Emergency management
- Emergency management in American universities
- Federal Emergency Management Agency
- Hazard prevention
- List of state departments of homeland security
- United States Environmental Protection Agency
