= Trombino =

Trombino is a surname. Notable people with the surname include:

- Mark Trombino (born 1966), American record producer, musician, and audio engineer
- Paul Trombino III, American engineer and government official
- Peter Trombino (born 1985), American lacrosse player
