= Kerry Pettingill =

American police chief (born 1958)

25th Chief of the Oklahoma Highway Patrol
- In office February 1, 2011 – November 1, 2013
- Governor: Mary Fallin
- Preceded by: Van M. Guillotte
- Succeeded by: Ricky G. Adams

Director of the Oklahoma Office of Homeland Security
- In office January 20, 2004 – February 1, 2011
- Preceded by: Position Created
- Succeeded by: Kim Edd Carter

Personal details
- Born: September 13, 1958 (age 68) Mangum, OK
- Occupation: Police officer
- Website: Oklahoma Department of Public Safety

Kerry Pettingill (born September 13, 1958) is a retired American police officer in the state of Oklahoma. Pettingill joined the Oklahoma Highway Patrol and served as its 25th chief from early 2011 until late 2013 when he retired during the term of Governor of Oklahoma Mary Fallin. Prior to his service as chief, Pettingill served as the director of the Oklahoma Office of Homeland Security under Governor Brad Henry from 2004 to 2011.

== Career ==
Kerry Pettingill earned his Bachelor of Science from Southern Nazarene University and joined the Oklahoma Highway Patrol (OHP) in 1982. During his time OHP, Pettingill served as a bomb technician, hazardous materials technician, and in tactical operations officer. He served as commander of the OHP Bomb Squad, OHP Tactical Operations Team, and as liaison to the Federal Bureau of Investigation's Joint Terrorism Task Force (JTTF). In his position as OHP's SWAT commander, Pettingill was one of the first to respond to the Oklahoma City bombing of the Alfred P. Murrah Federal Building in downtown Oklahoma City on April 19, 1995. For his efforts in the bombing response, Governor Frank Keating appointed Pettingill as Deputy Director of Homeland Security in 2002. Governor Brad Henry promoted Pettingill to Director in 2004. As the State's Homeland Security Director, Kerry oversaw the Oklahoma Office of Homeland Security (OKOHS) in its mission to protect the State from acts of terrorism and overseeing State personnel assigned to the FBI Joint Terrorism Task Force.

On January 6, 2011, Oklahoma Secretary of Safety and Security Michael C. Thompson (who was dual-hatted as Commissioner of the Oklahoma Department of Public Safety) announced that he had selected Pettingill to succeed outgoing Van M. Guillotte as chief of the Highway Patrol. His appointment became effective February 1, 2011. In October 2013, Pettingfill announced his intention to retire from OHP. DPS Assistant Commissioner Ricky Adams was selected by Secretary Thompson to succeed him.

Political offices
Preceded by Robert Ricks	Director of the Oklahoma Office of Homeland Security; Under Governor Brad Henry; January 20, 2004 - February 1, 2011	Succeeded by Kim Edd Carter
Preceded by Van M. Guillotte	Chief of the Oklahoma Highway Patrol; Under Governor Mary Fallin; February 1, 2011 - November 1, 2013	Succeeded by Ricky G. Adams
