= National Weather Service bulletin for Hurricane Katrina =

Dire warning issued in Slidell, Louisiana

About 20 hours prior to Hurricane Katrina's landfall in Louisiana, the National Weather Service bulletin for the New Orleans region issued an unusually strongly worded statement warning of the devastation that Hurricane Katrina's winds could wreak upon the Gulf Coast of the United States, and the human suffering that would follow once the storm left the area.

A National Weather Service assessment of its Hurricane Katrina activity by its parent agency, the National Oceanic and Atmospheric Administration found the bulletin's "unprecedented detail and foreboding nature of the language used ... helped reinforce the actions of emergency management officials as they coordinated one of the largest evacuations in U.S. history." The bulletin "helped reinforce the message from emergency management officials for residents in southeast Louisiana and southern Mississippi to heed evacuation orders from local officials."

== Background ==
Multiple levee failures in New Orleans, heavy flooding and losses exceeding $1 billion during Hurricane Betsy in 1965 raised concerns about flooding from hurricanes. In response, Congress passed the Flood Control Act of 1965 which authorized the Army Corps of Engineers to design and construct the region's hurricane flood protection. The project was called the Lake Pontchartrain and Vicinity Hurricane Protection Project (LPVHPP). The LPVHPP was initially estimated to take 13 years, but when Katrina struck in 2005, parts of the project were 60–90% complete with a revised projected completion date of 2015.

On the evening of Thursday August 25, 2005, Hurricane Katrina made landfall as a Category 1 hurricane near the Miami-Dade–Broward county line in southern Florida and weakened into a tropical storm as a result. The next morning, after passing over the state, Tropical Storm Katrina moved into the Gulf of Mexico, and reintensified back to hurricane strength. As the hurricane passed over the warm waters of the Loop Current, the hurricane began to undergo rapid intensification.

As New Orleans is located on the Mississippi River Delta and parts of the city are below sea level, a strong hurricane could have a devastating effect on the city. Previous warnings, such as the one made by the Houston Chronicle in 2001, told of a disaster that "would strand 250,000 people or more, and probably kill one of 10 left behind as the city drowned under 20 feet of water" following a severe hurricane making landfall on the city. Other publications, such as Popular Mechanics, Scientific American, and The Times-Picayune had given doomsday scenarios in which a sinking city would drown and its residents would be left homeless.

== Rapid weekend intensification ==
At 5:00 p.m. EDT on Friday August 26, the National Hurricane Center's prediction models shifted in unison away from the Florida panhandle, and New Orleans was moved to the center of the cone of uncertainty. By the next morning, on Saturday August 27, the NHC issued a hurricane watch that included the New Orleans metro area, At this point, Katrina was a Category 3 hurricane with 115 mph (185 km/h) winds and about 335 miles (540 km) to the south-southeast of the Mississippi River's mouth. Governor Kathleen Blanco ordered the contraflow lane reversal evacuation to begin at 4:00 p.m on Saturday, August 27. On Saturday night, Max Mayfield, then director of the National Hurricane Center called all the governors in the cone of uncertainty to warn them. Upon urging from Governor Blanco, Mayfield also called Mayor Nagin, telling him that some levees in the Greater New Orleans area could be overtopped. Katrina was upgraded to a hurricane warning by 10:00 p.m. CDT that same evening. Over the course of the overnight hours of August 27, 2005, Hurricane Katrina rapidly strengthened, reaching Category 5 status by the morning of Sunday August 28th. At a news conference at 9 a.m. CDT on Sunday morning August 28, New Orleans mayor Ray Nagin held a televised press conference, and with Governor Blanco standing next to him, ordered the first-ever mandatory evacuation of the city, calling Katrina "a storm that most of us have long feared."

== Bulletin text ==
One hour after Mayor Nagin's press conference to announce mandatory evacuation for the city of New Orleans, the NHC issued its 10:00 a.m. CDT bulletin on Sunday August 28th, predicting maximum sustained winds of 175 mph (280 km/h) and urging that "preparations to protect life and property should be rushed to completion. Max Mayfield indicated that the Mississippi/Louisiana area has "the greatest potential for nightmare scenarios." (By this time, the mass evacuation of south Louisiana including New Orleans was underway and would be completed by 5:00 p.m.) A few minutes later, at 10:11 a.m. CDT (1511 UTC), Robert Ricks, a meteorologist with the New Orleans/Baton Rouge NWS office, issued the following statement as part of the event synopsis text of an inland hurricane wind warning being issued:

000

WWUS74 KLIX 281550 NPWLIX

URGENT — WEATHER MESSAGE NATIONAL WEATHER SERVICE NEW ORLEANS LA 1011 AM CDT SUN AUG 28, 2005

...DEVASTATING DAMAGE EXPECTED...

HURRICANE KATRINA...A MOST POWERFUL HURRICANE WITH UNPRECEDENTED STRENGTH... RIVALING THE INTENSITY OF HURRICANE CAMILLE OF 1969.

MOST OF THE AREA WILL BE UNINHABITABLE FOR WEEKS...PERHAPS LONGER. AT LEAST ONE HALF OF WELL CONSTRUCTED HOMES WILL HAVE ROOF AND WALL FAILURE. ALL GABLED ROOFS WILL FAIL...LEAVING THOSE HOMES SEVERELY DAMAGED OR DESTROYED.

THE MAJORITY OF INDUSTRIAL BUILDINGS WILL BECOME NON FUNCTIONAL. PARTIAL TO COMPLETE WALL AND ROOF FAILURE IS EXPECTED. ALL WOOD FRAMED LOW RISING APARTMENT BUILDINGS WILL BE DESTROYED. CONCRETE BLOCK LOW RISE APARTMENTS WILL SUSTAIN MAJOR DAMAGE...INCLUDING SOME WALL AND ROOF FAILURE.

HIGH RISE OFFICE AND APARTMENT BUILDINGS WILL SWAY DANGEROUSLY...A FEW TO THE POINT OF TOTAL COLLAPSE. ALL WINDOWS WILL BLOW OUT.

AIRBORNE DEBRIS WILL BE WIDESPREAD...AND MAY INCLUDE HEAVY ITEMS SUCH AS HOUSEHOLD APPLIANCES AND EVEN LIGHT VEHICLES. SPORT UTILITY VEHICLES AND LIGHT TRUCKS WILL BE MOVED. THE BLOWN DEBRIS WILL CREATE ADDITIONAL DESTRUCTION. PERSONS...PETS...AND LIVESTOCK EXPOSED TO THE WINDS WILL FACE CERTAIN DEATH IF STRUCK.

POWER OUTAGES WILL LAST FOR WEEKS...AS MOST POWER POLES WILL BE DOWN AND TRANSFORMERS DESTROYED. WATER SHORTAGES WILL MAKE HUMAN SUFFERING INCREDIBLE BY MODERN STANDARDS.

THE VAST MAJORITY OF NATIVE TREES WILL BE SNAPPED OR UPROOTED. ONLY THE HEARTIEST WILL REMAIN STANDING...BUT BE TOTALLY DEFOLIATED. FEW CROPS WILL REMAIN. LIVESTOCK LEFT EXPOSED TO THE WINDS WILL BE KILLED.

AN INLAND HURRICANE WIND WARNING IS ISSUED WHEN SUSTAINED WINDS NEAR HURRICANE FORCE...OR FREQUENT GUSTS AT OR ABOVE HURRICANE FORCE...ARE CERTAIN WITHIN THE NEXT 12 TO 24 HOURS.

ONCE TROPICAL STORM AND HURRICANE FORCE WINDS ONSET...DO NOT VENTURE OUTSIDE!

A similarly worded warning was issued at 4:13 p.m. CDT.

== Impact ==
In the months following the storm, Congress appointed a bipartisan committee to investigate the preparations for and the response to Hurricane Katrina. With regard to the National Weather Service, the committee concluded that "the timeliness and accuracy of the forecasts saved lives."

During an internal assessment by the National Weather Service, the 10:11 bulletin and its impact were analyzed. The report called the bulletin "a significant moment for the NWS during Katrina," as its detailed and explicit language did not have any precedent, though the message was based on a template designed by the Tampa Weather Office in the 1990s. The level of detail was highlighted as an "innovative best practice" in the NWS assessment, which recommended issuing warnings with similar levels of detail in the future. The bulletin was described as "perhaps the most chilling ever issued" by the NWS.

Although it was reported that Mayfield cautioned the levees would be breached, no such warning was issued. “What I indicated in my briefings to emergency managers and to the media was the possibility that some levees in the greater New Orleans area could be overtopped, depending on the details of Katrina’s track and intensity,” Mayfield said.

Ricks, a native of the Lower Ninth Ward, later told NBC Nightly News that he wrote the bulletin based on his previous experiences with Betsy and Camille. He also said that he was looking for statements to take out, but decided to leave the bulletin more or less intact because it seemed valid for a storm that he was convinced would be "the big one". He admitted that he and his colleagues hoped to have been wrong about just how powerful Katrina would become, "but our local expertise said otherwise." He added, "We always prepare for the big one, we just didn't think it was going to come this soon."

The bulletin, and the rosary that Ricks clutched as he and his fellow forecasters weathered the storm in their office, are both now in the National Museum of American History.

== See also ==
- Effects of Hurricane Katrina in New Orleans
- Tropical cyclone watches and warnings
