= Ricky G. Adams =

United States Army general

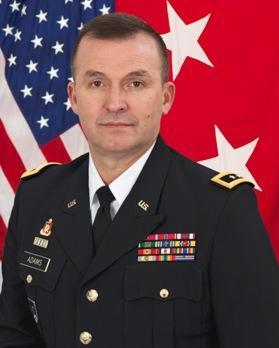
- Major General Ricky G. Adams

Director of the Oklahoma State Bureau of Investigation
- In office July 1, 2018 – November 30, 2022
- Governor: Kevin Stitt
- Preceded by: Bob Ricks
- Succeeded by: Aungela Spurlock

Chief of the Oklahoma Highway Patrol
- In office 2013–2017
- Governor: Mary Fallin
- Preceded by: Kerry Pettingill
- Succeeded by: Michael Harrell

Assistant Commissioner of the Oklahoma Department of Public Safety
- In office 2011–2013
- Governor: Mary Fallin
- Preceded by: Larry Alexander
- Succeeded by: Gerald Davidson

Personal details
- Spouse: Cathy
- Children: 2
- Occupation: Police officer
- Website: Oklahoma State Bureau of Investigation

Military service
- Allegiance: United States; Oklahoma
- Branch/service: Oklahoma Army National Guard
- Years of service: 1978–2014
- Rank: Major General

Ricky G. Adams is a retired United States Army General Officer with service in the Oklahoma Army National Guard and as an American police officer in the State of Oklahoma.

== Education ==
Adams holds a Master of Strategic Studies Degree from the US Army War College and a Bachelor of Science from the University of Central Oklahoma. He is a 2001 graduate of the FBI National Academy and a 2016 graduate of the FBI National Executive Institute. He is also a graduate of the CAPSTONE Program at the National Defense University; National Security Management Course at Syracuse University; JTF Commander Course; Harvard University's Black Sea Security Program and General and Flag Officer Homeland Security Executive Seminar; Joint Flag Officer War Fighter Course, Maxwell Air Force Base, Alabama; George C. Marshall European Center for Security Studies, Senior Executive Seminar, Garmisch, Germany.

== Career ==
Major General (retired) Adams is an Afghan War veteran who retired in 2014 after over 35 years of service in the US Army National Guard. Among his previous executive level military assignments are: Deputy Commanding General National Guard, US Army Training and Doctrine Command, Fort Eustis, Virginia; Assistant Adjutant General – Oklahoma ARNG; Deputy Commanding General - ARNG, Field Artillery Center, Fort Sill; Director-Police Reform Directorate, Kabul, Afghanistan; Deputy Assistant Commandant, United States Army Field Artillery School, Fort Sill; Commander of the 45th Field Artillery Brigade; and Commander of the 1BN 171st FA MLRS - Oklahoma ARNG.

Among his highest military awards are the Army Distinguished Service Medal, Legion of Merit-twice, and the Bronze Star Medal. Adams was also inducted into the Oklahoma National Guard's Officer Candidate School (OCS) Hall of Fame in 2014 and the U.S. Field Artillery Hall of Fame in 2024.

As an American police officer, Adams began his career at the municipal level with the Elk City and Edmond Police Departments from 1980-1986, before joining the ranks of the Oklahoma Highway Patrol (OHP). Adams was an honor graduate of the 42nd OHP Academy in 1986. He then continued a 32-year career, serving at every level within the Highway Patrol from Trooper to Deputy Chief before being selected as the Assistant Commissioner for the Oklahoma Department of Public Safety in 2011. Then in 2013 was selected as the 26th Chief of the Oklahoma Highway Patrol serving with distinction in that position until retiring from the patrol in 2018 and accepting a position as the Deputy Director for the Oklahoma State Bureau of Investigation (OSBI). On July 1, 2018, Adams was chosen as the Director of the OSBI by unanimous vote of the OSBI Commission and served in that position until his retirement in 2022.

During his career he led many major OSBI and OHP investigations, created the OSBI's Cold Case Unit, improved the bureau’s ICAC Unit and was recognized for leading the OSBI to their highest level of operational effectiveness in their nearly 100-year history. With his selection as the OSBI's Director in 2018, he became the only state law enforcement officer to lead both of Oklahoma's largest state police agencies. He was inducted into the Elk City Oklahoma Leadership Hall of Fame in 2015 and the Oklahoma Law Enforcement Hall of Fame in 2023.
