= Oklahoma Highway Patrol =

Law enforcement agency

- Patch of Oklahoma Highway Patrol
- Abbreviation: OHP

Agency overview
- Formed: April 20, 1937; 89 years ago
- Employees: 982 (as of 2011)

Jurisdictional structure
- Operations jurisdiction: Oklahoma, U.S.
- Map of Oklahoma Highway Patrol's jurisdiction
- Area: 69,898 square miles (181,030 km^{2})
- Population: 3,956,971 (2019 est.)
- General nature: Civilian police

Operational structure
- Headquarters: Oklahoma City, Oklahoma
- Troopers: 753 (actual, as of 2021)
- Civilian employees: 204 (as of 2011)
- Agency executive: Chief Pat Mays, Chief of Patrol
- Parent agency: Oklahoma Department of Public Safety

Facilities
- Stations: 13 Field Troops

Website
- Oklahoma Highway Patrol website

The Oklahoma Highway Patrol (OHP) is a major state law enforcement agency of the government of Oklahoma. A division of the Oklahoma Department of Public Safety, the OHP has traffic enforcement jurisdiction throughout the state. OHP was legislatively created on July 1, 1937 due to the growing problem of motor vehicle collisions, the expansion of highway systems, and the increase in criminal activities.

As the principal statewide law enforcement agency in Oklahoma, the Oklahoma Highway Patrol is tasked with providing policing, directed primarily at achieving safer roadways and reducing crime through pro-active investigations, education and patrol services, and by providing leadership and resources during natural disasters, civil disorders and critical incidents. OHP has patrol jurisdiction over all state highways and waterways in Oklahoma, regulating motor vehicles, regulating explosive devices, and providing protection for the governor of Oklahoma, the lieutenant governor of Oklahoma and members of the Oklahoma Legislature.

The Oklahoma Highway Patrol is under the command of Joe Williams, who is the current Chief of Patrol. Chief Williams was appointed by DPS Commissioner Tim Tipton to succeed Mays as chief.

== History ==
=== Operational history ===
In 1937, the Oklahoma Highway Patrol was created under Governor E. W. Marland. That same year the first 125 graduated from the Highway Patrol Academy. The new state troopers met resistance from Oklahoma motorists who were not used to living within the bounds of traffic regulations when none had ever before existed. But the troopers were prepared for this as they paved the way for all future officers by exerting good manners and service to all citizens. A total of 288,277 warnings compared with only 5,518 arrests and citations were written in the first nine months of patrol.

With over 800 troopers statewide, the division has grown into several areas of special services, including Public Information, Capitol Patrol, Marine Enforcement, Training, Bomb Squad, Motorcycle, Tactical Teams, Special Operations, Aircraft, Audits, and Fraudulent Driver License. The department revived "The Flying Squadron," a motorcycle division. A bomb squad was organized that operated state-of-the-art equipment unparalleled in Oklahoma, including two bomb trucks and robots. The east and west tactical teams continue to send their troopers through specialized training programs that elevate them to the best in the state. Special Operations, formerly Criminal Interdiction, now has troopers who each have a well-trained drug canine.

OHP automobiles are among the most traditional in their paint scheme. They are black and white, with a distinctive angular patch of white just behind the passenger compartment; the identification 'Oklahoma Highway Patrol' is contained in an outline of the state in black on the side doors. This has been the uniform scheme since the first unit of 1937. For several decades, the angular patch of white on the rear fenders has been a reflective applique for improved visibility at night.

Today the Oklahoma Highway Patrol serves as the state's only state police agency, with a permanent presence in all of Oklahoma's 77 counties. The Oklahoma Highway Patrol is adapted to the demands of 21st Century law enforcement and is the only state agency with the mission design to proactively prevent crime, to provide specialized resources to local partners, and prevent traffic-related deaths through uniformed police enforcement duties.

Troopers are issued the Glock 47; however, can carry an approved personal weapon which includes the Glock 17 and the SIG Sauer P226.

=== Chiefs of the Patrol ===
The following are the previous chiefs of the Oklahoma Highway Patrol:

Number	Name	Tenure
1st	Jack Hitch	1937
2nd	Ralph H. Cress	1937–1942
3rd	John Reading	1942–1943
4th	J. M. Thaxton	1943–1947
5th	H. B. Lowery, Jr.	1947–1949
6th	Ralph Thompson	1949–1950
7th	Norman Holt	1950–1951
8th	Carl Tyler	1951
9th	W. D. "Bill" Hamilton	1951–1954
10th	Jack Rollins	1954–1959
11th	Lyle M. Baker	1959–1967
12th	W. E. Mayberry	1967–1971
13th	Leo White	1971–1973
14th	Jerry Matheson	1973–1978
15th	Jerry Horton	1978
16th	Darrell Wiemers	1978–1979
17th	Jerry Biggers	1980–1986
18th	Gerald T. "Jerry" Cook	1986–1987
19th	Ernest "Cotton" Allen	1987–1991
20th	Kenneth Vanhoy	1991
21st	Lyle Gene Lockwood	1991–1997
22nd	Gary D. Adams	1998–2006
23rd	Jerry Cason	2006–2007
24th	Van M. Guillotte	2007–2011
25th	Kerry Pettingill	2011–2013
26th	Ricky G. Adams	2013–2017
27th	Michael Harrell	2017–2019
28th	Brent Sugg	2019–2021
29th	Pat Mays	2021–2025
30th	Joe Williams	2025–Present

== Responsibilities ==
The commissioner of public safety, chief of the highway patrol, and each state trooper are peace officers of the state. Troopers have the powers and authority vested in all other state peace officers, including the power of search and seizure (except the serving of civil process), the power to investigate and prevent crime, and the general power to enforce the criminal laws of state. Troopers may arrest any person found by them to be violating any law of the state.

In addition to their general police powers, the legislature has directed that state troopers have the following specific powers and duties:

- Enforcing all laws regulating the operation of motor vehicles or the use of the state's highways
- Enforcing all laws regulating the operation of watercraft or the use of the state's waterways
- Enforcing all laws regulating the transportation of hazardous materials
- Enforcing all criminal laws on the state's turnpikes
- Enforcing all criminal laws they discover through their patrol duties anywhere in the state
- Enforcing all laws regulating vehicle size and weight restrictions
- Assisting in the location of stolen property
- Assisting in or initiating manhunts or fugitive apprehensions
- Investigating and preventing motor vehicle theft
- Investigating and preventing drug transportation
- Investigating and preventing identification fraud
- Investigating and preventing the use of explosive devices
- Providing protection and security to State officials
- Enforcing and investigating any other law when so directed by the Governor of Oklahoma

== Organization ==
The Oklahoma Highway Patrol, a division of the Oklahoma Department of Public Safety (DPS), is under the command and direction of the chief of the patrol. The Chief is appointed by the DPS Commissioner and is responsible for the operations, capabilities, and plans of the patrol. The Chief is assisted in managing the patrol with the help of two deputy chiefs.

The patrol is divided into troops or sections headed by a captain. Each of these Troops has either limited geographic jurisdiction or Statewide functional jurisdiction, with some Troops having law enforcement functions while others have support functions. The thirteen field Troops are the primary field activities of the patrol and are where the bulk of the patrol's troopers are assigned. These Troops are primarily responsible for traffic enforcement and vehicle collision investigation along the state's roadways. The Turnpike Troops have the same mission as the Field Troops but have sole jurisdiction over the state's Turnpike System. The Highway Patrol also has sole jurisdiction over the capitol complex. The Specialized Troops, often called Sections, perform either a specialized law enforcement activity, such as the Marine Enforcement Section, or provide support to the various Field Troops. The various Troops and Sections are organized into eight Zones, seven of these Zones are commanded by an OHP major, and the eighth zone consists of the Communications Division, which is commanded by a non-commissioned communications Officer holding the rank of major. The two deputy chiefs have line authority over these eight majors.

Though an organized highway patrol unit, the Executive Security Section/Troop EX, which provides protection to the governor and lieutenant governor, is not under the operational command of the patrol chief. Instead, the troop answers directly to the DPS Commissioner. The patrol chief is, however, responsible for organizing this troop and ensuring its capabilities.

Upon graduation from the Highway Patrol Academy, all state troopers are assigned to one of the thirteen field troops for their initial assignment. Such initial assignment is made at the discretion of the patrol chief and is not appealable. After their initial assignment is complete, troopers may request reassignment to another field troop to special duty with any of the patrol's specialized units, such as the Marine Enforcement Section or Capital Patrol Section.

=== Structure ===
- Chief of the patrol
  - Two deputy chiefs
      - Troop ES – Executive Security Section
      - Troop Z - Criminal Investigations
      - Professional Standards - Internal Affairs
      - Wrecker Services Division
    - Zone 1
      - Troop A – Oklahoma City
      - Troop J – Enid
      - Troop R - Capitol Patrol Section
      - Troop S – Commercial Vehicle Enforcement Section
    - Zone 2
      - Troop G – Lawton
      - Troop H – Clinton
      - Troop I – Guymon
      - Troop M - Altus
      - Officer Assistance Program
    - Zone 3
      - Troop SO – Oklahoma City
      - Troop T – Training Section
      - Command Post Operations
      - Futures Division - Futures, Plans & Capabilities
    - Zone 4
      - Troop B – Tulsa
      - Troop K – Perry
      - Troop MC – Oklahoma City
      - Troop W - Marine Enforcement
    - Zone 5
      - Troop C – Muskogee
      - Troop D – McAlester
      - Troop L - Vinita
      - Troop Emergency Services - Emergency Response Team, Medical Service unit, Tactical Team, Crisis Negotiations, Federal Task Force, Incident Management Team
    - Zone 6
      - Troop E - Durant
      - Troop F - Ardmore
      - Troop O - Air Support
      - Troop BT - Bomb Squad
      - OHP - Supply
    - Zone 7
      - Troop XA/XD – Will Rogers and Cherokee Turnpikes
      - Troop XB/XC/XE – Muskogee, Indian Nation Turnpike and Creek Turnpikes
      - Troop YA/YB - Cimarron, Turner
      - Troop YE – John Kilpatrick Turnpikes
      - Troop YC – H. E. Bailey Turnpike
      - Oklahoma Highway Safety
    - Zone 8 - Non-Commissioned Dispatchers
      - OHP Communications Division

=== Field troops ===
The highway patrol divides Oklahoma geographically into thirteen "Field Troops", each comprising several counties. These Field Troops of the highway patrol have primary law enforcement authority on state, federal, and interstate highways, including those inside city limits.

District	Headquarters	Coverage
Troop A	Oklahoma City	Oklahoma, Cleveland, McClain, Canadian, Logan, Lincoln, and Pottawatomie counties
Troop B	Tulsa	Tulsa, Creek, Rogers, and Okmulgee counties
Troop C	Muskogee	Muskogee, McIntosh, Sequoyah, Adair, Cherokee, Haskell, and Wagoner counties
Troop D	McAlester	Le Flore, Latimer, Seminole, Pittsburg, Hughes, and Okfuskee counties
Troop E	Durant	McCurtain, Choctaw, Bryan, Marshall, Atoka, Coal, and Pushmataha counties
Troop F	Ardmore	Garvin, Pontotoc, Murray, Love, and Johnston counties
Troop G	Lawton	Caddo, Comanche, Cotton, Grady, Stephens, and Jefferson counties
Troop H	Clinton	Roger Mills, Beckham, Dewey, Custer, and Washita counties
Troop I	Guymon	Cimarron, Texas, Beaver, Harper, Ellis, and Woodward counties
Troop J	Enid	Kingfisher, Blaine, Garfield, Major, Woods, Alfalfa, and Grant counties
Troop K	Perry	Osage, Pawnee, Kay, Noble, and Payne counties
Troop L	Vinita	Nowata, Washington, Delaware, Ottawa, Craig, and Mayes counties
Troop M	Altus	Kiowa, Jackson, Tillman, Greer, and Harmon counties

=== Turnpike troops ===
The Oklahoma Highway Patrol's Turnpike Section has sole law enforcement responsibility for the Turnpike of Oklahoma. The Oklahoma Turnpike Authority (by annual contract with the Oklahoma Department of Public Safety) provides funds to pay, equip, and support state troopers assigned to the Highway Patrol Turnpike Section. These state troopers are then assigned to enforcement duties with the Turnpike Authority but at all times remain a part of and under the command of the highway patrol. While patrolling the turnpikes, state troopers have full authority to enforce all traffic and criminal laws of the state. OHP shares jurisdiction for investigating non-traffic criminal acts with the Oklahoma State Bureau of Investigation.

As of the fiscal year 2011, the Turnpike Authority's annual contract provided over $12.4 million to the highway patrol in exchange for the services of 127 state troopers and six administrative support staffers. The Turnpike Section is headed by a patrol major and is assisted by five patrol captains. The patrol major reports to one of the patrol's three deputy chiefs for command purposes.

District	Headquarters	Coverage
Troop XA	Vinita	Will Rogers Turnpike
Troop XB	Muskogee	Muskogee Turnpike
Troop XC	McAlester	Indian Nation Turnpike
Troop XD	Chouteau	Cherokee Turnpike
Troop XE	Tulsa	Creek Turnpike
Troop YA	Stillwater	Cimarron Turnpike
Troop YB	Stroud	Turner Turnpike
Troop YC	Lawton	H. E. Bailey Turnpike
Troop YE	Oklahoma City	John Kilpatrick Turnpike

=== Specialized troops ===
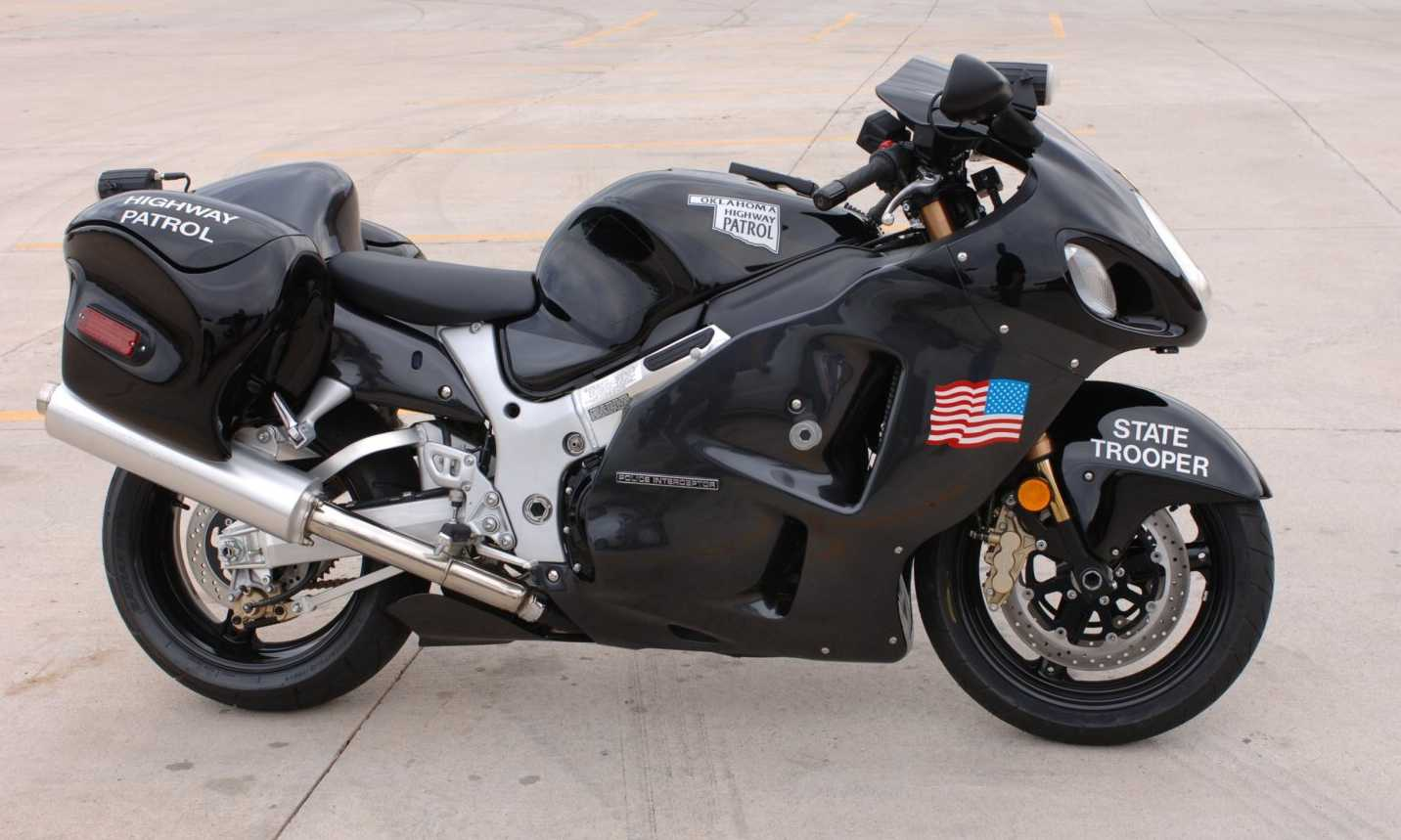
Oklahoma Highway Patrol Suzuki Hayabusa

Specialty troops of the highway patrol perform specialized law enforcement functions within the scope of the mission and operation of the Oklahoma Department of Public Safety, and have jurisdiction statewide.

Section	Headquarters	Coverage
Troop BT	Oklahoma City	Bomb squad and hazardous material disposal
Troop ES	Oklahoma City	Provides security and protection for the Governor of Oklahoma
Troop MC	Oklahoma City	Motorcycle patrol for Oklahoma and Tulsa Counties
Troop O	Norman	Aircraft Operations
Troop P	Oklahoma City	Public Information
Troop R	Oklahoma City	Capitol Patrol Section, provides security and protection for Oklahoma State Capitol
Troop S	Oklahoma City	Commercial Vehicle Enforcement Section, including motor carrier safety, hazardous materials transportation, and size and weight enforcement
Troop SO	Oklahoma City	Special Operations, including investigating vehicle theft and fraud, criminal interdiction, evidence supervision, and asset forfeiture
Troop T	Oklahoma City	Training
Troop W	Oklahoma City	Marine Enforcement
Troop Z	Oklahoma City	Investigations Division
Dive Team	Oklahoma City	Recovery team for victims, vehicles, and/or evidence from drownings, vehicle or boating accidents, natural disasters, and the investigation of any criminal act involving the waters of the state
Tactical Team	Oklahoma City	Responds to manhunts, search and rescue operations, high-risk warrants, hostage/barricaded subjects, and any other duties required by the chief of the patrol

== Specialized Units ==
=== Aviation Section ===
The Aviation Section is a specialized unit within the highway patrol. The Aviation Section, or Troop O, serves as the law enforcement air support arm of Patrol. The section provides aircraft to respond to various emergencies and tasks by supporting other law enforcement organizations as well as all units of the patrol. In particular, the section's aircraft provide airborne assistance to OHP ground units in traffic enforcement, manhunts, and search and rescue operations statewide. This section also provides transportation to state personnel, such as the Governor.

Troop O operates one helicopter and Two fixed-wing aircraft. The section consists of 1 Trooper and 1 Captain. The section is under the direction of a troop commander, who holds the rank of captain with the highway patrol.

=== Bomb Squad Section ===
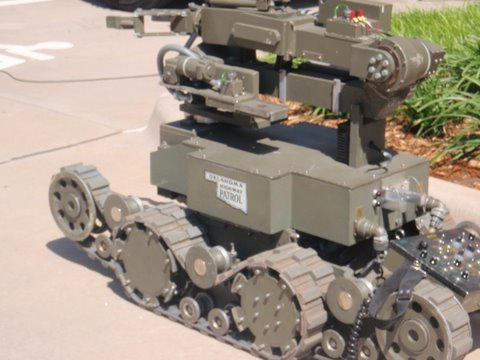
Oklahoma Highway Patrol Bomb Squad Robot

The Bomb Squad Section is a special law enforcement unit within the highway patrol. Bomb Squad Section, or Troop BT, is responsible for bomb disposal Statewide. The Bomb Squad partners with the Office of the Oklahoma Fire Marshal, the Oklahoma Department of Environmental Quality, and the Oklahoma Department of Mines to enforce all State laws regulating explosive materials.

The squad's troopers are placed across the state to allow for rapid response. The highway patrol maintains Bomb Squad units in Oklahoma City, Tulsa, and Durant. The bomb squad maintains a canine unit to search for hidden explosive devices as well as bomb response robots to safely disarm active devices. Troopers investigate the illegal construction, storage, and use of explosive devices. The bomb squad recovers pre and post-blast evidence provides CBRNE detection and emergency decontamination services, and serves as the state partner to the Bureau of Alcohol, Tobacco, Firearms and Explosives.

Troop BT is composed of 12 law enforcement personnel. Unlike the field troops of the highway patrol, the Bomb Squad Section has jurisdiction statewide as opposed to a specific geographic area. The troop is under the direction of a troop commander, who has the rank of captain with the highway patrol.

=== Investigations Division ===
The Criminal Investigations Division (previously known as the Internal Affairs Section) is a special investigative unit within the highway patrol. The Criminal Investigations Division, or Troop Z, serves as the patrol's primary criminal detection and investigation arm. Troopers (styled investigators) assigned to Troop Z are responsible for investigating trooper-involved shootings and incidents, fugitive apprehensions, identity and driver license fraud, polygraph examinations, speed-trap investigations, threat assessments, auto theft, and all felony crimes which are committed on Oklahoma's Turnpike System.

Investigators conduct crime scene investigations, including interviewing, interrogation, and traffic collision reconstruction. The division provides evidence identification, collection, and preservation for the patrol. The division is also responsible for criminal intelligence-gathering activities for the patrol.

The Investigations Division serves as the professional responsibility unit for the patrol. The division conducts and coordinates the investigations of allegations of serious misconduct on the part of state troopers.

Troop Z is composed of 14 law enforcement personnel. Unlike the field troops of the highway patrol, the Investigations Division has jurisdiction statewide as opposed to a specific geographic area. The troop is under the direction of a troop commander, who has the rank of captain with the highway patrol.

=== Special Operations ===
The Special Operations Section is a special law enforcement unit with the highway patrol. The Special Operations Section, or Troop SO, is the duty responsible for crime detection and prevention. In particular, the section performs traffic stops to investigate and prevent motor vehicle theft, fraud, and other stolen property forms. The section is also the chief unit in the highway patrol that is responsible for drug interdiction. The Special Operations Section detects and arrests criminals who use the state's roads and highways to transport drugs and other illegal substances. The highway patrol's drug canine handlers are located within this Section. Additional duties of the section include initiating manhunts and fugitive apprehensions, controlling all evidence seized by the patrol, as well as managing all seized property.

Troop SO is composed of 24 law enforcement personnel, with 21 troopers and three ranked officers. Unlike the field troops of the highway patrol, the Special Operations Section has jurisdiction statewide as opposed to a specific geographic area. The troop is under the direction of a troop commander, who has the rank of captain with the highway patrol. The commander is assisted in managing the troop with the aid of two supervisors, who each have the rank of OHP lieutenant.

=== Marine Enforcement Section ===
The Marine Enforcement Section (formerly known as the Lake Patrol) is a special law enforcement unit within the highway patrol. It is the duty of the Lake Patrol Section, or Troop W, to serve as the boating education, enforcement and marine investigation arm of the Oklahoma Department of Public Safety. The Lake Patrol was originally created on July 1, 1971, by the Oklahoma Legislature as a separate division of the department, with the patrol commander reporting directly to the commissioner of the department. However, in 1998, the legislature passed a law reorganizing the department. In so doing, the Lake Patrol was merged with the highway patrol. In 2011, the legislature renamed the Lake Patrol as the Marine Enforcement Section.

The Marine Enforcement Section, as the marine law enforcement branch of the highway patrol, provides law enforcement service to 38 state lakes and recreation areas consisting of 4,385 miles of shoreline and 490,215 surface acres of water. In addition to regular water patrol duties, Marine Enforcement troopers investigate boating accidents and drowning incidents. Marine Enforcement Section investigates marine theft, and boat registration fraud, administers the state's boating laws, and conducts boater safety and education training to the public.

The 'OHP Dive Team, a unit of the Marine Enforcement Section, serves the state as a recovery of victims, vehicles, and evidence from drownings, vehicle or boating accidents, and the investigation of any criminal act involving the waters of the state. The Dive Team also responds to requests for public relations, such as displays, festivities, and public education. During natural disasters and emergency situations, the Dive Team assists other state and local authorities with marine rescue activities.

All troopers that join the highway patrol are initially assigned to one of the 13 field troops of the patrol. After their initial assignment, the trooper is eligible to be reassigned to the Marine Enforcement Section.

Troop W is composed of 44 law enforcement personnel, with 38 troopers and six ranked officers. Unlike the field troops of the highway patrol, has jurisdiction statewide as opposed to a specific geographic area. The troop is under the direction of a troop commander, who has the rank of captain with the highway patrol. The commander is assisted in managing the troop with the aid of five supervisors, who each have the rank of OHP lieutenant. Each supervisor oversees one of the five districts of the troop. The districts are organized as follows:

- District 1 – northeastern Oklahoma, headquartered in Barnsdall
- District 2 – Lake Texoma and south-central Oklahoma, headquartered in Kingston
- District 3 – central and western Oklahoma, headquartered in Oklahoma City – Troop W headquarters
- District 4 – eastern Oklahoma, headquartered in Muskogee
- District 5 – southeastern Oklahoma, headquartered in McAlester

=== Capitol Patrol Section ===
The Capitol Patrol is a special law enforcement unit within the highway patrol. It is the duty of the Capitol Patrol Section, or Troop R, to provide law enforcement and protection services for the State Capitol Complex and all state office buildings within Oklahoma County and Tulsa County. The Capitol Patrol was originally created on July 1, 1971, by the Oklahoma Legislature as a separate department division, with the patrol commander reporting directly to the department's commissioner. However, in 1998, the legislature passed a law reorganizing the department. In so doing, the Capitol Patrol was merged with the highway patrol.

The Capitol Patrol, as the primary uniformed security force of the state, is responsible for policing, securing, and ensuring a safe environment in which State employees conduct their business. Troop R has the primary responsibility for protecting the members of the Oklahoma Legislature, the Justices of the Oklahoma Supreme Court, state employees, and over 70 state facilities. The personal security of the Governor and Lieutenant Governor is provided by the Troop ES, the Executive Security Section.

All troopers that join the highway patrol are initially assigned to one of the 13 field troops of the patrol. After at least seven years with the patrol, the trooper is eligible to be reassigned to the Capitol Patrol.

Troop R is composed of 63 total law enforcement personnel, with 50 troopers and 13 ranked officers. Unlike any other troop on the highway patrol, Troop R has unlimited law enforcement jurisdiction in Oklahoma County and Tulsa County. In the performance of their primary security duty, the Capitol Patrol troopers have the authority to enforce all parking, traffic, and criminal laws of the state. The troop is under the direction of a troop commander, who has the rank of captain with the highway patrol. The commander is assisted in managing the troop with the aid of twelve supervisors, who each have the rank of OHP lieutenant.

=== Training Section ===
The Training Section is a specialized unit of the Highway Patrol. Training Section, or Troop T, is responsible for overseeing all entry-level and continuing education of all Patrol personnel. The Training Section is divided into four detachments: Technical Skills, Academy Development, Defensive Tactics, and Legal Research. The Training Section is located at the Department of Public Safety's headquarters at the Robert R. Lester Training Center. The training center houses classrooms, a dormitory, cafeteria facilities, a computer lab, and a physical fitness center.

The primary function of the Training Section is to plan, organize, and conduct the Oklahoma Highway Patrol Academy for entry-level Patrol Cadets. Academy sessions, which are held as authorized by the Oklahoma Legislature, are 24 weeks long, with Cadets residing at the Academy during the session. Daily activities include physical training and classroom instruction. The Academy typically graduates between 50 and 60 Cadets each session. The section also coordinates all continued educational; and training requirements for troopers.

The Training Section is under the command of a troop commander, who has the rank of captain with the highway patrol. The troop commander also serves as the academy director for the Highway Patrol Academy.

=== Commercial Vehicle Section ===
The Commercial Vehicle Enforcement Section is a special law enforcement unit within the highway patrol. It is the duty of the Commercial Vehicle Enforcement Section, or Troop S, to enforce all rules and regulation pertaining to the safe operation of commercial vehicles on the roads and highways of the state. The Oklahoma Legislature established the section on May 31, 1949.

The Commercial Vehicle Enforcement Section performs roadside inspections of commercial vehicles through the operation of local weigh stations to ensure compliance with size and weight requirements and to detect and deter criminal activity. The section also has the responsibility to enforce the laws of the state regulating the transportation of hazardous substances.

Troop S is composed of 67 law enforcement personnel, with 63 troopers and four ranked officers. Unlike the field troops of the highway patrol, has jurisdiction statewide as opposed to a specific geographic area. The troop is under the direction of a troop commander, who has the rank of major with the highway patrol. The commander is assisted in managing the troop with the aid of three supervisors, who each have the rank of OHP lieutenant.

=== Tactical Team ===
The Tactical Team serves as the special weapons and tactics unit of the highway patrol. The Tactical Team responds to high-risk events like manhunts, search and rescue operations, high-risk warrants, hostage situations, and any other duties required by the DPS Commissioner or Chief. Tactical Team troopers are dispersed geographically throughout the state, divided between east and west teams, enabling the team to respond to most situations quickly. Tactical Team troopers are specialized in the heavy assault, sniper operations, and emergency medical operations.

In the event of a large-scale problem that other law enforcement agencies do not have the resources to handle, Tactical Team members can be dispatched to aid the local authorities. The Team's Emergency Medical Service Unit is composed of EMT-certified troopers that respond to and assist local emergency medical agencies in the event they are overwhelmed by either natural or manmade disasters.

=== Executive Security Section ===
The Executive Security Section is a specialized highway patrol law enforcement unit. The section, also known as Troop ES, is responsible for providing the personal security and protection, transportation, and communications capabilities for the Governor of Oklahoma, the Governor's immediate family, and the Lieutenant Governor. The troop is composed of 23 law enforcement personnel, including 19 troopers and 4 ranked officers. The section is commanded by a troop commander with the rank of OHP captain. The commander is assisted by three lieutenants. Seventeen members of the section are assigned to the governor, and 6 are assigned to the lieutenant governor. Troop ES also has the responsibility for ensuring security and providing for the protection of the Oklahoma Governor's Mansion.

== State trooper personnel ==
=== Rank structure ===
==== Current ====
As provided for by the Oklahoma Legislature, the rank system for all personnel within the Oklahoma Highway Patrol is as follows:

Title	Insignia	Description
Commissioner		The Commissioner is appointed by the Governor of Oklahoma to serve as the head of the Oklahoma Department of Public Safety
Assistant Commissioner		The Assistant Commissioner is appointed by the commissioner to serve as the chief of Administrative and Support Services for the Oklahoma Department of Public Safety
Chief (Colonel)		Chief of Police holds the Rank of Colonel, appointed by the commissioner to be the professional head of the patrol, highest ranking uniformed officer
Assistant Chief (Lieutenant Colonel)		Assistant Chief had Rank of lieutenant colonel, position not used but still recognized
Deputy Chief (Lieutenant Colonel)		Deputy Chief holds Rank of lieutenant colonel, responsible for overseeing patrol operations for assigned sections or performing administrative functions
Major		Majors are responsible for overseeing zones which consist of two or more troops of the patrol
Captain		Captains are responsible for serving as a troop commander or performing a technical or specialized staff function
Lieutenant		Lieutenants hold first supervisory rank, responsible for supervising troopers in the performance of their duties or performing a technical or specific staff function
Trooper		Rank attained by Cadets upon successful completion of the training academy, responsible for field law enforcement patrol or specialized or technical law enforcement function
Cadet		A Cadet is a new recruit, and is the rank held by all personnel while assigned as a student at the training academy. These personnel do not wear rank insignia.

=== Pay structure ===
Since the increases on January 1, 2015, as provided by Oklahoma state law, members of the Oklahoma Highway Patrol are paid as follows:

Title	Insignia	Salary/Year
Commissioner		$
Assistant commissioner		$
Colonel		$
Lieutenant colonel		$
Major		$
Captain		$
Lieutenant		$
Trooper		Step 7: $95,194.57; Step 6: $89,239.63; Step 5: $83,671.63; Step 4: $79,055.59; Step 3: $74,192.92; Step 2: $70,299.62; Step 1: $66,638.15; Probationary: $62,069.51
Cadet		$57,762.79

=== Requirements ===
In order to serve as a trooper with the highway patrol, a person must be a citizen of the United States at least 21 years old but not older than 46 years old and must either have an associate's degree or have completed a minimum of 62 semester hours from a college or university. Additionally, all troopers must be persons of "good moral character", and as such, may not have been convicted of a felony or a crime involving moral turpitude.

- Up to three years experience as an Oklahoma Council on Law Enforcement Education and Training certified law enforcement officer, or up to three years of honorable active or reserve military service with the United States Armed Forces will count as 10 semester hours per year.

All applicants that want to join the Oklahoma Highway Patrol must meet the following physical requirement (it is a "pass/fail" event):

- Perform 2000 meter row with times depending on gender and weight.

Applicants must also undergo a written test consisting of reading comprehension, problem-solving, mathematics, writing, and spelling. It also includes an assessment of personality characteristics such as interpersonal ability, assertiveness, stress tolerance, and ethics/integrity. This test must be passed with a minimum score of 70%.

Applicants for a lateral academy must have been employed for a minimum of two years in a full time Oklahoma Council on Law Enforcement Education and Training officer position or an out of state agency that has reciprocity with CLEET. If not currently employed by a law enforcement agency, there may be no more than 1 year since last employed by an agency.

Before employment, all candidates must undergo a psychological evaluation and submit to and successfully pass a controlled substance screening. Upon acceptance, the candidate must attend and successfully complete the Highway Patrol Academy conducted by the Oklahoma Department of Public Safety and must either be a certified peace officer at the time of employment or must become certified within one year by the Oklahoma Council on Law Enforcement Education and Training.

=== Promotions ===
==== Trooper grades ====
All highway patrol members are automatically designated as trooper cadets after joining the patrol. Upon graduation from the Highway Patrol Academy, each trooper cadet is automatically promoted to and receives the salary for the position of the probationary trooper. Upon completion of the one-year probationary period, each probationary trooper is automatically promoted to and receives the salary of Step 1 for the position of trooper.

After the initial promote to the rank of trooper, Step 1, all salary promotions within the rank of trooper occur on January 1 of each year. For every year that a trooper completes with the highway patrol, the annual salary of the trooper increases to the next step. This in-grade promotion is dependent on the following conditions during the preceding year:

- The trooper has achieved a satisfactory performance rating
- The trooper has not received any disciplinary action that resulted in a suspension for ten or more days
- The trooper has not received any disciplinary action which resulted in a demotion

==== Supervisory ranks ====
All promotions from trooper into the supervisory ranks are based on tests administered by the commissioner of public safety, in consultation with the administrator of the Oklahoma Office of Personnel Management. These tests determine the physical and mental qualifications and all potential test-takers must complete a course of training in operations and procedures related to the desired rank.

In general, the following minimum requirements are needed to obtain the following ranks:

- Lieutenant – five years with the patrol
- Captain – seven years with the patrol and one year as a lieutenant
- Major – eight years with the patrol and one year as a captain or two years as a lieutenant
- Lieutenant colonel – nine years with the patrol and two years as a major or four years as a captain
- Chief of the patrol – eleven years with the patrol and one year the assistant chief, two years as a lieutenant colonel, four years as a major or six years as a captain

== Communications ==
The Communications Division of the highway patrol is a distinct uniformed service of the patrol. The Communications Division's members are responsible for providing emergency communications and dispatch services to the state troopers and the general public statewide.

- For state troopers, these services include providing drive license information, vehicle information, and other law enforcement-related information to state troopers as well as routine and emergency communications.
- For the general public, the Communications Division provides current road conditions, weather-related information, and emergency assistance by dialing *55 statewide.

=== History ===
The DPS communication services was established in Stillwater, Oklahoma, in 1939 by the department to provide one-way communications for the department. By 1940, the highway patrol installed two-way transmitters in all of its patrol units and field headquarters across the state, staffed by civilian dispatchers. With an increase in communication needs, DPS established the communications division of the OHP in 1954 and transfer all dispatchers to this central division. At this time, the civilian dispatchers began members of their own distinct uniformed service of OHP, though local troop commanders retained authority over then. In 1975, OHP created the position of Communications Director, who functioned as the Division's head, to assume authority over all OHP communication services. The Communications Director reports to an assigned patrol major.

The communications division now employs over 100 members and staffs thirteen communication centers statewide, one located in each field troop headquarters. Each center has its own supervisor independent of the local troop commander. These supervisors report to the communications supervisor, who in turn reports directly to the state-level communications director.

=== Communications rank structure ===
As an independent uniformed service of the patrol, the Communications Division members wear their own distinct uniform and bear their own internal rank structure. As provided for by the Oklahoma Legislature, the ranks within the Communications Division are as follows:

Rank	Title	Insignia	Description
Major	Communications Coordinator		Communications Coordinator is responsible for statewide Communications and serves as one of the eight zone commanders. The Communications Coordinator has the Rank of Major.
Captain	Communications Director		Communications director is responsible for overall operations of the Communications Division within one of two regions of the state. The Communications Director has the Rank of Captain.
Lieutenant	Communications Superintendent		Communications Superintendent is responsible for overall direction of a Communication Center on a twenty-four-hour basis. The Communications Superintendent has the Rank of Lieutenant.
Sergeant	Communications Supervisor		Communications supervisor has first supervisory rank, and is responsible for direct supervision of an assigned shift at a Communications Center. The Communications Supervisor has the Rank of Sergeant.
Officer	Communications Dispatcher		Rank attained upon successful completion of training, responsible for providing general communication services

=== Requirements ===
The Oklahoma Legislature and the Oklahoma Office of Personnel Management (OPM) have enacted minimum requirements for those desiring to serve as a uniformed member of the Communications Division. As provided for by OPM directives, basic requirements are:

- At least 21 years of age
- An Oklahoma resident
- Possess a High School Diploma or GED
- Type a minimum of 25 words a minute
- Have completed at least 15 hours of college credit or possess six month experience in law enforcement communications
- Successful completion of a background investigation, physical examination, psychological and hearing test

If selected for employment, the individual communications officer is placed on a mandatory twelve-month probationary status. During such time, the officer is subject to termination at will and may not appeal any termination to the Oklahoma Merit Protection Commission. Communications officers attend two one-week classroom sessions during probation. The first session consists of an orientation program, and the second week provides necessary training to be certified to handle sensitive information and to operate computer equipment and technical software. Upon successful completion of the probationary period, communication officers are required to attend annual training. During this training, instruction is provided to the communications officers in new laws, changes to existing laws, new policies of the department and the Communications Division. All members of the division, excluding the director and coordinators, must reside within fifty miles of their assigned communications center.

Promotions within the Communications Division are made only from within the division. In general, OPM provides the following minimum promotion requirements:

- Sergeant – three years as communications officer
- Second lieutenant – Two years as sergeant
- First lieutenant – Two years as second lieutenant
- Captain – Two years as first lieutenant

== See also ==
- Highway patrol
- List of law enforcement agencies in Oklahoma
- State patrol
- State police
