= Robert Ricks =

American meteorologist

- Born: c. 1964 (age 61–62)
- Education: Florida State University (BS)
- Years active: 1990–2020
- Known for: National Weather Service bulletin for Hurricane Katrina
- Spouse: Cynthia
- Children: 2
- Scientific career
- Fields: Meteorology
- Workplaces: National Weather Service New Orleans/Baton Rouge

Robert Ricks Jr. (born c. 1964) is a retired American meteorologist who worked as a lead forecaster at the National Weather Service (NWS) in Slidell, Louisiana. He is known for the strongly worded bulletin he wrote prior to the arrival of Hurricane Katrina, which vividly warned of the damage that the storm would cause. A later review by the NWS called attention to the "unprecedented detail and foreboding nature" of the forecast, and credited it with helping assist officials as they evacuated residents in the storm's path.

== Career ==
Ricks began his career in air traffic control, before brief service in the private sector. He then joined the National Weather Service in 1990, first in Jackson, Mississippi, before moving to Dodge City, Kansas in 1993, and the Lower Mississippi River Forecast Center in Slidell, before joining the National Weather Service Forecast Office for the New Orleans/Baton Rouge area in 1994. He served as event coordinator during severe weather events that impact the New Orleans area.

=== Hurricane Katrina bulletin ===
Ricks' bulletin, which was issued on August 28, 2005, at 10:11 a.m. CDT (about 24 hours before Hurricane Katrina made landfall on the Gulf Coast), has been called "the most dire weather forecast ever issued". It began by describing Katrina as "a most powerful hurricane with unprecedented strength" that would leave the region "uninhabitable for weeks... perhaps longer". It listed the expected damage in extensive detail, warning of profound devastation to infrastructure, including widespread building collapses, and said that the storm would launch "household appliances and even light vehicles" into the air as debris, causing "certain death" for anyone struck. The forecast also predicted that following the storm's passage, "water shortages will make human suffering incredible by modern standards".

When asked about his mindset in crafting the message, Ricks said, "I was trying to find things to actually take out. And I said, 'I cannot find it in myself to take these out, because they seem very valid for the situation'. And I came from the experience of going through Betsy and Camille myself in the Lower Ninth Ward." He began writing the statement based on a template created by meteorologists Barry Goldsmith and Walt Zaleski at the NWS Tampa Bay area office in 1999–2000, but updated it for the New Orleans area and beyond as the storm progressed. Compared to previous weather bulletins, the forecast was so uncharacteristically graphic and intense that some in the news media initially thought it was a hoax, and called the NWS to check its veracity.

The forecast came to fruition for several members of his family. His aunt, Teresa Ricks' Waveland, Mississippi home was washed off its foundation by the storm surge. The Poydras, Louisiana home of his stepmother, Cathy Ricks, was destroyed. A Chalmette, Louisiana restaurant owned by another aunt, Sylvia Guerin, was impacted by an explosion resulting from a gas leak during the hurricane. Ricks' uncle's home was submerged under 14 feet (4.3 m) of water when a nearby levee failed.

Though some meteorologists later said that Ricks' forecast overestimated Katrina's wind speeds and neglected the storm surge, he was widely praised for his efforts to convey the severity of the hurricane. The National Weather Service subsequently made it policy for forecasters to describe the likely damage from a storm. In 2006, a copy of the forecast was donated to the National Museum of American History, as was the family rosary that Ricks held as he and his colleagues rode out the hurricane at their office.

On April 25, 2014, television channel France 24 aired a follow-up program about Hurricane Katrina. It interviewed Robert Ricks, then still working at the New Orleans weather station. He gave as his opinion that the city had safeguarded against a storm of the same magnitude as Katrina, but was still vulnerable to a, "category 4- or category 5- type threat.”

=== Later career ===
In 2010, Ricks was among those honored with the Operational Achievement Group Award by the National Weather Association for his contributions to agencies responding to the Deepwater Horizon accident with forecasts of wind/waves supporting burn and oil recovery missions and containment operations. He retired from the NWS in 2020.

== Personal life ==
Ricks is a graduate of Florida State University, earning his degree in tropical meteorology in 1986. As of 2015, he lives on the north shore of Lake Pontchartrain. He and his wife, Cynthia, have two children.
