= Oklahoma Homeland Security Act =

Oklahoma state law

Oklahoma State Legislature
- Full name: Oklahoma Homeland Security Act
- Signed into law: April 26, 2004
- Governor: Brad Henry
- Bill: House Bill 2280
- Website: Bill text

The Oklahoma Homeland Security Act (74 O.S. § 51-51.3) is an Oklahoma state law that created the Oklahoma Office of Homeland Security to respond to acts of terrorism committed in the State.

The Homeland Security Act was signed into law by Governor Brad Henry on April 26, 2004.

== History ==
The Oklahoma Homeland Security Act was one of many bills put through by states and the US government after the 9/11 attacks. The purpose of these bills was to better prepare states for terrorist attacks, natural disasters, and technological incidents. Previously these situations were handled on an ad hoc basis. Under the Oklahoma Homeland Security Act, this responsibility was placed on the Oklahoma Office of Homeland Security for prevention, mediation, and response to attacks.

1. Previously, the roles and duties of the Oklahoma Homeland Security Act would be found within the responsibilities of the local governments. In cases of widespread incidents that covered multiple jurisdictions, a state of emergency would be issued. A states of emergency would allow the governor to use resources in these cases, but with the creation of the Oklahoma Homeland Security Act a lot of these duties are streamlined..
2. Before HB 2280 was passed an emergency bill, Senate Joint Resolution 42, was passed in February 2002 to create the Office of Interim Oklahoma Homeland Security . A small team was put together by June 2002 to begin the foundations of the organization. This position was to last until December 2003, or until a permanent position was created.

== Purposes of the Act ==
The Homeland Security Act establishes the Oklahoma Office of Homeland Security, and creating the position of Homeland Security Director to head the Office. The Governor of Oklahoma is named the State's chief counterterrorism official and makes the Director responsible for administration of the Office. The Act makes the Office responsible for developing and coordinating the implementation and administration of a comprehensive statewide strategy to protect the State from the following:

- acts of terrorism
- public health emergencies
- cyberterrorism
- weapons of mass destruction

In addition to its other duties, the Act designates the Office as the agency responsible for developing interoperable public safety communications planning for the State.

=== Council composition ===
To assist the Governor and the Homeland Security Director, the Director is allowed the created regional homeland security planning councils. Each advisory council is to be composed of the following:

- a fire chief
- a county sheriff
- a chief of police
- a doctor
- an emergency management coordinator
- an emergency medical services provider
- a veterinarian
- a mayor
- a county commissioner
- a public health representative
- a representative of a public school district
- a representative of an institution of higher learning
- a representative of a local disaster relief agency

All members of the regional advisory councils are appointed by the Director for three year terms. All members serve without compensation and can be removed for cause by the Director.

== See also ==
- Oklahoma Department of Public Safety
- Governor of Oklahoma
- Catastrophic Health Emergency Powers Act
