= Paul Trombino III =

American government official

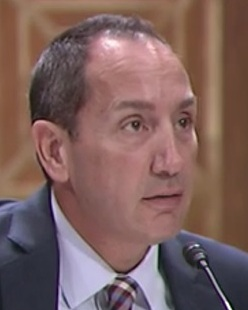
- Paul Trombino in 2017

Director of the Iowa Department of Transportation
- In office 2011–2016

President of the American Association of State Highway and Transportation Officials
- In office 2012–2016

President of McClure Engineering Company
- Incumbent
- Assumed office January 2017

Personal details
- Spouse: Trish
- Children: 2
- Education: BA (1988); BSCE (1995)
- Alma mater: University of Wisconsin-Madison; University of Wisconsin-Milwaukee
- Occupation: Engineer
- Known for: Past president AASHTO

Paul Trombino III is an American engineer and government official. He served as director of the Iowa Department of Transportation from 2011 to 2016. Trombino was nominated by President Donald Trump to become Administrator of the Federal Highway Administration (FHWA), but withdrew in December 2017.

== Career ==
Trombino's first job was with Earth Tech. After earning degrees in economics and civil engineering at the University of Wisconsin, Trombino spent seventeen years at the Wisconsin Department of Transportation, working his way up to Operations Director, Highway Division. In May 2011, he took over the director role at the Iowa Department of Transportation, a role he held until he unexpectedly resigned on November 28, 2016. In January 2017, he became president of McClure Engineering Company, a position he currently holds.

While director of the Iowa DOT in 2012, he announced a policy to deny driver licenses to Iowa residents who were part of the Deferred Action for Childhood Arrivals program. The policy was reversed several weeks later.

Trombino was nominated by President Donald Trump to become Administrator of the Federal Highway Administration (FHWA). His nomination was sent to the United States Senate Committee on Environment and Public Works on September 11, 2017. His confirmation hearing took place on October 5, 2017. The United States Senate Committee on Environment and Public Works was scheduled to vote on his confirmation on October 18, 2017, but that vote was postponed indefinitely. Trombino withdrew from consideration December 11, 2017, citing family concerns.

His nomination for Administrator of the Federal Highway Administration was not formally withdrawn by President Trump but was instead returned unconfirmed to the President by the U.S. Senate on January 3, 2018, under Standing Rules of the United States Senate, Rule XXXI, paragraph 6.

In January 2021, Trombino was made head of the Iowa Department of Homeland Security and Emergency Management. He resigned in May 2021. He was then appointed as public works director in Greeley, Colorado.
