= Alabama Homeland Security Act of 2003 =

Seal of the Alabama Department of Homeland Security

The Alabama Homeland Security Act of 2003 (HSA, HB335) which was signed on June 18, 2003, by Alabama governor Bob Riley, created the Alabama Department of Homeland Security.

== See also ==
- Homeland Security Act of 2002
