= Emergency management in American universities =

In emergency management, higher learning institutions must frequently adapt broad, varied policies to deal with the unique scope of disasters that can occur in on-campus settings. Hurricanes, earthquakes, tornadoes, and wildfires are among some of the most common natural disasters that possess the capacity for large losses of life and property, with the potential to effectively destroy a university community. Man-made crises also can pose a serious threat to life and property, as was evident in the case of the 2007 Virginia Tech shooting. In order to preemptively reduce or prevent the severity of emergency situations, universities must coordinate and implement policies to effectively eliminate unnecessary risks' and decrease potential losses.

Each emergency situation is unique and requires four steps, after an emergency has taken place at a university. Universities, such as East Carolina University, has four different steps when approaching emergency situations. These steps are known as preparedness/mitigation, response, and recovery. Preparedness and mitigation requires each university to be ready at all times for an emergency situation so that everyone remains calm and order can be reestablished as soon as possible. Communication during the response section would be the most important factor. During the response situation, it is important to have an immediate response, in that all help to the emergency situation gets on site as soon a possible to help. The switch from response to recovery is the most important decision of the four steps. This step means the search to help find survivors or even non-survivors is completely over, in which the cleanup and rebuilding process will now begin. Each Step has its own importance and the emergency response process would not work if each step did not cooperate and do its part. This article will examine the threats perceived by American universities and consider the steps these institutions may take to protect their communities from harm.

== Natural disasters ==
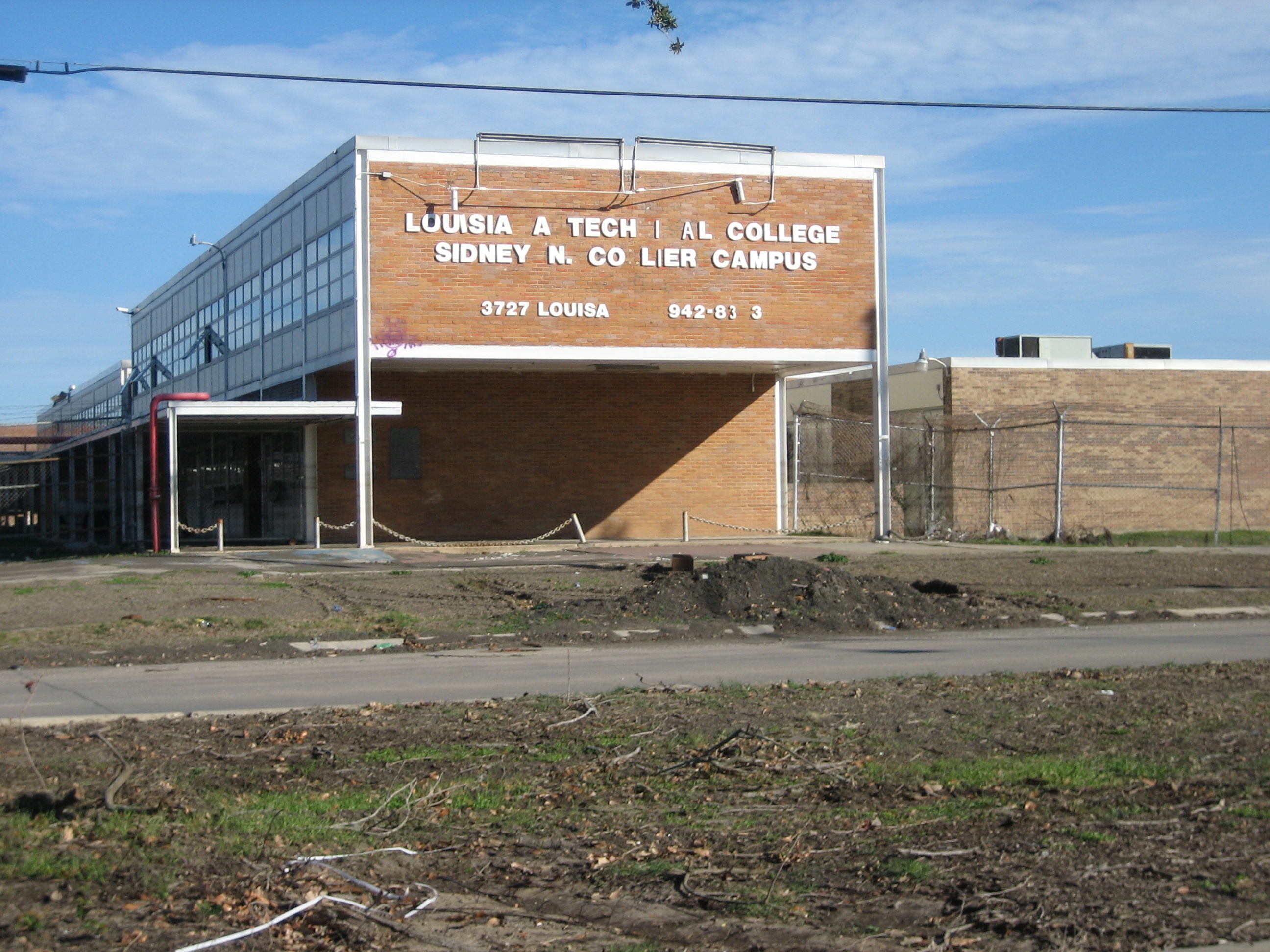
Damaged Louisiana Technical College building, formerly flooded section of Upper 9th Ward

In addition to the devastating economic toll, natural disasters such as hurricanes, earthquakes, coastal flooding, inland flooding, and tornadoes, damage colleges and universities around the United States and also disrupt campus academics and student life. Natural Disasters occur all over the world and are a result of the Earth's natural hazards. Several of these disasters have happened on or very close to American colleges and universities and have caused panic and severe destruction. Depending on the severity of the disaster, some universities recover quickly while others are forced to shut down operations for an extended period of time. Although natural disasters can have varying effects on university campuses and the surrounding area, the important part is how universities prepare and respond to disasters. The success or failure of how disaster management is addressed by campus officials can have a major impact on future preparedness and response efforts for that university and set examples or standards for other schools.

=== Hurricanes ===
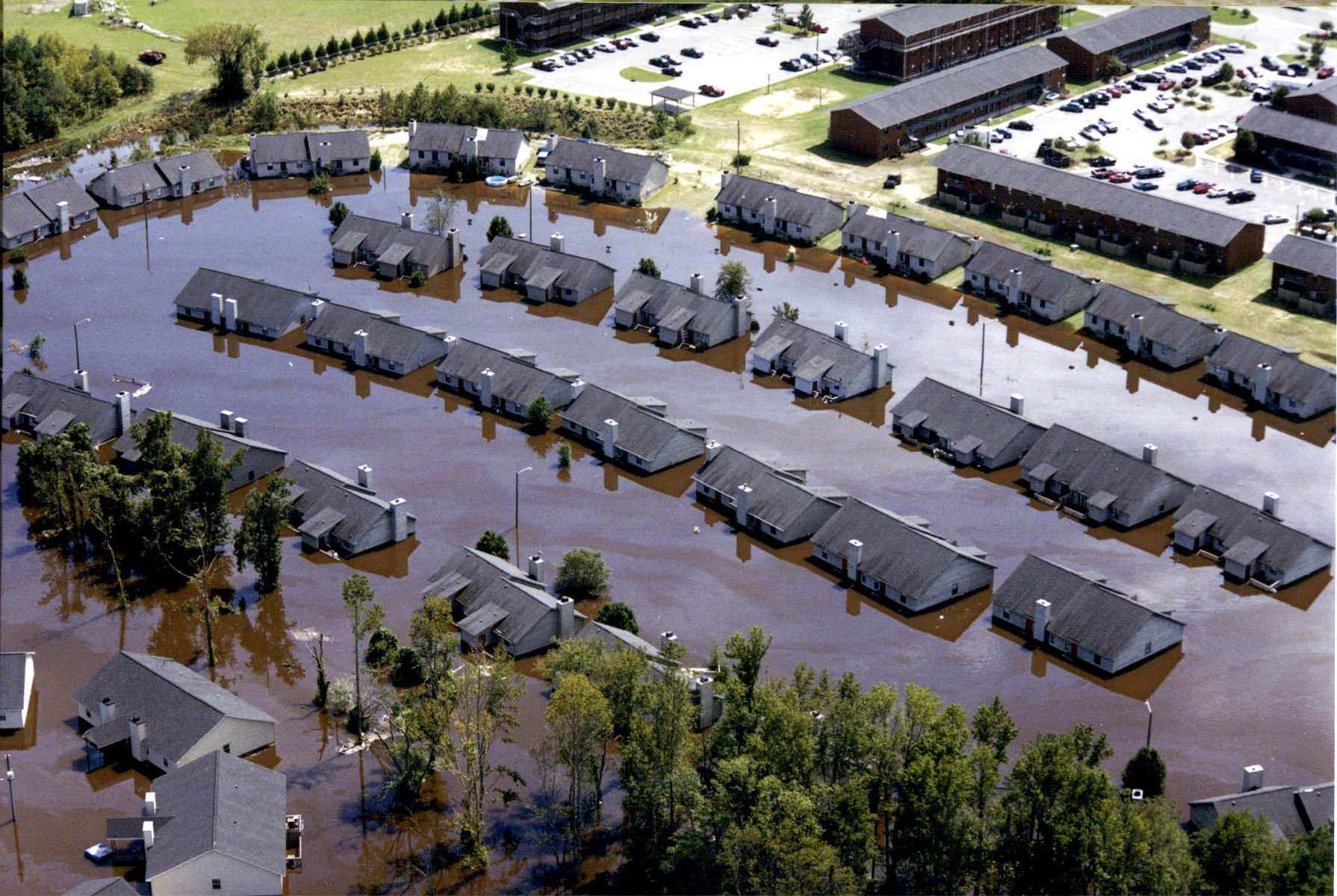
Greenville, NC, 09/16/1999 -- The Tar River flows into a neighborhood. Photo by Dave Saville/ FEMA News Photo

Hurricanes, which are the severest form of a tropical cyclone, have caused a considerable amount of damage to universities located in coastal regions. They are capable of producing high winds and heavy rainfall but they can also have the power to create deadly storm surge and tornadoes. Due to the fact that they form over warm tropical waters, coastal areas are extremely prone to the immediate effects of hurricanes. For universities in these areas the threat of a hurricane is a very real possibility and many have reduced the loss of life and property by implementing preparedness plans, like the University of New Hampshire's Hurricane Preparedness Plan. States like Florida are very prone to hurricanes and the universities here have become very capable preparing for common disasters like these. The University of Miami has campus crisis teams and a university disaster preparation and recovery plan that help them plan and prepare for how they will deal with an approaching hurricane.

In September 2011, Hurricane Irene posed a threat for most of the east coast of the US and affected many colleges more severely because it occurred right at the start of the Fall semester. This presented additional obstacles for campus officials trying to move students into dorms.

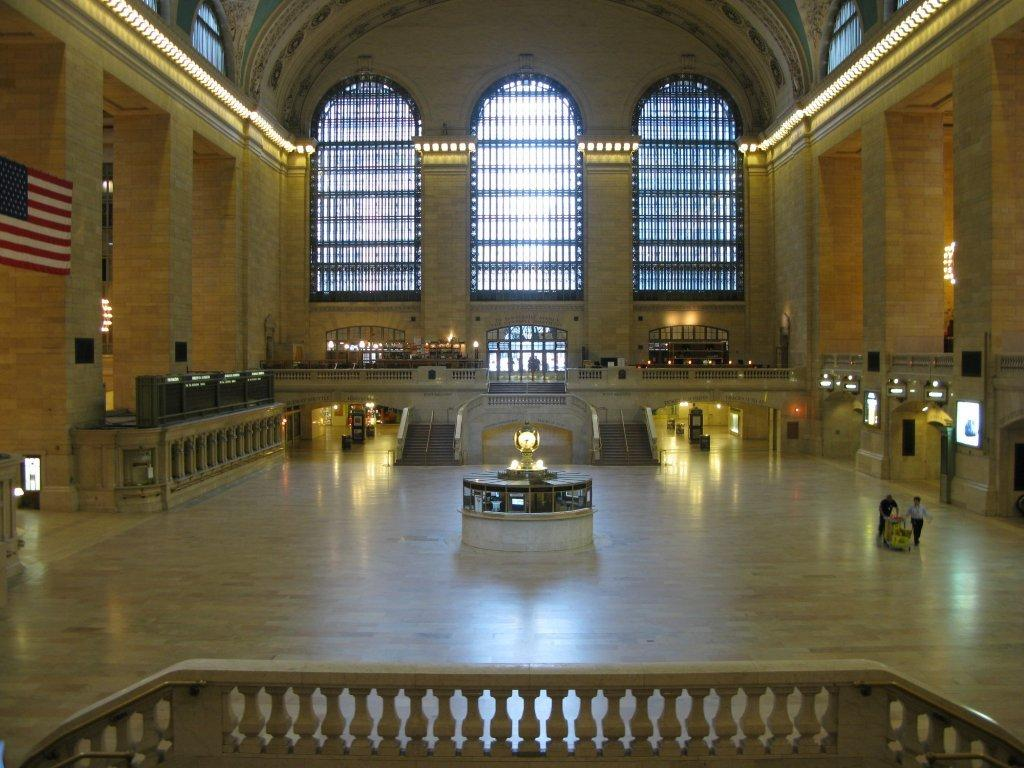
GrandCentralTerminalEmpty. MTA Metro-North Railroad closed Grand Central Terminal as Hurricane Irene approached. Photo by Metropolitan Transportation Authority / Marjorie Anders.

A few of the universities affected by the storm include University of North Carolina-Wilmington in Wilmington, NC; East Carolina University in Greenville, NC; Virginia Wesleyan College in Norfolk/Virginia Beach, VA; City University of New York (CUNY); and the University of Connecticut. Universities experienced varying degrees of damage. While some dealt with minor damage like downed trees and power lines, others dealt with leaking roofs, power outages, flooding and building damages. East Carolina University was one of the schools that had to not only recover from campus damage but also flooding in surrounding neighborhoods that made traveling to campus a hazard for faculty and students. Although damage to the campus was not severe, universities have to be aware of surrounding neighborhoods that are vulnerable to severe flooding and can halt campus operations. The flooding in various parts of Greenville, NC aided in East Carolina University being shut down for several days. This is not the first time East Carolina University has been affected by a hurricane, in September 1999, Hurricane Floyd also struck North Carolina, causing extensive damage and flooding to Greenville, NC.

In New York, students at CUNY were hindered by Hurricane Irene, not by campus damage but the public transportation system. Majority of the students at CUNY rely on the bus or train to get to campus and after the storm the New York public transportation system was not fully restored.

=== Earthquakes ===
Earthquakes happen as a result of a sudden release of energy in the Earth's crust that creates seismic waves. On the surface of the Earth this results in the shaking and sometimes displacement of the ground. Depending on the intensity of the earthquake this shaking or displacement can result in huge amounts of damage to property and loss of life. Earthquakes can also trigger other disasters that can elevate the amount of destruction or pose new threats not associated with the actual earthquake.

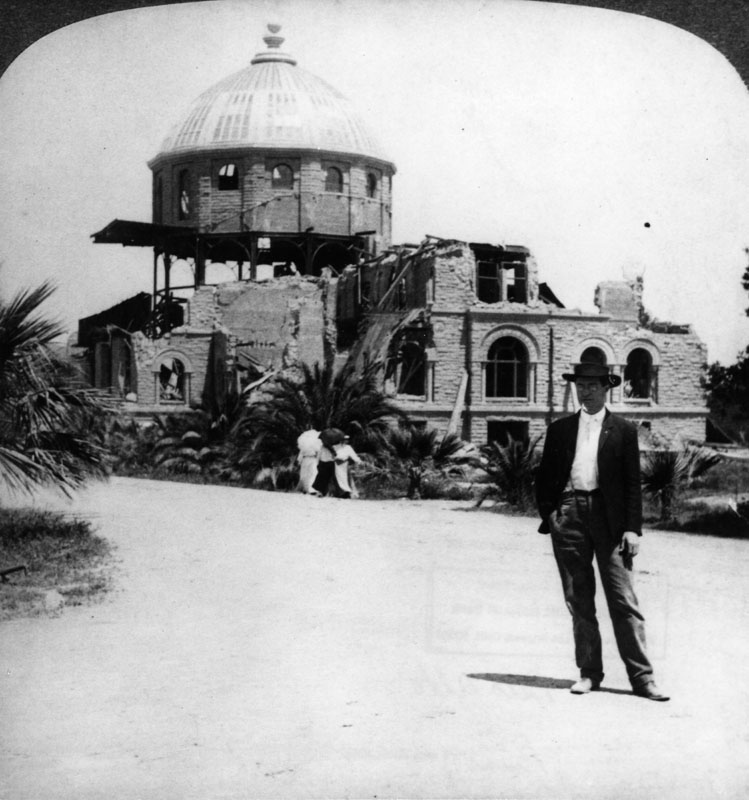
StanfordLibrary-1906: The library of Stanford University is reduced to ruins after the 1906 San Francisco earthquake, 1906.

Some examples of threats that earthquakes cause are landslides, avalanches, fires, soil liquefaction, tsunamis, and floods. Usually earthquakes occur along the edges of oceanic or continental plates, however they can also happen far away from the edge of a plate, in faults or cracks in the earth's crust. In the US people think earthquakes only occur in areas like California and Alaska. Although earthquakes are typical in places like these, they can also happen in other areas of the country and they have. Earthquakes have the potential to occur in places that they don't usually happen in and they can affect Universities in areas that are not located in typical earthquake zones. Due to this unpredictable nature universities in all regions are working to have a response plan in place, just as a precaution. Several universities have been affected by earthquakes and the experiences can be viewed as examples of what to expect in a disaster like this.

On November 5, 2011 Oklahoma was hit by a 5.6 magnitude intraplate earthquake. The US Geological Survey (USGS) reported that it was the most powerful earthquake to ever hit Oklahoma. The earthquake caused damage ranging from residential structural damage to buckled highways. There was also damage to local St. Gregory's University in Shawnee. Benedictine Hall, which is the central feature at the university and houses their administration offices, library, and most of their classes, was damaged by the disaster. Prior to the earthquake the historic building, which opened in 1915, had 4 turrets, however the shaking caused one to collapse completely and severely damaged the other 3. The damage to the building caused the university to close the Monday after the earthquake due to safety precautions. According to university officials, at the time they were unsure of where they would hold classes since the building would have to be closed until repairs could be made. The restoration of the building, which is equivalent to a 10-story building, would require a large crane for repairs. The 2011 Oklahoma earthquake provided an example of how an earthquake can affect a university campus and disrupt daily operations with no notice. Other universities are now able to use this event as an example when preparing for, responding to, and recovering from the unpredictable effects of natural disasters.

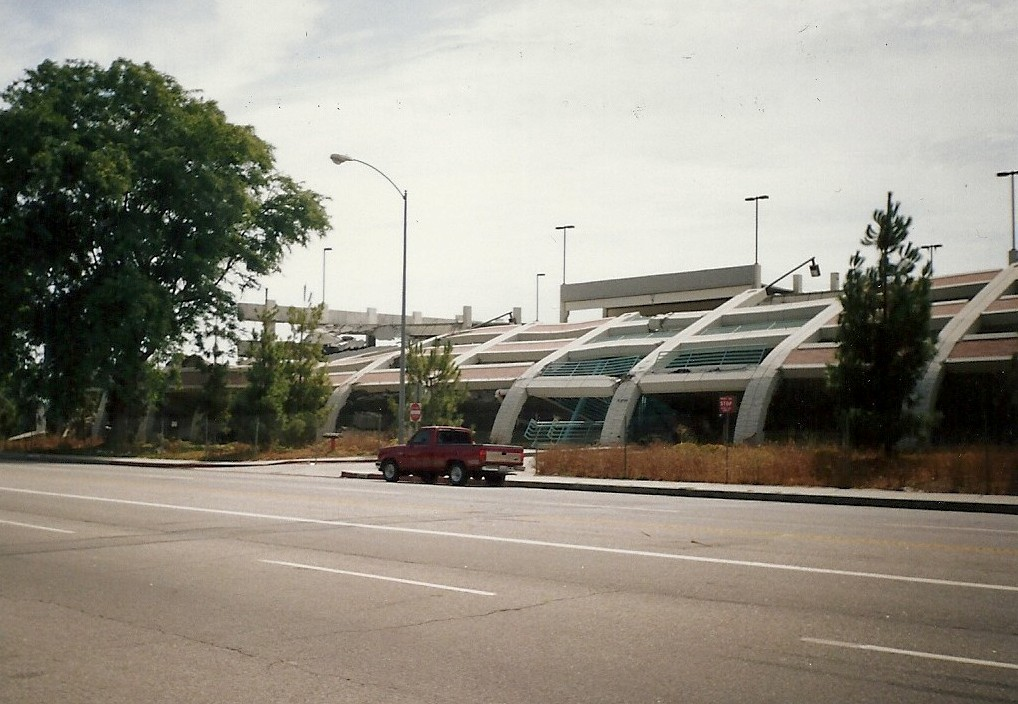
California State University Northridge Earthquake damage, August 1994. Parking structure at California State University, over 6 months after the Northridge earthquake, California, USA.

Two universities that have experienced a lot of damage due to earthquakes are Stanford University and California State University in Northridge. Stanford University was first affected by the 1906 San Francisco earthquake which destroyed much of the original construction on campus. Two of the buildings most badly damaged by the 1906 earthquake were the Old Gymnasium and campus library, these two elaborate buildings had been damaged before they were occupied so Stanford officials decided to demolish them completely. In 1989 Stanford sustained further damage after the Loma Prieta earthquake, which caused them to permanently close the Old Chemistry Building which had been commissioned before the 1906 earthquake occurred. Many of the campuses historical buildings that had been damaged by both the 1906 and 1989 earthquakes. After the Loma Prieta earthquake Stanford implemented an expensive capital improvement plan to retrofit and renovate older buildings for new, up-to-date uses. On January 17, 1994 California State University at Northridge was also devastated after the Northridge earthquake. The epicenter of the destructive earthquake was only two miles away resulting in the campus suffering heavy damage to many buildings and the collapse of a parking structure. The earthquake caused more than $400 million in damages, which at the time was the largest amount of damage done to an American University.

=== Flooding ===
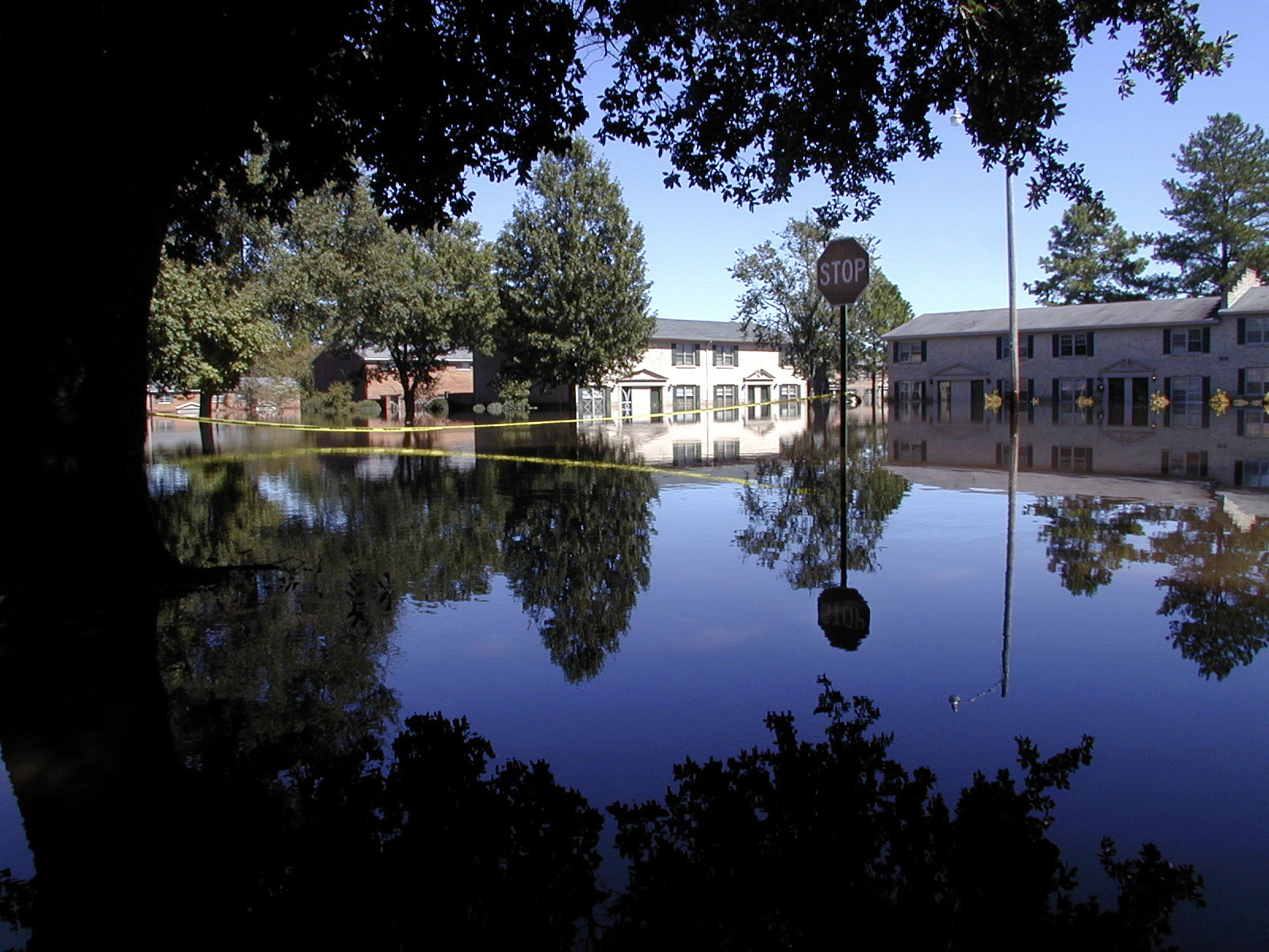
FEMA - 229 - GREENVILLE, NC, September 25, 1999 -- East Carolina University student housing suffered a major blow displacing several thousand students. Many or most of which lost some or all of their possessions. There are fewer rentals available because of the over demand brought on by the floods. Shown here are the Tar River Estates located a few blocks from the ECU campus. Photo by DAVE GATLEY/FEMA

There are several types of flooding that can occur and although some geographic regions are more prone to flooding, this type of disaster can happen anywhere. Coastal, riverine, estuarine, and human induced flooding are just a few of the types that can occur. Coastal flooding can occur as a result of heavy rains or other disasters like hurricanes or tsunamis. Riverine and estuarine floods can occur inland and in coastal areas as a result of run off, hurricanes, heavy rains, and other factors. In many cases low-lying areas near bodies of water or with insufficient drainage solutions are more susceptible to being damaged by flooding first, but universities evaluate all areas of their campus that could potentially be damaged by heavy rains and other problems that come with flooding. Several Universities have been the victims of dangerous flooding that has adverse effects on property and loss of life. In 2011 Hurricane Irene left several New England college campuses and surrounding areas damaged from flood waters. Castleton State College's athletic building was so severely damaged that it will have to be gutted and renovated. All five of Vermont's state colleges lost internet connection when the Winooski River flooded and overpowered the Web Services Center. Wheaton College in Norton, Massachusetts experienced power outages and flooding, which forced them to send students home. Plymouth State University in New Hampshire suffered flood damages to its new Ice arena and Welcome Center as well as many of its facilities building.

In North Carolina, Hurricane Irene also did damage to universities like East Carolina University, where flooding and building damage occurred. As in most cases of university flooding many of the surrounding roadways were either flooded or blocked by debris and downed trees, forcing the university to close for several days.

In some cases flooding can be devastating to student property. Some universities have parking lots that are located in low-lying areas that are prone to flooding. Both East Carolina University in Greenville, NC and the University of Hartford in West Hartford, CT have vulnerable parking lots and have become accustomed to flooding problems. However, in September 2011, flooding of Park River, which runs through Hartford's campus, caused cars to float into and on top of each other.

Some universities have invested in expensive methods to help protect their campuses and students from natural disasters such as flooding. After the devastating Hocking River flood of 1968, Ohio University funded a project to reroute a 5-mile strip of river that would have run through the present day campus. Constructed by the Army Corps of Engineers, the new river channel has been estimated to carry three times what the old river could have, reduced the chances of flooding by 86%, and has prevented an estimated $800,000 in annual flood damage. The project allowed the university to expand into the river's former flood plain without having to pay for damages every year and reduced putting students at risk. At a cost of almost $11 million in 1969 this is an expensive choice in mitigation for a university to fund, but it has saved approximately $48 million in flood damage since its construction. Ohio University recognizes its history of flood related disasters and outlines its evolution in Then & Now a video documenting the history of flooding on the Athens campus.

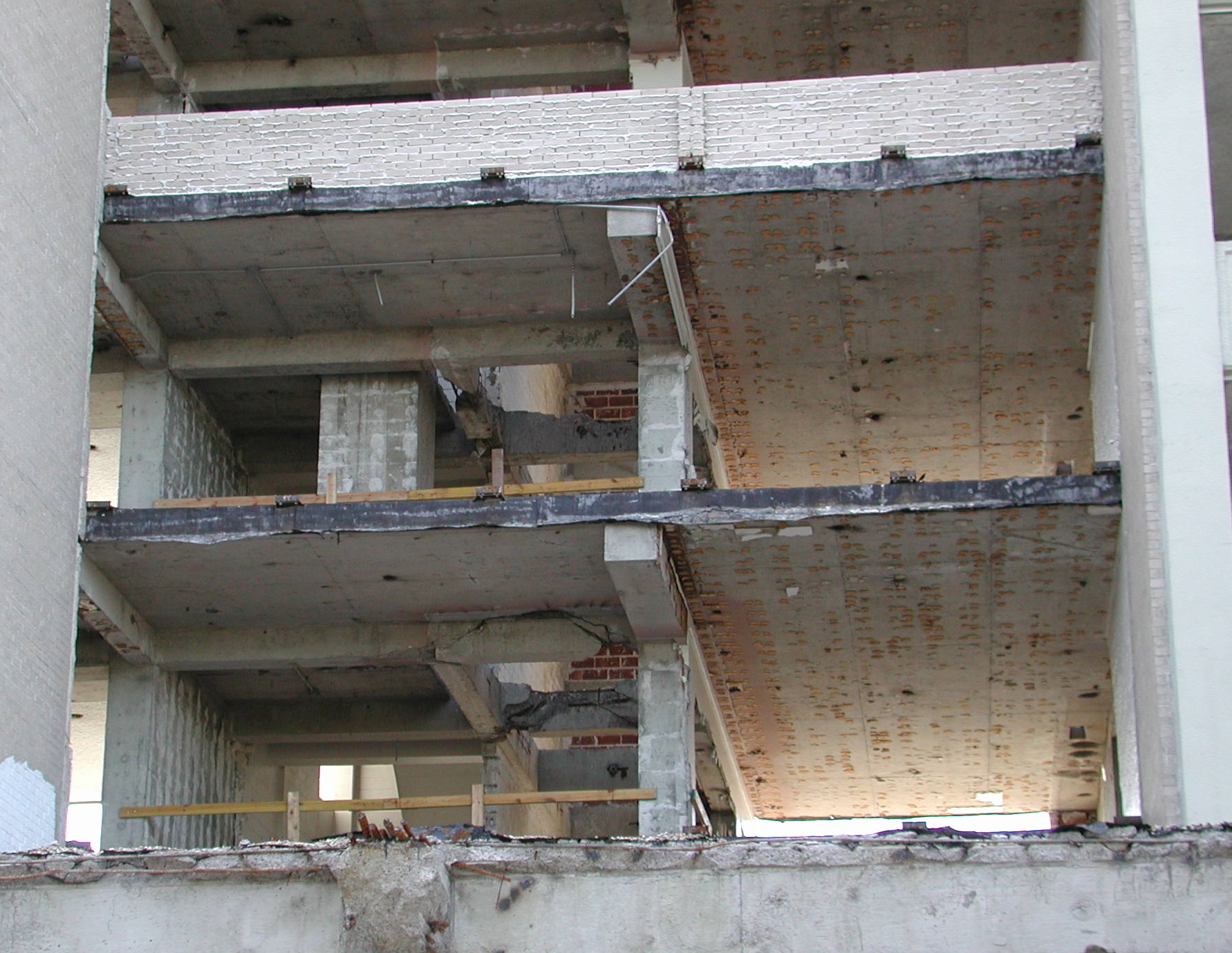
Tulane Married Student Housing: Tulane University, Claiborne Avenue. Rosen House building was damaged in Katrina and the levee failure disaster and is being demolished.

Campuses that have experience extreme devastation due to flooding and other natural disasters often have multiple hurdles to over come during the recovery phase. Sometimes this recovery phase can cause massive financial loss in addition to physical struggles. In 2005, after Hurricane Katrina devastated the city of New Orleans, Tulane University closed its doors for 4 months. Flooding and extensive damage to half of the campus forced it to cancel fall semester and try to relocate all of its students to other universities while recovery efforts took place. When Tulane reopened its doors in Spring of 2006, it faced a budget shortfall and had to create a Renewal Plan that reduced its operating budget drastically. The Renewal plan altered the entire university structure causing it to cut many academic programs and laying off a large portion of its staff (2,000 part-time employees in September and October 2005, 243 non-teaching personnel in November 2005, 230 faculty members in December 2005, and another 200 employees in January 2006). The Renewal Plan received mix feelings and a lot of backlash by several groups including American Association of University Professors, the Save Tulane Engineering Campaign, as well as students and faculty. Despite backlash, campus officials reported that approximately 94% of Tulane University students returned in for the Spring 2006 semester. The flooding and damage that occurred as a result of Hurricane Katrina disrupted the campus operations and forced a restructuring of its entire academic system.

=== Tornadoes ===
A tornado is a rotating, funnel-shaped cloud that extends from a thunderstorm to the ground with whirling winds that can reach 300 miles per hour. Although the weather channel can sometimes attempt to predict when a tornado will hit and where, sometimes they occur with little or no time for a warning to be given. Generally tornadoes occur near the trailing end of a thunderstorm and can sometimes be seen forming. It is a common misconception that tornadoes only occur in areas like Tornado Alley, however they have been observed on every continent except Antarctica. Since Tornadoes have the ability to strike quickly with no warning and cause extreme devastation American universities are learning to be aware of their vulnerability and risk. All Universities prepare for the worse even if tornadoes do not typically happen in their vicinity.

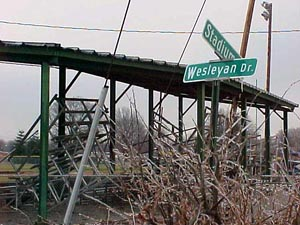
FEMA - 649 - Photograph by Jason Pack taken on 01-03-2000 in Kentucky. The bleachers at Kentucky Wesleyan College's baseball stadium are now scrap metal after a violent F3 tornado ripped struck the campus.

On June 2, 2011 a tornado touched down in Springfield, Massachusetts and a second touched down in Westfield, Massachusetts hour later. As a result of the tornado that caught many people in Massachusetts by surprise, Springfield College also received damage to its campus. Their most severe damage occurred at International Hall, an 8-story student residence hall. The campus also suffered damage to 2 other residence halls and a power house. The college bounced back quickly as the extensive repairs were completed by mid-August so that students could return to the dorm.

During the 2011 Super Outbreak, several Alabama community colleges suffered damage to their campuses. Wallace State Community College in Hanceville, Alabama experienced water damage and structural roof damage to several buildings. Despite the many downed power lines and debris all over the campus, no injuries were reported so the campus recovered well after being closed for a few days. Shelton State Community College in Tuscaloosa, an area hit hardest by the storms, was also closed for several days while officials assessed the damage. Nearby the University of Alabama decided to cancel final exams for students and postpone commencement ceremonies due to campus damage. Since many colleges in the storms path were warned of the damage it could do, they acted ahead and cancelled classes, a call which kept many students out harms way. Many of these campuses remained for a couple days after the storms due to power outages.

Also during the April 25–28, 2011 tornado outbreak, tornadoes affected two North Carolina Universities; Saint Augustine's college and Shaw University. While Saint Augustine's college reopened after a couple of days, Shaw University closed its doors for the rest of the Spring 2011 semester. Shaw University sustained heavy damage to the Willie E. Gary Student Center, which houses the dining hall, taking away its ability to provide dining services from approximately 2,700 students. The small campus located in the center of Raleigh was unable to provide alternate dining options and made the decision to end the semester a little earlier due to the damage. The early end to the semester presented a number of other challenges regarding academics and current grades in classes. Shaw University President Irma McClaurin sent out an official letter concerning the closing of the university and what effects it would have on end of semester events (Message from the President). In addition to the student center damage, many of the dorms and an office building was damaged. Shaw University's alumni association worked on helping out of state and international students get home while campus officials focused on helping students in need and assessing the damage. The damage done to Saint Augustine's college was able to be repaired in 3 days so that students and faculty could return to campus and finish out the semester.

== Man-made disasters ==
Campus vulnerabilities resulting from man-made causes can cause losses in life and property unless proper public safety guidelines are implemented by campus officials. Recent campus crisis events have brought greater awareness to failures in existing university public safety policies at many schools. For some of these institutions, a restructuring of currently implemented policy has been undertaken, in order to ensure greater preparedness for the wide variety of man-made emergencies that can occur in a campus setting. From the active shooter scenarios to theoretical pandemic disease outbreaks on campus, ensuring preparedness for campus emergencies may involve addressing a variety of artificially created vulnerabilities in order to keep the students and faculty protected from loss of life and property.

=== Campus shootings ===
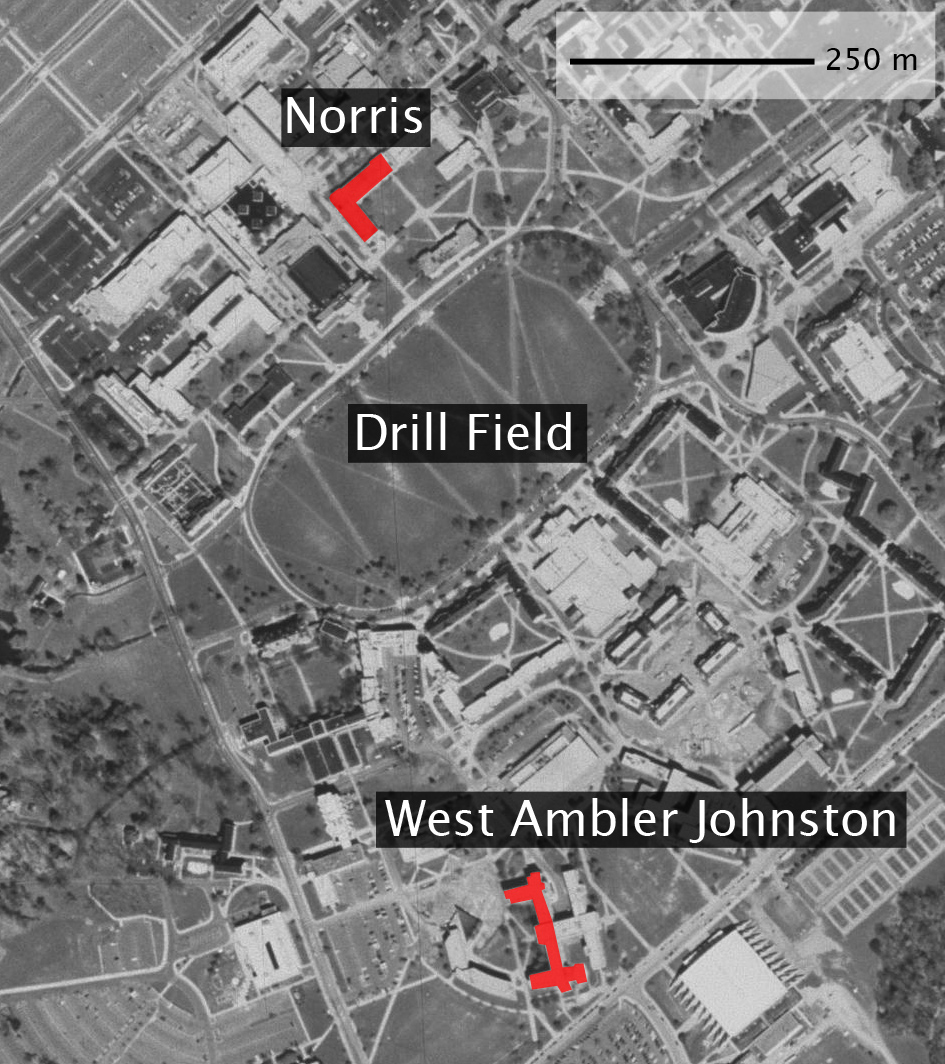
Map of the Virginia Tech Massacre

Campus shooting are one of the dominant man-made vulnerabilities on American college campuses today. Following high-profile incidents such as the 2007 Virginia Tech shootings, many universities have been forced to redesign existing response plans in order to better address the variety of threats posed by gun violence situations. These events have led to new discourse on a state and local government level about several issues, including the prevention of campus gun violence, the release of relevant threat information to at-risk students, and reconsideration of standards for public safety from gun violence.

Active shooters, as was present in the 2007 Virginia Tech scenario, are characterized by their use of weapons to inflict deadly force on an unrestricted number of victims. In April 2012, the deadliest active shooting incident since the Virginia Tech shootings took place at Oikos University in Oakland, California. Unlike the Virginia Tech shootings, this incident was characterized by its brief timespan and the comparatively low loss of life. However, the two incidents echoed similar breakdowns in campus prevention efforts. Both perpetrators felt ostracized and isolated in their campus communities, and were not properly identified as potential threats to the campus community by the existing mental health resources on campus. As a result of unsuccessfully addressed mental health issues, these individuals were radicalized into unpredictable, unprecedented violence in their campus communities.

In order to better prepare for situations involving these unpredictable threats, discourse on campus safety has emphasized several key objectives to decrease campus vulnerability to shooting scenarios. The first of these measures, prevention, centers around providing mental health assistance to at-risk students before they are radicalized into gun violence. Second, the dissemination of relevant information concerning the threat is a priority to effective public safety measures, a precaution that was mishandled at Virginia Tech, resulting in the vulnerability of the greater student and faculty body who were unaware of the active shooter threat. Finally, university safety standards must be upheld to ensure that students who are unaware of a dangerous situation are protected. Breakdowns in information dissemination to students and personnel in a dangerous situation can leave these individuals at a greater risk for contact with the threat. To prevent such a situation of individualized vulnerability from occurring, campus officials attempting to implement active shooter response plans may choose to ensure communication and lock-down procedures are effectively utilized in attempt to prevent active shooters from gaining control of an environment and causing further losses.

=== Bomb situations ===
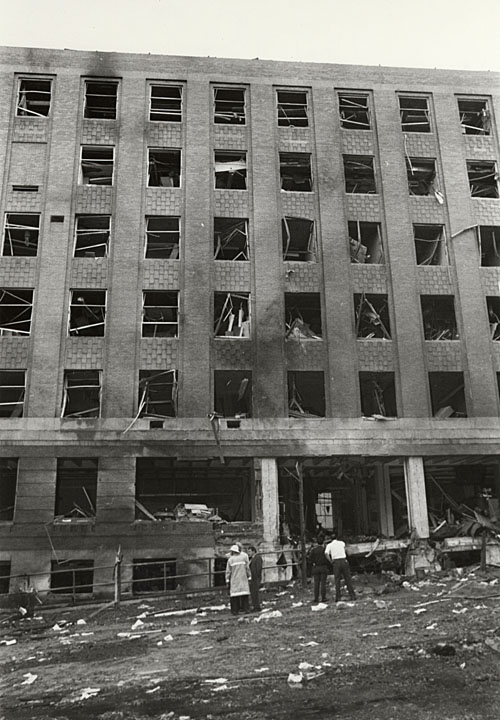
Sterling Hall after the bombing

As evidenced by the 1970 bombing of Sterling Hall at the University of Wisconsin-Madison, Campus bomb situations require a flexible yet comprehensive plan for responding to threats, particularly when threats occur during a period of high student concentration on campus. Occurring less frequently than other campus emergency situations, bomb situations can pose a variety of threats to college campuses. Campus bomb threat safety plans begin with the verification of threat, involving an in-depth search of campus to determine the threat's location. Following the identification of the vulnerability, the safe and ordered evacuation of potential victims from the risk area becomes an emergency management priority. Current bomb threat guidelines popularize the controversial theory that prevention of panic is more strategically advisable than the dissemination of all immediate information, advocating the use of code words to prevent panic and ensure an organized evacuation. A situational hierarchy is also advisable for enforcement, to implement a defined, chain of command-based, decision-making process to reduce the ambiguity in chaotic crisis situations.

In the case of the Sterling Hall bombing, advanced preparedness was impossible. The bombers did not utilize bomb threats to make the vulnerability known, and as a result, there was a loss of life involved with the crisis. The university's best course of action involved the response to the emergency, mainly the safe evacuation of the building's other inhabitants, and isolation of the campus from further harm. Other college campuses may choose implement response plans evolving from this instance of a fatal campus bombing emergency in order to assess potential shortcomings existing in their own emergency management policies.

=== Hostage situations ===
Hostage situations on college campuses are complicated scenarios made worse by the increased concentration of innocent bystanders within the campus area. Hostage situations typically require multiple sets of action plans: the hostage, the campus official identifying the situation, and the senior campus official on scene. In situations where a hostage crisis is being carried out in a campus setting, the chief responsibilities of relevant campus officials may include accurate observations of the situation, broken down by the sample plan into a worksheet identifying the demands, mental state, and description of the hostage taker. Officials may also choose to notify the proper external authorities, in order to secure the safety of the rest of campus, and taking care that media relations are carried out by the relevant authority. Timely notification of the authorities is crucial in these situations to ensure that experienced strategies are used to effectively bring an end to the emergency with a minimum cost to life or property.

In a hostage crisis at Dyersburg State Community College, a lone gunman held a mathematics class hostage for nine hours before engaging in a shootout with law enforcement officials. The situation was complicated by the fact that despite attempts by the college to control the flow of information, rumors about the situation created a convergence of concerned students and relatives on the campus. The Dyersburg Community College incident provides several insights into the failing of current university standards for hostage crisis guidelines, including the importance of providing relevant information for concerned parents about on-campus situations to retain as much control over the situation as possible. In a campus hostage situation, officials may choose to prioritize the appropriate steps to inform concerned family members and the media of relevant information in order to prevent the spread of panic-inducing rumors around the campus community. From these lessons, other university campuses taking steps to improve their existing hostage crisis plans may achieve a more comprehensive level of preparedness in the event that this emergency occurs.

=== Chemical hazards ===
Campus chemical hazards can occur as short-notice, varied instances that are difficult to prepare for. Chemical spills requiring organized response guidelines typically consist of either major or minor chemical spills. Major chemical spills involve either high quantities of a substance, or any spilled quantity of a harmful chemical substance. Minor spills consist of chemicals do not pose a significant risk to human health. In campus situations where research or academic uses of dangerous chemicals are often required, detailed response plans are a necessity for ensuring the safety of students in these situations. A sample response plan from the University of Arkansas emphasizes quick, effective strategy for containing chemical spill situations in a campus setting. Some key strategies from the sample response plan include notifying first responder officials through 911 with a brief but detailed description of the emergency, which sets in motion the relevant chain of command for chemical-related emergency response, and setting off fire alarms to initiate an evacuation of the building in its entirety.

A chemical spill in a lab at Central Michigan University serves as an example for the implementation of clear, comprehensive emergency protocols. The incident, which left one individual injured after the spill of chemicals, resulted in the safe, effective evacuation of the building. Even in this scenario, however, when a minor spill was successfully contained with minimal injuries, communication lapses prevented potentially at-risk individuals from understanding the actual situation. Other universities who are implementing chemical accident policies may use the experience of the Central Michigan lab accident to create more comprehensive plans that successfully communicate the potential situation to relevant individuals.

=== Biological hazards ===
Biohazard

Communicable disease outbreaks are no stranger to college campuses, due to the highly concentrated population of individuals present in a comparatively small environment. Incidents such as the H1N1 outbreaks can potentially have serious consequences on university communities if action plans to ensure preparedness for a pandemic outbreak have not been implemented. Organizing plans for campus disease outbreak scenarios can be a difficult process, due to the fluctuating nature of these biological hazards. In situations where large numbers of students reside in close quarter situations, key objectives to planning emergency guidelines include an emphasis on prevention and response. Prevention strategies for campus outbreaks include stringent hygiene practices to prevent contamination or infection. Preparedness for the possibility of an outbreak can include the implementation of a command hierarchy and action guidelines, in order to ensure the most effective response.

In the event of an outbreak, however, campus officials can prepare to adequately handle the unique scenario presented by a high concentration of students in a comparatively small area. Some strategies that may be taken to prepare for the possibility of quarantine include ensuring that student health centers are able to make use of specially designated centers for assessing whether individuals are infected. In the event of a quarantine, campuses preparedness may address the basic needs of isolated students, providing pre-packaged utensils and non-perishable food items. Campuses may also utilize take-out options in order to reduce the risk of the disease spreading through the student and faculty body. Steps may be taken to ensure that adequate lines of communication for concerned families and students seeking information are established, in order to prevent an overload of resources. In a campus setting, pandemic disease protocol can ideally address the concerns of prevention, isolation, and containment comprehensively in order to protect the campus from greater vulnerability to disease risk.

=== Radiological hazards ===
Radiation warning symbol

Radiological hazards are a fact of life for American college campuses located near nuclear facilities. These facilities require the development of a comprehensive public safety plan to prepare for radiological emergencies that may occur near a university population. A common factor in campus nuclear emergency preparedness plans is the establishment of a widely available method of information, typically radio stations assigned to inform the public of pertinent news and safety recommendations. The State University of New York at Oswego, located within the ten-mile zone of local nuclear power plants, has also established a safe-distance congregation center in the event of an evacuation, with arranged transportation for students without transportation. Campus officials may also need to manage the lines of communication, ensuring that while students have enough information on the emergency, they are also prevented from flooding the lines of communication and hindering response activities.

In the event that a radiological accident occurs under academic conditions, campuses such as Tuskegee University are forming comprehensive risk plans to address potential campus emergencies in the event of a lab accidents. Campus officials attempting to address these situations must prioritize the safe evacuation of building occupants, and containing the spill to avoid further harmful contamination. Notification of the proper authorities in instances of radiation lab accidents is typically required by state laws in addition to campus safety regulations, in order to most effectively handle any instances of contamination. Evacuation also enables the relevant authorities to carry out comprehensive cleaning procedures, as well as analyzing the full risks of the incident, which may not be readily apparent in a radiological emergency.

== Phases of emergency management ==
It is essential for a university to have a well designed plan of procedures to respond to an emergency situation. These plans of response provide the entire campus with specific guild lines to properly prepare, respond, and recovery in the event of an emergency. The entire university including facility members, students, staff, and campus police should all be familiar the plan's procedures, and use it as quick reference for effective action. Emergency Procedures for an American university are not completely uniform nationwide, but the majority of universities model their plans based on the National Response Plan.

=== Preparedness/mitigation ===
In order to respond effectively to any emergency situation a University must first establish a crisis communication plan and emergency operations plans, these plans create the hierarchy of decision making, and form the coordination of communications between the university, the media, and the public. The University of East Carolina has instituted an effective crisis communication plan and emergency operations plans, that can be used as example for all Colleges. East Carolina University emergency operations plans main purpose is to "establish a comprehensive, all-hazards approach to managing disasters and emergencies at ECU across a spectrum of activities including preparedness, response, recovery, and mitigation", while the plan also "describes both authorities and practices for managing and coordinating the response to incidents that range from the serious but isolated, to large-scale incidents and natural disasters". This plan is designed to respond to any emergency situation by underlining duties, roles, and responsibilities through the chain of command. After a chain of command has been established it is critical to have a coordination of communication to "address media relations and communications issues, as well as identifies procedures for the rapid identification of potentially harmful situations and the methods for responding to these situations quickly and effectively" East Carolina crisis team consist of a minimum of 11 members ranging from the chancellor to the university attorney, each with their own specific duties and roles. The crisis communication plan breaks down into three objectives: 1) assess the situation and determine whether a communication response is warranted 2) assemble a crisis communication team that will make recommendations on appropriate response 3)implement immediate action. To avoid any other unnecessary risk from a disaster a University will immediately notify the entire campus using their emergency notification system. Virginia Tech has established a notification system that many other colleges models, because the system uses several different information deliver methods to reach the entire campus. Student, staff, and faculty will receive a phone alert, text message, along with an email notification. The reason for the numerous delivery methods is that they can come at any given point in time, and one method might be a better form of communication to reach a person then another. When a University is properly prepared with an emergency operation plan and crisis communication plan, effectively responding to an emergency situation is possible.

=== Response ===
Under the 4 phases of emergency management, the way a University responds to a disaster can have the greatest effect on the overall outcome of the situation. To establish an effective response plan, many higher education institutions specify specific levels of disaster to identify the scope of the incident. Stanford University implemented a three level system to pinpoint the appropriate measures of actions based on the campus goals, to protect life and safety, secure critical infrastructure and facilities, and resume teaching and research programs. A level one occurrence is classified as a minor localized department or building problem, usually the incident falls along the lines of an odor complaint, water leak or localized chemical spill. An incident of this level does not require the university to activate the emergency plan and typically does not require a campus wide notice. Level two disasters is considered a major emergency that disrupts a sizable portion of the campus community; building fires or explosions, bio-terrorism threats, and major chemical spills are just some of the examples of a level two disaster Responding to a level two situation requires the emergency plan to be activated, and calls for quick assistance from external organizations due to the fact that these disasters tend to escalate quickly and have serious consequences to life and safety. If a disaster is designated a level three it involves the entire campus and the surrendering community, the effects are typically wide range and complex. Level three disasters requires extensive cooperation with external jurisdiction, as well as university officials to establish and mobilize to the emergency command center. The significance of each level helps Stanford University to effectively respond to a disaster with the applicable measures necessary to ease the situation. Universities that respond in a manner similar to Stanford response plan will prove to lessen the damage caused by the disaster, and place the campus in a good position to recover.

=== Recovery ===
Depending on the type of disaster, an American University will need to invoke their preplanned recovery action plan; this plan is designed to recuperate any losses the campus may have sustained. Recovery plans begin once the emergency management plan is deactivated and conditions of the situation subsidize and normal campus operations can resume; formal announcements are broadcast by the Incident Commander through all of the University's emergency information and notification systems. Once normal campus operations resume a cost and damage analysis is to be completed by the financial office committee. Many University also mandate a plan reassessment, usually conducted through the use of surveys, this reassessment is used to evaluate the effectiveness of the response. Another critical part of the recovery process is to reestablish the University's computer and information systems, these system are critical to the overall operations and functions of the institution, the plan require cooperation from all departments campus wide. The Louisiana Delta Community College among with many other schools base its technology recovery plans off of the Baylor University Center for Computing and Information Systems Disaster Recovery Plan; this plan breaks down into a two step process depending on the severity of the situation. Step one entails a partial recovery of university data including recovery of as many files and folders as possible, email accounts, data sources, and website contents. The partial recovery helps jump start normal university operations but many tasks are still not possible. Step two describes a full system recovery, that is only possible if little damage was substantiated to the universities servers. The Louisiana Delta Community College will try to recover the entire student database, staff email, network file storage, and website content. Each step in the recovery process is essential to bring the University to back to normal functions and operations.

== Conclusion ==
Emergencies across different American Universities occur frequently which often cause detrimental outcomes. These hurricane, earthquake, flooding, and man made disasters require effective, issue sensitive policies to best meet the needs of the university communities in a crisis situation. Each institution must deal with different resources and threats in order to minimize the potential losses of life or limb, resulting in unique responses to perceived risks. Natural disasters and man made disasters can all have their effect on an American universities and must be handled in an organized manner to avoid chaos during these frantic situations and universities all across America try and do so by already having a written plan out. The four phases of emergency management are in place to help ensure that the public remains calm and prepared, as well as to attempt at retaining the pre-disaster quality of life as much as possible during these unpleasant situations. When a disaster of a serious magnitude takes place, there must be a clear action plan implemented, in order to control the situation and eventually rebuild from the destruction of the crisis.
