= Oklahoma Office of Homeland Security =

Agency overview
- Formed: April 2004
- Headquarters: Oklahoma City, Oklahoma
- Employees: 12 (FY 2024)
- Agency executives: Tim Tipton, Homeland Security Advisor; Rohit Rai, Director
- Parent agency: Oklahoma Department of Public Safety
- Website: www.homelandsecurity.ok.gov/

The Oklahoma Office of Homeland Security (OKOHS) is an agency of the Oklahoma state government that is responsible for reducing the state's vulnerability to acts of terrorism and for minimizing and recovering the damage caused by terrorist attacks. OKOHS is a division of the Oklahoma Department of Public Safety.

The Office is headed by a Director of Homeland Security who is appointed by the Governor of Oklahoma. The inaugural Director, Kerry Pettingill, was appointed by Governor Brad Henry in January 2004. On February 10, 2011, Governor Mary Fallin appointed Kim Edd Carter as the second Director of OKOHS.

== History ==
In the wake of the September 11 attacks, the need for defensive approach on American soil was seen, and along with the United States Department of Homeland Security, many states organized their own versions of Homeland Security agencies. After the Oklahoma State Senate passed Joint Resolution 42 in February 2002. The Oklahoma Office of Homeland Security was officially formed in July of that year, but was not its own agency and relied on other state agencies. In January 2004, Oklahoma Governor Brad Henry sent a letter to the U.S. Department of Homeland Security designating the Office as the State Administrative Agency (SAA) – the single state agency responsible for the delivery of federal homeland security training, equipment funding and technical assistance. In April 2004, the Legislature passed House Bill 2280 – the Oklahoma Homeland Security Act. Governor Brad Henry signed the bill and formally created the standalone agency – the Oklahoma Office of Homeland Security.

== National Emergency Management System (NIMS) ==
This is a program that was organized and created along with the OKOHS. This program is done in part of cooperating with the federal government (which is required to use the NIMS framework in effort to aide and support state and local authorities), and other states in effort of national homeland security. It is the first-ever standardized approach to incident management and response. Developed by the United States Department of Homeland Security and put into action in March 2004, it establishes a uniform set of processes and procedures that emergency responders at all levels of government will use to conduct response operations. The National Incident Management System (NIMS) integrates effective practices in emergency response into a comprehensive national framework for incident management. The purpose of this program is to enable federal, state, and local authorities to respond to any domestic incident regardless of its urgency, size of the threat.

=== Divisions ===
- Administration
- Awareness & Preparedness
- Grants & Finance
- Interoperable Communications Planning
- Prevention & Intelligence
- Response & Recovery Planning

== State Fusion Center ==
Fusion centers operate as state and major urban area focal points for the receipt, analysis, gathering, and sharing of threat-related information between federal; state, local, tribal, territorial (SLTT); and private-sector partners.

== See also ==
- Oklahoma Department of Public Safety
- Oklahoma Department of Emergency Management
