= New Orleans Office of Homeland Security & Emergency Preparedness =

The New Orleans Office of Homeland Security & Emergency Preparedness (NOHSEP) was formed in 2008 following the merger of the Office of Emergency Preparedness and Office of Homeland Security. It serves as the “umbrella” public safety agency for the City of New Orleans, coordinating with agencies such as the New Orleans Police Department, New Orleans Fire Department and New Orleans Emergency Medical Services.

== Agency overview ==
NOHSEP is responsible for developing and implementing the city’s emergency management framework, regularly conducting training exercises to ensure preparedness. It manages the City Emergency Operations Center (CEOC), where city, regional, and state stakeholders coordinate responses to emergencies and disasters affecting the city and surrounding areas. The office is structured into two divisions: Response & Interoperability and Planning & Preparedness.

The agency oversees the NOLA Ready preparedness program, which includes the NOLA Ready Emergency Alert System, which is New Orleans’ emergency preparedness program. It keeps residents informed through alerts, social media, public events, and multilingual resources while partnering with nonprofit disaster response groups. The program also runs the NOLA Ready Volunteer Corps, supporting emergency efforts and promoting community resilience year-round.

== Programs and initiatives ==
NOHSEP administers various specialized programs to enhance emergency preparedness:

- Integrated Chemical Security Program (ICSP): A program that uses data to identify and address chemical, biological, radiological, and nuclear (CBRN) threats. It works with the CDC and Louisiana Department of Health to prepare for public health emergencies through the Cities Readiness Initiative and Strategic National Stockpile program.
- Local Emergency Planning Committee (LEPC): The office uses subcommittees focused on areas like utilities, schools, and hazard prevention to improve teamwork and planning.
- StormReady Certification: NOHSEP partners with the National Weather Service to create severe weather response plans and is recognized as a StormReady city.
- Louisiana Task Force One (LA-TF1): NOHSEP supports an urban search and rescue team made up of emergency responders from New Orleans and nearby parishes like Jefferson, St. Bernard, and Plaquemines, strengthening the region’s disaster response.
