= Alabama Department of Homeland Security =

Alabama agency designed to combat terrorism

Agency overview
- Formed: June 18, 2003
- (etc.)
- Type: Department of Homeland Security
- Jurisdiction: Alabama
- Headquarters: Montgomery, Alabama
- Agency executive: Hal Taylor, Secretary of Law Enforcement
- Parent agency: United States Department of Homeland Security

The Alabama Department of Homeland Security (AL DHS) is a state agency with the executive branch of the Alabama State government designed to develop, coordinate, and implement of a state policy to secure the State of Alabama from terrorist threat or attack. It was established by the Alabama Homeland Security Act of 2003 (Code of Alabama 1975, § 31-9A) which was signed on June 18, 2003 by Governor Bob Riley. The Director of the Alabama Department of Homeland Security is Jay Moseley.

Alabama is the first state in the United States to create its own legislatively enacted Cabinet-level Department of Homeland Security.

The AL DHS co-sponsored "Be Ready Camps" with the Alabama Department of Education and Governor's Office of Faith-based and community initiatives.

== Purpose ==
The purpose of the Alabama Department of Homeland Security is "to work with federal, state, and local agencies, as well as the private sector, in order to develop a strategic plan to prevent, protect against, respond to, and recover from terrorist attacks within the State of Alabama." It is also responsible for administering homeland security grants and coordinating all homeland security related actions within the state of Alabama.

The functions and all other activities of the Alabama Department of Homeland Security are considered functions and protected by the State of Alabama governmental immunity.

== Funds ==
As per the Alabama Homeland Security Act of 2003(Act 2003-276, p. 658, §4), the Alabama Department of Homeland Security is designated as the principal state agency to coordinate the receipt, distribution, and monitoring of all funds available from any source for the purpose of equipping, training, research, and education in regard to homeland security related items, issues, or services. The department is further designated and authorized to coordinate and establish standards for all operations and activities of the state related to homeland security efforts.

The Alabama Department of Homeland Security, however, does not have any power or authority to interfere with any funds from any source specifically appropriated for the Alabama State Port Authority, the Birmingham Airport Authority, the Huntsville Airport Authority, the Mobile Airport Authority, and the Montgomery Airport Authority.

== Director of Alabama Department of Homeland Security ==
As per Alabama Homeland Security Act of 2003(Act 2003-276, p. 658, §5), the Director shall be appointed by and hold office at the pleasure of the Governor and shall be subject to confirmation by the Senate. (The first Director, James M. Walker, Jr., was not subject to confirmation by the senate). The salary of the director is set by the Governor of Alabama.

The director, subject to the direction and authority of the Governor of Alabama, shall be the executive head of the department and shall be responsible to the Governor for coordinating, designing, and implementing Alabama's program for homeland security. The director shall be the principal point of contact for and to the Governor of Alabama with respect to homeland security issues.

=== Powers and Duties of the Director ===
The Director of the Alabama Department of Homeland Security receives intelligence information from federal authorities relating to homeland security and ensure that, to the extent allowed by law, all appropriate and necessary intelligence and law enforcement information regarding homeland security is disseminated to and exchanged among appropriate executive departments responsible for homeland security, and where appropriate, promote the exchange of such information with county and local governments and private entities.

The director has the following responsibilities:

- To assist in planning and executing exercises and simulations designed to practice those systems that would be utilized in response to a terrorist threat or attack within Alabama.
- To assist in state efforts to ensure public health preparedness for a terrorist event.
- To engage in the exchange of information with the United States federal government relating to immigration and efforts to improve the security of the borders, territorial waters, and ports of the United States.
- To coordinate the efforts to protect the people of Alabama and Alabama's critical infrastructure from terrorist attack, including, but not limited to, energy production, transmission and distribution systems, telecommunications, nuclear facilities, public and privately owned information systems, special public and private events, transportation hubs and networks, livestock, water, food supplies, and research institutions.
- To Ensure that state, county, and local governmental agencies and authorities coordinate and cooperate with private sector security forces responsible for the protection of critical infrastructure consistent with federal laws and regulations applicable to private sector security forces related to homeland security issues.
- To coordinate the strategy of the Executive Branch for communicating with the public in the event of a terrorist threat or attack within the State of Alabama. The director shall also coordinate the development of programs for educating the public about the nature of terrorist threats and the appropriate precautions and responses.
- To provide information and advice to the Director of Finance and to the Permanent Joint Legislative Committee on Finances and Budgets on the level and use of funding for state departments and agencies relating to homeland security. Prior to the Alabama Governor transmitting the annual budget to the Legislature, the director shall certify to the Director of Finance the funding levels that are necessary and appropriate to carry out the homeland security activities of the Executive Branch.
- To prepare a comprehensive plan and program for homeland security, such plan and program to be integrated and coordinated with the plans of the federal government and of other states to the fullest possible extent, including plans for the security of critical infrastructure licensed or regulated by agencies of the federal government.
- To cooperate with the President and the heads of the armed forces, with the U. S. Department of Homeland Security, and with the officers and agencies of other states in matters pertaining to the security and defense of the state and nation.
- To assist in the utilization of the services and facilities of existing officers and agencies of the state and the political subdivisions of the state for homeland security issues.

The governor can grant additional authority, duties, and responsibilities provided that they are within (Act 2003-276, p. 658, §5).

The Director cannot impose security requirements on any private sector facility that are inconsistent with existing or future requirements applicable to private sector facilities pursuant to federal law or regulations, including those adopted by the Nuclear Regulatory Commission, the Federal Energy Regulatory Commission, the federal Department of Homeland Security or other federal agencies.

== Homeland Security Task Force ==
The Homeland Security Task Force meets at least twice each year and when convened by the Governor of Alabama for the purpose of advising the Homeland Security Director on the comprehensive plan and program for homeland security and other matters as determined by majority vote of the task force.

The task force consists of the following members:

- The Governor of Alabama, as Chairman
- The Director of the Alabama Department of Homeland Security
- The Director of Emergency Management of Alabama
- The Adjutant General of Alabama
- The Attorney General of Alabama
- The Commissioner of Agriculture and Industries of Alabama
- The State Health Officer of Alabama
- The Director of Public Safety of Alabama
- The Director of Transportation of Alabama
- The Director of Finance of Alabama
- The Director of the Alabama Port Authority of Alabama
- The State Fire Marshal of Alabama
- A representative of county governments appointed by the Governor of Alabama
- A representative of municipal governments appointed by the Speaker of the House of Representatives of Alabama
- A representative of county law enforcement agencies appointed by the Speaker of the House of Representatives of Alabama
- A representative of municipal law enforcement agencies appointed by the President Pro Tempore of the Senate of Alabama
- A representative of paid fire departments appointed by the President Pro Tempore of the Senate of Alabama
- A representative of volunteer fire departments appointed by the Speaker of the House of Representatives of Alabama
- A representative of local emergency management agencies appointed by the Speaker of the House of Representatives of Alabama
- A representative of local emergency communications districts appointed by the Lieutenant Governor of Alabama
- A representative of the airport authorities located within the state appointed by the Lieutenant Governor of Alabama
- A representative of the Judicial Branch of Government of Alabama appointed by the Chief Justice of the Alabama Supreme Court of Alabama

(The representatives are made from a list of three nominees).

And other representatives as deemed necessary and appointed by the Governor of Alabama, and approved by the legislative oversight committee of Alabama.

== Division ==
The Alabama Department of Homeland Security is divided into four areas:

- Borders, Ports and Transportation
- Science and Technology
- Information Management and Budget
- Emergency Preparedness and Response
