= Iowa Department of Homeland Security and Emergency Management =

Agency in the US state of Iowa

Agency overview
- Formed: 11 May 1965
- Jurisdiction: State of Iowa
- Motto: Prevent ⋅ Protect ⋅ Respond ⋅ Recover
- Agency executive: John Benson, Director of Iowa HSEMD
- Website: https://homelandsecurity.iowa.gov/

The Iowa Department of Homeland Security and Emergency Management (HSEMD) is a governmental agency of the US State of Iowa managing disasters, grants, and programs such as 911.

== History ==
HSEMD was founded on May 11, 1965, as the State Civil Defense Agency.

In January 2021, Paul Trombino III was appointed director of the agency after Joyce Flinn retired. He resigned in May 2021 to "pursue other opportunities". John Benson was made interim director in June.

== Organization ==
The three branches of the HSEMD are Response, Recovery and Administration. The state is divided into districts.

== Budget ==
As of 2021, the budget of the HSEMD is $273,370,646.

=== Flood Mitigation Board ===
The Flood Mitigation Board received $6 billion for flood projects like those in Cedar Rapids and Dubuque.

== See also ==
- List of state departments of homeland security
