= Oklahoma Emergency Response Act =

Oklahoma State Legislature
- Full name: Oklahoma Emergency Response Act
- Signed into law: July 1, 1993
- Governor: David Walters
- Code: Title 27A (Environment and Natural Resources)
- Section: 4-1-101 through 4-1-106
- Website: 27A O.S. Section 4-1-101

The Oklahoma Emergency Response Act (27A O.S. Section 4-1-101 – 4-1-106) is an Oklahoma state law governing emergency response through the state. The act creates a network for rapid response to hazardous material incidents and other events that threaten the public health and safety. It is also used to respond to dangerous threats to the natural environment of the state.

The Emergency Response Act was signed into law by Governor David Walters on July 1, 1993.

== See also ==
- Oklahoma Emergency Management Act of 2003
- Catastrophic Health Emergency Powers Act
- Oklahoma Emergency Interim Executive and Judicial Succession Act
- Oklahoma Emergency Management Interim Legislative Succession Act
