= 2013 Oklahoma state budget =

2013 Budget of the Oklahoma state government
SB 1975 - Fiscal Year 2013 General Appropriations
- Submitted: February 6, 2012
- Submitted by: Mary Fallin
- Submitted to: 53rd Legislature
- Passed: May 29, 2012
- Country: Oklahoma
- Total revenue: $6.6 billion (Governor estimated) $6.8 billion (Budget deal estimated)
- Total expenditures: $6.6 billion (Governor requested) $6.8 billion (Budget deal enacted)
- Debt payment: $170.9 million
- Debt: $1.6 billion
- Website: http://www.ok.gov/osf/Budget/index.html Oklahoma Office of State Finance

The Oklahoma State Budget for Fiscal Year 2013, is a spending request by Governor Mary Fallin to fund government operations for July 1, 2012 – June 30, 2013. Governor Fallin proposed the budget on February 6, 2012. This was Governor Fallin's second budget submitted as governor.

The Oklahoma Legislature approved the budget on May 25, 2012, and Governor Fallin signed the budget into law on May 29, 2012.

== History ==
On February 6, 2012, Republican Governor of Oklahoma Mary Fallin proposed her $6.6 billion Executive Budget for Fiscal Year 2013. In accordance with the Oklahoma Constitution, the budget was balanced. Fallin's FY-2013 budget is flat compared to the 2012 Oklahoma state budget.

Fallin submitted her proposal to the heavily-Republican dominated Oklahoma Legislature. In early May 2012, after months of debate and review by House and Senate budget committees, the Senate and House convened the Joint Committee on Appropriations and Budget to address the FY13 budget. After months of review and debate, late in May 2012, Governor Fallin and the legislative leadership reached a $6.8 billion budget deal, an increase of $200 million over Fallin's original proposed budget. The increase is approximately 3.2% more than the FY-2012 budget.

The Republican dominated Senate passed the budget deal on May 22 by 30–15 vote, exactly along party lines. The Republican dominated House then addressed the budget on May 24. After an initial vote of 47–47 in which 17 House Republicans joined with all 30 House Democrats to vote against the bill. The House Democrats believed the bill did not provide adequate funding to education services while the several House Republicans believed the budget spent too money in total.

After a long recess the House reconvened and passed the budget 52–42, with 12 Republicans voting against the bill. 5 House Republicans who had originally voted against the budget switched their vote to ensure passage of the bill. Not a single Democrat in either the Senate or House voted in favor of the budget. Governor Fallin signed the 2013 budget bill on May 29, 2012.

== Governor's major issues ==
In her Budget Message to the Legislature, Governor Fallin identified the following issues are major goals for her Executive Budget.

=== Tax reform ===
- Restrucrture personal income tax structure from seven brackets at top marginal rate of 5.25 to three brackets at top marginal rate of 3.5
- Eliminate $200 million in annual tax credits
- Save $300,000 in Oklahoma Tax Commission administrative costs due to tax code restructure
- Appropriate $7.9 million to Oklahoma Teachers' Retirement System due to reduced income tax revenues

=== Government efficiency ===
- Appropriate $3.5 million to Oklahoma Office of State Finance to create transparent performance evaluation system for State agencies

=== Energy ===
- Save $300-$500 million over ten years by directing all State agencies and higher education institutions to reduce energy consumption by 20 percent by 2020

=== Health ===
- Appropriate $1.5 million to Certified Health Schools Reward Program to provide financial rewards to healthy schools
- Appropriate $1.7 million to reduce infant mortality
- Appropriate $3.1 million to establish 40 new residency slots in five rural hospitals
- Appropriate $2.5 million to establish one additional community-based mental illness crisis center
- Appropriate $0.5 million to fund mental health screenings in county jails
- Appropriate $3.1 million for State match of federal Systems of Care Grant
- Hold health and human services agencies harmless from the loss of federal American Recovery and Reinvestment Act funds:
  - Oklahoma Health Care Authority: $70.8 million
  - Oklahoma Department of Human Services: $22.6 million
  - Oklahoma Department of Mental Health and Substance Abuse Services: $4 million
  - Oklahoma Department of Health: $0.6 million
  - J.D. McCarty Center: $0.4 million
  - Oklahoma Office of Juvenile Affairs: $0.3 million
- Transfer state matching dollars for behavioral health services from Oklahoma Health Care Authority to Oklahoma Department of Mental Health and Substance Abuse Services, including associated $136 million

=== Transportation ===
- Appropriate $15 million to Oklahoma Department of Transportation to address failing roads and bridges
- Increase cap on State ROADS Fund from $435 million to $550 million, generating an additional $479 million over eight years
- Re-appropriate $20 million annually from Oklahoma Department of Transportation to the various counties
- Oklahoma Turnpike Authority to increase capacity of Creek Turnpike and Kilpatrick Turnpike

=== Other initiatives ===
- Appropriate $5 million to cover debt service associated with bond issue of approximately $50 million to repair and upgrade Oklahoma State Capitol building
- Appropriate $6 million to State Emergency Fund to cover future emergencies
- Appropriate $2 million to Oklahoma Office of the Chief Medical Examiner in order for agency to regain national accreditation
- Appropriate additional $1 million to Oklahoma Department of Commerce to protect United States military establishments in State
- Appropriate $5 million to Quick Action Closing Fund to attract new businesses to State
- Appropriate $5 million to Office of the Oklahoma Attorney General to defend State against lawsuits from tribal governments regarding water rights
- Save $4.2 million from enacted Oklahoma Office of State Finance consolidations
- FY-2012 Supplemental Appropriations:
  - Department of Education - $37.6 million for flexible benefit allowance
  - State Emergency Fund - $34.1 million to eliminate backlog of State reimbursements to local government
  - Oklahoma Department of Public Safety - $6 million to conduct Oklahoma Highway Patrol Academy to train new State Troopers
  - Oklahoma Office of the Chief Medical Examiner - $1 million to fund national reaccreditation

== Budget deal ==
On May 21, 2012, Governor Fallin, President pro tempore of the Oklahoma Senate Brian Bingman, and Speaker of the Oklahoma House of Representatives Kris Steele reached a new budget deal worth $6.8 billion, an increase of $200 million over Fallin's original proposed budget. The additional revenues will come from redirecting agency-collected fees to the State's general fund.

As part of the budget deal, Governor Fallin and the legislative leadership approved the following appropriation issues:

- Oklahoma State Department of Education - $52.4 million annualized funding for teacher health benefits and National Board Certified Teacher bonuses
- Oklahoma Department of Career and Technology Education - $1.4 million annualized funding for operations, matching an FY 2012 supplemental measure
- Oklahoma State Regents for Higher Education -
  - $10 million annualized funding for operations, matching an FY 2012 supplemental measure
  - Transfer $161 million to university endowed chairs programs
  - $3 million for the Wayman Tisdale specialty health clinic in Tulsa
  - $3.08 million for the OSU College of Osteopathic Medicine to fund the rural residency program to increase access to health care in rural and underserved areas
- Oklahoma Department of Transportation - $99 million increase to repay FY-2012 fund transfer
- Oklahoma State Department of Health - $1 million increase for infant mortality initiatives
- Oklahoma Health Care Authority - $57 million for low income and disabled citizens
- Oklahoma Department of Human Services -
  - $25 million to fund DHS reforms
  - $17 million to replacement of one-time funding in FY-2012
  - $1.5 million for Advantage Waiver Program to provide reimbursement rate increases for home health care providers that serve the elderly
  - $1.5 million to provide Developmental Disabilities Services Division reimbursement rate increases
  - $1 million to reduce the current Developmental Disabilities Services Division waiting list
- Oklahoma Department of Mental Health and Substance Abuse Services -
  - $5.5 million for additional crisis center to assist those with mental health and/or substance abuse and addiction problems
  - $667,000 for mental health and substance abuse screenings to determine the risks and needs of each convicted offender
- Oklahoma Department of Veterans Affairs - $1 million increase to expand nursing staff and reduce staff/patient ratios
- Oklahoma Department of Public Safety - $5 million for Oklahoma Highway Patrol Academy to train new State Troopers
- Oklahoma Office of Medicolegal Investigations - $1 million supplemental and $1.5 million annualization of supplemental for personnel, equipment, and infrastructure improvement

== Total spending ==
=== Requested ===
The governor's proposed Executive Budget for 2013 totals $6.6 billion in spending. Figures shown in the spending request do not reflect the actual appropriations for Fiscal Year 2013, which must be authorized by the Legislature. Percentages in parentheses indicate percentage change compared to FY2012 enacted budget. The budget request is broken down by the following expenditures:

- Appropriations by Cabinet Department: $6.6 billion (+1.9%)
  - $3.4 billion - Education (+0%)
  - $1.2 billion - Health (+0%)
  - $716 million - Human Services (+0.4%)
  - $662 million - Safety and Security (+2%)
  - $207 million - Transportation (+93%)
  - $87.4 million - Finance and Revenue (+4.2%)
  - $84.4 million - Judiciary (+0.1%)
  - $80.3 million - Commerce and Tourism (+0%)
  - $35.2 million - Agriculture (+0%)
  - $34.7 million - Veterans Affairs (+0%)
  - $30.6 million - Legislature (+0%)
  - $29.0 million - Human Resources and Administration (+20.8%)
  - $17.8 million - Science and Technology (+0%)
  - $13.1 million - Environment (+0%)
  - $12.1 million - Energy (+0%)
  - $10.2 million - Military (+0%)
  - $8.4 million - Secretary of State (+0%)
  - $2.5 million - Governor and Lieutenant Governor (+0%)

=== Enacted ===
The Oklahoma Legislature approved total appropriations for fiscal year 2013 of $6.8 billion. Percentages in parentheses indicate percentage change from fiscal year 2012 final appropriations. The final appropriations for Fiscal Year 2013 are broken down by the following expenditures:

- Appropriations by Cabinet Department: $6.8 billion (+3.2%)
  - $3.4 billion - Education (+0%)
  - $1.3 billion - Health (+8%)
  - $766 million - Human Services (+7%)
  - $665 million - Safety and Security (+0%)
  - $207 million - Transportation (+0%)
  - $109 million - Finance and Revenue (-7%)
  - $84.6 million - Judiciary (+0%)
  - $80.0 million - Commerce and Tourism (+0%)
  - $37.7 million - Agriculture (+7%)
  - $35.7 million - Veterans Affairs (+3%)
  - $32.7 million - Legislature (+7%)
  - $17.8 million - Science and Technology (+0%)
  - $14.8 million - Environment (+13%)
  - $12.1 million - Energy (+13%)
  - $10.7 million - Military (+5%)
  - $8.4 million - Secretary of State (+0%)
  - $2.7 million - Governor and Lieutenant Governor (+8%)
- Numbers have been rounded
