= Oklahoma Emergency Management Interim Legislative Succession Act =

Oklahoma state law determining succession for the state legislature

Oklahoma State Legislature
- Full name: Emergency Management Interim Legislative Succession Act
- Signed into law: August 29, 2003
- Governor: Brad Henry
- Website: 63 O.S. Section 686.1

The Emergency Management Interim Legislative Succession Act (63 O.S. Sections 688.1 - 688.14) is an Oklahoma state law governing emergency succession to the all offices members of the Oklahoma Legislature. The similar Act governing the members of the state and local governments is the Oklahoma Emergency Interim Executive and Judicial Succession Act.

The Emergency Legislative Succession Act was signed into law by Governor Brad Henry on August 29, 2003.

== In General ==
Each legislator must designate no less than three and no more than seven Emergency Interim Successors to his powers and duties and specify their order of succession. Each house of the Legislature, in accordance with its own rules, determines who is entitled under the provisions of the Emergency Legislative Succession Act to exercise the powers and assume the duties of its members. When an Emergency Interim Successor exercises the powers and assumes the duties of a legislator, the Successor is accorded the privileges and immunities, compensation, allowances and other perquisites of office to which a legislator is entitled.

== See also ==
- Oklahoma Legislature
- Oklahoma Emergency Management Act of 2003
- Oklahoma Emergency Response Act
- Catastrophic Health Emergency Powers Act
- Oklahoma Emergency Interim Executive and Judicial Succession Act
