= List of law enforcement agencies in Oklahoma =

This is a list of law enforcement agencies in the state of Oklahoma.

According to the US Bureau of Justice Statistics' 2008 Census of State and Local Law Enforcement Agencies, the state had 483 law enforcement agencies employing 8,639 sworn police officers, about 237 for each 100,000 residents.

== State agencies ==
- Attorney General of Oklahoma
- Grand River Dam Authority Police Department
- Oklahoma Alcoholic Beverage Laws Enforcement Commission
- Oklahoma Bureau of Narcotics and Dangerous Drugs Control
- Oklahoma Office of the Chief Medical Examiner
- Oklahoma Council on Law Enforcement Education and Training
- Oklahoma Criminal Justice Resource Center
- Oklahoma Department of Corrections
- Oklahoma Department of Emergency Management
- Oklahoma Department of Environmental Quality
  - Criminal Investigation Unit
- Oklahoma Department of Public Safety
  - Oklahoma Highway Patrol
  - Oklahoma Office of Homeland Security
- Oklahoma Department of Tourism and Recreation
  - Oklahoma State Park Rangers
- Oklahoma Department of Wildlife Conservation
- Oklahoma District Attorneys Council
- Oklahoma Department of Insurance
  - Anti-Fraud Unit
- Oklahoma Office of Juvenile Affairs
- Oklahoma Pardon and Parole Board
- Oklahoma State Board of Pharmacy
- Oklahoma State Bureau of Investigation
- Oklahoma State Fire Marshal
- Oklahoma Law Enforcement Retirement System
- Oklahoma Police Pension and Retirement System
- Oklahoma Department of Agriculture Investigative Services Unit
- Oklahoma Department of Human Services Office of Inspector General

== County sheriffs ==
- Adair County Sheriff's Office
- Alfalfa County Sheriff's Office
- Atoka County Sheriff's Office
- Beaver County Sheriff's Office
- Beckham County Sheriff's Office
- Blaine County Sheriff's Office
- Bryan County Sheriff's Office
- Caddo County Sheriff's Office
- Canadian County Sheriff's Office
- Carter County Sheriff's Office
- Cherokee County Sheriff's Office
- Choctaw County Sheriff's Office
- Cimarron County Sheriff's Office
- Cleveland County Sheriff's Office
- Coal County Sheriff's Office
- Comanche County Sheriff's Office
- Cotton County Sheriff's Office
- Craig County Sheriff's Office
- Creek County Sheriff's Office
- Custer County Sheriff's Office
- Delaware County Sheriff's Office
- Dewey County Sheriff's Office
- Ellis County Sheriff's Office
- Garfield County Sheriff's Office
- Garvin County Sheriff's Office
- Grady County Sheriff's Office
- Grant County Sheriff's Office
- Greer County Sheriff's Office
- Harmon County Sheriff's Office
- Harper County Sheriff's Office
- Haskell County Sheriff's Office
- Hughes County Sheriff's Office
- Jackson County Sheriff's Office
- Jefferson County Sheriff's Office
- Johnston County Sheriff's Office
- Kay County Sheriff's Office
- Kingfisher County Sheriff's Office
- Kiowa County Sheriff's Office
- Latimer County Sheriff's Office
- Leflore County Sheriff's Office
- Lincoln County Sheriff's Office
- Logan County Sheriff's Office
- Love County Sheriff's Office
- Major County Sheriff's Office
- Marshall County Sheriff's Office
- Mayes County Sheriff's Office
- McClain County Sheriff's Office
- McCurtain County Sheriff's Office
- McInosh County Sheriff's Office
- Murray County Sheriff's Office
- Muskogee County Sheriff's Office
- Noble County Sheriff's Office
- Nowata County Sheriff's Office
- Okfuskee County Sheriff's Office
- Oklahoma County Sheriff's Office
- Okmulgee County Sheriff's Office
- Osage County Sheriff's Office
- Ottawa County Sheriff's Office
- Pawnee County Sheriff's Office
- Payne County Sheriff's Office
- Pittsburg County Sheriff's Office
- Pontotoc County Sheriff's Office
- Pottawatomie County Sheriff's Office
- Pushmataha County Sheriff's Office
- Roger Mills County Sheriff's Office
- Rogers County Sheriff's Office
- Seminole County Sheriff's Office
- Sequoyah County Sheriff's Office
- Stephens County Sheriff's Office
- Texas County Sheriff's Office
- Tillman County Sheriff's Office
- Tulsa County Sheriff's Office
- Wagoner County Sheriff's Office
- Washington County Sheriff's Office
- Washita County Sheriff's Office
- Woods County Sheriff's Office
- Woodward County Sheriff's Office

== Municipal agencies ==
- Achille Police Department
- Ada Police Department
- Adair Police Department
- Agra Police Department
- Alex Police Department
- Allen Police Department
- Altus Police Department
- Alva Police Department
- Anadarko Police Department
- Antlers Police Department
- Apache Police Department
- Arapaho Police Department
- Ardmore Police Department
- Arkoma Police Department
- Arnett Police Department
- Atoka Police Department
- Avant Police Department
- Barnsdall Police Department
- Bartlesville Police Department
- Beaver Police Department
- Beggs Police Department
- Bennington Police Department
- Bethany Police Department
- Big Cabin Police Department
- Billings Police Department
- Binger Police Department
- Bixby Police Department
- Blackwell Police Department
- Blair Police Department
- Blanchard Police Department
- Boise City Police Department
- Bokchito Police Department
- Bokoshe Police Department
- Boley Police Department
- Boynton Police Department
- Bristow Police Department
- Broken Arrow Police Department
- Broken Bow Police Department
- Buffalo Police Department
- Burns Flat Police Department
- Cache Police Department
- Caddo Police Department
- Calera Police Department
- Canton Police Department
- Carnegie Police Department
- Carney Police Department
- Cashion Police Department
- Catoosa Police Department
- Cement Police Department
- Chandler Police Department
- Chattanooga (Oklahoma) Police Department
- Checotah Police Department
- Chelsea Police Department
- Cherokee Police Department
- Chickasha Police Department
- Choctaw Police Department
- Chouteau Police Department
- Claremore Police Department
- Cleveland Police Department
- Clinton Police Department
- Coalgate Police Department
- Colbert Police Department
- Collinsville Police Department
- Comanche Police Department
- Commerce Police Department
- Cordell Police Department
- Coweta Police Department
- Coyle Police Department
- Crescent Police Department
- Cromwell Police Department
- Cushing Police Department
- Cyril Police Department
- Davenport Police Department
- Davis Police Department
- Del City Police Department
- Depew Police Department
- Dewar Police Department
- Dewey Police Department
- Dibble Police Department
- Dickson Police Department
- Drumright Police Department
- Duke Police Department
- Duncan Police Department
- Durant Police Department
- Edmond Police Department
- El Reno Police Department
- Eldorado Police Department
- Elgin Police Department
- Elk City Police Department
- Elmore City Police Department
- Enid Police Department
- Erick Police Department
- Eufaula Police Department
- Fairfax Police Department
- Fairland Police Department
- Fairview Police Department
- Fletcher Police Department
- Forest Park Police Department
- Forgan Police Department
- Fort Cobb Police Department
- Fort Gibson Police Department
- Fort Sill Police Department
- Frederick Police Department
- Gage Police Department
- Gans Police Department
- Garber Police Department
- Geary Police Department
- Glenpool Police Department
- Goodwell Police Department
- Gracemont Police Department
- Grandfield Police Department
- Granite Police Department
- Grove Police Department
- Guthrie Police Department
- Guymon Police Department
- Haileyville Police Department
- Harrah Police Department
- Hartshorne Police Department
- Haskell Police Department
- Healdton Police Department
- Heavener Police Department
- Hennessey Police Department
- Henryetta Police Department
- Hinton Police Department
- Hobart Police Department
- Holdenville Police Department
- Hollis Police Department
- Hominy Police Department
- Hooker Police Department
- Howe Police Department
- Hugo Police Department
- Hydro Police Department
- Idabel Police Department
- Inola Police Department
- Jay Police Department
- Jenks Police Department
- Jones Police Department
- Kansas Police Department
- Kaw City Police Department
- Kellyville Police Department
- Keota Police Department
- Keyes Police Department
- Kiefer Police Department
- Kingfisher Police Department
- Kingston Police Department
- Kiowa Police Department
- Konawa Police Department
- Krebs Police Department
- Lahoma Police Department
- Langley Police Department
- Langston Police Department
- Laverne Police Department
- Lawton Police Department
- Lexington Police Department
- Lindsay Police Department
- Locust Grove Police Department
- Lone Grove Police Department
- Lone Wolf Police Department
- Luther Police Department
- Madill Police Department
- Mangum Police Department
- Mannford Police Department
- Marietta Police Department
- Marlow Police Department
- Maud Police Department
- Maysville Police Department
- McAlester Police Department
- McCurtain Police Department
- McLoud Police Department
- Medford Police Department
- Medicine Park Police Department
- Meeker Police Department
- Miami Police Department
- Midwest City Police Department
- Minco Police Department
- Moore Police Department
- Mooreland Police Department
- Morris Police Department
- Mounds Police Department
- Mountain View Police Department
- Muldrow Police Department
- Muskogee Police Department
- Mustang Police Department
- Newcastle Police Department
- Newkirk Police Department
- Nicoma Police Department
- Ninnekah Police Department
- Noble Police Department
- Norman Police Department
- North Enid Police Department
- North Miami Police Department
- Nowata Police Department
- Oilton Police Department
- Okarche Police Department
- Okay Police Department
- Okeene Police Department
- Okemah Police Department
- Oklahoma City Police Department
- Okmulgee Police Department
- Olustee Police Department
- Oologah Police Department
- Owasso Police Department
- Panama Police Department
- Pauls Valley Police Department
- Pawhuska Police Department
- Pawnee Police Department
- Perkings Police Department
- Perry Police Department
- Piedmont Police Department
- Pocola Police Department
- Ponca City Police Department
- Porter Police Department
- Porum Police Department
- Poteau Police Department
- Prague Police Department
- Pryor Police Department
- Purcell Police Department
- Quapaw Police Department
- Quinton Police Department
- Ramona Police Department
- Ratliff City Police Department
- Rattan Police Department
- Ringling Police Department
- Rock Island Police Department
- Roff Police Department
- Roland Police Department
- Rush Springs Police Department
- Ryan Police Department
- Salina Police Department
- Sallisaw Police Department
- Sand Springs Police Department
- Sapulpa Police department
- Sawyer Police Department
- Sayre Police Department
- Seiling Police Department
- Seminole Police Department
- Sentinel Police Department
- Shady Point Police Department
- Shattuck Police Department
- Shawnee Police Department
- Skiatook Police Department
- Snyder Police Department
- South Coffeyville Police Department
- Spavinaw Police Department
- Spencer Police Department
- Sperry Police Department
- Spiro Police Department
- Stigler Police Department
- Stillwater Police Department
- Stilwell Police Department
- Stonewall Police Department
- Stratford Police Department
- Stringtown Police Department
- Stroud Police Department
- Sulphur Police Department
- Tahlequah Police Department
- Talala Police Department
- Talahina Police Department
- Tecumseh Police Department
- Temple Police Department
- Texhoma Police Department
- Thackerville Police Department
- The Village Police Department
- Thomas Police Department
- Tipton Police Department
- Tishomingo Police Department
- Tonkawa Police Department
- Tryon Police Department
- Tulsa Police Department
- Tupelo Police Department
- Tuttle Police Department
- Tyrone Police Department
- Valley Brook Police Department
- Valliant Police Department
- Vian Police Department
- Vici Police Department
- Vinita Police Department
- Wagoner Police Department
- Walters Police Department
- Warner Police Department
- Warr Acres Police Department
- Watonga Police Department
- Waukomis Police Department
- Waurika Police Department
- Wayne Police Department
- Waynoka Police Department
- Weatherford Police Department
- Weleetka Police Department

Wellston Police Department

- West Siloam Springs Police Department
- Westville Police Department
- Wetumka Police Department
- Wewoka Police Department
- Wilburton Police Department
- Wilson Police Department
- Wister Police Department
- Woodward Police Department
- Wright City Police Department
- Wyandotte Police Department
- Wynnewood Police Department
- Yale Police Department
- Yukon Police Department

== Public School Districts ==
- Altus Campus Police Department
- Jenks Public Schools Police Department
- Lawton Public Schools Police Department
- Tulsa Public Schools Police Department
- Putnam City Campus Police Department
- Noble Public Schools Police Department
- Muskogee Public Schools Police

== College and University agencies ==
- Bacone College
- Cameron University Police Department
- Carl Albert State College Police Department
- Central Technology Police Department
- East Central University Police Department
- Eastern Oklahoma State College Police Department
- Langston University Police Department
- Mid-America Christian University Police Department
- Northeastern Oklahoma A&M Campus Police Department
- Northern Oklahoma College Police Department
- Northeastern State University Police Department
- Northwestern Oklahoma State University Police Department
- Southwestern Oklahoma State University Police Department
- Southeastern Oklahoma State University Police Department
- Oklahoma Baptist University Police Department
- Oklahoma Christian University Police Department
- Oklahoma City Community College Police Department
- Oklahoma City University Police Department
- Oklahoma Medical Research Foundation Police Department
- Oklahoma State University Department of Public Safety
- University of Oklahoma Department of Public Safety
- Oral Roberts University Department of Public Safety
- OU Health Science Center Police Department
- Rogers State University Police Department
- Seminole State College Police Department
- Southern Nazarene University Police Department
- St. Gregory's Junior College Police Department
- Tulsa Community College Police Department
- University of Central Oklahoma Department of Public Safety

== Tribal agencies ==
- Absentee Shawnee Police Department
- Caddo Nation Police Department
- Cherokee Nation Marshal Service
- Chickasaw Lighthorse Police Department
- Choctaw Nation Law Enforcement
- Citizen Potawatomi Nation Police Department
- Comanche Nation Police Department
- Eastern Shawnee Tribal Police Department
- Iowa Tribal Police Department
- Kaw Nation Police Department
- Kickapoo Tribal Police Department
- Miami Nation Tribe of Oklahoma Police Department
- Muscogee (Creek) Lighthorse Police Department
- Osage Nation Police Department
- Otoe-Missouria Police Department
- Pawnee Nation Police Department
- Ponca Tribal Police Department
- Prairie Band Potawatomi Police Department
- Quapaw Tribal Marshal Service
- Sac & Fox Nation Police Department
- Santa Ana Tribal Police Department
- Seminole Nation Light Horse Men
- Tonkawa Tribal Police Department
- Wyandotte Nation Police Department

== See also ==
- Police
