= Oklahoma Council on Firefighter Training =

Oklahoma Council on Firefighting Training
- Council on Firefighter Training logo

Agency overview
- Formed: 2004
- Dissolved: 2017
- Superseding agency: Office of the Oklahoma State Fire Marshal
- Website: www.coft-oklahoma.org/

The Council on Firefighting Training (COFT) was the agency of the state of Oklahoma which supports Oklahoma's state, county and local fire protection agencies by identifying and recommending training needs.

In 2017, the Council was dissolved, its duties placed under the Office of the Oklahoma State Fire Marshal and reformed as the Oklahoma Firefighter Training Committee.

== Composition ==
The Council consisted of ten members, three of whom are ex officio, non-voting. All non-ex officio serve three-year terms. Member are appointed as follows:

- One member is appointed by the Oklahoma State Firefighters Association who must be a member of a fire department representing all members of paid, volunteer and combination fire departments
- One member is appointed by the Professional Fire Fighters of Oklahoma who must be a fire union officer, chief officer, or fire service instructor from a full-time paid fire department
- One member is appointed by the Oklahoma Fire Chiefs’ Association who must be a chief officer or fire service instructor from an Oklahoma combination fire department
- One member to be appointed by the State Fire Marshal Commission who must be a representative of the Oklahoma Fire Service with skills in arson investigation or code enforcement
- One member to be appointed by the Oklahoma Rural Fire Coordinators who must be a chief officer or fire service instructor from a volunteer fire department
- One member to be appointed by the Director of the State Department of Health-Emergency Medical Services Division who shall be a chief officer or fire service EMS instructor from an Oklahoma fire department
- One member to be appointed by the Director of the Oklahoma Department of Emergency Management who must be a municipal emergency management official
- The Director of Fire Service Training, Oklahoma State University, ex officio and nonvoting
- The Director of Fire Service Publications, Oklahoma State University, ex officio and nonvoting
- The Director of the Oklahoma Department of Career Technology or the Director's designee, ex officio and nonvoting

== Duties ==
The Council is responsible for identifying firefighter training needs and setting the firefighter training goals for the State. The Council interacts with the Oklahoma Department of Homeland Security on firefighter training needs and grants. The Council administers and maintains incentive and recognition programs established for Oklahoma firefighters.

The Council's primary responsibility is to submit annual recommendations regarding fire and emergency service training needs to the Governor of Oklahoma, the Speaker of the Oklahoma House of Representatives, the President pro tempore of the Oklahoma Senate.

== See also ==
- National Fire Academy
