= Albert Ashwood =

American politician

Director of the Oklahoma Department of Emergency Management
- Incumbent
- Assumed office 1997
- Governor: Frank Keating; Brad Henry; Mary Fallin

Personal details
- Born: 1959 Muskogee, Oklahoma, U.S.
- Occupation: Civil Servant
- Website: Oklahoma Department of Emergency Management

Albert Ashwood (born 1959) is an American emergency management official from the State of Oklahoma. Ashwood is the current Director of the Oklahoma Department of Emergency Management (OEM). Ashwood has served as OEM Director since 1997 when he was appointed by Republican Governor of Oklahoma Frank Keating. Ashwood has since been retained by Democratic Governor Brad Henry in 2003 and Republican Governor Mary Fallin in 2011.

== Career ==
Ashwood graduated from Muskogee High School in 1977 and began working for OEM in 1988. Following his leadership during the 1995 Oklahoma City Bombing, Governor Keating promoted Ashwood to Director of the Department.

Ashwood is currently the United States' longest serving State emergency management director. As OEM Director, Ashwood is responsible for preparing the State for natural disasters and for overseeing Statewide response to and recovery from such disasters. Ashwood reports to the Oklahoma Secretary of Safety and Security and is responsible for overseeing an annual budget of almost $60 million.

On December 14, 2010, Governor-elect Mary Fallin announced that she would retain Ashwood in his position as OEM Director in her Administration.

Political offices
Preceded by	Director of the Oklahoma Department of Emergency Management; Under Governors Frank Keating, Brad Henry, and Mary Fallin; 1997 - present	Incumbent
