= Office of the Chief Medical Examiner =

- Office of Chief Medical Examiner of the City of New York
- Oklahoma Office of the Chief Medical Examiner

== See also ==
- Chief Medical Examiner
