= Sharp v. Murphy =

- Supreme Court of the United States

Argued November 27, 2018 Decided July 9, 2020
- Full case name: Tommy Sharp, Interim Warden Oklahoma State Penitentiary, Petitioner v. Patrick Dwayne Murphy
- Docket no.: 17-1107
- Citations: 591 U.S. 977 (more) 140 S. Ct. 2412; 207 L. Ed. 2d 1043
- Argument: Oral argument

Case history
- Prior: Oklahoma state court jury convicted Murphy of murder in and imposed the death penalty; conviction upheld, sub nom. Murphy v. State, 2002 OK CR 24, 47 P.3d 876; cert. denied, 538 U.S. 985 (2003); Petition for writ of habeas corpus denied, sub nom. Murphy v. Trammell, No. 6:12-cv-00191, 2015 WL 2094548 (E.D. Okla. May 5, 2015); reversed, Murphy v. Royal, 866 F.3d 1164 (10th Cir. 2017); rehearing denied, 875 F.3d 896 (10th Cir. 2017); cert. granted, sub nom. Royal v. Murphy, 138 S. Ct. 2026 (2018).

Holding
- For Major Crimes Act purposes, land reserved for the Creek Nation since the 19th century remains Indian country.

Court membership
- Chief Justice John Roberts Associate Justices Clarence Thomas · Ruth Bader Ginsburg; Stephen Breyer · Samuel Alito; Sonia Sotomayor · Elena Kagan; Neil Gorsuch · Brett Kavanaugh

Case opinions
- Per curiam
- Dissent: Thomas, Alito (dissenters did not file or join an opinion)
- Gorsuch took no part in the consideration or decision of the case.

Laws applied
- Major Crimes Act; 18 U.S.C. § 1151

Sharp v. Murphy, 591 U.S. 977 (2020), was a Supreme Court of the United States case of whether Congress disestablished the Muscogee (Creek) Nation reservation. After holding the case from the 2018 term, the case was decided on July 9, 2020, in a per curiam decision following McGirt v. Oklahoma that, for the purposes of the Major Crimes Act, the reservations were never disestablished and remain Indian country.

In 1866, Congress established reservation boundaries for the Muscogee (Creek), Cherokee, Chickasaw, Choctaw, and Seminole Nations. The Muscogee (Creek) Nation boundaries composes three million acres in Eastern Oklahoma, including most of the city of Tulsa. The boundaries for all five nations consist of over 19 million acres and nearly the entire eastern half of Oklahoma. In 1907, Congress admitted Oklahoma to the Union as the 46th state and federal territorial courts immediately transferred all non-federal cases involving Native Americans to state courts. However, in the process, it has been found that Congress never officially disestablished the tribal reservations, a requirement for a tribal reservation to lose that status as demanded under Solem v. Bartlett (1984).

The situation arose following the appeal of a convicted murderer, Patrick Murphy, a member of the Muscogee-Creek tribe, with his crime taking place within the boundaries of Muscogee-Creek reservation as delimited by Congress in 1866. The appeal addressed whether the federal territorial courts had congressional authorization to make this transfer, as if the lands were still a tribal reservation, Murphy's crime would become subject to federal jurisdiction rather than Oklahoma. Although this case is specific to the Muscogee (Creek) Nation, the Court's decision is likely to also apply to reservations of the Cherokee, Choctaw, Chickasaw, and Seminole Nations because all five tribes have similar histories within the state of Oklahoma.

The case was first heard by the Supreme Court in its 2018–2019 term; Justice Neil Gorsuch recused himself due to having participated as a federal appellate judge when the case was heard in lower courts, which created a potential deadlock between the remaining eight Justices. The Supreme Court announced at the end of the term that it would hold additional oral arguments during the 2019 term. It also heard a second case, McGirt v. Oklahoma, in May 2020 involving similar matters and which Justice Gorsuch had no prior conflict with.

== Background ==
Boundaries of the Five Tribes in 1866

From the colonial and early federal period in the history of the United States the Cherokee, Chickasaw, Choctaw, Muscogee (Creek), and Seminole Nations became known as the Five Civilized Tribes. These are the first five tribes that Anglo-European settlers generally considered to be "civilized". The "Five Tribes" once occupied much of the land in current day Alabama, Florida, Georgia, Mississippi, South Carolina and Tennessee.

In the 1830s, Congress forcibly removed these tribes from their ancestral homelands to designated Indian Territory. The migration from these homelands to the designated territory is infamously known as the Trail of Tears. During the American Civil War, some of the tribes supported the Confederates. After the Union victory, the "Five Tribes" ceded all its territory in western Oklahoma. The Muscogee (Creek)'s present boundaries reflect two cessions. In 1856, the Muscogee (Creek) Nation "cede[d]" lands to the Seminoles. In 1866, Congress signed the Treaty with the Creek where the Muscogee (Creek) Nation "cede[d] ... to the United States" lands in return for $975,168.

In the 1880s, the "Allotment Era" swept the Western United States. The Dawes Act of 1887 (also known as the General Allotment Act or the Dawes Severalty Act of 1887) authorized the President of the United States to survey Native American tribal land and divide it into allotments for individual Native Americans. Those who accepted allotments and lived separately from the tribe would be granted United States citizenship. The Curtis Act of 1898 amended the Dawes Act to extend its provisions to the Five Civilized Tribes; it required abolition of their governments, allotment of communal lands to people registered as tribal members, and sale of lands declared surplus, as well as dissolving tribal courts.

The Muscogee (Creek) Nation reached a negotiated agreement with the federal government for the allotment of tribal lands, and Congress passed it into law in 1901. The original agreement specified that its terms would control over conflicting federal statutes and treaty provisions, but it in no way affected treaty provisions consistent with the agreement. The agreement's central purpose was to facilitate a transfer of title from the Muscogee (Creek) Nation generally to its members individually. It provided that "[a]ll lands belonging to the Creek tribe", except for town sites and lands reserved for public purposes, should be appraised and allotted "among the citizens of the tribe". In 1906, Congress passed the Oklahoma Enabling Act, which empowered the people residing in Indian Territory and Oklahoma Territory to elect delegates to a state constitutional convention and subsequently to be admitted to the union as a single union. The question before the Supreme Court is whether these laws and other similar federal statutes clearly disestablished the reservation of the Muscogee (Creek) Nation.

== Statement of the case ==
Patrick Murphy, a member of the Muscogee (Creek) Nation, murdered George Jacobs near Henryetta, Oklahoma, on August 28, 1999. Murphy was arrested after confessing the murder to Patsy Jacobs, a former acquaintance of George Jacobs. An Oklahoma state court jury convicted Murphy of murder and imposed the death penalty in 2000.

After his conviction, Murphy filed an application for post-conviction relief in an Oklahoma state court seeking to overturn his conviction by claiming the federal government had exclusive jurisdiction to prosecute murders committed by Indians in Indian country; Henryetta lies within the former boundaries of the Moscogee reservation. The state district court concluded state jurisdiction was proper because the crime had occurred on state land. Murphy appealed to the Oklahoma Court of Criminal Appeals which also determined that the state had jurisdiction. Murphy then sought habeas relief in the Federal District Court of Eastern Oklahoma. The Federal District Court determined the Oklahoma state court decisions were not contrary to federal law and denied the habeas petition. Murphy then appealed to the Tenth Circuit, which reversed the decision of the District Court. The Tenth Circuit found no prior court had reviewed whether Congress disestablished the Muscogee reservation under the tests of Solem v. Bartlett (1984), a prior case that established that only Congress has the power to disestablish native reservations. On its own analysis of all laws passed by Congress related to the tribal reservation and Oklahoma's statehood, the Tenth Circuit found no explicit statement of disestablishment. The Tenth Circuit also found that other acts of Congress around the time still treated the reservation as if it were Indian-owned land, contrary to the disestablishment intent if that had occurred. Thus, the Tenth Circuit ruled in favor of Murphy that he should have been prosecuted under federal jurisdiction.

== Supreme Court ==
The state of Oklahoma petitioned for writ of certiorari to the Supreme Court of the United States in February 2018, specifically asking the Supreme Court to rule on "whether the 1866 territorial boundaries of the Creek Nation within the former Indian Territory of eastern Oklahoma constitute an "Indian reservation" today under 18 U.S.C. §1151(a).17-1107". Since Murphy had filed a federal habeas corpus petition in his challenge to the Tenth Circuit, the opposing party to his challenge was the "authorized person having custody of the prisoner", this being Interim Warden for the Oklahoma State Penitentiary, Mike Carpenter. Carpenter was represented by attorneys that also represent the interest of the state of Oklahoma. The Supreme Court granted the petition in October 2018, with affirmation that because Justice Neil Gorsuch had participated in the case while at the Tenth Circuit but before becoming a Supreme Court Justice, he would abstain from participating in the case at the Supreme Court level.

=== Argument for the petitioner ===
In addition to the state's statements, the federal government also filed an amicus curiae brief in support of Carpenter with the concern that if the Supreme Court affirmed the federal appellate court's decision, then "the federal government would have—and the State would lack—criminal jurisdiction over crimes by or against Indians in nearly all of eastern Oklahoma". Other amicus curiae briefs in support of Carpenter were filed by the International Municipal Lawyers Association, the Oklahoma Independent Petroleum Association, the Oklahoma Sheriffs' Association, the Environmental Federation of Oklahoma, and a consolidated brief on behalf of ten other state governments.

Carpenter's attorneys argued that

1. Congress never established reservations for the Five Tribes. Although Congress established boundaries for the Five Tribes, these territorial boundaries do not meet the legal definition of a reservation.
2. Even if the boundaries meet the definition of a reservation, Congressional laws during the "Allotment Era" disestablished reservations.
3. Congress rescinded the Five Tribes' territorial sovereignty by stripping the Five Tribes of the most basic executive, legislative, and judicial functions to bestow those powers upon the new State.
4. Congress's transfer of jurisdiction over Indians to Oklahoma state courts is incompatible with the reservation status.

=== Argument for the respondent ===
Murphy was represented by his criminal defense attorneys. Amicus curiae briefs in support of Murphy were filed by the Muscogee (Creek) Nation, the Chickasaw Nation and Choctaw Nation of Oklahoma (joined by several former officials of the State of Oklahoma), the National Congress of American Indians, the Cherokee Nation (joined by historians and legal scholars), a group of former United States Attorneys, and the National Indigenous Women's Resource Center.

Murphy's attorneys argued that

1. Congress in 1866 established a reservation for the Muscogee (Creek) Nation.
2. The Supreme Court has clearly and resolutely affirmed that Solem v. Bartlett provides the “well settled” framework for assessing disestablishment.
3. The test provided in Solem to determine whether a reservation has been disestablished has not been met.
4. Although Congress established the Muscogee (Creek) Nation over 150 years ago, it is a well-established rule that courts will not repeal a statute unless Congress's intention is clear and manifest.

=== Proceedings ===
The original name of this case was Murphy v. Royal. Terry Royal, the Warden at Oklahoma State Penitentiary, accepted another job and resigned in good standing prior to briefings in the case. Before his resignation, Royal filed a petition for writ of certiorari with the Supreme Court on February 6, 2018. The Court granted the petition on May 21, 2018. On July 25, 2018, the case was renamed Carpenter v. Murphy to reflect the appointment of Mike Carpenter as Interim Warden of the Oklahoma State Penitentiary.

The case's first oral arguments were heard on November 27, 2018. Attorneys for Mike Carpenter, Oklahoma State Penitentiary Interim Warden, argued that Congress has clearly disestablished the Muscogee (Creek) Nation Reservation. Carpenter is backed by attorneys for the state of Oklahoma and the United States Solicitor General. Attorneys for Patrick Dwayne Murphy argued that there is no clear intention of Congress to disestablish the Muscogee (Creek) Nation Reservation. Murphy is backed by the National Congress of American Indians and other American Indian organizations. The Justices raised concerns about the practicality of deciding that much of Oklahoma would be classified as an Indian Reservation, which would potentially affect the livelihood of 1.8 million residents.

With Tommy Sharp named as Interim Warden of the Oklahoma State Penitentiary, the case was renamed Sharp v. Murphy in July 2019.

Because of Gorsuch's recusal on the case, it is believed the remaining eight justices remained deadlocked on the case. In the 2019–20 term, the Supreme Court accepted the case of McGirt v. Oklahoma (Docket 18-9526) which deals with a similar matter of jurisdiction related to the former Indian reservations, but in which Gorsuch had no prior involvement, allowing all nine justices to hear the issue.

=== Decision ===
Sharp was decided per curiam on the basis of McGirt, with both decisions issued on July 9, 2020. From McGirt, the Supreme Court ruled in a 5–4 decision, with Gorsuch joined by Justices Ruth Bader Ginsburg, Stephen Breyer, Sonia Sotomayor, and Elena Kagan, that Congress had failed to disestablish the former reservation lands, and thus for purposes of the Major Crimes Act, those lands should be treated as "Indian country". The Sharp per curiam opinion upheld that decision, though Justices Clarence Thomas and Samuel Alito dissented.

The per curiam decision affirmed the Tenth Circuit's decision, which overturned the state's conviction against Murphy. The Oklahoma Court of Criminal Appeals reviewed the conviction in 2020 and under McGirt, ruled the state did not have jurisdiction to prosecute Murphy. He was transferred to the U.S. Marshal Service and was given a federal jury trial, which convicted him in August 2021 on three felony counts including second-degree murder.

== Impact ==
The rulings in Sharp and McGirt have had a significant impact on the state of Oklahoma, particularly on past criminal convictions, where the Oklahoma Court of Criminal Appeals has broadly ruled that any crime involving Native Americans on the tribal lands in the state fall outside the prosecution of the state. This has included crimes where the perpetrator was non-Native while the victims were Native. The state has argued that this stance has created difficulties in enforcing the law in the state, and it has an interest to help protect Native citizens from crimes committed against them by non-Natives, and as of September 2021, has currently petitioned the Supreme Court to overturn some or all of McGirt based on this situation.

== See also ==
- Native American civil rights
- Native Americans in the United States
