= Oklahoma Emergency Management Act of 2003 =

Oklahoma State Legislature
- Full name: Oklahoma Emergency Management Act of 2003
- House voted: May 21, 2003 (90–8)
- Senate voted: May 28, 2003
- Signed into law: May 29, 2003
- Sponsor(s): William Paulk
- Governor: Brad Henry
- Code: Public Health Code
- Bill: House Bill 1512
- Associated bills: Oklahoma Emergency Interim Executive and Judicial Succession Act; Oklahoma Emergency Management Interim Legislative Succession Act

The Oklahoma Emergency Management Act of 2003 (63 O.S. § 683.1-683.24) is an Oklahoma state law that replaced the Oklahoma Civil Defense and Emergency Resources Management Act of 1967 as the primary state law detailing emergency management in Oklahoma. The Emergency Management Act and the Catastrophic Health Emergency Powers Act together form the primary state laws regarding emergency and disastrous situations that may occur in the state.

The Emergency Management Act was signed into law by Governor Brad Henry on May 29, 2003. Giving the Emergency Volunteers a say in their towns when disastrous situations occur.

== Purposes of the Act ==
The Emergency Management Act declares its purposes:

Because of the existing and increasing possibility of the occurrence of disasters of unprecedented size and destructiveness resulting from natural and man-made causes, in order to ensure that preparations of Oklahoma will adequately deal with such disasters and emergencies, to generally provide for the common defense and to protect the public peace, health, and safety, to preserve the lives and property of the people of Oklahoma, and to carry out the objectives of state and national survival and recovery in the event of a disaster or emergency, [the Oklahoma Emergency Management Act of 2003 is enacted].

— Oklahoma Emergency Management Act of 2003

The Emergency Management Act:

- Created of the Oklahoma Department of Emergency Management (OEM)
- Authorized of the creation of local organizations for emergency management in the counties and incorporated municipalities of this state
- Provided for the formulation and execution of an Emergency Operations Plan (EOP) for the state
- Conferred upon the Governor and upon the executive heads or governing bodies of the political subdivisions of the state emergency powers
- Provided for the rendering of mutual aid among the political subdivisions of the state and with other states to cooperate with the federal government with respect to carrying out emergency management functions and hazard mitigation
- Provided sufficient organization to meet, prevent or reduce emergencies in the general interest and welfare of the public and the state.

The Emergency Management Act declared the policy of Oklahoma to be that all emergency management and hazard mitigation functions of the state are to be coordinated to the maximum extent with the comparable functions of the federal government, of the other states and localities, and of private agencies of every type, to the end that the most effective preparation and use may be made of available workforce, resources and facilities for dealing with disaster and hazard mitigation. Each state agency, board, commission, department or other state entity having responsibilities either indicated in the state Emergency Operations Plan must have written plans and procedures in place to protect individual employees, administrators and visitors from natural and man-made disasters and emergencies occurring at their work place. All such plans and procedures are made in concurrence with OEM, which is responsible for establishing an OEM Guidebook titled the "Emergency Standard Operating Procedures". Each state agency, board, commission, department or other state entity must provide an annual report on the status of their emergency management program to OEM. OEM then must compile and integrate all reports into a report to the Governor and Legislature on the status of state emergency preparedness.

The National Incident Management System (NIMS) is officially declared to be the standard for incident management in Oklahoma. All on-scene management of disasters and emergencies shall be conducted using the Incident Command System (ICS).

== Gubernatorial emergency powers ==
Under the Emergency Management Act, the Governor of Oklahoma gains vast and comprehensive emergency powers. However, the emergency powers provided to the Governor are operative only during the existence of a natural or man-made emergency. The existence of such an emergency must be proclaimed by the Governor through executive declaration or by the Legislature by concurrent resolution for the Governor to exercise such powers. Any emergency, whether proclaimed by the Governor or by the Legislature, may be terminated by the proclamation of the Governor or by the Legislature with a concurrent resolution terminating such emergency.

Upon an emergency being declared, the Governor must activate the Emergency Operations Plan. This allows the Governor to assume direct regulatory control over all essential resources of the state. It is then the responsibility of the Governor to determine the priorities of such resources and allocate them as he deems necessary. The Emergency Management Act defines "resources" as:

...all economic resources within [Oklahoma] including but not limited to food, manpower, health and health manpower, water, transportation, economic stabilization, electric power, petroleum, gas, and solid fuel, industrial production, construction and housing.

— Oklahoma Emergency Management Act of 2003

In exercising his emergency powers, the Governor is empowered to (limited) rule by decree in the realm of public security. The Emergency Management Act requires the Governor "to enforce all laws, rules and regulations relating to emergency management" and grants him the authority to assume "direct operational control of any or all emergency management forces" in the state. Such forces include the Oklahoma National Guard, the Oklahoma Highway Patrol, and local police and sheriff departments. As such, the Governor has the authority to make, amend, and rescind necessary orders and rules to carry out the provisions of the Emergency Management Act.

If, in the Governor's opinion, an evacuation of any or all of the population of any disaster stricken or threatened area within the state is necessary, the Governor is empowered to take such steps as are necessary for the evacuation as well as the receipt and care of such evacuees. The Act grants the Governor the power to:

...perform and exercise such other functions, powers, and duties as are necessary to promote and secure the safety and protection of the civilian population and to carry out the provisions of the Emergency Operations Plan in a national or state emergency.

— Oklahoma Emergency Management Act of 2003

To enforce his orders, the Governor gains the power of emergency gubernatorial dismissal. Should any public official exercising power under the Oklahoma Constitution willfully fail to obey any order, rule or regulation issued by the Governor, the Governor may remove said official from office. Such removal, however, can only become effective after charges have been served to the affected official and the official has been given an opportunity to defend himself/herself. Pending the preparation and disposition of charges, the Governor may suspend such official for a period not exceeding thirty days. Any vacancy resulting from gubernatorial emergency dismissal or suspension is filled by an appointment made by the Governor. The appointee serves until the office can be filled as otherwise provided by law. The only officers not subject to this emergency removal process are the statewide executive offices, the Justices of the Oklahoma Supreme Court, and the members of the Oklahoma Legislature. However, these officers do not possess the power to prevent the Governor from fulfilling his duties pursuant to the Emergency Management Act.

== State emergency management programs ==
=== Emergency Management Advisory Council ===
The Emergency Management Advisory Council meets to advise the Governor and the Director of the Oklahoma Department of Emergency Management on all matters pertaining to emergency management.

The members of the Council shall be composed of the Governor, who shall serve as chair of the Council, and the following department heads:

- The Director of the Department of Emergency Management
- The Commissioner of Public Safety
- The Adjutant General
- The Commissioner of Health
- The Commissioner of Agriculture
- The Director of the Department of Human Services
- The Director of the Department of Transportation
- The Executive Director of the Water Resources Board
- The State Fire Marshal
- The Executive Director of the Department of Environmental Quality
- The President of the Oklahoma Sheriff’s Association

=== State Hazard Mitigation Team ===
The State Hazard Mitigation Team meets as determined by the Team Coordinator to review and recommend updates to the State Comprehensive All-hazard Mitigation Plan.

The State Hazard Mitigation Team is composed of the administrative heads of the following agencies or their designees:

- The Oklahoma Department of Emergency Management, who shall serve as the Team Coordinator
- The Oklahoma Water Resources Board
- The Oklahoma Climatological Survey
- The Oklahoma Conservation Commission
- The Oklahoma Corporation Commission
- The Oklahoma Department of Commerce
- The Oklahoma Department of Environmental Quality
- The Oklahoma Department of Human Services
- The Oklahoma State Department of Health
- The Oklahoma Department of Transportation
- The Oklahoma Department of Agriculture, Food, and Forestry
- The Oklahoma Department of Wildlife Conservation
- The Oklahoma Historical Society
- The Oklahoma Insurance Commissioner
- The Association of County Commissioners of Oklahoma
- The Oklahoma Municipal League
- The Oklahoma State Fire Marshal
- The Oklahoma Department of Labor
- Depending on the circumstances, the Team Coordinator may request the participation of the head of any other state agencies as deemed appropriate.

The Team Coordinator may request that a representative of the United States Army Corps of Engineers be appointed by the administrative head of the Tulsa District to participate on the Team. The Team Coordinator may also request a representative of the United States Department of Housing and Urban Development be appointed by the administrative head of the Oklahoma City office to participate on the team.

== Local emergency management programs ==
All counties of the state are required to have a qualified emergency management director and all towns and cities are required to develop an emergency management program. A city or town may either have an emergency management director or create an agreement with their county for emergency management services. Regardless of level, the local emergency management director is responsible for the organization, administration, and operation of all such local organizations for emergency management within the director's territorial limits.

Each local emergency management organization must develop, maintain and revise, as necessary, a local emergency operations plan for the jurisdiction. Each plan shall address the emergency management system functions of preparedness, response, recovery and mitigation. Such plan must be based upon a hazard and risk assessment for the jurisdiction and include provisions for evacuation of all or a portion of the jurisdiction based upon such risk in the event any disaster necessitates the evacuation of its citizens.

Each Emergency Management Director is responsible for all aspects of emergency management in his or her jurisdiction. Such duties include conducting hazard analysis detailing risks and vulnerabilities; annually updating the existing all-hazard local Emergency Operations Plan (EOP); conducting and arranging for necessary training of all relevant personnel; conducting annual exercises to evaluate the plan; managing resources; determining shortfalls in equipment, personnel and training; revising the EOP as necessary; establishing and maintaining an office of emergency management; communication and warnings; conducting or supervising damage assessment and other pre- and post-disaster-related duties.

All local fire departments, law enforcement departments and other first response agencies must notify their respective local Emergency Management Director of all significant events occurring in the jurisdiction. Emergency Management Directors shall promptly report significant events to the Oklahoma Department of Emergency Management.

Each city, town, or county in which any disaster occurs has the authority to declare a local emergency. The city, town, or county must combat such disaster, protecting the health and safety of persons and property, and providing emergency assistance to the victims of such disaster. Each jurisdiction is authorized to exercise the emergency powers vested to it under the Emergency Management Act without regard to time-consuming procedures and formalities prescribed by law pertaining to the performance of public work, entering into contracts, the incurring of obligations, the employment of temporary workers, the rental of equipment, the purchase of supplies and materials, and the appropriation and expenditure of public funds. However, constitutional mandatory requirements must still be followed.

== See also ==
- Oklahoma Department of Emergency Management
- Governor of Oklahoma
- Catastrophic Health Emergency Powers Act
