= Oklahoma Governor's Mansion =

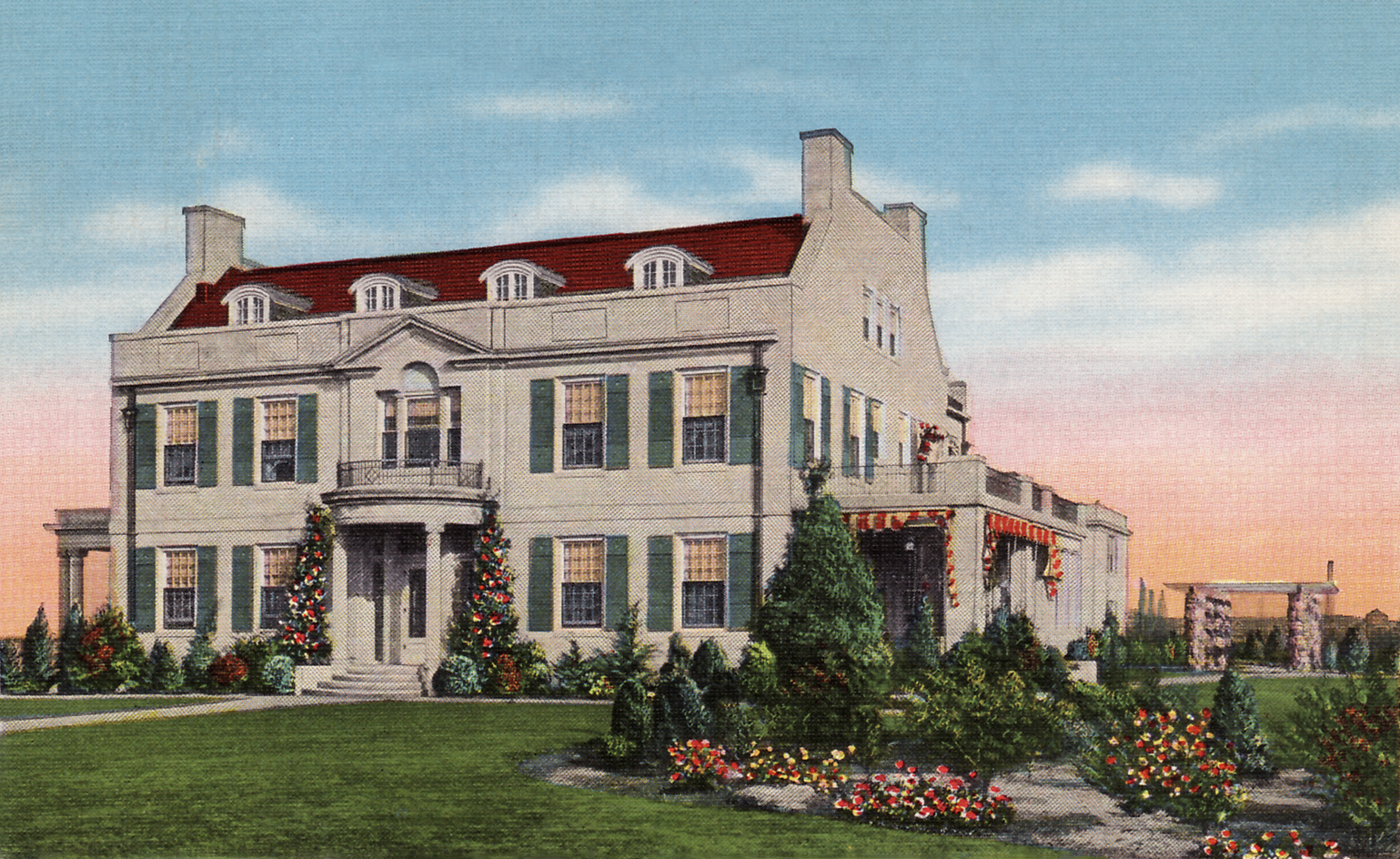
- Exterior of the mansion
- Interactive map of the Oklahoma Governor's Mansion area

General information
- Architectural style: Dutch-Colonial
- Location: Oklahoma City, Oklahoma, United States
- Coordinates: 35°29′33″N 97°29′50″W
- Current tenants: Kevin Stitt, governor of Oklahoma and family
- Construction started: 1927
- Completed: 1928
- Client: State of Oklahoma

Technical details
- Floor count: 3
- Floor area: 14000

Design and construction
- Architect: Layton, Hicks and Forsyth

Website
- https://www.ok.gov/governor/Mansion.html

The Oklahoma Governor's Mansion is the official residence of the governor of Oklahoma and is located at 820 NE 23rd Street in Oklahoma City, Oklahoma.

== Construction ==
After Oklahoma's admission to the Union on November 16, 1907, the Oklahoma Legislature was concerned mainly with establishing the Oklahoma State Capitol and not the Governor's residence. After the completion of the Capitol in 1919, the Legislature began to deliberate about a Governor's residence. The site for the Mansion had been selected in 1914: a plot of land just east of the Capitol.

The site would remain a grassy lot for more than a decade while the Legislature debated on funds for the Mansion. Not until 1927 did debate end. That year, Oklahoma prospered due to an oil boom, which increased tax funds that the State collected. The Legislature allocated $100,000 to the Mansion project. Of that $100,000, $75,000 was spent on the actual construction of the Mansion and the other $25,000 was used to provide the Governor with furniture. Two years later in 1929, the Legislature would spend another $39,000 on landscaping and other outdoor buildings on the Mansion's property.

The Mansion was completed in 1928, one year after construction began. Built by the Oklahoma City architectural company Layton, Hicks and Forsyth, the 14,000-square-foot (1,300 m^{2}) Mansion is of Dutch-Colonial style. Carthage limestone was used so the exterior of the Mansion would complement the Oklahoma State Capitol.

Over the years, the Mansion's 19 rooms on three floors have been reduced to 12 to increase living space. The rooms include a library, parlor, dining room, grand ballroom, kitchen, sun room and five bedrooms. The governor and family live in the five rooms on the second floor. All major furnishings of the floor were donated to the Governor by Oklahomans. However, as property of the state, they will remain with the Mansion for future Governors.

== History ==
Governor Henry S. Johnston was the first governor to live in the Mansion. However, due to his impeachment he lived there only three months. Governor William H. Murray was the first governor to reside a complete term in the mansion. Murray was Governor of Oklahoma when the Great Depression began. He brought a team of mules to the mansion in order to plow a large portion of the lawn, which he did himself, converting the grounds into a vegetable garden where the poor were invited to plant vegetables. There is a legend Murray's ghost still resides in the mansion, watching the governors. When Governor E. W. Marland took office in 1935, oil was discovered on the mansion property. The Legislature took advantage of the fact by placing an oil well on the mansion grounds, and it remained there during the 1930s and 1940s.

In the 1960s, a temporary heliport was added to the Mansion so that President Lyndon B. Johnson would have a place to land the President's helicopter. A concrete slab was poured quickly for the president's visit. Once President Johnson left, the slab was converted to a private tennis court. During the following decade, Oklahomans raised money for a private swimming pool in the shape of Oklahoma.

== The mansion today ==
In 1995, while Frank Keating was governor, the Governor's Mansion was renovated. Governor Keating asked ordinary Oklahomans to help with the remodeling and many responded. To help finance the project, the Friends of the Governors Mansion, Inc was established to raise funds.

Extensive structural work was done to keep the kitchen capable of preparing state dinners. However, the existing red and black granite countertops (from Granite, Oklahoma) installed in the early 1990s were preserved. The library's walnut paneling and moldings have been restored to both their original luster and the room's 1928 color-scheme of rich burgundy, gold and green. A Persian rug was added to the ballroom's original maple wood floor. The ballroom's windows, chandeliers and moldings were recreated to match to originals of 1928.

Tours of the mansion are available on Wednesday afternoons. The mansion is closed for tours during summers.

== See also ==
- Governor's Mansion (Shawnee, Oklahoma), listed on the National Register of Historic Places
