= Oklahoma Emergency Interim Executive and Judicial Succession Act =

Oklahoma State Legislature
- Full name: Emergency Interim Executive and Judicial Succession Act
- Signed into law: August 29, 2003
- Governor: Brad Henry
- Code: Title 63 (Public Health and Safety)
- Website: 63 O.S. Section 685.1

The Emergency Interim Executive and Judicial Succession Act (63 O.S. Sections 685.1 - 685.11) is an Oklahoma state law governing emergency succession to the all offices of the state and local governments, excluding the members of the Oklahoma Legislature, which are governed by the Oklahoma Emergency Management Interim Legislative Succession Act.

The Emergency Executive and Judicial Succession Act was signed into law by Governor Brad Henry on August 29, 2003. The act was part of a broader wave of emergency succession legislation passed by U.S. states following the September 11, 2001 attacks, which highlighted vulnerabilities in government continuity planning at all levels. The act complements the separately enacted Oklahoma Emergency Management Interim Legislative Succession Act, which governs succession for members of the Oklahoma Legislature.

== In General ==
All Emergency Interim Successors and Special Emergency Judges must take the same oath of office as the officers they are acting as. However, they do not need to fulfill any other prerequisite of office. All officials authorized to act as governor, Emergency Interim Successors and Special Emergency Judges may exercise their powers only after the declaration of a state of emergency. The Oklahoma Legislature, by concurrent resolution, may, at any time, terminate the authority of any Emergency Interim Successor or Special Emergency Judges to exercise their powers and discharge their duties.

Any dispute concerning a question of fact arising under the Emergency Succession Act with respect to an office in the executive branch of the state government (except a dispute relative to the Office of Governor) is determined by the governor and his decision is final. Any dispute with respect to the office of governor is determined by the Supreme Court.

== Succession to the Office of Governor ==
Under normal circumstance, in the event of a vacancy in the office Governor of Oklahoma, the Lieutenant Governor of Oklahoma would become the governor, as provided by the Oklahoma Constitution. The Constitution also provides that if the lieutenant governor is unable to become governor, then the duty falls to the President pro tempore of the Oklahoma Senate and then to the Speaker of the Oklahoma House of Representatives.

However, during a state of emergency, should the governor be unable to exercise his powers or the governorship is vacant and the lieutenant governor, president pro tempore, and Speaker of the House are unable to act as governor or succeed to the governorship, it is the duty of the Emergency Interim Successor to the Governor to exercise the powers of the governor until the governor returns, a higher officer can act as governor, or until new governor is elected. Such successor only acts as governor, however, and such successor may not succeed to the governorship.

The order of Emergency Interim Successor to the Governorship is as follows:

- the Oklahoma State Auditor and Inspector
- the Attorney General of Oklahoma
- the State Treasurer of Oklahoma
- the Oklahoma Superintendent of Public Instruction
- the Oklahoma Commissioner of Labor
- the members of the Oklahoma Corporation Commission (in the order of their election)

== Succession to other state offices and local officers ==
All state officers (e.g. the Attorney General, State Treasurer, etc.), other than the governor, and local officers (e.g. Mayor, County Commissioner, etc.) must designate an Emergency Interim Successor to exercise their powers in their absence. Such designation are subject to the such regulations as the governor may determine. The state or local officer must designate no less than three but no more than seven successors. Such list of successors may be amended as necessary by the state officer.

In the event that any state or local officer is unavailable following a state of emergency, and in the event a deputy (if any) is also unavailable, the powers of the office are exercised the designated Emergency Interim Successors in the order specified by the state officer. The authority of a Successor ceases:

- when the incumbent state or local officer, or a deputy or an interim successor higher in designation becomes available to exercise the powers and to perform the duties of the office
- when a successor to the office has been duly elected or appointed according to law.

== Special Emergency Judges ==
In the event that a state of emergency occurs and if any judge of any court in the Oklahoma Court System is unavailable to exercise the powers of their office, and no other judge is authorized to act or no special judge is appointed to act, the duties of the office are discharged by a Special Emergency Judge.

The governor designates Special Emergency Judges for each Justice of the Oklahoma Supreme Court and for each Judge of the Oklahoma Court of Criminal Appeals. The Chief Justice of the Supreme Court, in consultation with the other members of the Court, designates all Special Emergency Judges for each District Judge and each court of record in the state. Each District Judge, in consultation with the other District Judges, designates all Special Emergency Judges for the courts of no records within their district.

All Special Emergency Judges, regardless of how appointed, shall discharge their duties and exercise their powers until such time as a vacancy which may exist shall be filled in accordance with the law or until the regular judge becomes available to exercise their powers and discharge their duties of the office.

== See also ==
- Governor of Oklahoma
- Oklahoma Emergency Management Act of 2003
- Catastrophic Health Emergency Powers Act
- Oklahoma Emergency Management Interim Legislative Succession Act
