= Solem v. Bartlett =

- Supreme Court of the United States

Argued December 6, 1983 Decided February 22, 1984
- Full case name: Solem v. Bartlett
- Citations: 465 U.S. 463 (more) 104 S. Ct. 1161, 79 L. Ed. 2d 443, 1984 U.S. LEXIS 34
- Argument: Oral argument

Case history
- Prior: 691 F.2d 420 (8th Cir. 1982); cert. granted, 461 U.S. 956 (1983).
- Subsequent: Rehearing denied, 466 U.S. 948 (1984).

Holding
- Surplus Land Acts do not diminish reservations unless the act and its legislative history provide sufficient evidence of the intent to diminish.

Court membership
- Chief Justice Warren E. Burger Associate Justices William J. Brennan Jr. · Byron White; Thurgood Marshall · Harry Blackmun; Lewis F. Powell Jr. · William Rehnquist; John P. Stevens · Sandra Day O'Connor

Case opinion
- Majority: Marshall, joined unanimously

Solem v. Bartlett, 465 U.S. 463 (1984), was a United States Supreme Court case involving Indian country jurisdiction in the United States that decided that opening up reservation lands for settlement by non-Indians does not constitute the intent to diminish reservation boundaries. Therefore, reservation boundaries would not be diminished unless specifically determined through acts of Congress.

== Background ==
The Cheyenne River Sioux Reservation was one of five created by the 1889 partitioning of the Great Sioux Reservation, with its agency in the city of Eagle Butte, South Dakota.

The Cheyenne River Act of 1908 gave the Secretary of Interior power “to sell and dispose of” 1,600,000 acres (6,500 km^{2}) of the Cheyenne River Sioux reservation to non-Indians for settlement. The profit of the sale was to go to the United States Treasury as a “credit” for the Indians to have tribal rights on the reservation (465 U.S. 463).

In 1979, Sioux tribe member John Bartlett was charged by the State of South Dakota with attempted rape. The crime had occurred on the area of the reservation that had been opened to settlement in 1908 with Cheyenne River Act (465 U. S. 465). Bartlett pleaded guilty and was sentenced to ten years in a state penitentiary, but contended that his crime actually took place in Indian country because the Act did not reduce the reservation but instead only opened it to settlement, therefore the jurisdiction belonged to the tribe, not the state (465 U.S. 465).

== Precedents ==
While Solem is the first case to lay out a definitive framework for defining reservation diminishment, it was not the first time The Court had to deal with such an issue. Seymour v. Superintendent of Washington State Penitentiary was an early case to use direct plain-language analysis of previous acts relating to Indian land rights. The 1962 case unanimously found that a previous 1906 land act did not diminish the Colville reservation since it only discussed a procedure for the contended land’s settlement, not a direct transference of land ownership.

Later cases concerned with Native land used more than just original text, though. 1973’s Mattz v. Arnett included regional legislative history and population demographics in finding the Klamath Reservation still intact, even noting that the Indian population of the region was likely underestimated to attract settlers during the land rush. DeCoteau v. District County Court, a 1975 case that officially diminished the Lake Traverse Indian Reservation, “pointed to newspaper coverage, Bureau of Indian Affairs documents, and the state of the tribe at the time of the 1889 negotiations … to support its conclusion of consent”. One of the last pre-Solem reservation cases was Rosebud Sioux Tribe v. Kneip, during which The Court consulted an unpassed 1901 land act and a 1904 presidential proclamation alongside modern demographics of the contested area while finding congressional intent to diminish.

== Opinion of the Court ==
The Court recognized that large areas in the west had been set aside as Indian reservations in the late 19th century, and that later, individual allotments were designated to Indians, with the excess land being sold to non-Indians. The Cheyenne River Act was a piece of legislation that dealt specifically with the excess land from the Cheyenne Sioux Reservation, and has its own statutory language. Usually, States held jurisdiction over unallotted open lands when the Act declared that the area is no longer considered reservation land. Otherwise, federal, state, and tribal authorities share jurisdiction of the open area. The Court stated that designated reservation land remains a part of the reservation until Congress clearly diminishes its boundaries.

The Court held that the Act only gives the Secretary of State permission to “sell and dispose” of lands, not to diminish the reservation boundaries (465 U.S. 466). Therefore, the Cheyenne River Sioux reservation was not diminished by the Act and the area on which Bartlett committed his crime was within Indian country jurisdiction.

The ruling in Solem v. Bartlett established three principles to measure Congress’s intent to diminish a reservation.

First, only Congress has the power to diminish reservation boundaries. In Solem, it is stated that “once a block of land is set aside for an Indian reservation and no matter what happens to the title of the individual plots within the area, the entire block retains its reservation status until Congress explicitly states otherwise”. Therefore, the allotment policy does not designate a change in reservation boundaries.

It is also stated that the intent to diminish will not be lightly inferred by a federal court. Since only Congress has the power to diminish a reservation and the allotment policy never eliminated reservations, the language of any surplus land acts must specifically state the intent to diminish a reservation or make a blatant statement from which the intent to diminished is presumed.

Other factors can also determine whether reservation lands have been reduced by an act, such as the legislative history. For example, subsequent treatment of the land by Congress can specify whether the land is still considered a part of the reservation or not. If the treatment of an area strongly suggests that Congress or other governmental groups view the reservation land as diminished, yet there is no specific statutory language deeming it so, it can still be considered reduced. However, when both the Act and the legislative history are unsuccessful in providing proof that supports the idea of diminishment, the court holds that the reservation is not diminished

== Subsequent developments ==
The important precedents set in the decision, Solem v. Bartlett, were heavily relied upon later on to decide two other cases involving Indian country jurisdiction. In Hagen v. Utah, the court, using the factors determined in Solem, upheld that Congress had intentionally diminished tribal lands with surplus land acts in the Uintah Reservation. The court determined that the specific language in Hagen, which addressed that the excess lands “be restored to the public domain” clearly indicated that the land was not to remain reservation land as in Solem, but instead reduce the boundaries of the reservation. The court also used demographic evidence to make their decision, deciding that the muted Indian presence in the area’s largest city counted as a “practical acknowledgement that the Reservation was diminished”. Justice Harry Blackmun, who had been a part of Solem’s unanimous decision, dissented in Hagen due to his belief that ambiguous cases should always be decided in favor of the tribe. In another similar case, South Dakota v. Yankton Sioux Tribe, the court echoed similar sentiments, stating that Congress used clear statutory language to diminish the boundaries of the Yankton Sioux Reservation and that the agreement to pay for these lands further supported that they had been ceded through the statute. Demographic evidence was considered – the proportion of the disputed land’s population which was Indian sat at almost 1/3 and rising – but the court ultimately decided that plain-language evidence outweighed it.

The tests of Solem as to whether Congress has property disestablished the reservation boundary, arose in Sharp v. Murphy, a case involving the reservations of the Five Civilized Tribes that cover most of the eastern half of the state of Oklahoma, as to whether to determine if a person accused of murder should be under jurisdiction of the state if the reservations were disestablished or the federal system otherwise. Oklahoma’s lawyer Lisa Blatt said of the contested land “Every piece of paper, record, book, dollar bill or coin or property, their buildings, their furniture, their desks—everything was taken away from the tribes”, pointing towards the Solem decision’s non-linguistic factors for diminishing a reservation, but The United States Court of Appeals for the Tenth Circuit ultimately used Solem to find that Congress did not explicitly disestablish these reservations. The decision of the Appeals Court was upheld by the United States Supreme in light of that courts judgement in McGirt v. Oklahoma (2020). This means that Patrick Murphy could be retried in federal court.

== Importance and continued debate ==
The ultimate goal of allotment policy and reservation land opening was to assimilate the Tribes into the larger American society. The Court itself, in their decision on County of Yakima v. Confederated Tribes and Bands of Yakima Indian Nation noted that the goals of the Dawes Act and similar allotment acts “were simple and clear cut: to extinguish tribal sovereignty, erase reservation boundaries, and force the assimilation of Indians into the society at large.” Solem, occurring after the late 1960s governmental shift away from Indian Termination Policy, was a major milestone in the road to self-governance.

In the years and decisions since Solem, much has been made about the use of demographic evidence. The original decision endorsed its use reluctantly as a second line of reasoning only when plain language has failed to find congressional intent in previous allotment acts, but cases like Sharp v. Murphy show how states like Oklahoma, protective of their land, use demographic evidence as the crux of their argument. Some historians have noted that using demographic evidence goes against the Indian Canons of Construction laid out in Worcester v. Georgia since they are often used in ambiguous situations, ones which the Worcester Court believed should be decided in favor of Indians.
