= Cleveland County Sheriff's Office (Oklahoma) =

- Abbreviation: CCSO
- Motto: Courageously Protect and Compassionately Serve

Agency overview
- Formed: 1889
- Employees: 194
- Annual budget: Approx 14 Million Annually

Jurisdictional structure
- Operations jurisdiction: Cleveland, Oklahoma, USA
- Map of Cleveland County Sheriff's Office's jurisdiction
- Area: 558 square miles (1,450 km^{2})
- Population: 279,641(2017 est.)
- General nature: Local civilian police

Operational structure
- Headquarters: Norman, Oklahoma
- Sworn members: 75
- Unsworn members: 119
- Agency executive: Chris Amason, Sheriff

Website
- ccso-ok.us

Cleveland County Sheriff's Office is the chief law enforcement agency in Cleveland County, Oklahoma, with primary jurisdiction in the unincorporated areas of the county. Consisting of over 194 employees including deputies, detention staff and support personnel, the Office serves a population of over 275,000 people. The office is headed by Sheriff Chris Amason, a Republican, elected and taking office in November 2020.

== Controversies ==
- An audit revealed that the department had bartered with vendors using confiscated weapons.
- $85,000 in firearms, radios and police vests went unaccounted for in 2017
- At times they have driven almost 50 vehicles without purchasing insurance.
- They have used county money to house Department of Corrections inmates and failed to bill the DOC almost a quarter million dollars.

== Fallen Deputies ==
Since the establishment of the Cleveland County Sheriff's Office, two deputies have died in the line of duty.

Deputy	Date of death	Details
Undersheriff William H. Abbott	Saturday, February 17, 1912	Gunfire
Undersheriff Grover Fulkerson	Friday, August 24, 1917	Gunfire

== See also ==
- List of law enforcement agencies in Oklahoma
