= Muskogee County Sheriff's Office =

- Abbreviation: MCSO

Agency overview
- Formed: 1907

Jurisdictional structure
- Operations jurisdiction: Muskogee, Oklahoma, USA
- Map of Muskogee County Sheriff's Office's jurisdiction
- Area: 829 square miles (2,150 km^{2})
- Population: 69,451 (2008 est.)
- General nature: Local civilian police

Operational structure
- Headquarters: Muskogee, Oklahoma

Muskogee County Sheriff's Office is the chief law enforcement agency in Muskogee County, Oklahoma, with primary jurisdiction in the unincorporated areas of the county. Consisting of sheriff's deputies, detention staff and support personnel, the department serves a population of over 70,000 people.

== Incidents ==
=== Civil Forfeiture ===
On February 27, 2016, Muskogee County sheriff's deputies pulled over Eh Wah on U.S. Route 69 due to a broken tail light. Eh Wah, a naturalized U.S. citizen, was carrying cash proceeds from a fundraiser for a Christian band. However, miscommunication during questioning raised suspicions among the officers. Deputies brought out a drug-sniffing dog that gave a positive alert, but did not find any drugs during the search that followed. The deputies instead found and seized $53,249 in cash, citing the "possession of drug proceeds"; the money however was going towards a Christian liberal arts college and an orphanage in Thailand. Although Eh Wah was not immediately charged at the scene, a warrant for his arrest was issued on April 5 for acquiring "proceeds from drug activity," citing the alert from the drug-sniffing dog, "inconsistent stories," and the inability to "confirm the money was his" as probable cause. Following national coverage of the incident in the Washington Post, the charges were dropped and the district attorney stated that a check would be issued to refund the full amount confiscated.

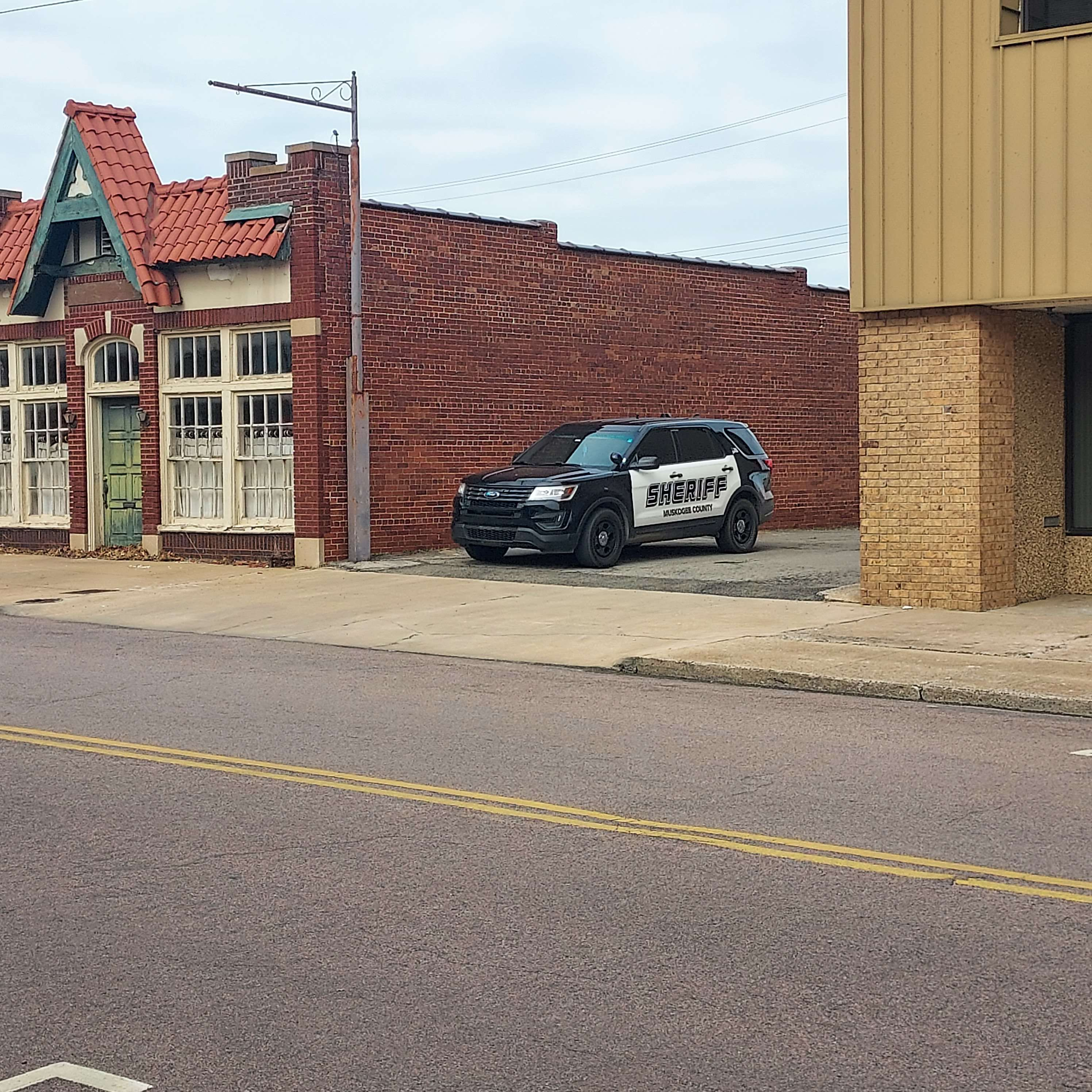
A parked Muskogee County Sheriff Vehicle

== Fallen Deputies ==
Since the establishment of the Muskogee County Sheriff's Office, two deputies have died in the line of duty.

Deputy	Date of death	Details
Deputy Sheriff James Work	Thursday, May 4, 1911	Gunfire
Deputy Sheriff Henry B. Crane	Wednesday, June 17, 1914	Gunfire
Deputy Sheriff Homer Teaff	Tuesday, June 27, 1922	Gunfire
Deputy Sheriff Joseph P. Morgan	Monday, June 16, 1924	Gunfire
Deputy Sheriff Webster Reece	Saturday, September 17, 1932	Gunfire
Special Deputy Sheriff Andrew McGinnis	Sunday, September 18, 1932	Gunfire

== See also ==
- List of law enforcement agencies in Oklahoma
