= Sequoyah County Sheriff's Office (Oklahoma) =

Law enforcement agency in Oklahoma, US

Jurisdictional structure
- Operations jurisdiction: Sequoyah, Oklahoma, USA
- Map of Sequoyah County Sheriff's Office's jurisdiction
- General nature: Local civilian police

Operational structure
- Agency executive: Larry Lane (2016–), Sheriff

Website
- www.scsok.org

Sequoyah County Sheriff's Office is the chief law enforcement agency that serves a population of over 42,391 people in Sequoyah County, Oklahoma. As of 2022 the sheriff is Larry Lane, the undersheriff is Greg Cox, and the chief deputy is Charles House.

== History ==
On August 27, 1926, Deputy Sheriff Perry Chuculate was shot and killed while searching for a stolen vehicle. He and another deputy stopped a speeding car. The car was occupied by a gang bank robbers, led by two brothers, who had just committed a robbery. As the deputies approached the car the occupants exited and opened fire with rifles. The gang was led by the Kimes brothers who were convicted of manslaughter in connection with Deputy Chuculate's murder and sentenced to 25 years in prison. One of the brothers, Matthew Kimes, escaped from prison and continued his crime spree. During the following year, the escaped brother continued robbing banks with the Cotton Top Walker Gang, which was responsible for the murders of Borger, Texas, Police Patrolman Coke Buchanan, on March 19, 1927; Hutchinson County, Texas, Sheriff's Deputies D. P. Kenyon and Almer Terry, on April 1, 1927; and Beggs, Oklahoma, Police Chief W. J. McAnnally, on May 18, 1927. Matthew Kimes was finally arrested in Flagstaff, Arizona, on June 23, 1927.

In 2007, the sheriff's department became the first in the state to arrest illegal immigrants under the Oklahoma Taxpayer and Citizen Protection Act of 2007. Sheriff Johnny Philpot later stated that housing the immigrants was a financial burden on the county.

In 2009, the county jail was put back into the sheriffs department. The jail was previously managed by the Sequoyah County Criminal Justice Authority.

== See also ==
- List of law enforcement agencies in Oklahoma
- Sequoyah County, Oklahoma
