= Office of the Oklahoma State Fire Marshal =

Agency overview
- Formed: July 1, 1965
- Headquarters: Oklahoma City, Oklahoma
- Employees: 23 FTE (2012)
- Annual budget: $ 2.5 million (2012)
- Minister responsible: Michael C. Thompson, Secretary of Safety and Security
- Agency executives: G. Keith Bryant, State Fire Marshal; James Fullingim, Assistant State Fire Marshal
- Parent agency: Oklahoma State Fire Marshal Commission
- Website: Office of the State Fire Marshal

The Office of the Oklahoma State Fire Marshal (OSFM) is an agency of the government of Oklahoma responsible for preventing and investigating loss of life and destruction of property caused by fire. OSFM accomplishes its mission through public education, criminal investigations, building inspections, and fire code enforcement activities.

OSFM is headed by State Fire Marshal. The State Fire Marshal is responsible for preventing and investigating fires. The State Fire Marshal is appointed by the State Fire Marshal Commission, a seven-member board appointed by the Governor of Oklahoma with the approval of the Oklahoma Senate. The current State Fire Marshal is G. Keith Bryant.

The Office of the State Fire Marshal was created in 1965 during the term of Governor Henry Bellmon.

== State Fire Marshal Commission ==
The State Fire Marshal Commission is a seven-member commission that supervises the operations of the State Fire Marshal and provides such policy and regulation of the State Fire Marshal as is needed. Commission members are appointed by the Governor of Oklahoma, with the consent of the Oklahoma Senate, and serve staggered five-year terms. Commissioners represent Safety Engineers, State Fire Firefighters, Oklahoma Municipalities, Oklahoma Fire Chiefs, Professional Firefighters, and Oklahoma Electricians.

Name	Group Represented	Term Expires	Commission Office
Diane Abernathy	Safety Engineers	2012	
Kirk Trekell	Cities and Towns	2013	
Joe Elam	Career Firefighters	2013	
Mark Huff	Volunteer Firefighters	2014	
Paul Gallahar	Governor of Oklahoma	2015	Chairman
Keith Bryant	Fire Chiefs	2016	
Cecil Clay	Electrical Workers	2017	

== Appointment and qualifications ==
The Commission appoints the State Fire Marshal by a majority vote based solely on administrative ability and experience. Any potential appointee must be a person of good moral character, a resident of Oklahoma at the time of appointment, possess or obtain a valid Oklahoma driver license and be a citizen of the United States. The State Fire Marshal must have a minimum of ten years' experience in fire protection, fire prevention, investigation, or criminal justice. The Commission may also require such additional qualifications as it deems needed.

If the Commission so deems, the State Fire Marshal may be required to obtain certification as a peace officer from the Council on Law Enforcement Education and Training, and will be subject to an extensive background investigation, psychological testing, and drug testing.

== Duties and powers ==
The Office of the State Fire Marshal is responsible for enforcing the State Fire Code. OSFM's law enforcement agents investigate crimes of arson statewide in conjunction with city and county law enforcement officials. In conjunction with the Oklahoma Department of Mines and the Oklahoma Department of Public Safety, it is the duty of OSFM to enforce all state laws governing the transportation, storage, and use of explosive devices.

To ensure compliance with the State Fire and Building Codes, OSFM requires a permit be obtained from its office prior to the construction of many types of buildings anywhere in the state. OSFM examines plans and specifications of certain types of new construction or remodeling to ensure minimum safety standards are met. Many cities across the state, however, have adopted the State's fire and building codes. In such cases, OSFM approval is granted upon inspection by the local officials and the issuance of a local building permit. Those cities which have not adopted the State codes fall under the jurisdiction of OSFM and must obtain a building permit from it prior to the beginning of construction. In all cases, OSFM is authorized to provide technical assistance assist any city, town or county in the enforcement of the fire and building codes.

OSFM compiles and documents every fire in the state by receiving annual incident reports from all fire departments in the state as required by law. This information is collected under the Oklahoma Fire Incident Reporting System (OFIRS) as directed by the State Fire Marshal Commission and reported to the National Fire Incident Reporting System. OFIRS is used to gather and analyze information on the state's fire problem, as well as its detailed characteristics and trends.

At least once a year, OSFM is required to inspect for minimum safety standards all correctional institutions operated or licensed by both the Oklahoma Department of Corrections and the Oklahoma Office of Juvenile Affairs.

OSFM serves as staff to the Oklahoma Council on Firefighter Training.

== Divisions ==
- Administration Division
- Fire Investigations Division
  - Arson Investigations
  - Oklahoma Fire Investigation Reporting System
- Fire Protection and Prevention Division
  - Building Permits
  - Code Enforcement and Inspections

== Finance and Staff ==
The Office of the State Fire Marshal was authorized a budget of $2.5 million for State fiscal year 2012. The Oklahoma Legislature authorized the agency to employ 23 FTE positions for that period.

== See also ==
- Fire marshal
- Firefighter
