= 2012 Oklahoma state budget =

2012 Budget of the Oklahoma state government
- Submitted: February 7, 2011
- Submitted by: Mary Fallin
- Submitted to: 52nd Legislature
- Country: Oklahoma
- Total revenue: $6.5 billion (estimated)
- Total expenditures: $6.6 billion (requested) $6.5 billion (enacted)
- Debt payment: $178 million
- Website: http://www.ok.gov/osf/Budget/index.html Oklahoma Office of State Finance

The Oklahoma State Budget for Fiscal Year 2012, is a spending request by Governor Mary Fallin to fund government operations for July 1, 2011–June 30, 2012. Governor Fallin proposed the budget on February 7, 2011. This was Governor Fallin's first budget submitted as governor.

Figures shown in the spending request do not reflect the actual appropriations for Fiscal Year 2012, which must be authorized by the Legislature.

== Overview ==
The budget crisis of the 2011 Oklahoma state budget caused the Oklahoma State Treasurer's Office to estimate that the 2012 budget would see a $600 million budget shortfall. Following the December 2010 meeting of the Oklahoma State Board of Equalization, the Board certified that the 2012 budget would see a shortfall of $400 million from 2011 levels.

Governor of Oklahoma Mary Fallin's proposed budget relies upon a combination of agency budget reductions, increased tax enforcement, agency consolidations, and government modernization to overcome the budget shortfall. Most agencies are budgeted to receive a 5% across the board cuts, but public safety, healthcare, and education will see smaller cuts of only 3%. If the governor's budget plan is realized, the $400 million deficit will result in a $100 million surplus.

== Major Issues ==
=== Cost Savings ===
- Government Modernization
  - $6.1 million saving - Financial and payroll services consolidation
  - $192 million saving - Information technology reduction
  - $3.6 million saving - Electronic payments instead of paper checks
  - Monies defrauded from tax refund eligible citizens enabled by FBR's exceeding authority through 12 CFR 205 Supp 1 contrary to 15 USC 1639
  - $69.6 million saving - Agency hiring freeze
  - $1.7 million saving - Purchasing cards for higher education institution
- Agency Consolidations
  - Construction Industries Board into Oklahoma Department of Labor
  - Human Rights Commission to Office of the Attorney General
  - Oklahoma Merit Protection Commission to Oklahoma Office of Personnel Management
  - Scenic Rivers Commission to Oklahoma Conservation Commission
  - Oklahoma Center for the Advancement of Science and Technology to Oklahoma Department of Commerce
  - Oklahoma Alcoholic Beverage Law Enforcement Commission to Oklahoma Tax Commission and Oklahoma Bureau of Narcotics and Dangerous Drugs Control
  - Oklahoma Department of Environmental Quality and Oklahoma Department of Mines in new Department of Natural Resources
  - Consolidate state employee benefits management into new Oklahoma Health and Wellness Board
  - Reappropriate Oklahoma Space Industry Development Authority
  - Restructure Oklahoma Council on Judicial Complaints into non-appropriated agency
  - Restructure Oklahoma Secretary of State into non-appropriated agency
- Tax Compliance and Enforcement
  - $104.9 million revenue - two year registration system for non-commercial vehicles
  - $3.5 million revenue - ten new tax enforcement agents for Oklahoma Tax Commission
  - $5 million revenue - move point of taxation on beer from retail to wholesale level
  - $4 million revenue - two new income tax auditors for Oklahoma Tax Commission

=== Key Funding Issues ===
- $2 million to Oklahoma Department of Mental Health and Substance Abuse Services to prevent the incarceration of women through substance abuse treatment
- $1 million to Oklahoma Department of Mental Health and Substance Abuse Services for Mental Health Emergency Responders program in Oklahoma County
- $1 million saving by closing F-Unit at the Oklahoma State Penitentiary
- $2 million for state match for Substance Abuse and Mental Health Services Administration Systems of Care grant
- $2.8 million to Oklahoma State Department of Education for upgrading student information system

== Total Revenue ==
All revenue for the $6.4 billion budget estimate breaks down as follows:

- $6.1 billion - All taxes
- $105 million - Fee increases
- $102 million - American Recovery and Reinvestment Act Medicaid Funds
- $100 million - Oklahoma Department of Transportation bond
- $12.5 million - Tax enforcement
- $6.5 million - Other revenue measures

== Total Spending ==
=== Requested ===
The Governor's budget for 2012 totals $6.6 billion in spending. Percentages in parentheses indicate percentage change compared to FY2011 revised budget base (FY2011 appropriations excluding one-time appropriations). The budget request is broken down by the following expenditures:

- Appropriations by Cabinet Department: $6.6 billion (-1%)
  - $3.4 billion - Education (-2%)
  - $1.2 billion - Health (-3%)
  - $701 million - Human Services (-3%)
  - $629 million - Safety and Security (-4%)
  - $208 million - Transportation (+81%)
  - $85.8 million - Finance and Revenue (-1%)
  - $78.4 million - Judiciary (-3%)
  - $73.6 million - Commerce and Tourism (-7%)
  - $34.9 million - Veterans Affairs (-3%)
  - $34.3 million - Agriculture (-5%)
  - $30.4 million - Legislature (-5%)
  - $22.3 million - Human Resources and Administration (-3%)
  - $18.2 million - Science and Technology (-5%)
  - $13.1 million - Environment (-5%)
  - $10.5 million - Military (-3%)
  - $9.8 million - Energy (-10%)
  - $8.2 million - Secretary of State (-10%)
  - $2.5 million - Governor and Lieutenant Governor (-4%)

=== Enacted ===
The Oklahoma Legislature approved total appropriations for fiscal year 2012 of $6.5 billion. Percentages in parentheses indicate percentage change compared to the Governor's budget. The final appropriations are broken down by the following expenditures:

- Appropriations by Cabinet Department: 6.5 billion (-1%)
  - $3.4 billion - Education (-1%)
  - $1.2 billion - Health (+3%)
  - $713 million - Human Services (+2%)
  - $639 million - Safety and Security (+2%)
  - $107 million - Transportation (-49%)
  - $83.4 million - Finance and Revenue (-3%)
  - $84.4 million - Judiciary (+8%)
  - $79.7 million - Commerce and Tourism (+8%)
  - $35.2 million - Agriculture (+3%)
  - $34.7 million - Veterans Affairs (-1%)
  - $31.9 million - Legislature (+5%)
  - $24.9 million - Human Resources and Administration (+12%)
  - $17.8 million - Science and Technology (-2%)
  - $13.1 million - Environment (+0%)
  - $12.1 million - Energy (+23%)
  - $10.2 million - Military (-3%)
  - $8.3 million - Secretary of State (+1%)
  - $2.4 million - Governor and Lieutenant Governor (-4%)
