= Oklahoma Alcoholic Beverage Laws Enforcement Commission =

Alcoholic Beverage Laws Enforcement Commission
- Abbreviation: ABLE

Agency overview
- Formed: September 18, 1984
- Employees: 42 classified 2 unclassified
- Annual budget: $1.7 million

Jurisdictional structure
- Operations jurisdiction: Oklahoma, USA
- Map of Alcoholic Beverage Laws Enforcement Commission's jurisdiction
- Area: 69,898 square miles (181,030 km^{2})
- Population: 3,617,316 (2007 est.)
- General nature: Civilian police

Operational structure
- Headquarters: 50 NE 23rd Street, Oklahoma City, Oklahoma
- Agency executives: Michael Thompson, Cabinet Secretary of Safety and Security; Bryan Close, Chairman of the Commission; A. Keith Burt, Director and Secretary to the Commission; Jim Hughes, Assistant Director

Website
- Official site

The Alcoholic Beverage Laws Enforcement Commission, often referred to as the ABLE Commission, is an agency of the state of Oklahoma. The ABLE Commission is charged with protecting the public welfare and interest through the enforcement of state laws pertaining to alcoholic beverages, charity games, and youth access to tobacco.

== Divisions ==
- Administrative Services Division - 6 Full Time Equivalent (FTE) employees.
- Business Office Division - 13 FTE employees.
- Enforcement Division - 25 FTE employees.
  - The Enforcement Division is divided into 3 district offices and 3 specialty sections which help facilitate the agency's duties throughout the state.
    - Oklahoma City District Office
    - Tulsa District Office
    - McAlester District Office
    - Wholesalers - OKC
    - Special Events / Public Information - OKC
    - Education and Compliance - OKC

== Rank structure ==
Title	Description	Comparative OHP rank
Director	Appointed by ABLE Commission to be the professional head of the ABLE Commission.	OHP Colonel
Deputy Director	Appointed by ABLE Director to serve as second-in-command of the ABLE Commission.	OHP Lt. Colonel
Division Director	Responsible for directing a Division of the ABLE Commission.	OHP Major
Agent in Charge	Responsible for directed investigations of a Regional Office or Specialized Unit	OHP Captain
Assistant Agent in Charge	Responsible for assisting in the directed investigations of a Regional Office or Specialized Unit	OHP Lieutenant
Senior Agent	Responsible for leading investigations and assisting lower level agents in the performance of their duties	OHP Sergeant
Special Agent	Responsible for field investigative operations or specialized or technical law enforcement function	OHP Trooper

== Fallen officers ==
Since the establishment of the Oklahoma Alcoholic Beverage Laws Enforcement Commission, two officers have died while on duty.

== See also ==
- List of law enforcement agencies in Oklahoma
