= Catastrophic Health Emergency Powers Act =

State law of Oklahoma, United States

Oklahoma State Legislature
- House voted: May 28, 2003 (70-25)
- Senate voted: May 29, 2003 (26-18)
- Signed into law: July 7, 2003; 21 years ago
- Governor: Brad Henry
- Code: Title 63 (Oklahoma Public Health Code)
- Bill: H.B. 1467

Status: Current legislation

The Catastrophic Health Emergency Powers Act (63 O.S. § 6101-6804), often referred to as the Health Emergency Act, is an Oklahoma state law that details the response to a catastrophic health emergency in Oklahoma created as a result of a nuclear weapon, bioterrorism, a chemical weapon or other biological toxin. The Health Emergency Act along with the Oklahoma Emergency Management Act of 2003 form the primary state laws regarding emergency management.

The Health Emergency Act was signed into law by Governor Brad Henry on June 7, 2003.

== In General ==
In the early 21st century, events such as the 2001 anthrax attacks garnered attention of government officials across the nation. The Health Emergency Act grants state and local officials the authority to provide care, treatment, and vaccination to persons who are ill or who have been exposed to transmissible diseases during a catastrophic health emergency as well as the authority to separate affected individuals from the population at large to interrupt disease transmission. The Act provides for ensuring the needs of infected or exposed persons are properly addressed to the fullest extent possible, given the primary goal of controlling serious health threats and allows state and local officials the ability to prevent, detect, manage, and contain health threats without unduly interfering with civil rights and liberties.

=== Health Emergency Task Force ===
The Health Emergency Act created the Oklahoma Catastrophic Health Emergency Planning Task Force for the purpose of preparing a plan for responding to a catastrophic health emergency in the state. Such plan must be annually updated by the Task Force.

The Task Force consists of the following seventeen members:

- The Cabinet Secretary of Health, who serves as chair
- The State Commissioner of Health
- The Commissioner of Public Safety
- The Oklahoma Attorney General
- The Administrative Director of the Courts;
- The Director of Emergency Management
- Two members of the Oklahoma Senate appointed by the President pro tempore of the Oklahoma Senate
- Two members of the Oklahoma House of Representatives appointed by the Speaker of the Oklahoma House of Representatives
- The Director of the Tulsa City-County Health Department
- The Director of the Oklahoma City-County Health Department
- The Oklahoma State Fire Marshal
- A representative of the Oklahoma State Board of Medical Licensure and Supervision to be appointed by the State Board of Medical Licensure and Supervision;
- A representative of the State Board of Osteopathic Examiners to be appointed by the State Board of Osteopathic Examiners;
- A representative of the Governor of Oklahoma to be appointed by the Governor;
- A person appointed by the Governor representing a statewide organization representing hospitals;
- A representative of the Oklahoma Nurses Association to be appointed by the Oklahoma Nurses Association; and
- A representative of the Oklahoma Psychological Association to be appointed by the Oklahoma Psychological Association.

== Gubernatorial emergency powers ==
After consulting the Commissioner of Health, the Governor of Oklahoma may declare a state of catastrophic health emergency. By declaring such an emergency, the Governor automatically convenes the Oklahoma Legislature into special session. During a state of catastrophic health emergency, the Governor may utilize all available resources of the state government and its political subdivisions to respond to the catastrophic health emergency and may mobilize all or any part of the Oklahoma National Guard into service of the state.

The Commissioner of Health, under the direction of the Governor, has primary jurisdiction for planning and executing disaster mitigation, response, and recovery for the state. At any time, the Commissioner of Health may request assistance from Commissioner of Public Safety in enforcing his order regarding response, and the Commissioner of Public Safety may in turn request the assistance of the National Guard in enforcing the Commissioner of Health's orders.

== COVID-19 Response ==
Governor Kevin Stitt invoked powers under the Catastrophic Health Emergency Powers Act, to enable a coordinated response to the COVID-19 pandemic. The first confirmed case of COVID-19 occurred in Oklahoma on March 7, 2020.

Among a series of COVID-19 related executive orders and initiatives continuing through 2020, many related to hospital case reporting, mobilization of state resources and placing limitations on in-person gatherings to slow person-to-person spread of the virus. The usage of the emergency powers under the Act became the first time it had been invoked since enactment.
