= Oklahoma Sheriffs' Association =

The Oklahoma Sheriffs' Association (OSA) is a non-profit professional association of the 77 elected County Sheriffs in Oklahoma. OSA represents the sheriffs to state officials and works to coordinate policies between the sheriffs through training and education and by providing technical and informational support.

== Objectives ==
According to the OSA website, the objectives of the OSA are:

- Provide training and education information in the fields of law enforcement, crime prevention and detection, jail management, public safety and civil process to all Oklahoma Sheriffs.
- Support the development of laws and policies which focus on the primary responsibility of government - the public safety of its citizens.
- Provide information and technical assistance in support to the Sheriffs of Oklahoma to assist them in providing effective and quality law enforcement services to the citizens of Oklahoma.
- Encourage the involvement of each Sheriff to work towards promoting professionalism and high standards in county law enforcement.
- Promote positive interaction among all criminal justice agencies and associations in an effort to increase the effectiveness of law enforcement services to the citizens of Oklahoma and for the betterment of the law enforcement profession.
- Provide and objective analysis of planned activities for achieving targeted objectives and assuring proper expenditure of funding.
- Maintain and enhance the Office of the Sheriff in the State of Oklahoma.

== Executive Board ==
The Executive Board is the governing body of the OSA. The Board is assisted in managing the OSA by an Executive Director and a Deputy Director, currently Ken McNair and Ray McNair respectively.

The current Board members are:

- Sheriff Tim Turner of Haskell County, President of the OSA
- Sheriff John Whetsel of Oklahoma County, 1st Vice President of the OSA
- Sheriff Lewis Collins of Choctaw County, 2nd Vice President of the OSA
- Sheriff Frank Cantey of Mayes County, 3rd Vice President of the OSA
- Sheriff Jimmie Bruner of Stephens County, Secretary and Treasurer of the OSA
- Sheriff DeWayne Beggs of Cleveland County
- Sheriff Scott Jay of Beckham County
- Sheriff Bill Winchester of Garfield County
- Sheriff Don Hewett of McClain County
- Sheriff Joe Craig of Seminole County
- Sheriff Jerry Prather of Rodgers County
- Sheriff Gary McCool of Atoka County
- Undersheriff Brian Edwards of Tulsa County

=== Standing Committees ===
- The Jail Committee reviews training needs, existing laws and administrative rules pertaining to the operation of county jails. Committee also makes recommendations on training and amendments to existing rules or laws as appropriate.
- The Legislative Committee recommends creation and or amendments of laws and administrative rules affecting the operations of the office of Sheriff and forwards those recommendations to the Board of Directors for consideration.
- The Membership Committee encourages members of their respective staff, all sworn law enforcement personnel, the business community, and citizens who support law enforcement to join the Association.
- The Budget Oversight Committee reviews the annual budget and submits it to the Board of Directors for approval. The committee reviews the monthly expenditures by ensuring that all monies received are recorded and deposited in a timely manner. The committee also reviews the annual audit and makes recommendations to the Board of Directors.
- The Historical Committee is responsible for receives memorabilia for presentation to the Association. The Association maintains the memorabilia until such time that it is deposited into the future Oklahoma Sheriffs Association Museum.
- The Chaplains Committee will be composed of as many ministers of recognized faiths as necessary to offer or make available spiritual guidance to the members of the Association, law enforcement and communities of the State.
- The Bylaws Committee is responsible for an annual review of the Oklahoma Sheriffs Association Bylaws. The committee makes any necessary changes and submit to the OSA Board for approval.
- The Training Committee is composed of one Sheriff from each of the five regions to assist with the selection, location, and quantity of training made available to the sheriff's office throughout the year including at the annual conference.
