= Oklahoma Office of the Chief Medical Examiner =

Office of the Chief Medical Examiner
- Great Seal of Oklahoma

Agency overview
- Formed: January 2, 1962
- Headquarters: 901 North Stonewall; Oklahoma City, OK, 73117
- Employees: 77 FTE (2012)
- Annual budget: $6.2 million (2012)
- Minister responsible: Michael C. Thompson, Secretary of Safety and Security
- Agency executive: Eric Pfeifer, M.D., Chief Medical Examiner
- Website: Office of the Chief Medical Examiner

The Office of the Chief Medical Examiner (OCME) is the agency of the government of Oklahoma (USA) responsible for investigating sudden, unexpected, violent or suspicious deaths. In this capacity, OCME provides support services to State law enforcement agencies, prosecutors, and public health officials.

== Finance and staff ==
The Office of the Chief Medical Examiner was authorized a budget of $6.2 million for State fiscal year 2012. The Oklahoma Legislature authorized the agency to employ 77 full time equivalent positions for that period.

== See also ==
- Coroner
