= Oklahoma Department of Emergency Management =

- Department of Emergency Management logo

Agency overview
- Formed: May 29, 2003
- Headquarters: PO Box 53365 Oklahoma City, Oklahoma
- Employees: 35 full time employees
- Minister responsible: Tricia Everest, Secretary of Public Safety
- Agency executive: Annie Mack-Vest, Director
- Website: Oklahoma Department of Emergency Management

The Oklahoma Department of Emergency Management (OEM) is a department of the government of Oklahoma responsible for coordinating the response to a natural disaster that has occurred in the State and that has overwhelmed the abilities of local authorities. This is achieved primarily through the development and maintenance of a comprehensive statewide emergency management plan. OEM is responsible for coordinating the efforts of the federal government with other state departments and agencies, county and municipal governments and school boards, and with private agencies that have a role in emergency management.

== Mission ==
The mission of OEM is to minimize the effects of attack, technological and natural disasters upon the people of Oklahoma by preparing, implementing and exercising preparedness plans, assisting local government subdivisions with training for and mitigation of disasters, and by coordinating actual disaster response/recovery operations.

== Leadership ==
The Department is under the supervision of the Oklahoma Secretary of Safety and Security and under the executive control of the Department's Director. Under Governor Kevin Stitt, Tricia Everest is serving as Secretary (since 2021) and Annie Mack-Vest is serving as Director (since January 2024). The Director of Emergency Management is appointed by the Governor of Oklahoma with the advice and consent of the Oklahoma Senate, and serves at the pleasure of the Governor. The Director is head of the Department as well as the chief advisor to the Governor on emergency management.

Agency Director - Annie Mack-Vest

Senior advisor - Steve Palladino

Recovery & Resilience Division Director - John Dean

Preparedness & Response Division Director - Kevin Enloe

Chief Financial Officer - Brianna Thomas

Public Affairs Director - Keli Cain

Administrative Services Director - Shimeka Mack

Human Resources Manager - Christine Eubank

Resilience Manager - Michael D'Arcy

Disaster Recovery Coordinator - Samuel Rauh

Technology Solutions Manager - Zak Lagarda

State 911 Coordinator - Lance Terry

State Hazard Mitigation Officer - Matthew Rollins

== Functions ==
The Department of Emergency Management (OEM) is the lead agency on all matters related to responding to and mitigation threats caused by natural disasters. To perform this function, the Department works closely with the Oklahoma Department of Public Safety, the Oklahoma State Department of Health, the Oklahoma National Guard, and the Oklahoma Office of Homeland Security. During times when the Governor of Oklahoma declares a state of emergency due to natural disasters, all of these agencies report to and receive orders from the Governor through OEM.

These relationship only applies however when the state of emergency is from a disaster. During non-disaster time, the Department of Public Safety, which is responsible for general law enforcement of the State through the Oklahoma Highway Patrol, is the Governor's chief public safety agent. OEM reports to the Office of Homeland Security, during emergencies or otherwise, on all matters related to homeland security or an act of terrorism. The State Health Department is the lead agency on disasters caused by the spread of infectious diseases or bioterrorism.

The National Guard, under the direction of the Adjutant General of Oklahoma, becomes the lead agency on any matter (emergency management related or otherwise) whenever the Governor so directs or when the Governor declares martial law.

== History ==
The Department of Emergency Management was originally created as the Department of Civil Defense by legislative action in 1951. Soon after its creation, the Civil Defense agency and the Department of Emergency Resources Management were combined into one unified disaster aid organization, known as the Oklahoma Department of Civil Emergency Management. The Department of Emergency Management was created in 2003 during the term of Governor Brad Henry by the Oklahoma Emergency Management Act of 2003. Today it is the central point of contact for coordination of four closely allied functions: Hazard Mitigation, Community Preparedness, Emergency Response and Disaster Recovery.

== Programs and Services ==
The Oklahoma Department of Emergency Managements provides two programs for Oklahoma citizens: Individual Assistance/Human Services Program and Public Assistance Program. In addition to these two programs, OEM provides three services to help with mitigation and preparedness for disasters: Safe Schools 101, OK- WARN, and incident hotline.

The Individual Assistance Program/Human Services Program is predicated on connecting citizens individually and local/small business owners with OEM. This program guarantees that all local Oklahoma communities are up to date on all services available and technology in all four phases of disaster. In order to simplify this process, OEM uses a process of stages that ensures the most productive way for the program to benefit all communities. The four stages are coordination (connects with organizations), Activation (training), Respond (Plan in place for sustainability after disaster strikes), and Engage (oversight of all operations). In coordination with OEM there are other organizations who help with this program including The American Red Cross, Oklahoma Department of Human Services, and FEMA.

The Public Assistance Program is primarily a funding program to ensure that funds are accessible to Oklahoma and local Oklahoma governments from federal funds. These funds can also be provided to nonprofit organizations who participate in disaster relief. The Process starts with FEMA which specifically approves public assistance programs. These programs receive their money either from federal funds or grants. The available funds are given from these programs to the State of Oklahoma, which then distributes the funds to local community applicants (Oklahoma local communities must apply for federal money with reason for aid). Most of these funds are used to rebuild infrastructure damage from disasters.

The Safe Schools 101 service is a voluntary option to all schools in Oklahoma that allows for volunteer expert architects and engineers to assess the structure of schools and the possibility for the implementation for safe rooms. This service was implemented by the OEM after the deadly 2013 tornado outbreak that directly affected fifty-four schools in Oklahoma.

Oklahoma Weather Alert Remote Notification (OK-WARN) is a weather alert system that specifically was created to benefit the deaf and hard-of-hearing. With the fear of deaf and hard-of-hearing not being able to access knowledge of incoming weather events. OK-WARN provides these Oklahoma citizens with current weather events via specific pagers or email. This program is in accordance with the Individual Assistance/Human Services Program to help ensure local communities have resources available to help those specific people like those who are deaf and hard-of-hearing.

"The Incident Resource Hotline service ultimately allows for local government and emergency responders the ability to pre-identify resources which can be transported and the ability to know exactly what they’re receiving when requested".

== Budget ==
The budget of the Department of Emergency Management is divided between its operating fund, which is used to run administrative operations of the Department, and the state emergency fund, which is used to respond to and recover from disaster.

== Divisions ==
- Hazard Mitigation Division - assists local communities identify and implement long-term hazard mitigation measures
- Community Preparedness Division - provides forum for coordination between federal, state, and local agencies in responding to disasters
- Emergency Response Division - coordinates State emergency response operations and oversees Emergency Operations Center
- Disaster Recovery Division - implements procedures to deliver State and Federal aid to persons affected by emergencies
- Administrative Division - provides central direction to entire Department

== See also ==
- United States Department of Homeland Security
- Federal Emergency Management Agency
- Oklahoma Highway Patrol
