= Governor of Oklahoma =

Head of government of the U.S. state of Oklahoma

- State seal

- Flag

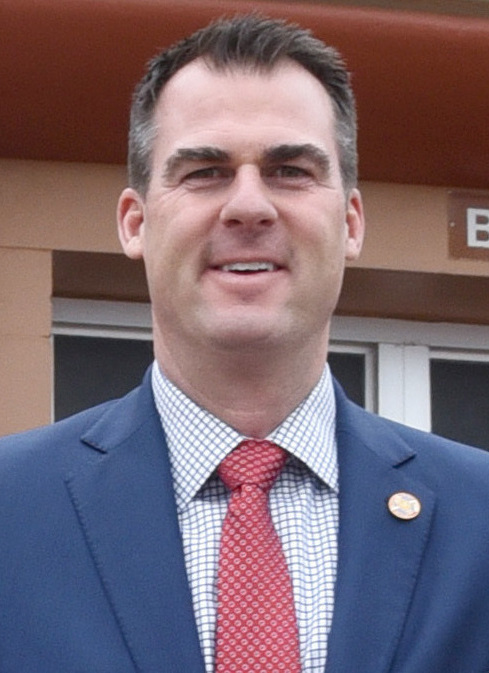
- Incumbent; Kevin Stitt since January 14, 2019
- Government of Oklahoma
- Style: Governor (informal); The Honorable (formal)
- Status: Head of state; Head of government
- Residence: Oklahoma Governor's Mansion
- Term length: Four years, renewable once
- Inaugural holder: Charles N. Haskell
- Formation: November 16, 1907
- Succession: Line of succession
- Deputy: Lieutenant Governor of Oklahoma
- Salary: $147,000 (2013)
- Website: Official website

The governor of Oklahoma is the head of government of the U.S. state of Oklahoma. Under the Oklahoma Constitution, the governor serves as the head of the Oklahoma executive branch, of the government of Oklahoma. The governor is the ex officio commander-in-chief of the Oklahoma National Guard when not called into federal use. Despite being an executive branch official, the governor also holds legislative and judicial powers. The governor's responsibilities include making yearly "State of the State" addresses to the Oklahoma Legislature, submitting the annual state budget, ensuring that state laws are enforced, and that the peace is preserved. The governor's term is four years in length.

The office was created in 1907 when Oklahoma was officially admitted to the federal Union of the United States as the 46th state, by act of the Congress of the United States and approval by the President. Prior to statehood, the western part of the future state was organized as Oklahoma Territory (1890-1907). In Oklahoma Territory, the chief executive, the predecessor to the elected state governors, was a territorial governor with similar powers who was, like other territorial governors, appointed by the President and confirmed by the United States Senate.

From 1834 to 1907, in the eastern portion of modern Oklahoma state, was the unorganized former Indian Territory, which originally encompassed a much larger tract of unassigned public lands west of the Mississippi River to the Rocky Mountains, reserved for various Native Americans / Indian tribes and nations, removed and transported from the Southeastern United States in the 1830s during the infamous "Trail of Tears". A federal judge of the United States District Court for the Western District of Arkansas, centered in the border town of Fort Smith, exercised judicial powers and sent individual and posses of U.S. Marshals and deputy Marshals to patrol that Territory in lieu of an appointed territorial Governor or other local law enforcement, governing structure or organized territorial government such as the several other federal territories in the Western United States (and later further away of territories of Alaska and Hawaii overseas), during the 19th and early 20th centuries, except for various Indian tribal police on the designated reservations.

Kevin Stitt is the 28th and current governor since 2019. He is a member of the Republican Party.

== History ==
=== Territorial period ===
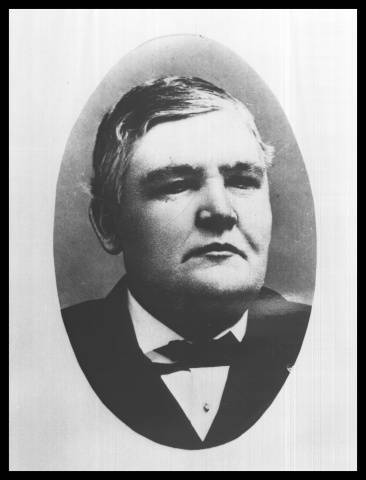
Abraham Jefferson Seay (1832–1915, served 1892–1893) as the second presidential appointed governor of the Oklahoma Territory (1890–1907)

Before statehood in 1907, modern day-Oklahoma was composed of the Oklahoma Territory (in the West since 1890) and the Indian Territory in the original far wider / greater expanse of the old Louisiana Purchase of 1803, including today's Midwestern and Western United States. Over subsequent decades through various treaties and outright land grabs, that expanse was later reduced gradually to the eastern half of the modern state from 1834 to 1907. While Indian Territory was semi-independent of the federal government and its military in far-off Washington, D.C. as Indian nations land, the Oklahoma Territory with its capital city at Guthrie, was an organized federal territory under the supervision of the President, with his executive departmental secretaries in his presidential cabinet, and both houses of the United States Congress (sending a territorial delegate to sit and speak (but no vote) on the floor of the lower chamber of the U.S. House of Representatives at the United States Capitol in Washington. Within the Oklahoma Territory, a traditional American democratic political system was created with Separation of powers and tripartite government existed just like the other states and federal government, including a territorial legislature, a territorial supreme court, and a territorial governor.

The incumbent president of the United States appointed territorial governors and assisting secretary to four-year terms, with "the advice and consent" of the United States Senate. Despite a set term, the governor served at the pleasure of the sitting American president, meaning that the president or his successor could replace him before his term was up.

The governor was the head of the territorial government. He had the power to veto legislation proposed by the territorial legislature and the power to appoint members to his cabinet of executive departments or bureaus, who in turn had to be ratified by territorial assembly lawmakers. The governor had the power to appoint justices to the territorial high court and any lower court judges. The governor was responsible to the president on addressing issues in the federal territory and served as the representative as the federal government of the United States in Washington. He was also the commander-in-chief of any organized the territorial militia.

George Washington Steele (1839–1922, served 1890–1891), served as the first governor of the Oklahoma Territory, appointed by 23rd President Benjamin Harrison (1833–1901, served 1889–1893), a Republican). He vetoed the territorial legislature's attempts to move the state capital from Guthrie to Oklahoma City or Kingfisher. He was instrumental in the establishment of two territorial (later state) universities that would eventually become the University of Oklahoma and the Oklahoma State University (at Stillwater). After only seventeen months in office, Governor Steele resigned effective October 18, 1891. In his place, President Benjamin Harrison then appointed Abraham Jefferson Seay (1832–1915, served 1892–1893), to the governorship as the second occupant. Robert Martin (1833–1897, served 1890–1893), then serving as the secretary of Oklahoma Territory, served briefly himself as acting governor in the four months interim from October 18, 1891, until February 1892, when Governor-designate Seay arrived and took the oath of office in Guthrie.

Frank Frantz (1872–1941, served 1906–1907), as the seventh and final governor of the Oklahoma Territory. As Oklahoma transitioned from territory to new state, he was also an unsuccessful candidate himself for election as the first governor of the new 46th state in the first state gubernatorial election of 1907 to be held.

=== Statehood-Present ===
After the Oklahoma Constitution was written and accepted in 1907, the Oklahoma and Indian territories joined to form the U.S. state of Oklahoma. The office of the governor of Oklahoma replaced the office of territorial governor. The new office was similar, but designed with new restrictions, limits, and legislative and judicial oversight. It was crafted as a "weak governor system" to defend the state against abuses of power that had occurred under the territorial government.

Oklahoma's first governor, Charles N. Haskell (1860–1933, served 1907–1911), wielded executive power effectively, but in the first 20 years after he left office in 1911, the assertive and dominant Oklahoma Legislature further reduced and limited the governor's office of several of its traditional powers and impeached two state governors: John C. ("Jack") Walton (1881–1949, served January–November 1923), and Henry S. Johnston (1867–1965, served 1927–1929). It was not until William H. ("Alfalfa Bill") Murray (1869–1956, served 1931–1935), took office in 1931 that the Oklahoma governorship regained the initiative and executive leadership with expanded its powers.

In 1927, the state legislature appropriated $75,000 for the construction of a governor's mansion and residence and $25,000 allotted for furnishings. The next year in 1928, the governor and his family moved in.

As Oklahoma grew and the state government expanded in its responsibilities and services, the office of the governor became gradually more powerful. As more agencies were introduced to perform certain tasks or address certain problems, the governor gained greater indirect influence through the power of appointment.

Initially the governor was not eligible to immediately succeed himself. It was not until 59 years later in 1966 that Oklahoma amended the state constitution to allow the governor to be reelected and serve two consecutive four-year terms (total of eight years), similar to most other American states and the President.

== Election ==
The governor of Oklahoma is elected directly by the voters of Oklahoma during gubernatorial elections held in November during the final year of each four-year gubernatorial term. The candidate with the highest number of votes becomes governor following the election. The Oklahoma Constitution requires the Oklahoma Legislature to choose the governor in the case of a tie vote.

Section Three of Article VI of the Oklahoma Constitution establishes that gubernatorial candidates must be citizens of the United States, at least 31 years old, and residents of Oklahoma for at least ten years prior to their candidacy.

Under Section Four in Article VI of the Oklahoma Constitution, the governor serves a four-year term in office beginning on the second Monday in January. Section Four also states that no person may hold the office for more than two consecutive terms. On November 2, 2010, voters passed a ballot initiative to limit governors to only eight years in office in a lifetime. The initiative also set the gubernatorial term of a lieutenant governor who becomes governor upon the death of the previous governor at two years.

Former governor David Walters (1991–1995) is eligible for a second term, having only served a single term.

=== Oath of office ===
"I, ........., do solemnly swear (or affirm) that I will support, obey, and defend the Constitution of the United States, and the Constitution of the State of Oklahoma, and that I will not, knowingly, receive, directly or indirectly, any money or other valuable thing, for the performance or nonperformance of any act or duty pertaining to my office, other than the compensation allowed by law; I further swear (or affirm) that I will faithfully discharge my duties as Governor of the State of Oklahoma to the best of my ability."

=== Last election ===
Oklahoma gubernatorial election 2022 results map. Counties won by Kevin Stitt Counties won by Joy Hofmeister

2022 Oklahoma gubernatorial election results
Party	Candidate	Votes	%	±%
Republican	Kevin Stitt	639,484	55.45%	+1.12%
Democratic	Joy Hofmeister	481,904	41.79%	−0.44%
Libertarian	Natalie Bruno	16,243	1.41%	−2.03%
Independent	Ervin Yen	15,653	1.36%	N/A
Total votes		1,153,284	100.0%	N/A

== Powers and duties ==
=== Executive powers ===
The governor, according to the Oklahoma Constitution, must "take care that the laws be faithfully executed." The governor is vested with "supreme executive power" as the state's "Chief Magistrate" and acts as head of the executive branch of Oklahoma. The governor has the power to issue executive orders that have the effect of law. The governor is the "conservator of the peace throughout the State," making him or her the chief peace officer in the state. In the position of chief peace officer, the governor commands state and local law enforcement agencies. If law enforcement entities cannot execute the law, then the governor, acting as Commander-in-chief of Oklahoma's state militia, may call out the Oklahoma National Guard to "execute the laws, protect the public health, suppress insurrection, and repel invasion." The governor is assisted in managing the military of Oklahoma by the Adjutant General of Oklahoma, an appointee of the governor.

The governor has the power to commission officers not otherwise commissioned by the law of Oklahoma and has the power of appointment. When any office at the state level becomes vacant for any reason, the governor, unless otherwise provided by law, has the power to appoint a person to fill such vacancy, who shall continue in office until the election or appointment of a successor. If the office of an Oklahoma member of the United States House of Representatives or United States Senate becomes vacant the governor calls a special election to fill the remainder of the term. In the case of United States senators, the governor is empowered by the U.S. Constitution to appoint someone immediately to fill the vacant Senate seat temporarily until a special election can be held.

Within the executive branch of Oklahoma government, the governor is assisted by the Lieutenant Governor of Oklahoma, the secretary of state of Oklahoma, the Attorney General of Oklahoma, and the state treasurer of Oklahoma, among others. While the other high-level executive offices are elected directly by the people of Oklahoma, the secretary of state is appointed by the governor with the consent of the Oklahoma Senate for a four-year term. Due to the large number of state agencies, the governor is assisted in running the government through the use of the Oklahoma State Cabinet. Through the Cabinet, the governor can address the assembled heads of Oklahoma's executive branch departments which oversee Oklahoma's agencies. A secretary appointed by the governor heads each department and carries out his executive orders through that department.

The governor is an ex officio chair of numerous state commissions and committees, including the Oklahoma Commissioners of Land Office and the Oklahoma Ethics Commission. While there are executive and state commissions of which the governor is not a member, the governor has appointment power to those entities with the advice and consent of the Oklahoma Senate, such as with the Board of Regents of the University of Oklahoma.

The governor is also responsible for preparing the proposed Oklahoma state budget presented to the Oklahoma Legislature in February for the next fiscal year beginning in July. After state legislators negotiate the terms of the budget with the governor, the Oklahoma House of Representatives drafts a general appropriations bill that must be approved by the legislature and signed by the governor.

=== Legislative and judicial powers ===
Like the president of the United States, the governor plays a major role in the legislative process. Every bill that is passed by both the Oklahoma Senate and Oklahoma House of Representatives, and every resolution requiring the assent of both chambers of the legislature, must, before it becomes a law, be presented to the governor. The governor may choose to sign it or veto it and send it back to the legislature. The governor's veto can only be overridden by a two-thirds approval vote from each house.

The governor has the power of the line-item veto, which allows them to sign part of appropriation bills into law, while sending appropriations items they disagree with back to the legislature. Items disapproved by the governor in this manner become void, unless the legislation is re-passed in both the Oklahoma House of Representatives and Oklahoma Senate with a two-thirds vote in favor of overriding the veto.

Bills that are part of the governor's agenda are often drafted at the initiative of the governor or governor's staff. In annual and special messages to the Oklahoma Legislature, the governor may propose legislation. The most important annual message to state lawmakers takes place in the annual State of the State address. Before a joint session of the Oklahoma Legislature, the governor outlines the status of the state and legislative proposals for the upcoming year. The governor is in a strong position to influence public opinion and thereby to influence the actions of state legislators.

The governor has the power to convoke the legislature, or the Oklahoma Senate only, on extraordinary occasions. During extraordinary sessions, state legislators can only act on subjects the governor recommends for consideration. Whenever a vacancy occurs within the state legislature, the governor shall issue a writ of election to fill such vacancies. In case of a disagreement between the two houses of the legislature, at a regular or special session, the governor may adjourn them to such time as he shall deem proper, not beyond the day of the next stated meeting of the legislature. The governor may convoke the Oklahoma Legislature at or adjourn it to another place, when, in his opinion, the public safety or welfare, or the safety or health of the members require it. Such a change or adjournment must be concurred by two-thirds votes in all branches of the legislature.

The governor plays an active role within the judicial branch of Oklahoma government. Oklahoma has a Judicial Nominating Commission consisting of thirteen members that review all potential justices and judges of Oklahoma's appellate courts, such as the Oklahoma Supreme Court, and review them to determine if they qualify to hold their respective positions. Of these thirteen members, the governor appoints six without the consent of the Oklahoma Legislature. The governor's appointments serve for a term of six years each; the terms are staggered so that approximately one-third of the appointments become vacant every two years.

In the event of a vacancy upon the Oklahoma Supreme Court or on the Court of Criminal Appeals, the Judicial Nominating Committee submits three nominees to fill the vacancy to the governor and Oklahoma Supreme Court chief justice. The governor must appoint one to fill the vacancy within 60 days or the appointment is turned over to the chief justice.

The governor also possess the power to grant commutations, pardons and paroles for all offenses, except cases of impeachment, upon such conditions and with such restrictions and limitations as he may deem proper, subject to such regulations as may be prescribed by law. The governor does not have the power to grant paroles if a convict has been sentenced to death or sentenced to life imprisonment without parole. To grant a pardon to an individual, he must submit the name of the individual to the Oklahoma Pardon and Parole Board composed of five members, three of which are appointed by the governor at the beginning of his term in office to serve a term that coincides with his own. After reviewing the applicant for clemency, and a favorable vote from the majority, the board may empower the governor to make such acts of as he deems necessary.

The governor has the power to grant after conviction, reprieves, or a leave of absence not to exceed sixty days, without the action of the board. The governor is required to communicate to the Oklahoma Legislature, at each regular session, each case of reprieve, commutation, parole or pardon, granted, stating the name of the convict, the crime of which he was convicted, the date and place of conviction, and the date of commutation, pardon, parole and reprieve.

=== Foreign relations ===
The governor, as Oklahoma's head of state, serves as the chief representative of Oklahoma to the United States and to the world. Deals between Oklahoma and foreign powers (including other U.S. states and the United States) are negotiated by the governor. This reflects the governor's position as the spokesman for the state and the state's interests to other state and world leaders. However, the governor may not make treaties with other nations or other U.S. states, as this is prevented by the United States Constitution.

In discharging his duty as chief spokesman, the governor may be required to testify before the United States Congress or meet with the President of the United States to address national issues that may affect the state. It is the governor's responsibility to promote Oklahoma's industries to the world economy as the spokesman for industrial development within the state. Along with those responsibilities comes the role of chief promoter of Oklahoma's goods and services to foreign consumers.

As Oklahoma's head of state, the governor may travel through the country to promote Oklahoma in a general interest or travel abroad to serve as proponent of America's interests.

=== Emergency powers ===
Pursuant to the Oklahoma Emergency Management Act of 2003 and the Catastrophic Health Emergency Powers Act, in case a natural or man-made emergency or a catastrophic health emergency occurs or is anticipated in the immediate future, the governor gains emergency powers to better respond to the emergency and combat the threat. Either the governor through executive order or the Oklahoma Legislature through concurrent resolution may declare a state of emergency. Once declared, the governor may exercise additional emergency powers. At any time, the governor (through executive order) or the state legislature (through concurrent resolution) may declare an end to the state of emergency and suspend the governor's emergency powers.

Upon the declaration of an emergency, the governor is allowed a limited-form of rule by decree. He assumes direct regulatory control over essential resources of the state. It will then be the responsibility of the governor to determine the priorities of such resources and allocate them as the governor may deem necessary. These resources include, but are not limited to, food, manpower, health and health manpower, water, transportation, economic stabilization, electric power, petroleum, gas, and solid fuel, industrial production, construction and housing.

The focus of the governor's emergency powers is to ensure the security and stability of the state. The governor receives comprehensive police powers in an emergency. In discharging those power to enforce laws, rules and regulations relating to emergency management, the governor assumes direct operational control of emergency management forces of the state, including the Oklahoma National Guard, state police agencies, state and local health departments, as well as county sheriff's offices and local police departments. These emergency police powers extend to providing for the evacuation of the state's population from any affected or threatened area or areas within the state, regulating the conduct of civilians and the movement of pedestrians and vehicular traffic, and regulating public meetings and gatherings. The governor is responsible for providing for the care of all those regulated by their orders.

During a state of emergency, the governor is authorized to use the services, equipment, supplies and facilities of all departments, offices and agencies of the state to the maximum extent practicable. State, county, and local officers and personnel must cooperate with the governor in emergency management, based upon he governor's direction. Any state, county, or local official that willful fails to obey any order, rule or regulation issued by the governor may be removed from office by the governor. However, before removal, officers must receives the charges against them and have an opportunity to defend themselves. Pending the presentation of charges, the governor may suspend such officers for a period not to exceed thirty days. Any vacancy resulting from removal or suspension shall be filled by the governor until it is filled as provided by state law. However, according to the Oklahoma Constitution, the governor may not remove from office the elective state executive officers, the justices of the Oklahoma Supreme Court, the judges of the Oklahoma Court of Criminal Appeals, and members of the Oklahoma Legislature.

When carrying out the functions of emergency powers, the governor is immune from civilly liable for any loss or injury resulting from any decision, determination, order or action in the performance of the governor's assigned duties and responsibilities during a stated emergency. However, this immunity does not apply when such loss or injury is caused by the gross negligence, or willfully and unnecessarily act by the governor.

== Relationship with lieutenant governor ==
The lieutenant governor of Oklahoma is elected at the same election as the governor, but not jointly as the running mate of the gubernatorial candidate. Oklahoma currently has a governor and a lieutenant governor of the same party, as both Governor Kevin Stitt and Lieutenant Governor Matt Pinnell are of the Republican Party.

The first instance of an Oklahoma governor serving alongside a lieutenant governor of a different political party began in 1963, when Republican governor Henry Bellmon served alongside Democratic lieutenant governor Leo Winters. Since then, there have been three more instances. In 1967, Republican governor Dewey F. Bartlett served alongside Democratic lieutenant governor George Nigh. In 1987, Bellmon served alongside Democratic lieutenant governor Robert S. Kerr III. Finally, in 2002, Democratic governor Brad Henry served alongside Republican lieutenant governor Mary Fallin.

The governor may appoint the lieutenant governor to their cabinet. For example, Governor Mary Fallin appointed Lieutenant Governor Todd Lamb to serve as her small business advocate within her Cabinet – although Lamb later resigned that position due to disagreements with the Governor.

A lieutenant governor can also serve as Acting governor. When acting as the governor, the Oklahoma Constitution provides all the powers of the governor to the lieutenant governor. This includes the power of signing or vetoing legislation, making political appointments, calling out the Oklahoma National Guard, or granting pardons. The need for the lieutenant governor to act as the governor may be due to the governor's absence from the state, or the inability to discharge the powers and duties of the office. When acting as governor, the lieutenant governor holds the powers of the governor until the governor returns to the state or found to be able to discharge the powers and duties of the office.

== Office of the Governor ==
Office of the Governor

Agency overview
- Formed: 1907
- Preceding agency: Office of the Territorial Governor
- Headquarters: Oklahoma State Capitol Oklahoma City, Oklahoma
- Employees: 39 unclassified
- Annual budget: $1.98 million
- Minister responsible: Kevin Stitt, Governor
- Agency executive: Denise Northrup, Chief of Staff
- Website: Office of the Governor

The Office of the Governor is the state agency that supports the governor in the performance of gubernatorial duties. The agency consists of the governor's staff and is headed by the governor's chief of staff. Staffers are political appointees and serve at the pleasure of the governor. They work in the governor's Oklahoma State Capitol offices in Oklahoma City, the governor's Tulsa office and the Governor's Mansion.

As of 2013, the agency has an annual budget of approximately $1.98 million. The budget provides funding for employee salaries and benefits, operation and upkeep of the governor's offices in the Oklahoma State Capitol and Tulsa, Oklahoma, and the operation and upkeep of the Governor's Mansion.

== Residence ==
Since 1928, Oklahoma governors reside in the Oklahoma Governor's Mansion. Before its construction, governors lived in various locations around Guthrie and Oklahoma City. Governor Charles N. Haskell set up his administration's office and his official residence within a hotel in Oklahoma City. The Oklahoma Legislature provided for the construction of an official residence after years of debate in 1927. The next year, in 1928, the mansion was completed.

Built by an Oklahoma City architectural firm, Layton, Hicks and Forsyth, the mansion is of Dutch-Colonial style. Carthage limestone was used so the exterior of the Mansion would complement the Oklahoma State Capitol, which is located to the west of the mansion. The state legislature allocated $100,000 of state money ($75,000 for construction and $25,000 for furnishing) to the project. Two years later, another $39,000 was set aside to complete outbuildings and landscaping. Though originally having 19 rooms, today the 14,000-square-foot (1,300 m^{2}) Mansion has 12, including a library, parlor, dining room, grand ballroom, kitchen, sunroom and five bedrooms.

The mansion also serves as an active museum. Throughout the mansion there are antiques and artwork from both museum and private collections. The museum is designed to provide a glimpse into Oklahoma's history and culture. Artists represented in oil and bronze include N.C. Wyeth, Charles Marion Russell, Thomas Moran and Albert Beirstadt.

== Succession ==
As per the Oklahoma Constitution, if the governor is impeached, resigns, dies, leaves the state, fails to qualify or is unable to serve, the lieutenant governor fills the vacancy, either temporarily or for the remainder of the gubernatorial term.

If, during a vacancy of the office of governor, the lieutenant governor is impeached, displaced, resigns, dies, is absent from the state, or becomes incapable of performing the duties of the office, the president pro tempore of the state senate is the next official in the gubernatorial line of succession. The Speaker of the Oklahoma House of Representatives is third in line of gubernatorial succession.

If the governor, lieutenant governor, senate president pro tempore, and speaker are unable to act as governor, then the next official in the line of succession becomes the emergency interim successor. As the emergency interim successor to the governor, the officer may exercise the powers and discharge the duties of the governor until a new governor is elected or until the disability is removed from the governor or higher official. However, the emergency interim successor does not inherit the title of governor, unless there is a man-made or natural emergency or disaster has occurred in the United States. The Oklahoma Legislature, by concurrent resolution, may terminate the authority of any emergency interim successor to exercise the powers and discharge the duties of the governor.

=== Line of succession ===
As provided by the Oklahoma Constitution and the Oklahoma Emergency Interim Executive and Judicial Succession Act, the line of succession to the governorship is as follows:

#	Office	Current Officer
	May succeed to governorship	
	Governor of Oklahoma	Kevin Stitt
1	Lieutenant Governor of Oklahoma	Matt Pinnell
2	President Pro Tempore of the Senate	Lonnie Paxton
3	Speaker of the House of Representatives	Kyle Hilbert
	May serve as Emergency Interim Successor	
4	State Auditor and Inspector	Cindy Byrd
5	Attorney General	Gentner Drummond
6	State Treasurer	Todd Russ
7	State School Superintendent	Ryan Walters
8	Labor Commissioner	Leslie Osborn
9	Corporation Commissioner (by length of tenure)	Todd Hiett
10	Corporation Commissioner (by length of tenure)	Kim David
11	Corporation Commissioner (by length of tenure)	Brian Bingman

== Timeline ==
Timeline of Oklahoma governors

== See also ==
- List of governors of Oklahoma
- Governors of Oklahoma Territory
