= Nemo =

Nemo may refer to:

== People and fictional characters ==
- Nemo (name), a list of people and fictional characters with the given name, nickname or surname
- Constantin de Grimm, illustrator of Vanity Fair caricatures under the name "Nemo"
- Nemo Ramjet, pen name of C. M. Kosemen (born 1984), Turkish artist and author

== Arts, entertainment and media ==
=== Gaming ===
- Nemo (arcade game), a 1990 arcade game by Capcom based on the Japanese-American animated film Little Nemo: Adventures in Slumberland
- NEMO (video game console), an unreleased console

=== Music ===
- Nemo (American band), an indie rock band
- Nemo (Belgian band), a former rock band
- Nemo (French band), a rock band
- Nemo (singer), a Swiss singer
- "Nemo" (song), by Nightwish from their album Once
- "Nemo", a song by Umphrey's McGee from their album Safety in Numbers
- NEMO Music Showcase and Conference, a former annual music event in Boston, Massachusetts

=== Other uses in arts, entertainment and media ===
- Nemo (magazine), devoted to classic comic strips
- Nemo (1984 film), directed by Arnaud Sélignac
- Network for the Establishment and Maintenance of Order, a fictional DC Comics organization created by the extraterrestrial Controllers

== Companies and organizations ==
- Saint Lucia National Emergency Management Organisation
- National Emergency Management Organization (Belize)
- Nemo 33, a diving center in Uccle, Belgium
- NEMO Equipment, Inc., a manufacturer of outdoor tents and shelters
- Nemo Rangers GAA, an Irish athletic club
- Paul Morris Motorsport, also known as Nemo Racing, a defunct Australian motor racing team (1999–2012)

== Places ==
=== Antarctica ===
- Nemo Cove, Pourquoi Pas Island, Graham Land
- Nemo Glacier, Pourquoi Pas Island, Graham Land
- Nemo Peak (Antarctica), Wiencke Island, Palmer Archipelago

=== United States ===
- Nemo, Missouri, an unincorporated community
- Nemo, South Dakota, an unincorporated community
- Nemo, Texas, an unincorporated community

=== Elsewhere ===
- Mount Nemo (British Columbia), in the Selkirk Mountains
- Mount Nemo, a crag in Mount Nemo Conservation Area, Ontario, Canada
- Nemo Peak, a volcano in the Kuril Islands
- Point Nemo, the place in the ocean that is farthest from land

== Science and technology ==
=== Astronomy ===
- NEMO (Stellar Dynamics Toolbox), a toolbox for stellar dynamics modeling
- NeMO, a NASA project for the Next Mars Orbiter
- 1640 Nemo, an asteroid

=== Vehicles ===
- Citroën Nemo, a small truck
- Sisu Nemo, a motor
- Nemo, a remotely controlled underwater vehicle operated by Tommy Gregory Thompson
- DSV-5 Nemo, a submersible used by the United States Navy between 1970 and 1986 to oversee and observe undersea construction work.
- German submarine U-505, a World War II submarine captured by the US and temporarily renamed USS Nemo

=== Electric power infrastructure ===
- NEMO, an Australian open source electricity system model
- Nemo link, a submarine power cable between the United Kingdom and Belgium, operational since January, 2019.

=== Computing ===
- Nemo (file manager), a file manager for Linux distributions forked from Nautilus
- Nemo Mobile, a Linux mobile system originally based on Mer

=== Other uses in science and technology ===
- Neutrino Ettore Majorana Observatory, a neutrino-related experiment in Modane, France
- Nucleus for European Modelling of the Ocean, a computational model of ocean circulation
- IKBKG or NF-Kappa-B essential modulator (NEMO), a protein
- NEMO (museum), a national science museum in Amsterdam

== Other uses ==
- Caisson Nemo, a former French rocket launch pad off the Riviera coast
- Patria NEMO, a mortar system
- February 2013 nor'easter, also known as "Winter Storm Nemo"
- Nemo, the theoretical fourth part of the human psyche that emphasizes the self's insignificance and meaninglessness, used in The Aristos by John Fowles
- Nemo (dog), French President Macron's dog
- Nemo A534, a German Shepherd dog who served in the US Air Force during the Vietnam War
- Nearly but not fully missing out, a variant of fear of missing out

== See also ==
- Nimo (disambiguation)
- NEEMO (NASA Extreme Environment Mission Operations), a program studying human survival in an underwater laboratory
