= White Crest Beach =

Beach in Wellfleet, Massachusetts

Coordinates: 41°56′3″N 69°58′47″W

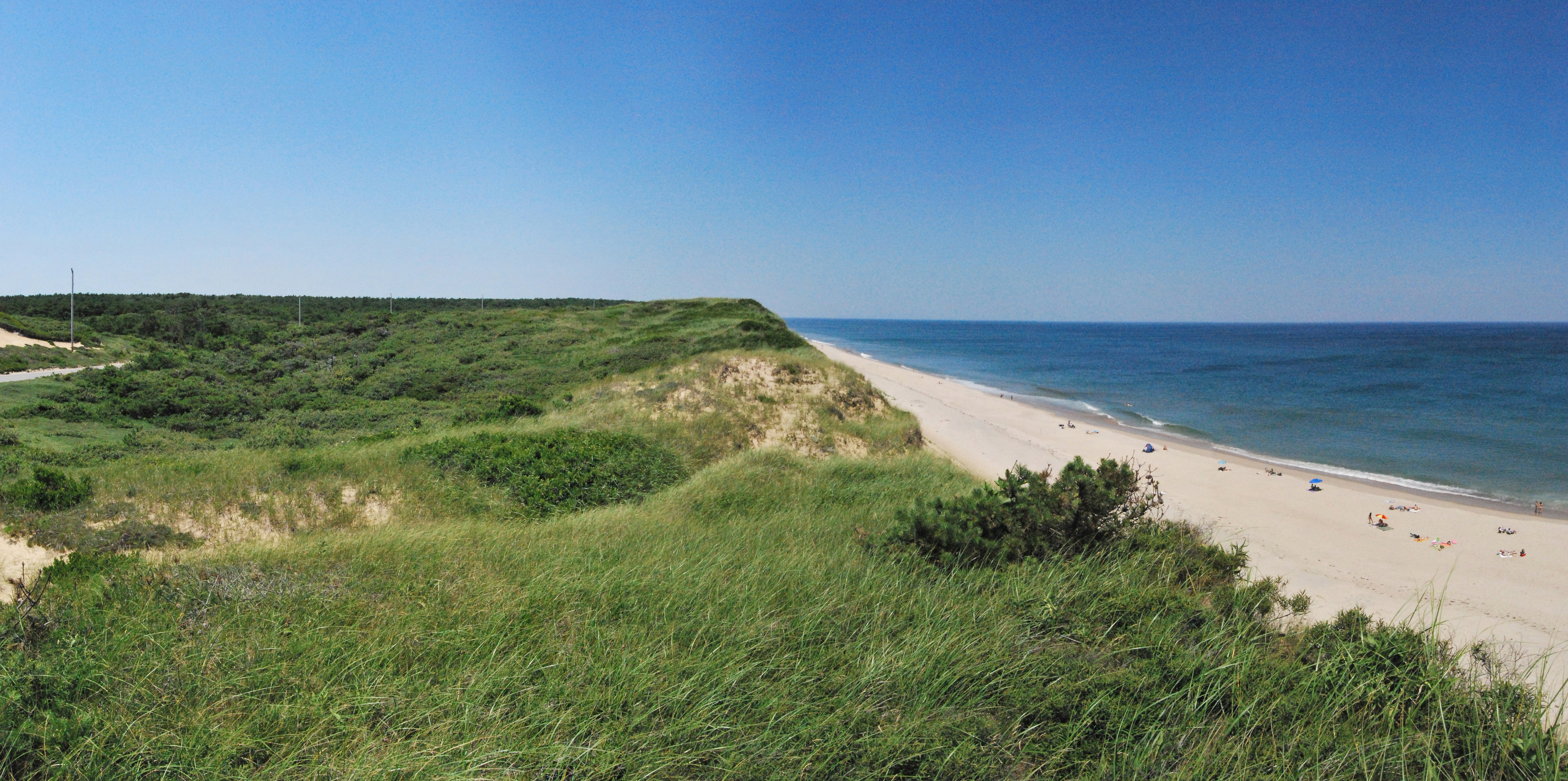
Dunes at White Crest Beach

White Crest Beach is a town-managed beach in Wellfleet, Massachusetts. Situated in Barnstable County, it is bordered by Cahoon Hollow Beach to the north, and Le Count Hollow Beach to the south. The beach is known for its large sand dunes, surfing waves, and panoramic views.

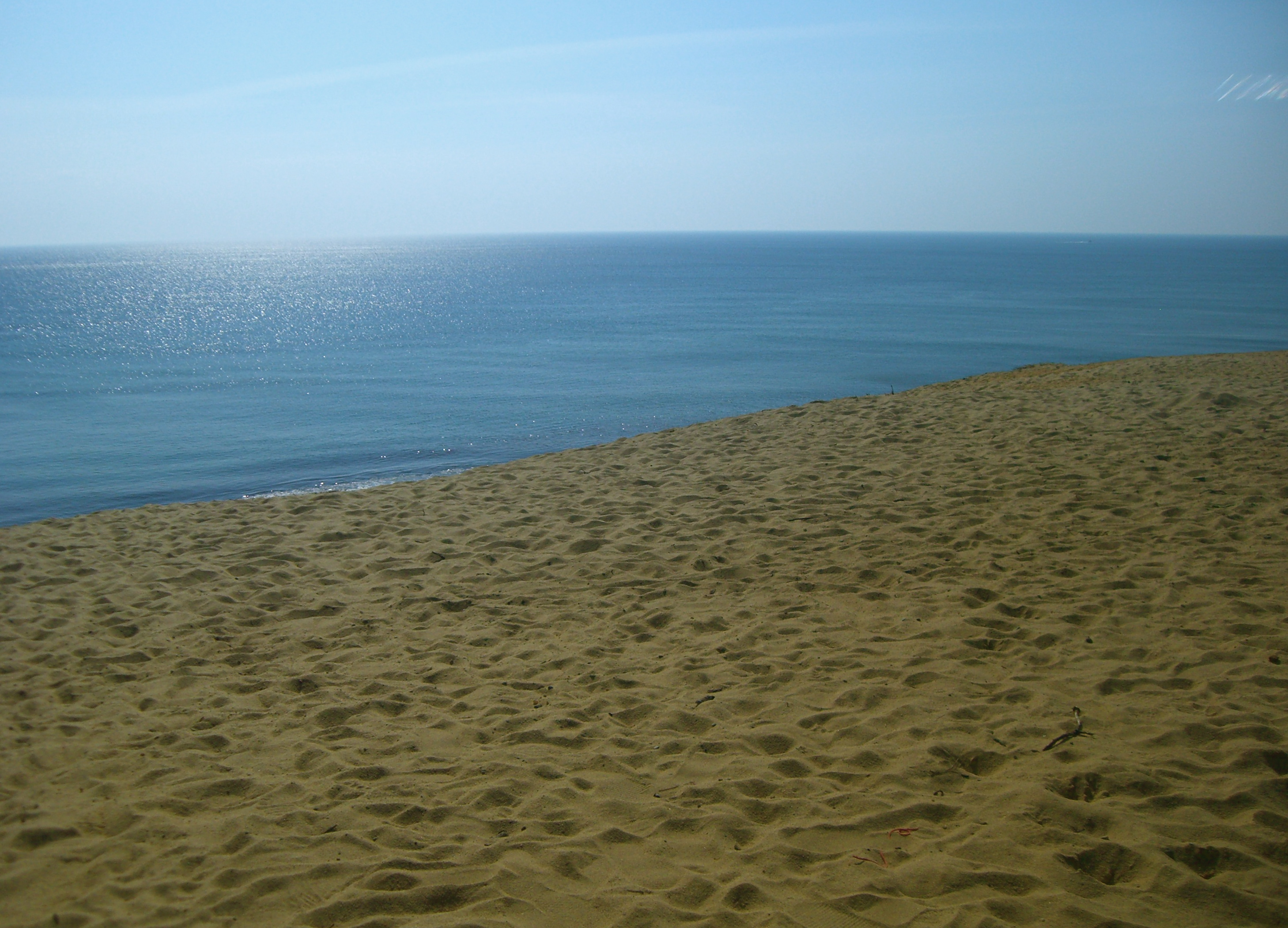
Sand and Ocean at White Crest Beach

== Facilities ==
Strong waves from Hurricane Erin (2025) at White Crest Beach

The main beach entrance is located at 740 Ocean View Dr, Wellfleet, MA 02667, off Ocean View Drive. The parking lot itself is at 520 Ocean View Dr, Wellfleet, MA 02667. Accessing the beach itself requires visitors to hike down dunes considered steep by some.

Parking is available for a fee, paid on site, and requires a town-issued permit. The beach has lifeguards on duty during portions of the day, and is equipped with accessible restrooms.

== Public safety ==
Signage posted at White Crest Beach advises visitors that the beach has strong rip currents which can be present even in shallow waters. Great white sharks live in the beach's waters; visitors are thus advised to avoid swimming near seals.

== Beach rules ==
Posted signage informs visitors of the following rules:

- Fires require a fire permit
- Pets must be leashed
- Metal detectors are prohibited
- Saltwater fishing requires a license
- Camping is not permitted
- Glass bottles are prohibited
- Alcohol is prohibited
- Visitors must follow a Leave No Trace policy
