= Caribbean Disaster Emergency Management Agency =

Intergovernmental network

The Caribbean Disaster Emergency Management Agency (CDEMA) is an inter-regional supportive network of independent emergency units throughout the Caribbean region. Formed on September 1, 2005, as the Caribbean Disaster Emergency Response Agency (CDERA), it underwent a name change to CDEMA in September 2009.

== Members ==
The participating member states and agencies of the CDEMA include:

Country	Organisation
Anguilla	Department of Disaster Management (DDM)
Antigua and Barbuda	National Office of Disaster Services (NODS)
Bahamas	National Emergency Management Agency (NEMA)
Barbados	Department of Emergency Management (DEM)
Belize	National Emergency Management Organisation (NEMO)
British Virgin Islands	Department of Disaster Management (DDM)
Dominica	Office of Disaster Management (ODM)
Grenada	National Disaster Management Agency (NaDMA)
Guyana	Civil Defense Commission (CDC)
Haiti	Directorate of Civil Protection (DPC)
Jamaica	Office of Disaster Preparedness and Emergency Management (ODPEM)
Montserrat	Disaster Management Coordination Agency (DMCA)
Saint Kitts and Nevis	National Emergency Management Agency (NEMA)
Saint Lucia	National Emergency Management Organisation (NEMO)
Saint Vincent and the Grenadines	National Emergency Management Organisation (NEMO)
Suriname	National Coordination Center For Disaster Relief (NCCR)
Trinidad and Tobago	Office of Disaster Preparedness and Management (ODPM)
Turks and Caicos Islands	Department of Disaster Management & Emergencies (DDME)

== Activities ==
The stated role of the CDEMA is to coordinate disaster response to member countries. CDEMA personnel worked in Grenada and Jamaica in early September 2004 after the passage of Hurricane Ivan.

During the mid-1990s, CDEMA provided disaster support for the eruption of the Soufriere Hills volcano in Montserrat. The CDEMA also regularly monitors the Soufriere Hills volcano, in addition to the active undersea volcano named Kick 'em Jenny, to the north of Grenada. Members of the Regional Security System have also requested military and logistical assistance through the agency after natural disasters.

== Background ==
The Pan-Caribbean Disaster Preparedness and Prevention Project (PCDPPP) was established in July 1984 to minimize the damage caused by severe weather conditions in the Caribbean region and the Gulf of Mexico. Prior to the establishment of the PCDPPP, disasters in the area were addressed by private donors.

The PCDPPP was a collection of international sponsors such as the United States Agency for International Development (USAID), the Canadian International Development Agency, the Government of the Netherlands, and the United Nations Disaster Relief Organization (UNDRO). The PCDPPP failed to break the Caribbean's direct and indirect dependence on Europe and the United States. Ultimately, the PCDPPP failed to achieve full participation from Caribbean countries.

In 1989, after the widespread destruction of Hurricane Hugo, there was a focus on creating more effective natural disaster management and preparedness. In 1991, the Caribbean Disaster and Emergency Response Agency (CDERA) was created. CDERA was formed by 16 participating Caribbean nations. With this organization, Caribbean countries had regional support along with international support. This increased the probability of aid coming from regional sources. CDERA would later change its name to CDEMA, the Caribbean Disaster Emergency Management Agency.

== History ==
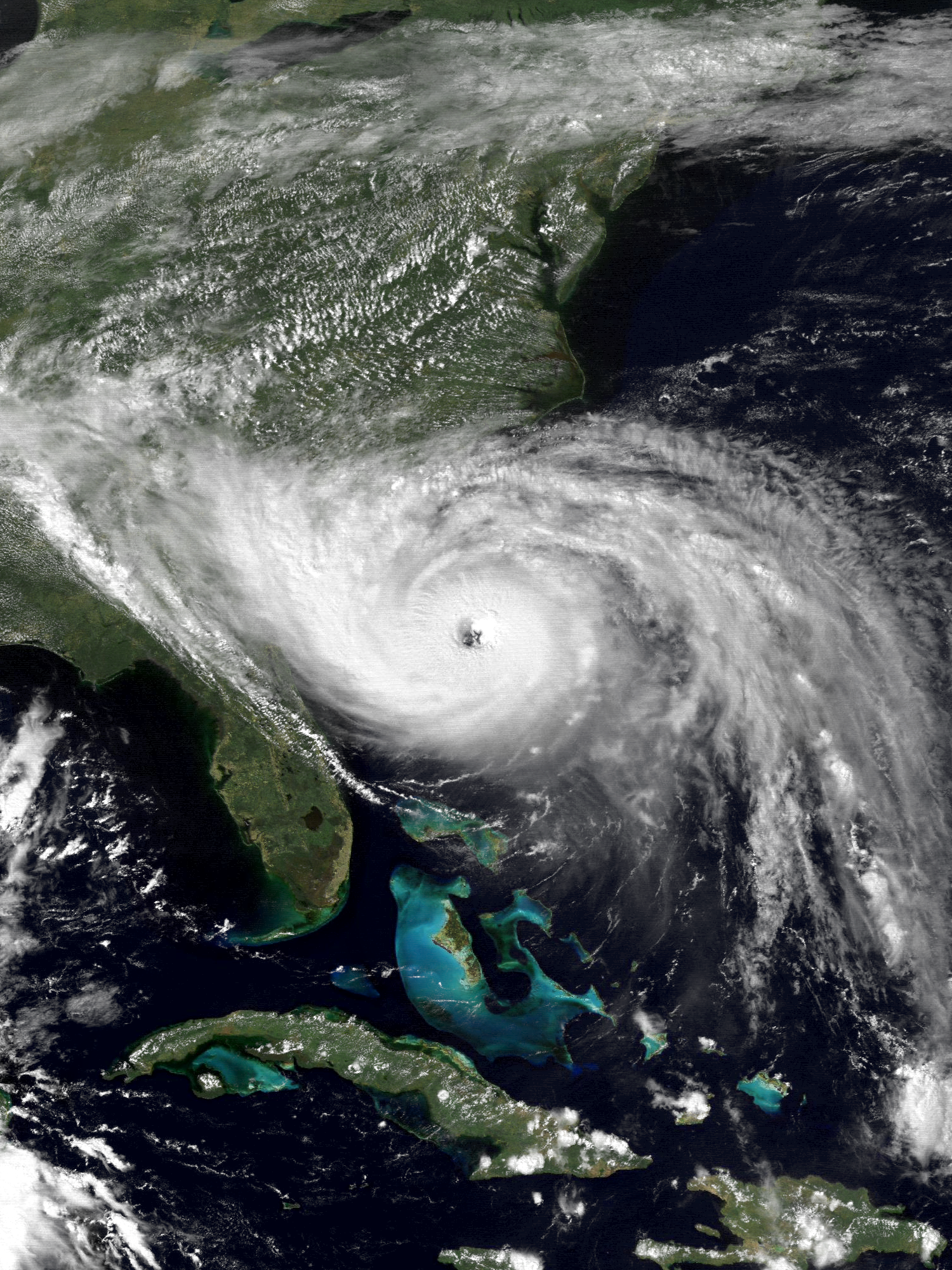
Satellite image of Hurricane Hugo from September 21, 1989

In 1989, Hurricane Hugo struck the Caribbean. Relief still relied on foreign aid from countries such as the United States. By 1990, the insurance companies were criticizing the PCDPPP and how it was necessary to revise the way in which the Caribbean responded to natural disasters. The construction industry, in particular, was criticized for not enforcing enough standards to ensure that structures could withstand disasters in the Caribbean. In 1991, the PCDPPP ceased to exist, and for about a month, the insurance agencies in the region were looking for a replacement. The Caribbean region met the deadline of June 1, 1991. Funding for disaster relief in the Caribbean has been an issue. In September 1991, the Caribbean Community (CARICOM) was finally able to take the initiative and set up CDERA.

The growth of CDERA is said to have been very slow throughout the 1990s. In 2003, studies showed that the Caribbean Metrological organization based in Trinidad and Tobago, had developed earlier warning systems in the Caribbean that were saving lives. There was still controversy over whether the people had confidence in this system.

In 2005, CDERA was planning to better coordinate with the tourism industry by preparing a response strategy for natural or man-made disasters. CDERA was also formulating plans to better train their employees and improve the spread of information. The Caribbean Tourism Organization (CTO) claimed the current system CDERA was using needed to become more integrated to avoid a "Tower of Babel" effect occurring. Also, later that year, CDERA coordinator Jeremy Collymore started putting pressure on the individual countries of the Caribbean Union to become more self-sustainable in case of an emergency, while aid from Japan was used to help develop the community's early warning systems and hazard management ability. With the recent tsunamis in Thailand and Somalia, aid was sought from the Pacific Tsunami Warning Center to develop earlier tsunami warning systems in the Caribbean. Research was done within the Caribbean, at places such as the University of Puerto Rico and the University of the Virgin Islands.

In 2006, financial aid from the European Commission granted CDERA 3.4 million. CDERA's projects are still being funded from outside sources. As of 2010, approximately 90% of funding for CDERA's projects comes from international donors. Along with funds being heavily dependent on foreign sources, staffing for CDERA has been a major hurdle. It has been said that some staff members of CDERA lack backgrounds in disaster management, and those in charge are low in the bureaucracy's chain of command.

In 2010, CDERA underwent a name change to the Caribbean Disaster Emergency Management Agency (CDEMA). They have recently focused on improving results through better connections with policymakers and technical officials.

== See also ==
- Canadian Hurricane Centre
- European Organisation for the Exploitation of Meteorological Satellites
- National Oceanic and Atmospheric Administration (NOAA)
- Caribbean Catastrophe Risk Insurance Facility Segregated Portfolio Company (CCRIF)
