= Nimmo (surname) =

Nimmo is a surname of Scottish origin. People with that name include:

- Alexander Nimmo (1783–1832), Scottish engineer and architect
- Alison Nimmo (born 1964), Chief Executive of the Crown Estate
- Bill Nimmo (1917–2011), American television and radio personality
- Bob Nimmo (1922–2005), American military officer and politician
- Brad Nimmo (born 1959), Australian footballer
- Brandon Nimmo (born 1993), American baseball outfielder
- Derek Nimmo (1930–1999), English character actor
- Dorothy Nimmo (1932–2001), British poet
- Emsley Nimmo (born 1953), Scottish Episcopalian priest
- Francis Nimmo (born 1971), British planetary scientist
- Ian Nimmo (born 1985), Scottish rugby player
- James Nimmo (1912–1984), Australian public servant and policy maker
- Jenny Nimmo (born 1944), English author of children's books
- John Nimmo (disambiguation), multiple people
- Julie Wilson Nimmo (born 1972), Scottish actress
- Lance Nimmo (born 1982), American football player
- Les Nimmo (1897–1972), Australian politician
- Liam Nimmo (born 1984), English footballer
- Myra Nimmo (born 1954), Scottish athlete and academic
- Pamela Nimmo (born 1977), Scottish squash player
- Paul Nimmo (born 1973), Scottish theologian
- Robert Harold Nimmo (1893–1966), Australian soldier
- Thomas Nimmo (1879-1943), Australian politician
- Vanessa Nimmo, South African contestant on Big Brother (British series 5)
- Willie Nimmo (1934–1991), Scottish footballer

== See also ==
- Nimmo (disambiguation)
