= Little Nemo (disambiguation) =

Little Nemo is the title character in a series of weekly comic strips that appeared in newspapers from 1905 – 1914.

Little Nemo may also refer to:

- Little Nemo (band), a French rock band
- Little Nemo (1911 film), an American silent animated short
- Little Nemo: Adventures in Slumberland, a 1989 animated film loosely based on the comic strip
- Little Nemo: The Dream Master, a video game based on the animated film

== See also ==
- Nemo (disambiguation)
