= Nimo =

Nimo or NIMO may mean:

- Nimo tube, a historic vacuum tube display
- Nimo language, a language spoken in Papua New Guinea
- Nimo, Ladakh, a village in Ladakh, India
- Nimo, Nigeria, a town in Nigeria
- Nimo TV, the global name of the Chinese streaming platform Huya Live

People

- Alex Nimo (born 1990), Liberian-born American soccer player
- Koo Nimo (born 1934), folk musician of Palm wine music or Highlife music from Ghana
- Nimo (rapper), German rapper
- Nimo Boulhan Houssein, Djiboutian politician

Abbreviations

- NiMo (Niagara Mohawk Power Corporation), an electricity and gas utility company now owned by the London-based National Grid plc
  - Niagara Mohawk Building (NiMo Building), the former headquarters of the above
- NIMO (non-interfering multiple output)
- National Incident Management Organization (United States), a seven-member team of professional incident managers with complex incident management as their primary focus

== See also ==
- Nemo (disambiguation)
- Nimmo (disambiguation)
