= National Office of Disaster Services =

Agency overview
- Formed: 1984
- Jurisdiction: Antigua and Barbuda

The National Office of Disaster Services (NODS) is an agency of Antigua and Barbuda that manages disaster management in the nation and region. NODS was created in 1984 from a cabinet decision. NODS is a part of the Caribbean Disaster Emergency Management Agency.

In the aftermath of Hurricane Beryl, NODS aided Saint Vincent and the Grenadines and Grenada with relief efforts. In preparation for Hurricane Erin, the agency organized a volunteer network for damage prevention and analysis.
