= Nimmo =

Nimmo may refer to:

- Nimmo, Somalia, town
- Nimmo (film), a 1984 Indian Punjabi-language film
- Nimmo (surname), people with the surname Nimmo
- The Nimmo Twins, English comedy duo (Owen Evans and Carl Minns)
- Nimmo (band), British electronic music duo
- Nimmo (actress), Pakistani actress (1950 – 2010)

== See also ==
- Nimo (disambiguation)
