= List of storms named Erin =

The name Erin has been used for seven tropical cyclones in the Atlantic Ocean:

- Hurricane Erin (1989) – Category 2 Cape Verde hurricane that stayed away from land
- Hurricane Erin (1995) – Category 2 hurricane that made two landfalls in Florida, resulting in 6 direct deaths and $700 million in damage
- Hurricane Erin (2001) – Category 3 hurricane that passed east of Bermuda
- Tropical Storm Erin (2007) – weak storm that formed in the Gulf of Mexico and made landfall in Texas, causing significant flooding
- Tropical Storm Erin (2013) – weak storm that formed near Cape Verde and then moved out into the open ocean
- Tropical Storm Erin (2019) – weak storm that formed off the coast of North Carolina but moved out to sea; its remnants produced heavy rain over the Canadian Maritime provinces
- Hurricane Erin (2025) – powerful, long-lived Category 5 hurricane that impacted Cape Verde, the eastern Caribbean, and the Atlantic coast of the United States, but did not make landfall
