= Tropical Storm Erin (2007) =

Atlantic tropical storm in 2007

- Tropical Storm Erin near landfall

Meteorological history
- Formed: August 15, 2007
- Extratropical: August 17, 2007
- Dissipated: August 20, 2007

Tropical storm
- 1-minute sustained (SSHWS/NWS)
- Highest winds: 40 mph (65 km/h)
- Lowest pressure: 1003 mbar (hPa); 29.62 inHg

Overall effects
- Fatalities: 16 direct
- Damage: $66.8 million (2007 USD)
- Areas affected: Texas, Oklahoma, central United States
- IBTrACS
- Part of the 2007 Atlantic hurricane season

Tropical Storm Erin was a minimal tropical storm that made landfall in Texas in August 2007. The storm's remnants also unexpectedly restrengthened over Oklahoma, causing damage within the Oklahoma City area as well. The second tropical cyclone to make landfall in the United States in the 2007 Atlantic hurricane season and the fifth named storm of the year, Erin formed in the Gulf of Mexico on August 14 from a persistent area of convection. It attained tropical storm status the next day before weakening back to a tropical depression just before it made landfall on August 16 near Lamar, Texas. Erin persisted over land across Texas before moving northward into Oklahoma as a remnant low. Due to the brown ocean effect, Erin's remnants briefly intensified while over Oklahoma on August 19, before it rapidly weakened and dissipated that same day. The storm resulted in sixteen fatalities and worsened an already-severe flooding issue in Texas.

== Meteorological history ==
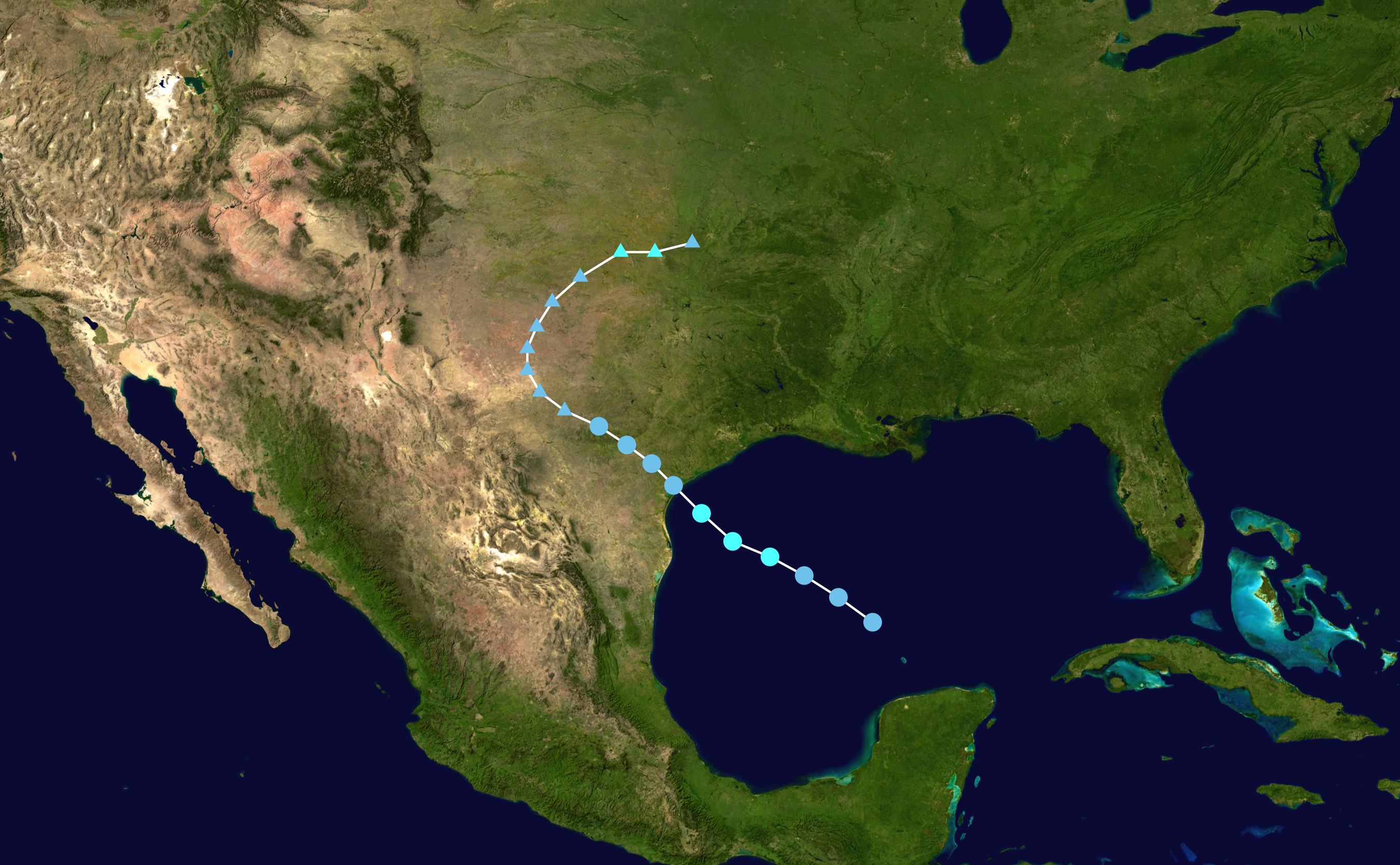
Map plotting the storm's track and intensity, according to the Saffir–Simpson scale Map key Saffir–Simpson scale Tropical depression (≤38 mph, ≤62 km/h) Tropical storm (39–73 mph, 63–118 km/h) Category 1 (74–95 mph, 119–153 km/h) Category 2 (96–110 mph, 154–177 km/h) Category 3 (111–129 mph, 178–208 km/h) Category 4 (130–156 mph, 209–251 km/h) Category 5 (≥157 mph, ≥252 km/h) Unknown Storm type Tropical cyclone Subtropical cyclone Extratropical cyclone, remnant low, tropical disturbance, or monsoon depression

On August 1, 2007, an area of convection developed just south of Jamaica in association with a trough of low pressure. The system tracked west-northwestward, and by August 10 consisted of a broad surface trough with minimal shower activity. Convection increased on August 11, and by August 12 the interaction between a tropical wave that had moved off the west coast of Africa on August 3 and an upper-level low in the area resulted in a large area of disorganized thunderstorms extending from the western Caribbean Sea into the central Bahamas. Upper-level winds gradually became more beneficial for development, and on August 13 a broad low pressure area formed about 90 miles (140 km) north-northeast of Cancún, Quintana Roo, Mexico. Late on August 14, a Hurricane Hunters flight into the system reported a small circulation center, but at the time was not well-defined enough to result in the initiation of tropical cyclone advisories. However, deep convection was maintained near the increasingly organizing center, and at 03:00 UTC on August 15 the National Hurricane Center classified it as Tropical Depression Five about 425 miles (684 km) southeast of Brownsville, Texas. Post-storm analysis indicated that the depression had developed three hours earlier at around 00:00 UTC.

In the overnight hours after formation, the storm was disorganized with a ragged and ill-defined center of circulation. Located to the south of a mid to upper-level ridge over the southern United States, the system tracked to the west-northwest through an environment conducive for further strengthening; an upper-level anticyclone developed over the central Gulf of Mexico, and sea surface temperatures along its track were warm. The cloud pattern became better organized, maintaining a large area of convection with curved rainbands and well-established outflow. Based on reports from Hurricane Hunters, the National Hurricane Center upgraded the depression to Tropical Storm Erin at 15:30 UTC on August 15 while it was located about 250 miles (400 km) east of Brownsville, Texas. At 00:00 UTC on August 16, it's pressure bottomed out at 1,003 mbar (29.6 inHg). However, as it continued northwestward, Erin remained disorganized and failed to strengthen beyond minimal tropical storm status. At 10:30 UTC, Erin weakened to a tropical depression and made landfall on San José Island near Lamar, Texas with winds of 30 mph (48 km/h) and a pressure of 1,006 mbar (29.7 inHg). At 15:00 UTC, the National Hurricane Center ceased issuing advisories on Erin as warning responsibility was transferred to the Hydrometeorological Prediction Center.

The remnants of Erin over Oklahoma, with what appears to be an eye-like structure

Drifting northwestward through Texas, Erin maintained an area of convection near the center, with its widespread but scattered rainbands dropping moderate to heavy rainfall. By 12:00 UTC on August 17, Erin had degenerated into a remnant low as its winds decreased to 20 mph (32 km/h) while it was situated about 60 mi (97 km) south of San Angelo. The system then turned to the north-northeast on August 18 as it rounded the aforementioned ridge, while heavy bands of thunderstorms continued to rotate around the center of Erin. Early on August 19 after entering Oklahoma, the remnants of Erin suddenly re-intensified to maximum sustained winds of 60 mph (97 km/h) and a pressure of 995 mbar (29.4 inHg) a short distance west of Oklahoma City. The Norman, Oklahoma National Weather Service remarked the intensification "[resulted] in what amounts to an inland tropical storm;" at 09:30 UTC the system presented an eye-like feature and a spiral rainband, and produced wind gusts of over 80 mph (130 km/h). However, a few hours later, the remnant low began to weaken again, and late on August 19, Erin weakened significantly as the circulation dissipated over northeastern Oklahoma, which was when Erin was operationally deemed to no longer be a tropical depression. Despite displaying tropical characteristics, the National Hurricane Center determined the system did not sustain deep convection long enough to be considered a tropical cyclone over Oklahoma. The low continued into southeastern Kansas before dissipating, feeding moisture northward toward a frontal system extending from the Midwestern United States through the Mid-Atlantic States. Its remnant mid-level circulation then moved eastward across Missouri, Kentucky, and Virginia before losing identity as it moved out into the Atlantic Ocean.

== Preparations ==
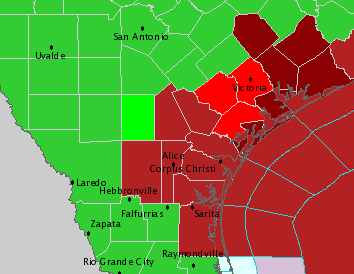
Weather alerts as Tropical Storm Erin made landfall in Texas
Weather alerts as Tropical Storm Erin makes landfall in Texas
Tornado Warning	Flash Flood Warning
Inland Tropical Storm Warning	Tropical Storm Warning
Flood Warning	Flash Flood Watch
Small Craft Advisory

Immediately upon becoming a tropical cyclone, the National Hurricane Center issued a tropical storm watch from Freeport, Texas to the United States/Mexico border; at the same time, the government of Mexico issued a tropical storm watch southward to Rio San Fernando. Shortly before attaining tropical storm status, the watch in Texas was upgraded to a tropical storm warning. Late on August 15, the warning was extended to San Luis Pass, while the watch in Mexico was discontinued. As Erin made landfall, the warning was canceled, and several flood watches and warnings were issued for counties across southeastern Texas. Upon moving into Oklahoma, flood and flash flood warnings were issued for several counties.

Governor Rick Perry activated the National Guard and mobilized emergency personnel to the region expected to be affected by the storm. Erin was expected to bring flooding to the region, which had already been declared a disaster area on August 7, 2007, due to widespread flooding on the Nueces River basin; this area remained flooded as of August 15, 2007. On August 15, oil futures rose to $74.01 (USD), due to fears of Erin disrupting oil supplies produced on Texan coasts, combined with low oil inventories. As a result of the threat from the storm, Shell Oil Company evacuated 188 workers on oil platforms in the northwestern Gulf of Mexico.

== Impact ==
=== Texas ===
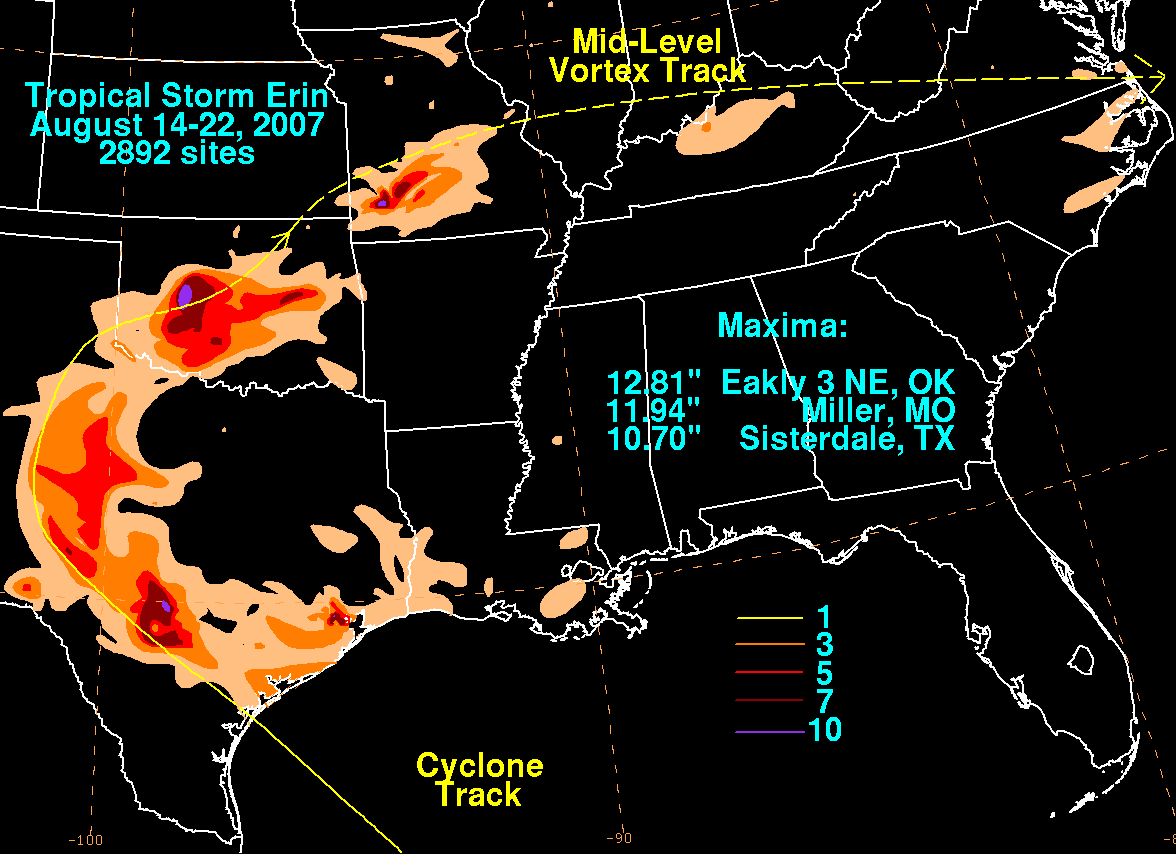
Erin Storm Total Rainfall

By midday on August 15, rainbands with gusty winds began affecting the Texas coastline. As it moved ashore, the storm produced heavy rainfall near and to the or northeast of its path, reaching 11.02 inches (280 mm) at a station in Lockwood. The storm caused several bayous in the Houston area to reach or exceed flood levels. Across southeastern Texas, the cyclone spawned several funnel clouds, and near IAH an EF0 tornado was reported. Wind gusts from Erin were minor across the state, peaking at 35 mph (56 km/h) at Palacios with an unofficial report of 39 mph (63 km/h) at Jamaica Beach. Upon moving ashore, the storm produced a minor storm surge peaking at 3.22 feet (0.98 m) at Pleasure Pier, which caused minor beach erosion.

In Clear Lake City, heavy rainfall collapsed a portion of a grocery store roof, killing one worker and one Coca-Cola merchandiser. The precipitation caused moderate flooding across eastern portions of Harris County; over 400 homes and 40 businesses were flooded. Flooding across the Greater Houston area briefly halted the METRORail and closed several state roads. One person drowned after driving into a retention pond. Several people required rescue assistance, and in Comal County a car accident caused three fatalities. The passage of the storm temporarily left about 20,000 electrical customers without power, though most outages were quickly restored. In San Antonio, one body was recovered from a creek and another died after driving into a flooded road and was swept into a drainage ditch in which four others survived. In Sisterdale, two people were killed when they were swept away stalled over Sister Creek. In Taylor County, near Abilene, flooding killed one person and forced the evacuation of about 2,000 people. Damage in Texas totaled over $45 million (2007 USD).

=== Oklahoma ===
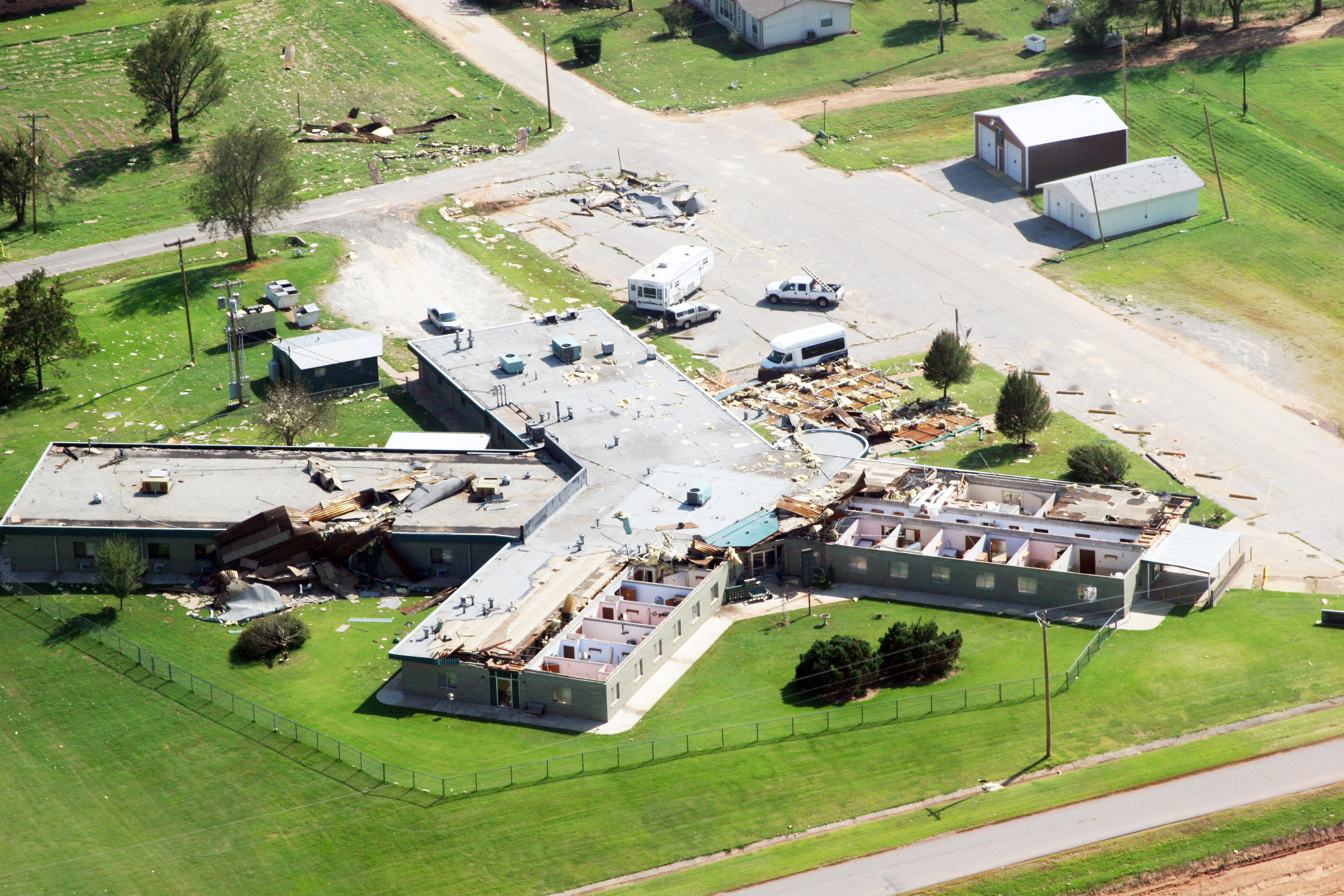
Geary, OK, August 20, 2007 – This nursing home was damaged by high winds from Tropical Storm Erin.

After its unexpected redevelopment over Oklahoma, widespread damage was also reported there. Several communities in central Oklahoma were flooded due to the heavy rainfall. Watonga, Kingfisher and Geary were the hardest-hit communities, where many houses and buildings were inundated. The weather forced the cancellation of the Hydro Fair as the carnival rides were not safe in heavy rain and high wind. Winds in Watonga gusted as high as 82 mph (132 km/h), which damaged numerous trees and power lines and heavily damaged mobile homes. The entire community lost power, as did about 15,000 customers in total in the Oklahoma City metropolitan area. A section of I-40 was also closed for a while.

One person drowned in a cellar in Fort Cobb, and another drowned in Kingfisher. Another storm-related death took place in Seminole. Three others were found dead after a weather-related automobile accident also near Carnegie. Damage amounted to over $2 million (2007 USD).

=== Missouri ===
Although its surface circulation had dissipated, its circulation aloft remained intact and led to a burst of rainfall early on August 20. The 11.94 inches/303.3 mm that fell at Miller became the wettest Missouri rainfall total associated with a tropical cyclone, or its remains, since at least 1972. One person died in Sleeper when he drove into flood waters which had swept away a bridge he was attempting to navigate onto. Nine water rescues occurred along the I-44 corridor, mostly caused by Erin's rainfall. Damage totaled about $19.8 million (2007 USD) in the state, primarily in Polk County.

== See also ==
- 2007 Midwest flooding
- Derecho
- Other storms of the same name
- Timeline of the 2007 Atlantic hurricane season
- Tropical Storm Bill (2015) – took the same general path and produced widespread rainfall across East Texas, Oklahoma, the Midwest, and Mid-Atlantic states
- Tropical Storm Imelda (2019) – took similar general path and devastated southeast Texas with severe flooding
