= Hurricane Erin (2025) =

Category 5 Atlantic hurricane in 2025

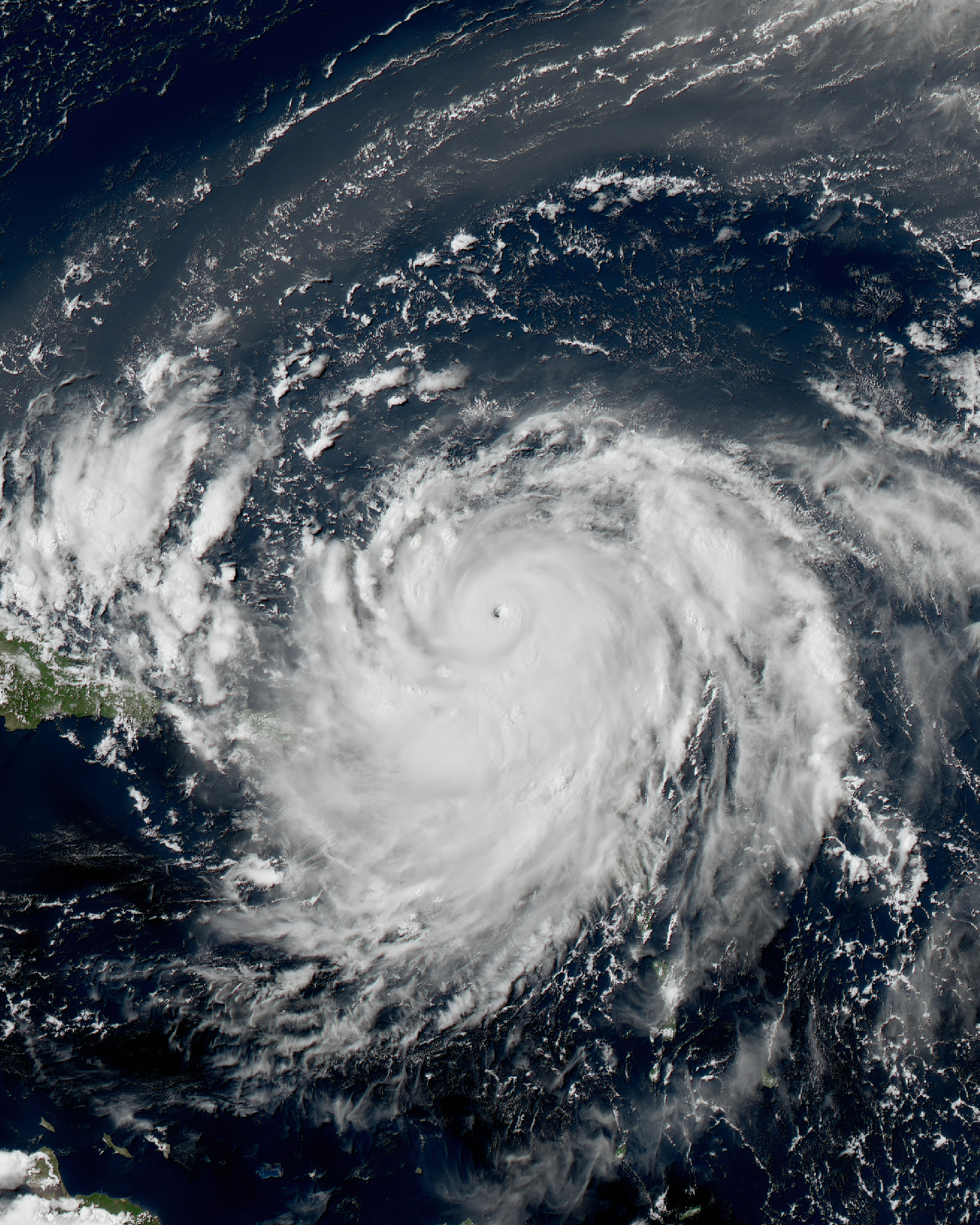
- Erin at peak intensity north of the Leeward Islands on August 16

Meteorological history
- Formed: August 11, 2025
- Extratropical: August 22, 2025
- Dissipated: August 28, 2025

Category 5 major hurricane
- 1-minute sustained (SSHWS/NWS)
- Highest winds: 160 mph (260 km/h)
- Lowest pressure: 913 mbar (hPa); 26.96 inHg

Overall effects
- Fatalities: 13 total
- Missing: 5
- Damage: $25 million (2025 USD)
- Areas affected: Cape Verde, Leeward Islands, Puerto Rico, Hispaniola, Lucayan Archipelago, East Coast of the United States (North Carolina, Virginia, and Massachusetts), Bermuda, Atlantic Canada (Nova Scotia and Newfoundland)
- IBTrACS /
- Part of the 2025 Atlantic hurricane season

Hurricane Erin was a very large, long-lived, and powerful Cape Verde hurricane that crossed the Atlantic Ocean in August 2025. The fifth named storm, first hurricane, first major hurricane, (Note: Hurricanes reaching Category 3 (111 miles per hour or 179 kilometers per hour) or higher on the five-level Saffir–Simpson wind speed scale are considered major hurricanes.) and first Category 5 hurricane of the 2025 Atlantic hurricane season, Erin developed from a tropical wave on August 11, while passing westward over Cape Verde. Afterwards, it stayed at tropical storm status due to marginally favorable conditions as it crossed the central Atlantic the next few days. As it neared the Lesser Antilles, it strengthened into a hurricane on August 15. Highly favorable conditions enabled Erin to undergo explosive intensification on August 16, reaching its peak at Category 5 intensity with one-minute maximum sustained winds of 160 mph (260 km/h) and a minimum pressure of 913 mb (27.0 inHg). An eyewall replacement cycle occurred later that day, and as a result, Erin fluctuated in intensity before subsequently weakening due to increasing vertical wind shear and dry air entrainment. It grew even larger while remaining steady in intensity while paralleling the East Coast of the United States from August 19 to 21. Erin turned eastward by August 22 as it began losing tropical characteristics, completing its extratropical transition later that day before fully dissipating early on August 28.

Erin's precursor brought intense flooding to various islands in Cape Verde, resulting in nine fatalities on São Vicente and leaving two people missing. Over 178 mm (7 in) of rain fell within five hours between 01:00 and 06:00 UTC on August 11. The government of Cape Verde issued a disaster declaration for São Vicente and Santo Antão the same day. A few days later, Erin killed one person in the Dominican Republic. Erin later produced life-threatening surf and rip currents along much of the east coast of the United States. While paralleling the coast as a Category 2 hurricane, its tropical-storm-force wind field spanned nearly 575 mi (925 km), making it larger than most hurricanes of comparable intensity recorded near the U.S. Atlantic coast. Since the start of the satellite era in 1966, only Hurricane Sandy in 2012 was larger. According to Aon, damage was estimated at US$25 million.

== Meteorological history ==
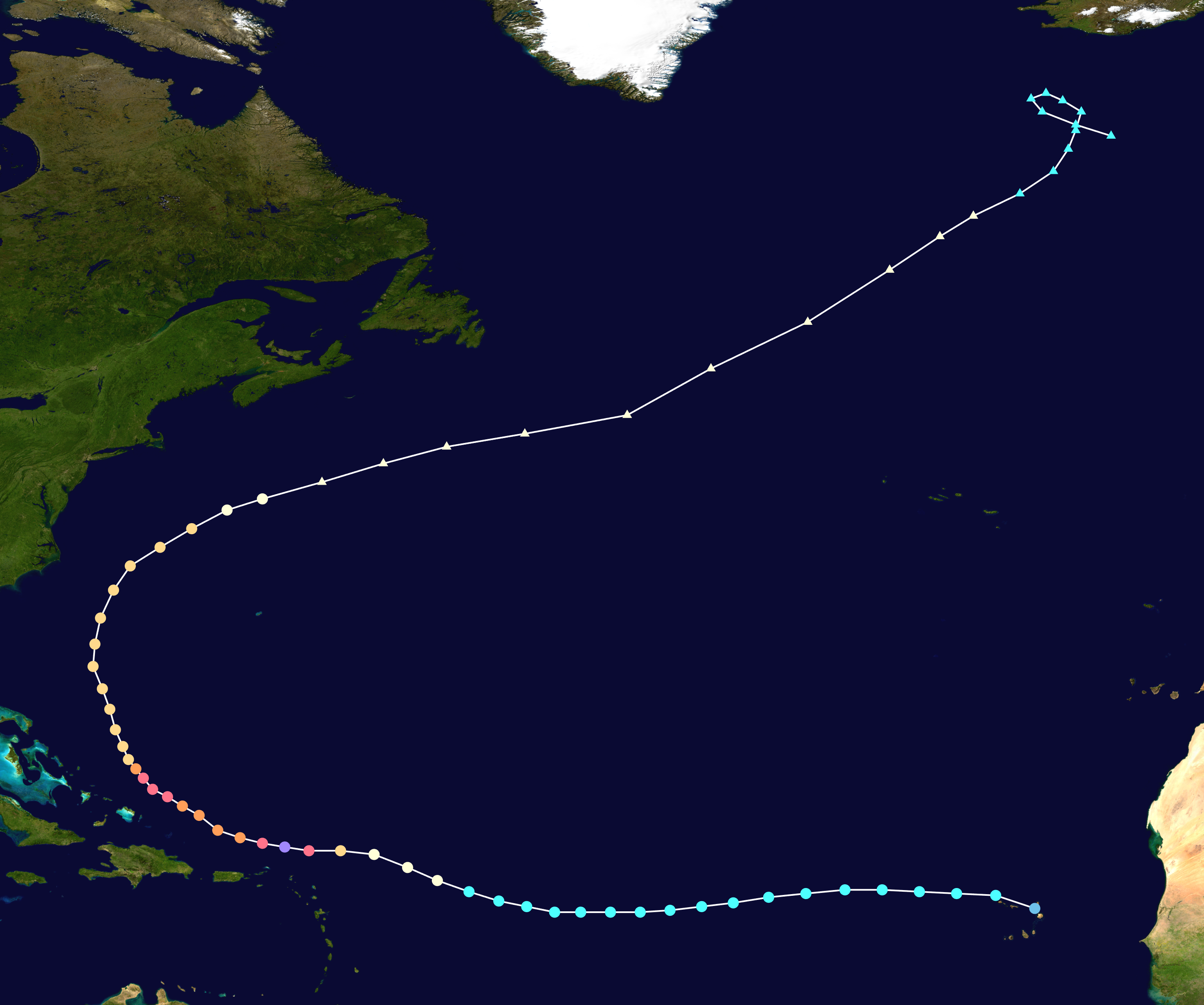
Map plotting the storm's track and intensity, according to the Saffir–Simpson scale Map key Saffir–Simpson scale Tropical depression (≤38 mph, ≤62 km/h) Tropical storm (39–73 mph, 63–118 km/h) Category 1 (74–95 mph, 119–153 km/h) Category 2 (96–110 mph, 154–177 km/h) Category 3 (111–129 mph, 178–208 km/h) Category 4 (130–156 mph, 209–251 km/h) Category 5 (≥157 mph, ≥252 km/h) Unknown Storm type Tropical cyclone Subtropical cyclone Extratropical cyclone, remnant low, tropical disturbance, or monsoon depression

On August 8, a tropical wave moved off of the West Coast of Africa, progressing northwestward towards the Cabo Verde Islands. As it neared the islands, deep convection began and it obtained a central closed circulation, becoming a tropical depression on August 11 southwest of Sal. Erin moved to the west after forming, landfalling on Santo Antão. Erin would progress across the Atlantic, moving westward to southwestward due to a nearby well-developed ridge to the north. From August 11 to August 13, low sea surface temperatures and dry air would prevent Erin from intensifying. On August 13, the convection became more concentrated near its center, and Erin strengthened slightly that afternoon. On August 14, Erin's deep convection became more fleshed out in organization and coverage. Erin was able to strengthen into a Category 1 hurricane by 12:00 UTC on August 15.

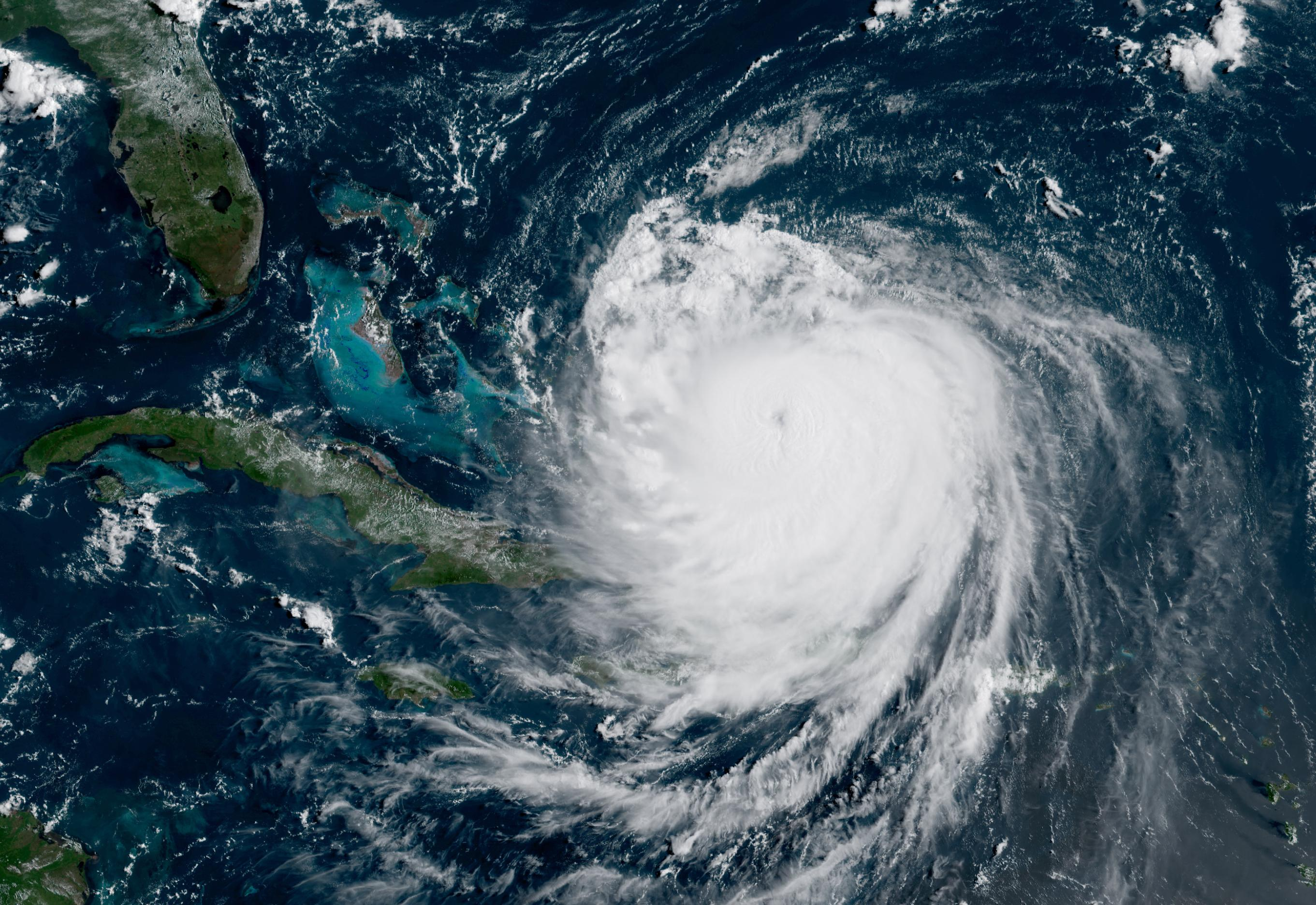
Hurricane Erin east of the Bahamas on August 18

The aforementioned steering ridge weakened slightly, turning Erin towards the west. Later that day, Erin's satellite presentation improved significantly, with a small pinhole eye becoming apparent; Erin subsequently underwent explosive intensification overnight and became a major hurricane early on August 16. This culminated in Erin becoming a Category 5 hurricane by 15:20 UTC that day, attaining its peak intensity with maximum sustained winds of 160 mph (260 km/h) and a minimum central pressure of 913 mbar (26.96 inHg), about 135 mi (220 km) north-northwest of Anguilla. At its peak, hurricane-force winds extended up to 30 mi (45 km) out from the center, and tropical-storm-force winds extend up to 160 mi (260 km) out. Erin's 24-hour intensification was the greatest of any Atlantic hurricane on record based on drop in central pressure before September 1. It held this intensity for much of the day, before commencing an eyewall replacement cycle; after both the Air Force Reserve and NOAA reconnaissance missions noted the presence of concentric eyewalls at Erin's core, weakening to Category 4 intensity. Further weakening occurred overnight into the early morning hours of August 17 to a Category 3. During the replacement cycle, the eye wall diameter increased from 6–12 mi (9–19 km) to around 45 mi (75 km). Erin also grew in size. Its hurricane-force windfield expanded to about 50 mi (85 km) from the center and the tropical storm-force winds extended outward up to 205 mi (335 km). After completing the eyewall replacement cycle, Erin reintensified to Category 4 late that day, and reached a secondary peak with sustained winds of 140 mph (220 km/h) and a central pressure of 933 mbar (27.55 inHg) on August 18. Late that same day, however, the system weakened again to Category 3, as it tracked to the northwest, east of the Bahamas. On the afternoon of August 19, Erin weakened to Category 2 strength, due to strong wind shear disrupting its structure, thus permitting dry air to infiltrate into the northwestern part of the circulation. However, as it moved over warm waters with abundant moisture on the morning August 20, Erin reintensified again, to a high-end Category 2 hurricane.

Overnight, Erin turned toward the east-northeast. Its broad windfield was continuing to expand, with tropical storm-force winds now extending up to 300 mi (480 km) out from the center. At 06:00 UTC on August 21, it made its closest approach to the Outer Banks of North Carolina, passing about 200 mi (320 km) southeast of Cape Hatteras. It was also about 465 mi (750 km) west-northwest of Bermuda at that time. Later, on the morning of August 22, the hurricane weakened to Category 1 strength due to 35–40 mph (56–65 km/h) of southwesterly wind shear and significant cold air advection, and began its transition into an extratropical cyclone, as it moved northeastward over open waters midway between Bermuda and Nova Scotia. Erin completed its extratropical transition that afternoon, about 260 mi (418 km) south of Sable Island, Nova Scotia.

== Preparations ==
=== Caribbean ===
NEXRAD Radar loop from Puerto Rico of Hurricane Erin at Category 5 intensity

On August 14, a tropical storm watch was issued for Antigua and Barbuda, Saint Barthélemy, Saba, Sint Eustatius, and Saint Martin. Tropical storm warnings were issued for the southern portions of the Bahamas and the Turks and Caicos Islands. Tropical storm warnings were also issued for offshore Puerto Rico. Saint-Martin and Martinique were also issued a yellow alert by Météo-France. In the Dominican Republic, yellow alerts were issued for the provinces on the northern coast. A flood watch was issued for Puerto Rico and the United States Virgin Islands.

The National Office of Disaster Services in Antigua and Barbuda mobilized volunteer response teams. Air operations were suspended in Saint Barthélemy. Terrance B. Lettsome International Airport was closed in preparation for Erin. Sandbagging operations were accelerated in preparation of Erin's approach in the Virgin Islands. In Puerto Rico, 200 employees from the Federal Emergency Management Agency (FEMA) were deployed in preparations for possible flooding. Six seaports in Puerto Rico and two in the United States Virgin Islands were closed by the United States Coast Guard. In the Dominican Republic, crews cleaned out drainage infrastructure in Distrito Nacional, and the beaches of María Trinidad Sánchez were closed. Public services in the Turks and Caicos Islands were suspended. A national systematic shutdown was issued for Grant Turk, South Caicos and Salt Cay. Some ports on the island were also closed down.

Liat Air cancelled flights to the British Virgin Islands and Saint Martin. Caribbean Airlines cancelled flights to Tortola. In Puerto Rico, more than 20 flights were cancelled. Royal Caribbean's Vision of the Seas was directed to Port Canaveral, away from the Bahamas, to stay away from Erin. The Disney Treasure service was rerouted to the western Caribbean.

On August 16, a tropical storm watch was issued for the Turks and Caicos Islands, later upgraded to a tropical storm warning 12 hours later. In the Bahamas, at the same time that evening on August 16, the southeastern part was placed in a tropical storm watch, later upgraded 9 hours later on the morning of August 17 to a tropical storm warning. The central Bahamas later was placed under a tropical storm watch on the morning of August 18.

=== United States ===
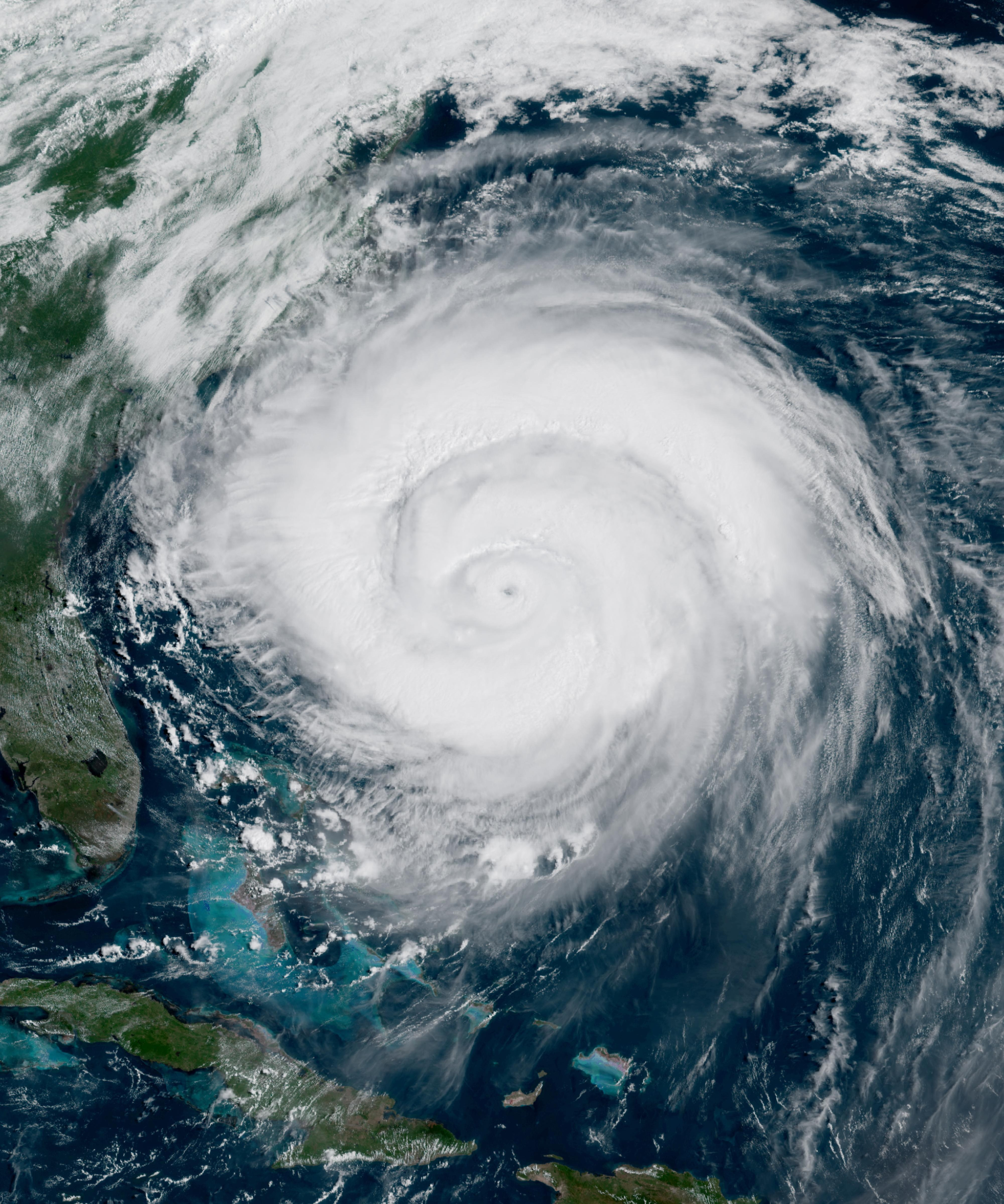
Hurricane Erin off the coast of the southeastern United States on August 20

Tropical storm warnings were issued from Beaufort Inlet to Chincoteague, Virginia. Dare County, North Carolina issued a state of emergency on August 17. Evacuations of Zone A were also mandated for August 18 and 19 on Hatteras Island. Ocracoke Island also had a state of emergency and evacuation order issued. Currituck County issued evacuations for Corolla and also declared a state of emergency. The governor of North Carolina, Josh Stein, placed 200 National Guard troops and three water rescue teams on standby for Erin. Crews in Tybee Island, Georgia cleared storm drains, cleared garbage, and secured signs. New Jersey, Delaware, and New York City closed their beaches. The Norwegian Aqua remained in New York City instead of making way to Bermuda to avoid Erin.

Rip currents created by Hurricane Erin caused hazardous swimming conditions along much of the east coast of the United States. In North Carolina, Wrightsville Beach and Ocean Isle Beach officials issued no-swimming advisories through August 22, after lifeguards reported making over 50 water rescues. New Jersey declared a state of emergency the same day, with Governor Phil Murphy urging people not to swim. Swimming was also banned in New York City from August 20-22 as Erin passed. Ferry service between Block Island and New London, Connecticut, was cancelled due to expected weather and sea conditions, as was ferry service between Cape May, New Jersey, and Lewes, Delaware.

=== Elsewhere ===
Bermuda was placed under tropical storm watch by the Bermuda Weather Service on August 19. It was upgraded to a warning on August 21. Ferry service to St. George's was cancelled. Orange Route Ferry Services were cancelled until August 25.

Crews in Nova Scotia ramped up efforts to control wildfires before Erin could change wind patterns there.

== Impact ==
=== Cape Verde ===
Heavy rainfall from Erin's precursor disturbance resulted in significant flooding across the Cape Verde islands, particularly in the northwestern island of São Vicente. After heavy rainfall inundated the island on August 11, vehicles were swept away and several homes sustained damage. A total of 7.57 in (192 mm) of rain fell in just five hours on São Vicente according to the Cape Verdean National Institute of Meteorology and Geophysics. Flash flooding from the sudden rain resulted in at least nine fatalities, including four children. Seven people drowned from the floods, while another person was electrocuted. An additional person was reported missing while 1,500 people were displaced by the extreme rainfall and floods. Debris and fallen trees blocked off roads, while power outages affected most of the island. The Uni-Mindelo Auditorium was destroyed. Officials estimated that losses from this incident were 12,000,000 Cape Verdean escudos. Various commercial buildings were damaged as well.

In response to the significant damage and deaths, the Cape Verdean government declared a state of emergency on São Vicente and the neighboring isle of Santo Antão. The National Civil Protection Service was deployed to the islands to address infrastructure damage. The service evacuated 36 and 26 people from Vila Nova and Alto Brava, respectively, on August 16. The World Bank Group allocated US$10 million to support recovery efforts from the storm. Over 200,000 international contributions were made to recovery for the islands, according to the Red Cross of Cape Verde.

=== Caribbean ===
Rough seas impacted much of the northern Leeward Islands and the Lucayan Archipelago. In Guadeloupe, 2.48 in (63 mm) of rain was reported at Col des Mamelles, in the Guadeloupe National Park, within six hours on August 16. Large amounts of sargassum washed ashore on Saint Martin and Rio San Juan in the Dominican Republic due to Erin. Two divers were rescued off of Saint Croix. Heavy rains caused roads to flood in Puerto Rico. Landslides, fallen trees and power outages were reported. Damage in Puerto Rico totaled to US$103,000. Grand Turk experienced tropical storm conditions, with roads flooding and rough seas. The Bahamas was buffeted with rough seas and thunderstorms from Erin. Localized flooding occurred on Mayaguana. A generator was sent to Cat Island by Bahamas Power and Light. Over 159,000 customers lost power in Puerto Rico. On August 18, a 36-year-old man drowned at Caleta Beach in La Romana, Dominican Republic amid dangerous swimming conditions caused by Erin.

=== United States ===
Although Erin never actually made landfall in the United States, several locations along the Outer Banks of North Carolina and Virginia recorded major flooding late on August 21, around high tide. Minor to moderate coastal flooding was reported in nine other states, from Maryland north to Maine.

==== North Carolina ====
A station near Nags Head recorded winds of 45 mph (72 km/h) on August 21, with gusts of 54 mph (87 km/h). Strong winds knocked down an 80-foot wind turbine onto a building in Kill Devil Hills, causing mostly minor damage. Waves on the Outer Banks reached 20 feet (6.1 m) and the storm surge was around 2 to 4 feet (0.61 to 1.22 m). Parts of NC 12 became flooded due to storm surges, with the road being closed from Oregon Inlet to Hatteras. Over 2,200 people were evacuated from the Outer Banks. Erin caused only minimal beach erosion at Wrightsville Beach; farther north in the Outer Banks, however, waves did top sand dunes in a few areas, flooding oceanfront neighborhoods.

==== Massachusetts ====
Nantucket was battered by waves and experienced significant beach erosion from swells generated by the storm. Wind gusts from Erin’s large wind field extended into Cape Cod and coastal Massachusetts, with wind gusts reaching 50 mph (80 km/h) in Nantucket. High waves and rough ocean conditions led to the closure of the ferry service to Martha's Vineyard between August 21 and 22. All across the Cape Cod region, beaches were closed due to high surf and rip currents, including in Nantucket and Westport. A boat capsized off Salisbury Beach, leading to a man being taken into the hospital and another missing.

==== Other states ====
Storm surge in Virginia peaked at 3.3 feet (1.0 m) at Wachapreague. Approximately 50 people were rescued from along the Jersey Shore after coastal flooding inundated roads and buildings. Some areas of Atlantic City's beaches lost up to 5 feet (1.5 m) of sand. Some dune fences were damaged, allowing them to shift significantly. Storm surge in the state (and Delaware) peaked at 3 feet (0.91 m) in Delaware Bay. Coastal flooding in New York led to flooded streets in portions of Howard Beach and Far Rockaway, areas of Freeport and Jones Beach also experienced coastal flooding near high tide. Near tropical storm-force wind gusts of 38 mph (61 km/h) were reported in Farmingdale, Long Island and a 39 mph (63 km/h) gust near John F. Kennedy International Airport. Large swells of 9 ft (2.74 m) also occurred off Rockaway Beach. A boy drowned while swimming off Hampton Beach, New Hampshire. Another man drowned off Fire Island National Seashore in New York. A man in Maine was rescued from a capsized boat.

Northwest winds from the storm blew smoke from a wildfire in the Everglades across Southern Florida, particularly affecting air quality in Broward County.

Despite being far from the storm, Arkansas, Tennessee, and Mississippi saw some effects. Upper level winds from Erin steered the remnants of a Mesoscale convective system into the states. Strong winds downed trees and power lines. In Tennessee, a car crashed into a downed tree, killing the driver. Damage in these states totaled to US$70,000.

=== Elsewhere ===
At the National Museum of Bermuda, sustained winds were recorded at 47 mph (76 km/h) and gusts at 59 mph (95 km/h). Hundreds lost power in Bermuda (less than 6.5% of customers), with Pembroke Parish having the most customers out. Inbound flights to Hamilton were delayed due to Erin.

== See also ==
- Weather of 2025
- Tropical cyclones in 2025
- Timeline of the 2025 Atlantic hurricane season
- Other storms named Erin
- List of Category 5 Atlantic hurricanes
- List of West Africa hurricanes
- List of North Carolina hurricanes (2000–present)
