= Tao-Rusyr Caldera =

Stratovolcano with a caldera on the island of Onekotan

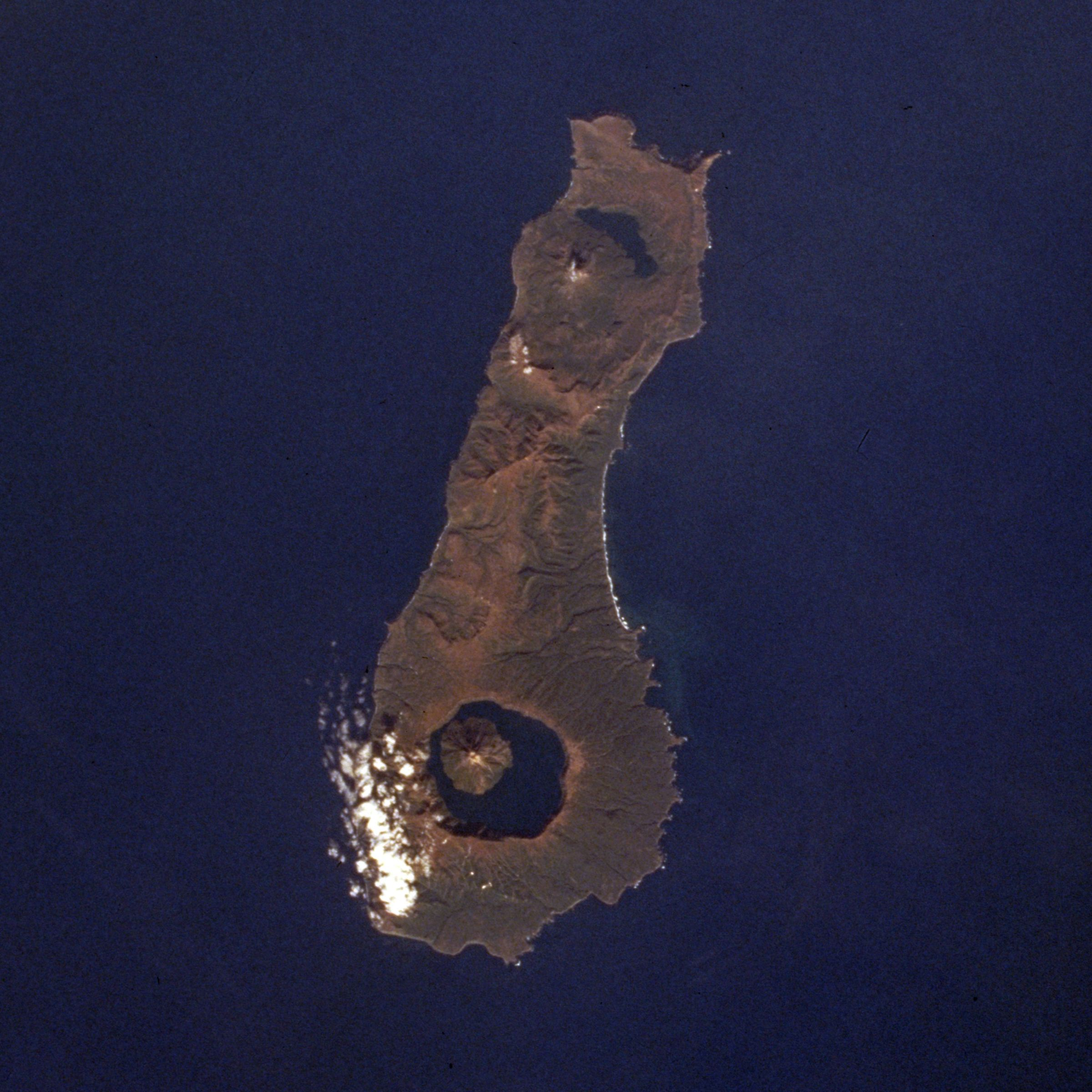
- Onekotan Island, with Nemo Peak at top (north) and Tao-Rusyr Caldera at bottom.

Highest point
- Elevation: 1,325 m (4,347 ft)
- Prominence: 1,325 m (4,347 ft)
- Listing: Ribu
- Coordinates: 49.35°N 154.70°E

Geography
- Location within Russia Location within Sakhalin Oblast
- Location: Onekotan, Kuril Islands, Russia

Geology
- Mountain type: Stratovolcano / Caldera
- Last eruption: November 1952

Tao-Rusyr Caldera (Russian: Тао-Русыр) is a stratovolcano located at the southern end of Onekotan Island, Kuril Islands, Russia. It has 7.5 km wide caldera formed during a catastrophic eruption less than 10,000 years ago (reported ages range from 5,550 to 9,400 Before Present). The waters of Kol'tsevoe Lake (Russian: Кольцевое озеро, Ring Lake) fill the caldera, along with a large symmetrical andesitic cone, Krenitsyn Peak (Russian: Креницын; Japanese 黒石山; Kuroishiyama), that rises as an island within the lake. This volcano was named after Captain Pyotr Krenitsyn of the Imperial Russian Navy.

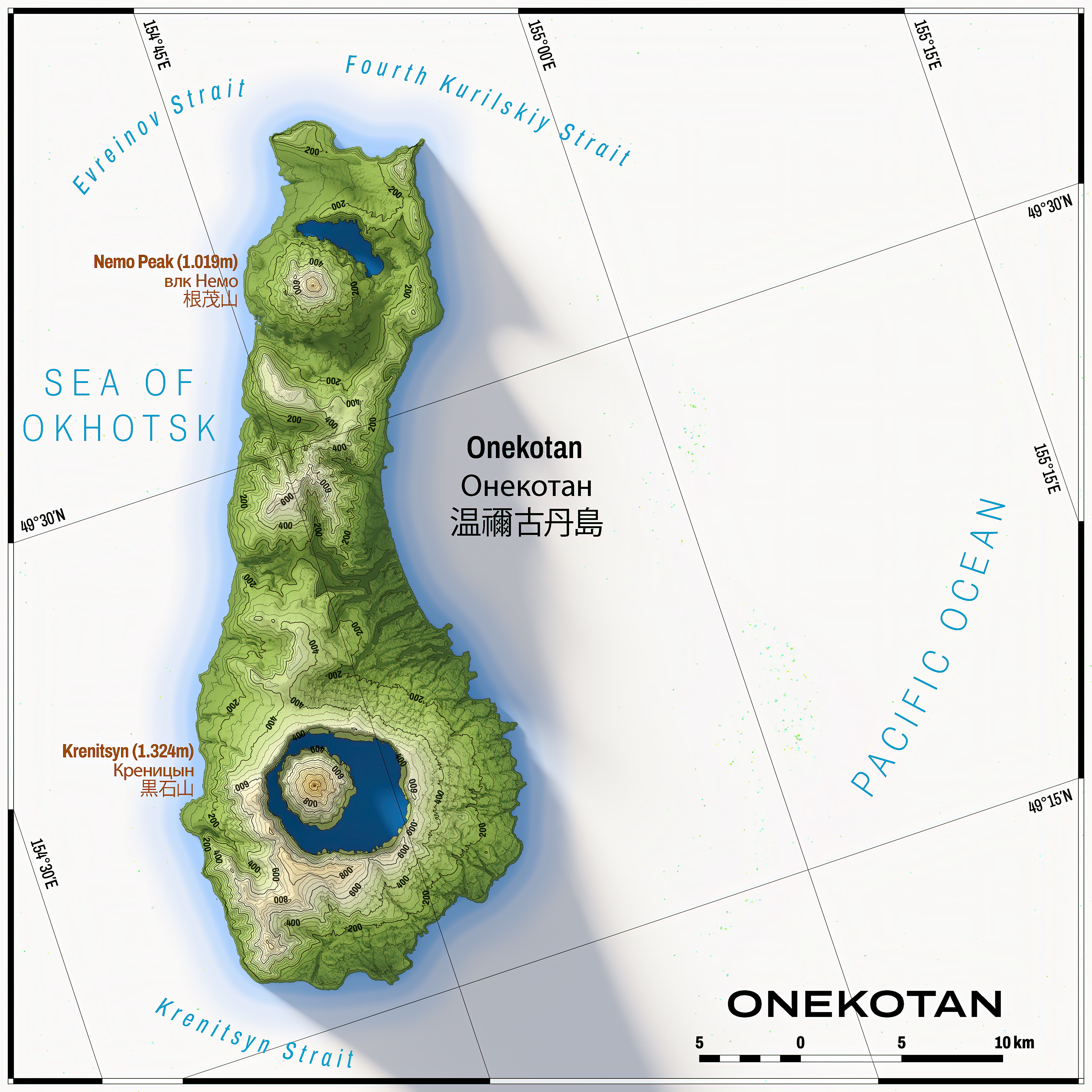
Topographic map of Onekotan Island with Tao-Rusyr Caldera at bottom

== Eruptive history ==
The most recent eruption, in 1952, formed a small lava dome on the island's coast. Krenitsyn Peak has a summit crater 350 m wide and is the highest point of the volcano and on the entire Onekotan Island. Another caldera, Nemo Peak, lies at the northern end of the island, and it also contains a central cone and crater lake.

The caldera forming eruption yielded about 50–60 cubic kilometres (12–14 cu mi) of material and destroyed the upper parts of the pre-existing volcano. The event has been potentially identified in the GISP2 ice core.

The caldera forming eruption wiped out vegetation on southern Onekotan, and it took a long time for it to recover. Only one historical eruption occurred at Tao-Rusyr, just after the 1952 Severo-Kurilsk earthquake.

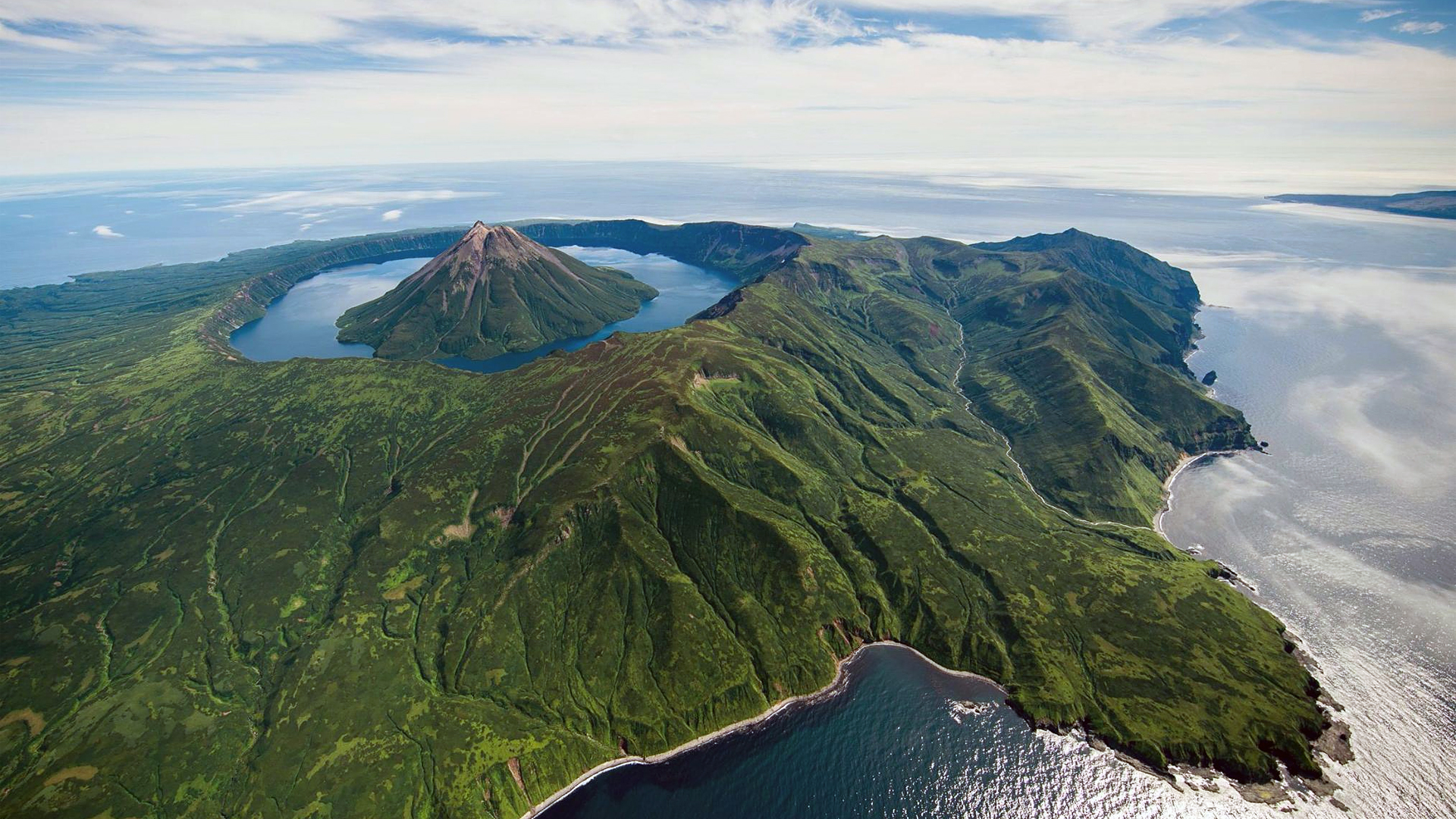
Oblique aerial photo

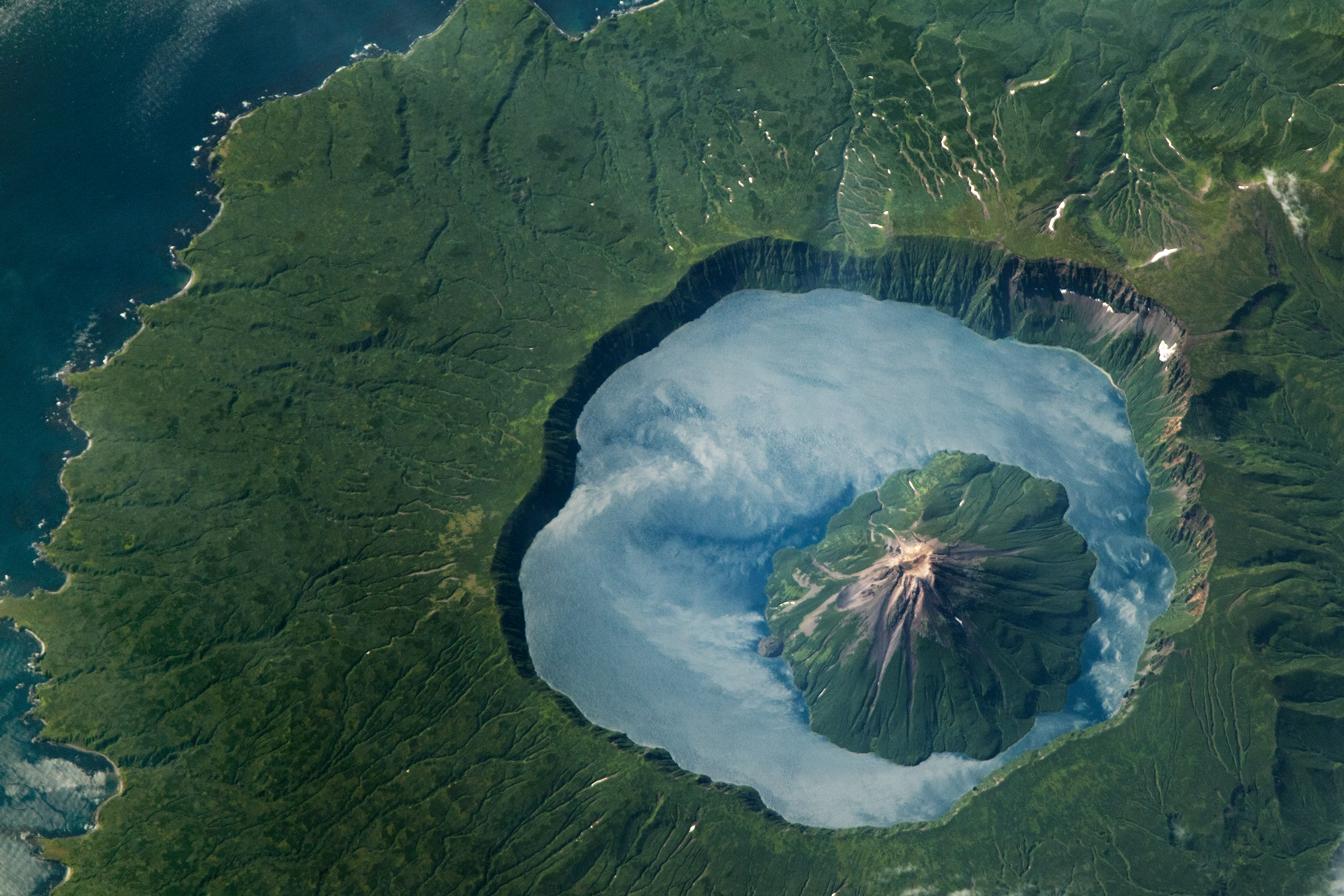
Astronaut photograph from International Space Station

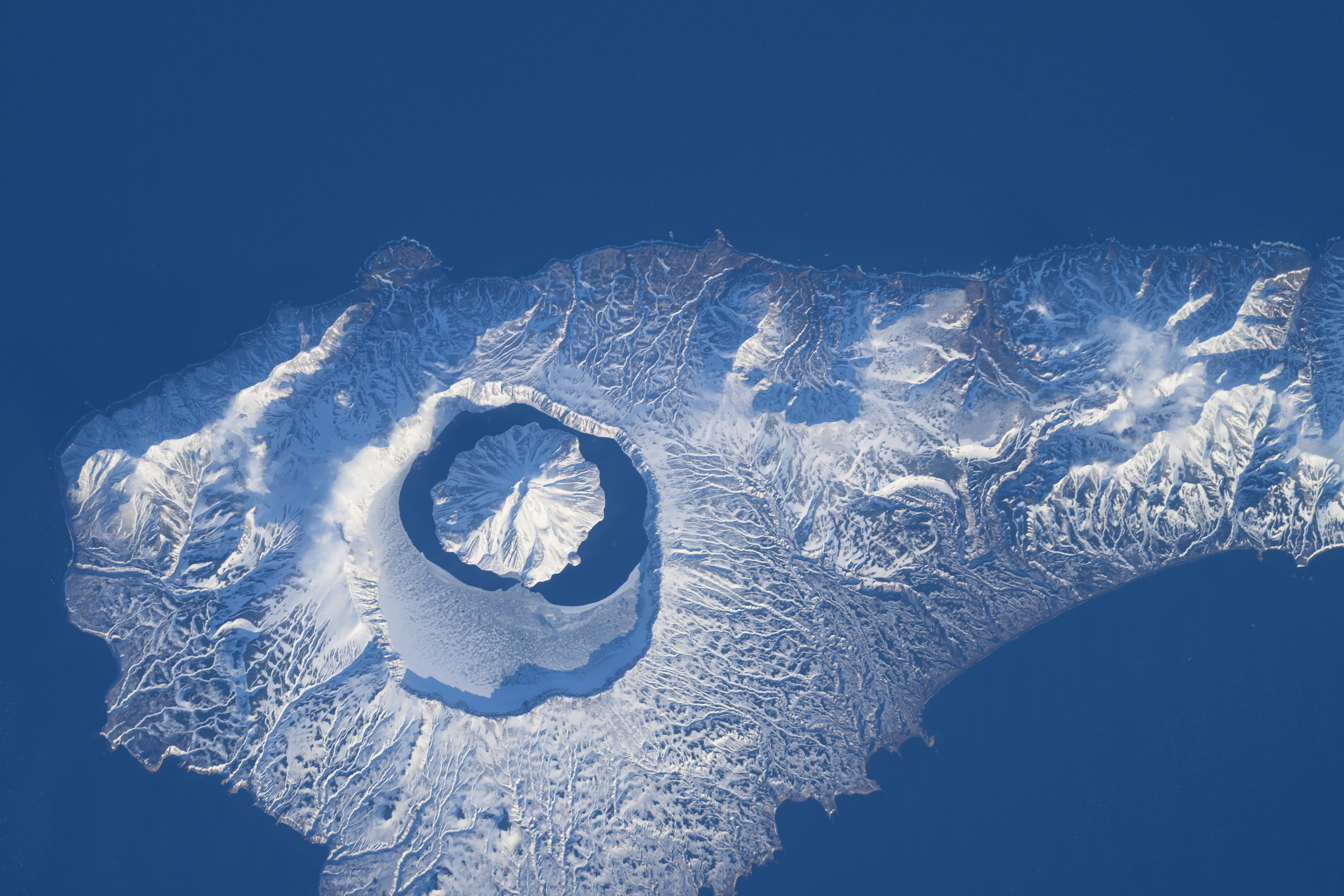
Photo from ISS in late April, with Kol'tsevoe Lake partially frozen
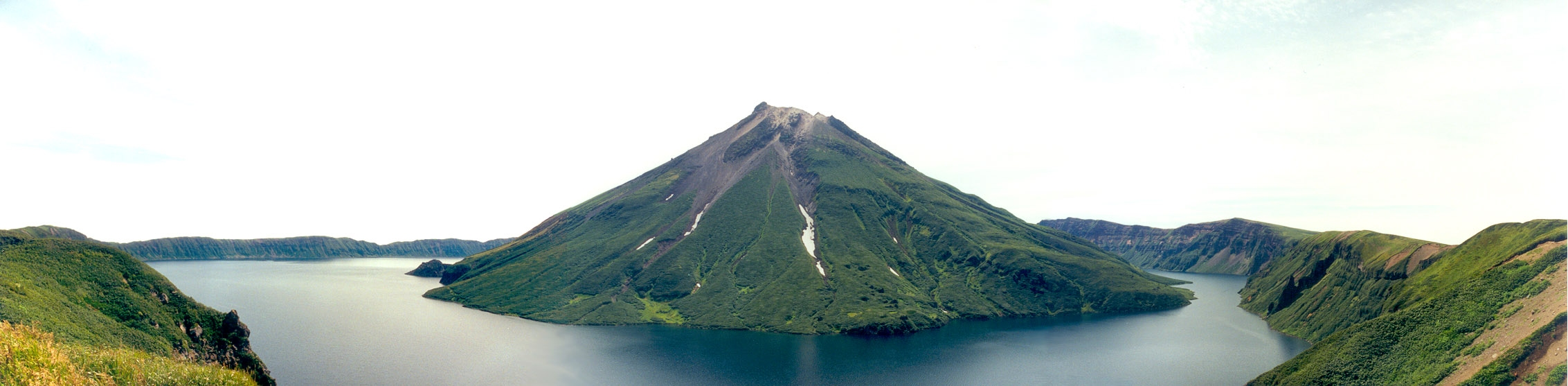
View of Krenitsyn Peak from the rim of Tao-Rusyr Caldera

== See also ==
- List of volcanoes in Russia
