= Nemo (French band) =

French progressive rock band

- Origin: Le Puy-en-Velay, Haute-Loire
- Genres: Progressive rock
- Years active: 1999–present
- Labels: Quadrifonic
- Members: Jean-Pierre Louveton; Guillaume Fountaine; Jean Baptiste Itier; Lionel B. Guichard
- Past members: Benoit Gaignon; Pascal Bertrand
- Website: www.nemo-world.com

Nemo is a French progressive rock band based in Le Puy-en-Velay, Haute-Loire.

The band was founded by Jean Pierre Louveton (guitars, bass, vocals), Guillaume Fontaine (keyboards) and Pascal Bertrand (drums, percussion, marimba). It was initially influenced by Genesis and Ange.

== Discography ==
=== Albums ===
- 2002: Les nouveaux mondes
- 2003: Présages
- 2004: Prélude à la Ruine
- 2006: Si Partie I
- 2007: Si Partie II - L'Homme Idéal
- 2009: Barbares
- 2011: R€volu$ion
- 2013: Le ver dans le fruit (Double CD)
- 2015: Coma

=== Live albums ===
- 2005: Immersion Publique
- 2009: Si live
- 2010: La Machine à Remonter les Temps (DVD + 2 CD)

=== Singles ===
- 2004: Eve et le génie du mal
- 2007: Les enfants rois
