= NIMO (non-interfering multiple output) =

Non-interfering multiple output

An approach of an antenna and beamforming system, NIMO (non-interfering multiple output), is introduced that can be used to overcome bandwidth and capacity limitations on dense wireless networks. The new system combines beamforming technology with MIMO, providing a higher quality of service (QoS), and supports transparent integration with any telecommunication system. NIMO provides multiple narrow beams using a single antenna, and provides improved characteristics compared to conventional beamforming techniques such as reduced interference. Such a multi-beam antenna system increases spectral efficiency, user capacity, and throughput, as well as QoS.
