= Nemo Peak =

Mountain in Russia

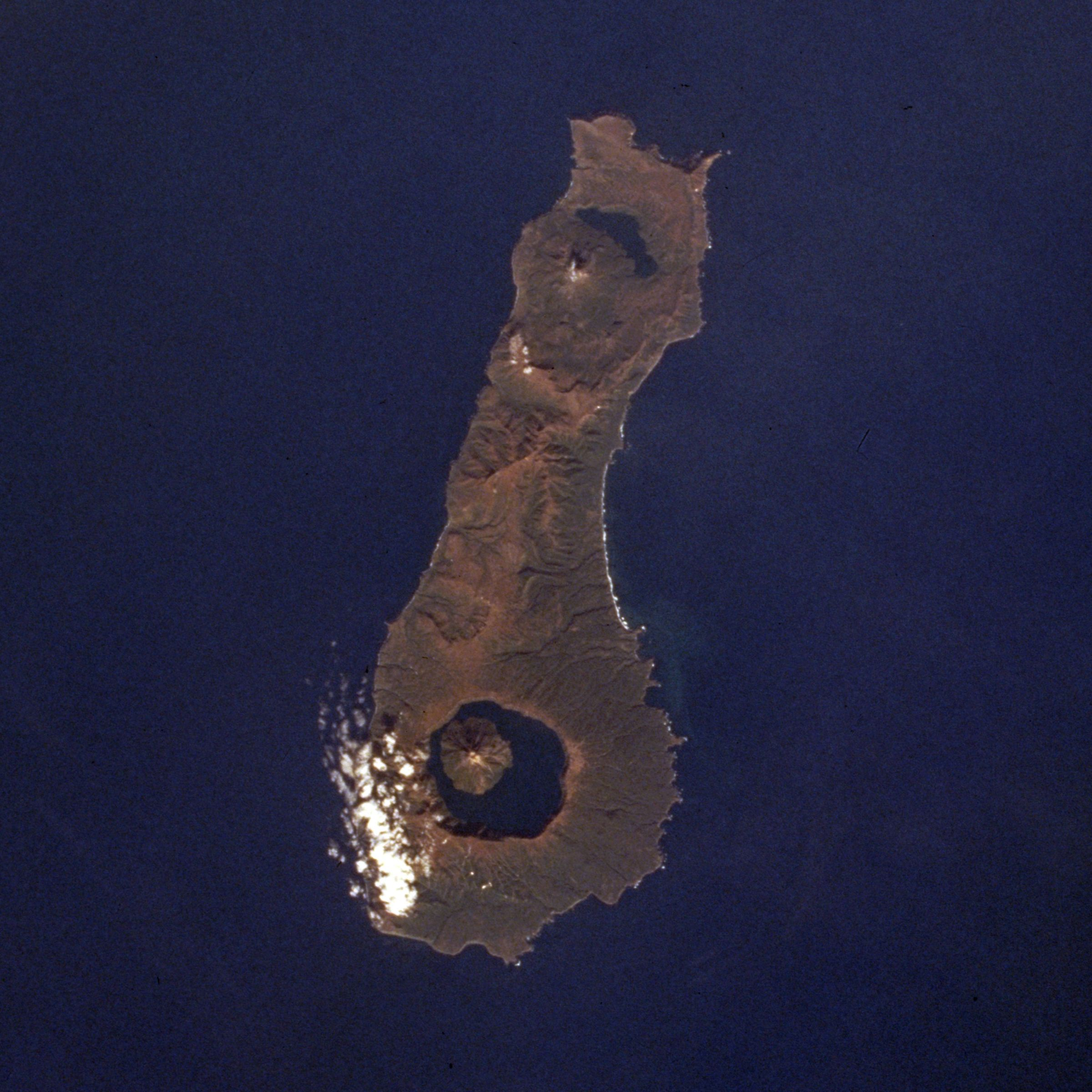
- Onekotan Island, with Nemo Peak at top (north) and Tao-Rusyr Caldera at bottom.

Highest point
- Elevation: 1,018 m (3,340 ft)
- Coordinates: 49.57°N 154.808°E

Geography
- Location within Far Eastern Federal District
- Location: Onekotan, Kuril Islands, Russia

Geology
- Mountain type: Stratovolcano / Caldera
- Last eruption: August 1938

Climbing
- First ascent: ?
- Easiest route: ?

Nemo Peak (Russian: Пик Немо; Japanese 根茂山; Nemoyama) is a stratovolcano located at the northern end of Onekotan Island, Kuril Islands, Russia. It is truncated by two nested calderas, with the cone of Nemo Peak itself rising in the southwest end of the youngest caldera and a crater lake partially filling the northeast part, named Ozero Chernoye.

== Geography ==
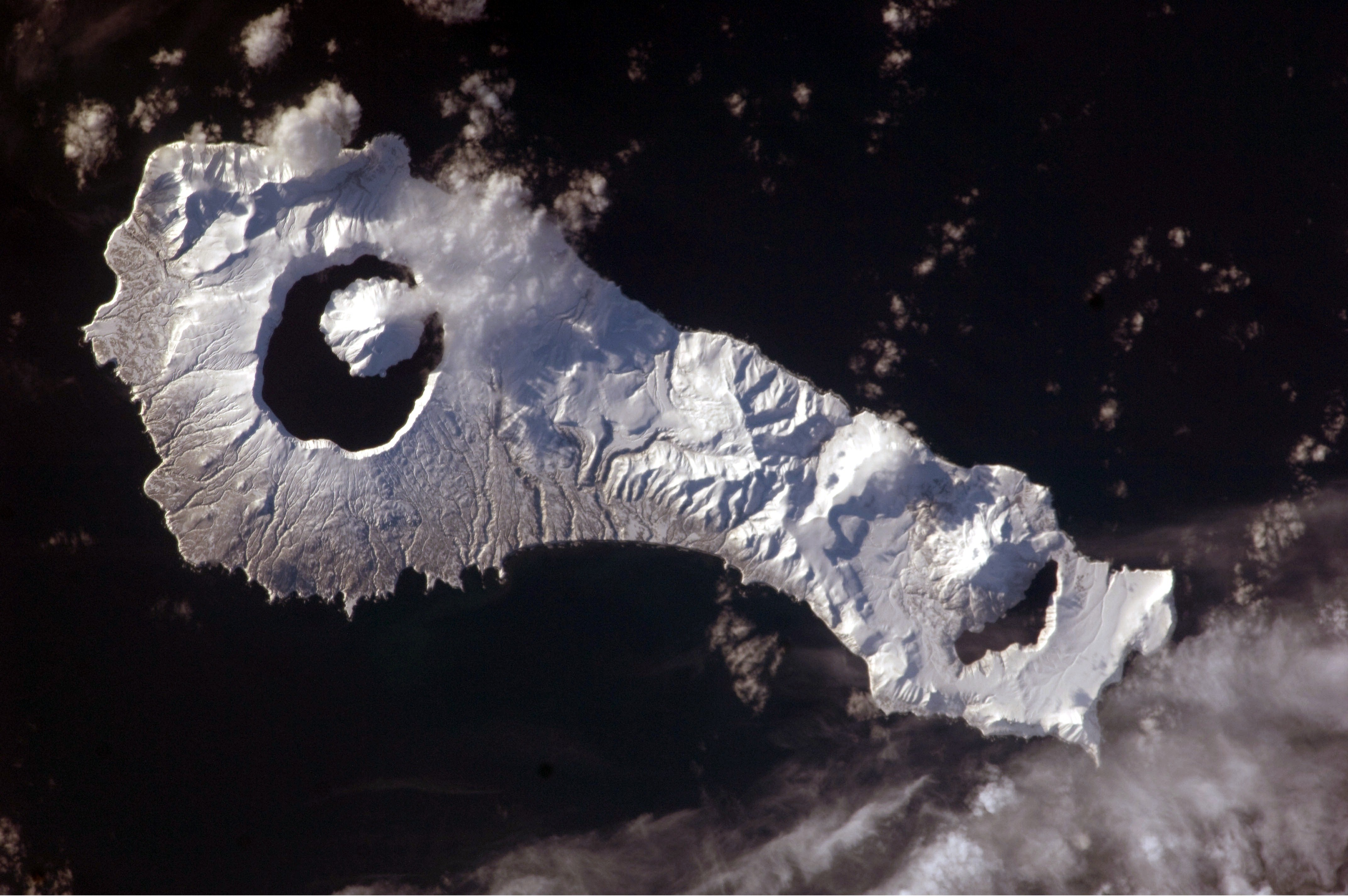
Astronaut photograph of Onekotan from the International Space Station, with Nemo Peak at right (north)

Nemo Peak lies on Onekotan Island, in the Kuril Islands. Nemo Peak lies on the northern end of the island; the southern end is occupied by Tao-Rusyr Caldera. These two volcanoes together have erupted about 120–130 cubic kilometres (29–31 cu mi) of tephra, covering the entire seafloor of the Sea of Okhotsk.

== Geology ==
Nemo Peak has formed several calderas. Two older ones reach diameters of 11 kilometres (6.8 mi) and overlap each other, with an average elevation of the floor of 50–100 metres (160–330 ft). The Sovetskii ridge limits these calderas to the east. A pre-Nemo volcano is known as Mednyi. Glacial erosion has affected the older volcanic centres. Ignimbrites fill these calderas.

Within this caldera lies a stratovolcano with a smaller 5 kilometres (3.1 mi) wide caldera; Nemo Peak proper is located within this smaller caldera. This forms a somma volcano. In the north-northeastern part of this caldera, Black Lake can be found, also known as Chernoe. The caldera opens towards the Sea of Okhotsk.

Evidence indicates that Nemo Peak proper contains a southwestern crater filled with the present-day cone and crater, which is in turn filled by a lava dome. A smaller cone on the northwestern side of Nemo Peak was destroyed by an explosion. Lava flows extend down from the summit area of Nemo Peak and are covered with scoria.

The complex is surrounded by older rocks, some of Tertiary age. To the south the complex borders the old Tao-Rusyr and Shestakov volcanic rocks. Another volcano named Asyrmintar is found on the northeastern margin of the two older calderas; Asyrmintar is an eroded remnant.

== Petrology ==
Nemo is an andesitic volcano. Basaltic andesite and dacite have been found as well.

Augite, hypersthene, labradorite, olivine and pyroxene are minerals found in Nemo lavas.

== Eruptive history ==
Nemo Peak is one of the most active volcanoes in the Kurils and has been the site of catastrophic eruptions for 300,000 years, going back to the Pleistocene. Such large eruptions released large amounts of pyroclastics. Old eruptions occurred 199,000 - 200,000 years ago. Detailed eruption histories however are poorly established.

The older Nemo calderas appear to predate the last glaciation, while the younger one is post-glacial in age. Nemo I formed 40,000 - 45,000 years ago and Nemo III 25,000 - 24,500 or 26,000 years ago; a radiocarbon date of 24,500 ± 740 years ago has been obtained on it. Nemo Peak proper formed about 9,050 ± 100 or 9,130 ± 140 radiocarbon years ago.

Holocene volcanic activity includes the emission of tephra and lava flows with eruptions every 1,400 - 1,200 years since 3,800 years before present. The growth of a lava dome over the last 600 years was accompanied by phreatic activity. Tephrochronology suggests the occurrence of eruptions 1,350, 750 AD, 550 ± 100 BC, 1,850 BC, 3,050 BC, 5,550 BC, 7,050 BC and 7,550 BC.

Nemo Peak is a dormant volcano. It was the site of volcanic unrest in the 1700s, 1938 and 1906. This last eruption may be associated with the formation of a lava dome. The summit area features solfataric activity, which occurs on a bench in the summit lava dome. Future volcanic activity involving medium-sized or large eruptions is possible; tephra would be propagated east-northeast.

=== Tephras ===
Nemo Peak appears to be the source of several tephra layers found in the Sea of Okhotsk named K2 and K3. These tephras extend up to 800 square kilometres (310 sq mi) away from Onekotan Island but their locations do not overlap: K2 tephras extend northwestward away from Onekotan and pyroxenes crystallized under different conditions. The volume of the K2 tephra has been estimated at 9 cubic kilometres (2.2 cu mi). This tephra is of rhyolitic composition.

It is not clear if they come from different phases of the same eruption or different ones, but they certainly are different tephras given their different distribution. Potentially, K3 was formed by the caldera-forming eruption of Nemo II and K2 by eruptions of Nemo III. An alternative proposal attributes K3 to the Nemo I caldera.

== See also ==
- List of volcanoes in Russia
