= John Nimmo =

John Nimmo may refer to:

- John Nimmo (cricketer) (1910–1994), New Zealand cricketer
- John Nimmo (judge) (1909–1997), Australian judge
- John Nimmo (politician) (1819–1904), Australian politician
