= Nemo Cove =

Cove on Pourquoi Pas Island, Antarctica

Nemo Cove (67°43′S 67°18′W) is a cove midway along the east side of Pourquoi Pas Island, off the west coast of Graham Land. First surveyed in 1936 by the British Graham Land Expedition (BGLE) under Rymill. Resurveyed in 1948 by the Falkland Islands Dependencies Survey (FIDS) and named after Captain Nemo, designer and captain of the submarine Nautilus in Jules Verne's 1870 novel Twenty Thousand Leagues Under the Seas. Other features on the island are also named after characters in this book.
