= Red Cross of Cape Verde =

- Founded: 1984
- Type: Non-profit organisation
- Purpose: Humanitarian Aid
- Location: Cape Verde
- Affiliations: International Committee of the Red Cross; International Federation of Red Cross and Red Crescent Societies

Red Cross of Cape Verde (Portuguese: Cruz Vermelha de Cabo Verde), abbreviated CVCV, was founded in 1984. It has its headquarters on Avenida Andrade Corvo in Praia, Cape Verde.
