= National Emergency Management Organization (Belize) =

Agency overview
- Formed: 1 February 1999
- Jurisdiction: Belize
- Agency executive: Daniel Mendez, National Emergency Coordinator

The National Emergency Management Organization (NEMO) is a Belizean national agency to coordinate the national response towards hurricanes and floods.

== Organization ==
NEMO receives 250,000 Belize dollars from the Ministry of Finance. In the instance of a natural disaster, NEMO would apply for an allocation from the Ministry of Finance. Leadership in NEMO lies in the Cabinet and Prime Minister of Belize.

== History ==
NEMO was established as a result of the Disaster Preparedness and Response Act in response to the devastation caused by Hurricane Mitch.

In 2024, NEMO received part of a $1.26 million USD grant from the Caribbean Development Bank allowing the organization increase capacity.

On 5 March 2025, NEMO opened a new office in Belmopan.
