= Downtown Oklahoma City =

Neighborhoods of Oklahoma City, Oklahoma, US

- Neighborhoods of Oklahoma City
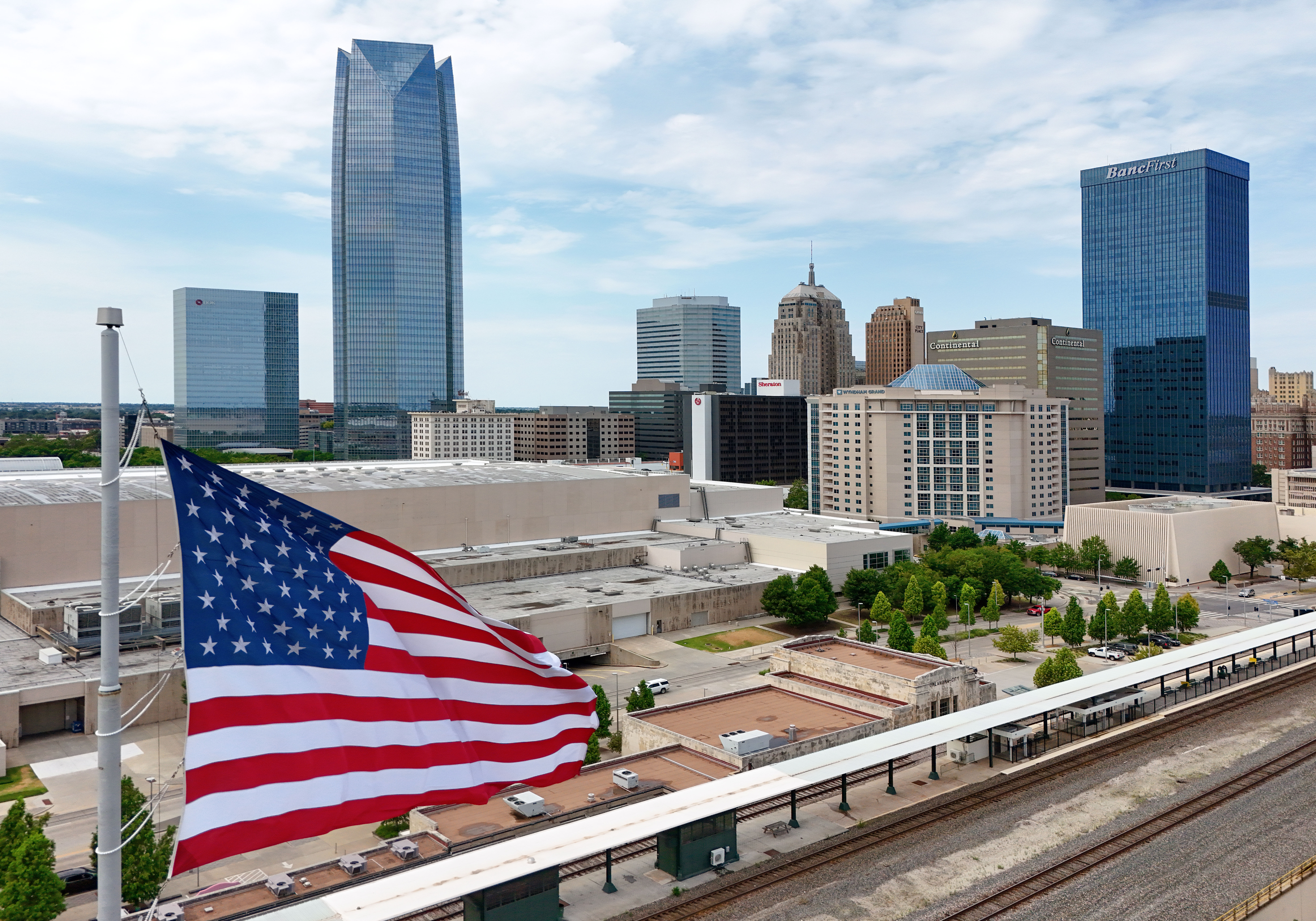
- Oklahoma City skyline as seen from above the Santa Fe Depot
- Nicknames: OKC, downtown
- Country: United States
- State: Oklahoma
- Counties: Oklahoma
- City: Oklahoma City

Area
  - Land: 1.88 sq mi (4.9 km^{2})
- Elevation: 1,200 ft (370 m)

Population (2020)
  - Total: 7,933
  - Density: 4,219.7/sq mi (1,629.2/km^{2})
- ZIP code: 73102, 73103*, 73104*, 73106*, 73109*, 73129*
- Area code: 405
- Website: http://www.downtownokc.com

Downtown Oklahoma City is located at the geographic center of the Oklahoma City metropolitan area and contains the principal, central business district of the region. Downtown has over 80,000 workers and over 13,310,000 sq ft (1,237,000 m^{2}) of leasable office space to-date. Downtown Oklahoma City is the legal, financial, economic, nightlife, and entertainment center of the region.

Downtown Oklahoma City consists of several urban districts that ring the Central Business District; including the retail oriented A-Alley, the Arts District, the Bricktown Entertainment District, the Deep Deuce residential neighborhood, and the Flatiron District. Unofficial/new areas of downtown OKC include "Lower Bricktown", MidTown urban neighborhood, SOSA (South of Saint Anthony 'hospital'), WestTown, Film Row urban district, Farmer's Market, and the new Downtown South "Core-2-Shore" neighborhoods.

Much of downtown Oklahoma City's six districts are overlaid with the Downtown OKC Business Improvement District.

== History ==
Downtown Oklahoma City is the location of the founding of the city when the area was opened for settlement in the Land Rush of 1889.

Beginning in the 1960s, downtown Oklahoma City underwent a major urban renewal initiative known as the Pei Plan. Over 500 buildings were demolished as a result.

== Districts ==
Downtown Oklahoma City is divided into six districts.

=== Automobile Alley ===
Automobile Alley is located along Broadway just north of City Center. The district historically was home to many of the city's car dealerships of the early 20th century. Automobile Alley now hosts shops and restaurants. Automobile Alley covers .025 square miles with a population of 713 as of the 2020 United States census, a density of 2,852/square mile.

=== Bricktown ===
Bricktown is an entertainment district located just east of City Center. Initially founded as a warehouse district, Bricktown is now home to hotels, clubs, restaurants, residences, and offices. Bricktown has 329 residents within its 0.27 square miles, a density of 1,219/square mile.

=== City Center ===
City Center is the primary central business district and contains a large concentration of office space and the city's tallest buildings. 2,583 residents live within City Center's 0.53 square miles, a density of 4,874/square mile.

=== Deep Deuce ===
Deep Deuce is a residential district located to the north of Bricktown and east of City Center. Centered on NE 2nd Avenue, Deep Deuce was the hub of black culture and commerce. Apartments and condos now make up a majority of the district with a population of 1,384 inside an area of 0.11 square miles for a density of 12,582/square mile.

=== Midtown ===
Midtown Oklahoma City is located to the north of City Center. Midtown is a mixed-use district home to many restaurants, shops, offices, nightlife, housing, hotels, and medical facilities such as St. Anthony Hospital. Midtown has a population of 2,040 within the district's 0.54 square miles, for a density of 3,778/square mile.

=== West Village ===
West Village is centered on West Main Street and West Sheridan Avenue, just west of City Center. The district is home to the headquarters of the Oklahoma City Police Department. West Village covers an area of 0.16 square miles and has a population of 884, a density of 5,525/square mile.

== Attractions ==
- Artspace at Untitled
- Automobile Alley Historic District
- BC Clark Jewelers, Oklahoma's oldest jeweler (founded in 1892)
- Bricktown
  - Academy of Contemporary Music at University of Central Oklahoma
  - American Banjo Museum
  - Bass Pro Shops
  - Bricktown Canal Riverwalk
  - Bricktown Fountain
  - Bricktown Riverwalk Park
  - Chickasaw Bricktown Ballpark
  - Harkins Theatres
  - Centennial Land Run Monument
- Campbell Art Park
- Central Park (Union Park), to be developed in the Core-2-Shore/Downtown South
- Century Center
- Deep Deuce (original black downtown currently gentrified as an urban residential district)
- Individual Artists of Oklahoma Gallery
- Kerr Park
- Midtown Oklahoma City
- Myriad Botanical Gardens and Crystal Bridge Conservatory
- Oklahoma City 89'Er Museum Park
- Oklahoma City Civic Center
  - Bicentennial Park
  - City Hall
  - Civic Center Music Hall
  - Hightower Park
  - Oklahoma City Museum of Art
- Oklahoma City National Memorial
- Oklahoma Contemporary Arts Center (formerly City Arts Center)
- Oklahoma River
  - RiverSport (formerly Boathouse) District
  - Finish Line Tower
- Paycom Center
- Plaza Court
- Rocktown Climbing Gym
- Scissortail Park
- Skydance Bridge
- Triangle District
- The Underground
- WestTown
- The Womb

== Downtown living ==
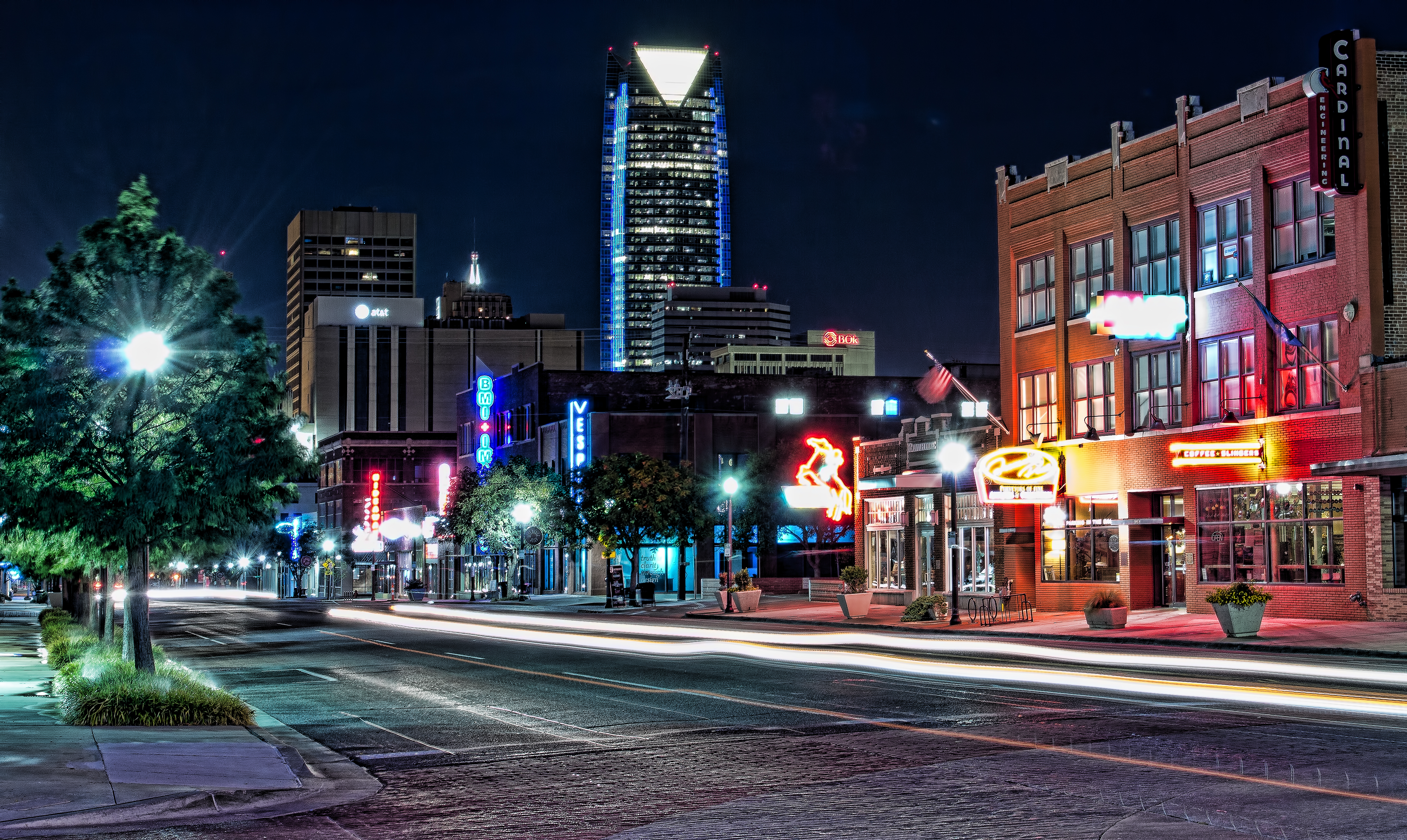
Automobile Alley district

Since the mid-1990s, residential housing has made a significant rebound in downtown Oklahoma City as numerous projects have been completed with many more proposed or are currently in development in each district. Examples of the various residential communities available today include:

- City Place Tower, the Penthouses
- Park Harvey Place
- Civic
- Steelyard
- LIFT
- The Frank
- Edge @ MidTown
- Metropolitan
- Block 42
- The Brownstones at Maywood Park
- Central Avenue Villas
- Centennial on the Canal
- The Lofts at Maywood Park
- Deep Deuce Apartment blocks
- The Hill
- Avana
- The Montgomery
- Regency Tower
- Seiber Motor Hotel Residences
- Sycamore Square Apartment Homes
- SoSA neighborhood upscale modern residences

== Architecture ==
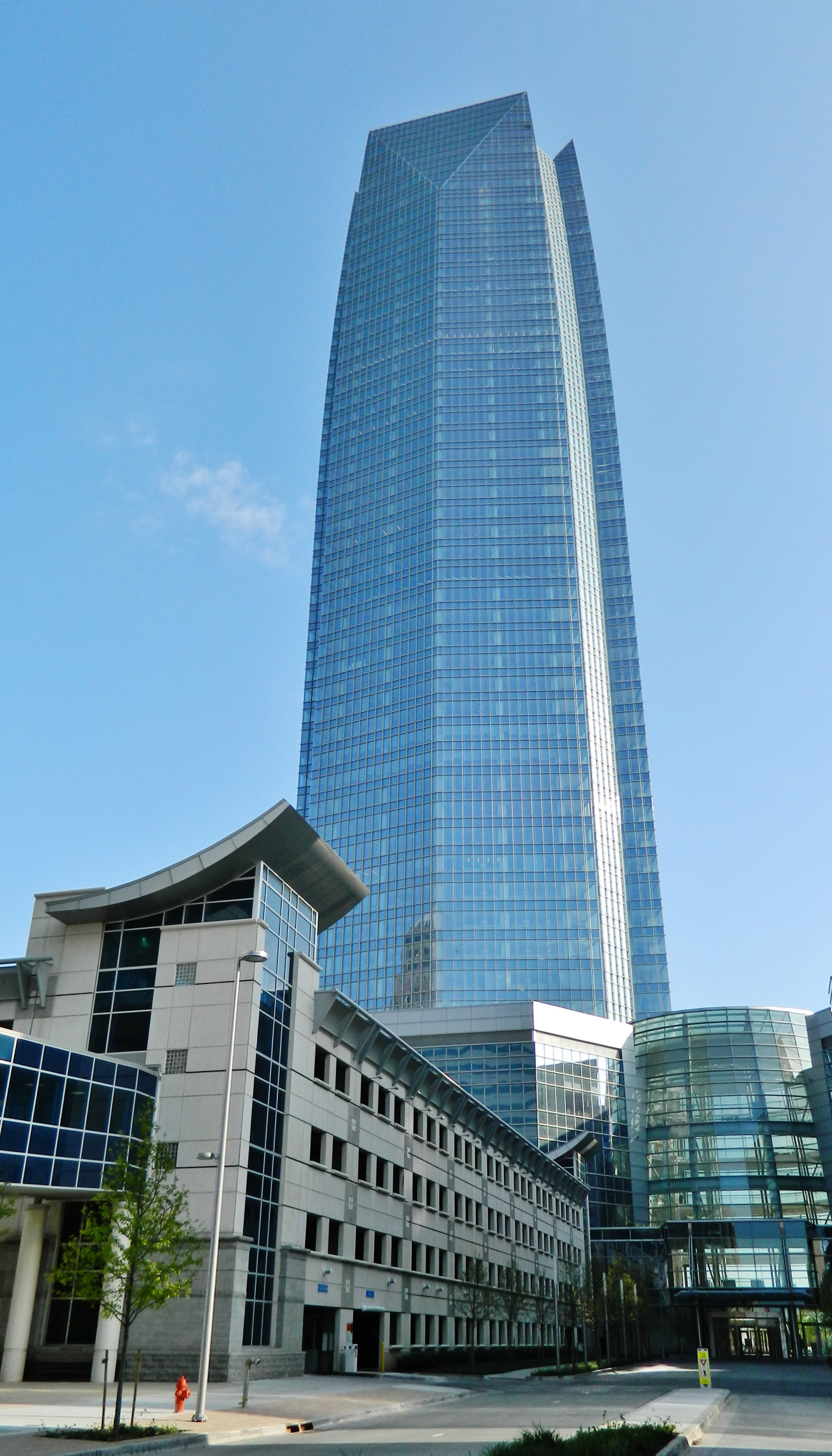
Devon Tower, Oklahoma's tallest.

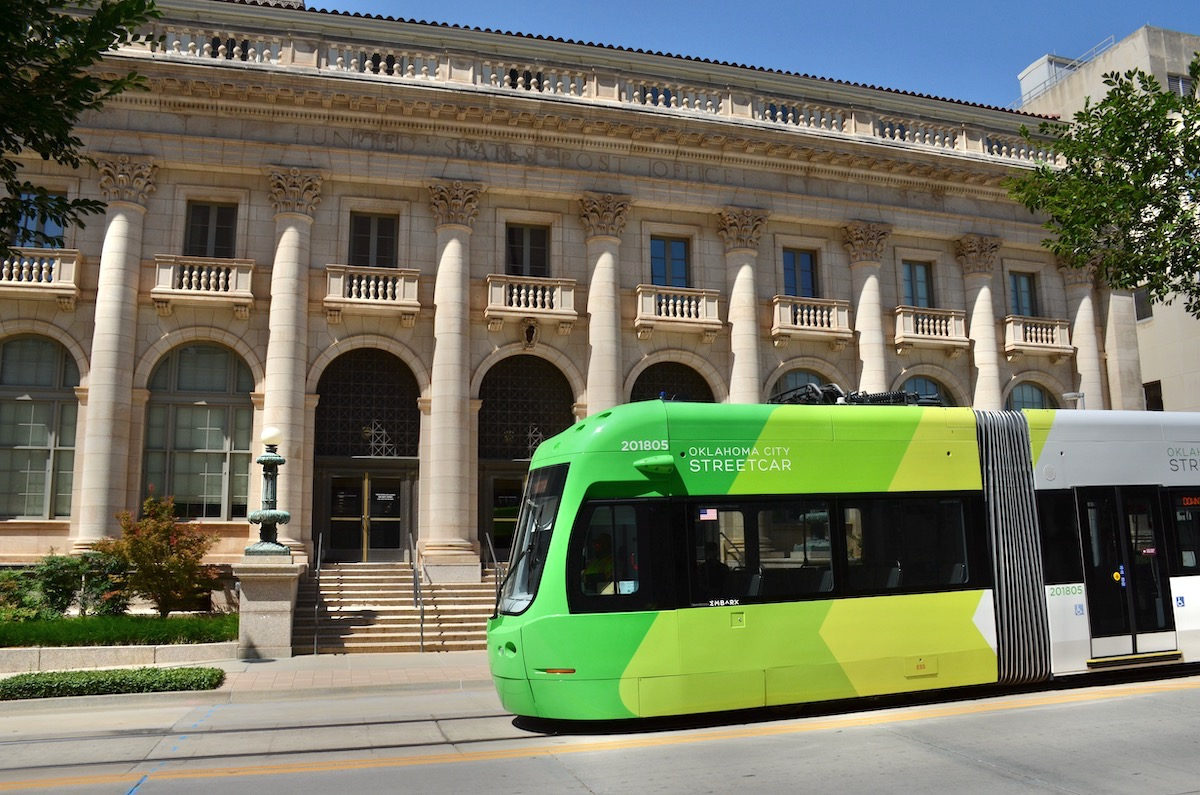
OKC Streetcar passing the historic U.S. Post Office and Courthouse Building

- BOK Park Plaza
- Central High School, now Oklahoma City University Law School
- Chase Tower, including the renowned Petroleum Club on top floors
- City Place Tower
- Civic Center Music Hall – the city's premier performing arts and auditory performance hall
- Colcord Hotel, the city's first skyscraper
- Devon Energy Center – Oklahoma's tallest skyscraper
- Federal Reserve Bank
- First Baptist Church, cathedral
- First Lutheran Church, cathedral
- First National Center
- Kerr-McGee Tower (now SandRidge Energy headquarters)
- Leadership Square, the city's largest leasable class A office complex
- Littlepage Building-National Historic Site
- Mid America Tower (Continental headquarters)
- Oklahoma City Amtrak, Santa-Fe Depot (Intermodal Transit Center)
- Oklahoma City Federal Building
- Oklahoma City Museum of Art
- Oklahoma City National Memorial
- Oklahoma Tower
- Paycom Center, home of the NBA's Oklahoma City Thunder
- Petroleum Building
- Renaissance Hotel
- Ronald J. Norick Downtown Library
- Saint Anthony Hospital campus
- Saint Joseph's Old Cathedral
- Saint Paul's Episcopal Cathedral
- Sheraton Hotel
- Skirvin Hilton Hotel
- Union Bus Station, demolished
- Union Station
- U.S. Post Office, Courthouse, and Federal Office Building, on the National Register of Historic Places

== Transportation ==
Downtown Oklahoma City is serviced by Embark, the city's public transit agency that operates city buses and the Oklahoma City Streetcar. 21 bus routes converge at the Downtown Transit Center, which had over 2,000 daily boardings in 2019. The streetcar has two routes, the downtown loop at 4.8 miles in length, and the Bricktown loop at 2 miles. Both streetcar loops are wholly contained to downtown.

The Santa Fe Depot is a train station located in City Center and services Amtrak's Heartland Flyer inter-city rail. The Heartland Flyer makes a daily round-trip from Oklahoma City to Fort Worth, Texas.

Six highway routes meet near downtown Oklahoma City at an interchange locally known as the Dallas Junction: I-35, I-40, I-235, US 62, US 77, and US 270.

== Parks and recreation ==
Several parks and public spaces are located in downtown Oklahoma City:

- Bricktown Canal
- Bicentennial Park
- Campbell Art Park
- Hightower Park
- Kerr Park
- Myriad Botanical Gardens
- Oklahoma City National Memorial
- Red Andrews Park
- Scissortail Park

== Notable residents ==
- Mick Cornett - former Mayor of Oklahoma City
- J. Clifford Hudson - Chairman, President, and CEO of Sonic Drive-In
