= St. Anthony Hospital (Oklahoma City) =

Coordinates: 35°28′40.31″N 97°31′24.39″W

- SSM Health

Geography
- Location: Midtown, Oklahoma City, Oklahoma, United States

Organization
- Care system: Private
- Type: General

Services
- Emergency department: Yes
- Beds: 773

History
- Founded: 1894

Links
- Website: www.saintsnearyou.com
- Lists: Hospitals in Oklahoma

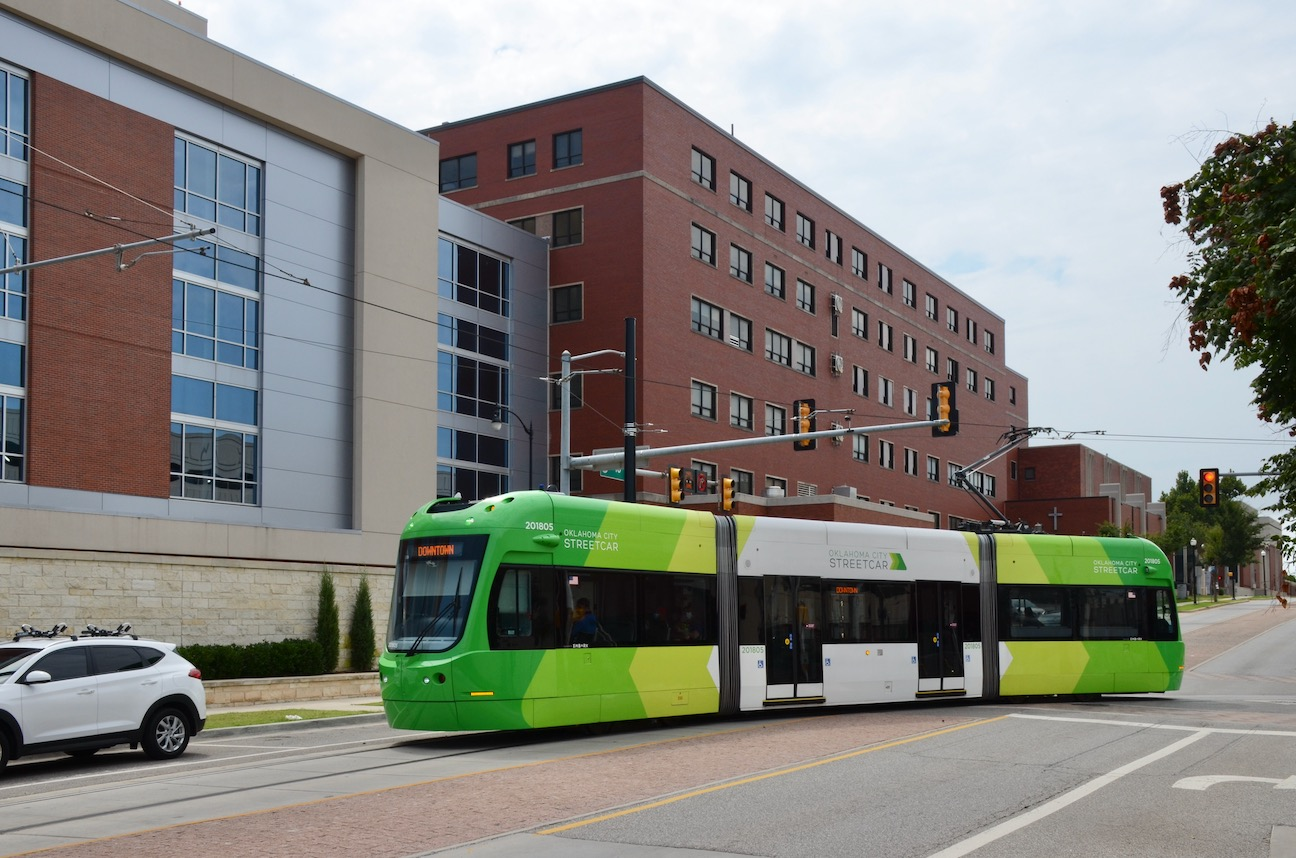
The 2018-opened Oklahoma City Streetcar system serves the hospital.

St. Anthony Hospital is a large general hospital located in downtown Oklahoma City, Oklahoma, United States. It is the oldest hospital in the state and one of 19 operated by SSM Health, a not-for-profit Roman Catholic care provider. St. Anthony Hospital is home to medical and surgical programs providing general acute care services including: cardiology, oncology, neurology, behavioral medicine, surgery, kidney transplantation and other services. An advanced structural heart disease program is offered at the affiliated Saints Heart and Vascular Institute.

== History ==
St. Anthony Hospital was founded in 1898 by the Sisters of St. Francis who, from their base in Maryville, Missouri, set out to fund their local hospital. When they arrived in Oklahoma City they approached the pastor of St. Joseph's Catholic Church to petition the congregation.

The Sisters were approved to raise funds with the condition that any money raised would go towards opening a hospital in Oklahoma City since the newly established and rapidly growing Oklahoma Territory did not have a hospital and its citizens were dying from lack of care. The Sisters agreed, and on August 1, 1898, they opened St. Anthony Hospital in a small house that had twelve beds.

In 1899, the Sisters moved St. Anthony Hospital to a larger facility with twenty-five patient rooms just outside city limits, where the hospital remains today.

== Redevelopment ==
St Anthony renewed its commitment to Midtown by announcing a 10-year, $220 million expansion and renovation. The redevelopment project includes a new education center, cardiac emergency department, renovation of the Center for Behavioral Medicine, and many other facility and service enhancements that benefit patients and the inner city community.

The Saints Pavilion, which represents one of the pivotal milestones of the renewed campus and commitment to Midtown, was completed in 2003. The final phase of the project is scheduled to open in 2016.
