= Bricktown Beach =

Artificial beach in Oklahoma City, Oklahoma, U.S.

- Artificial beach
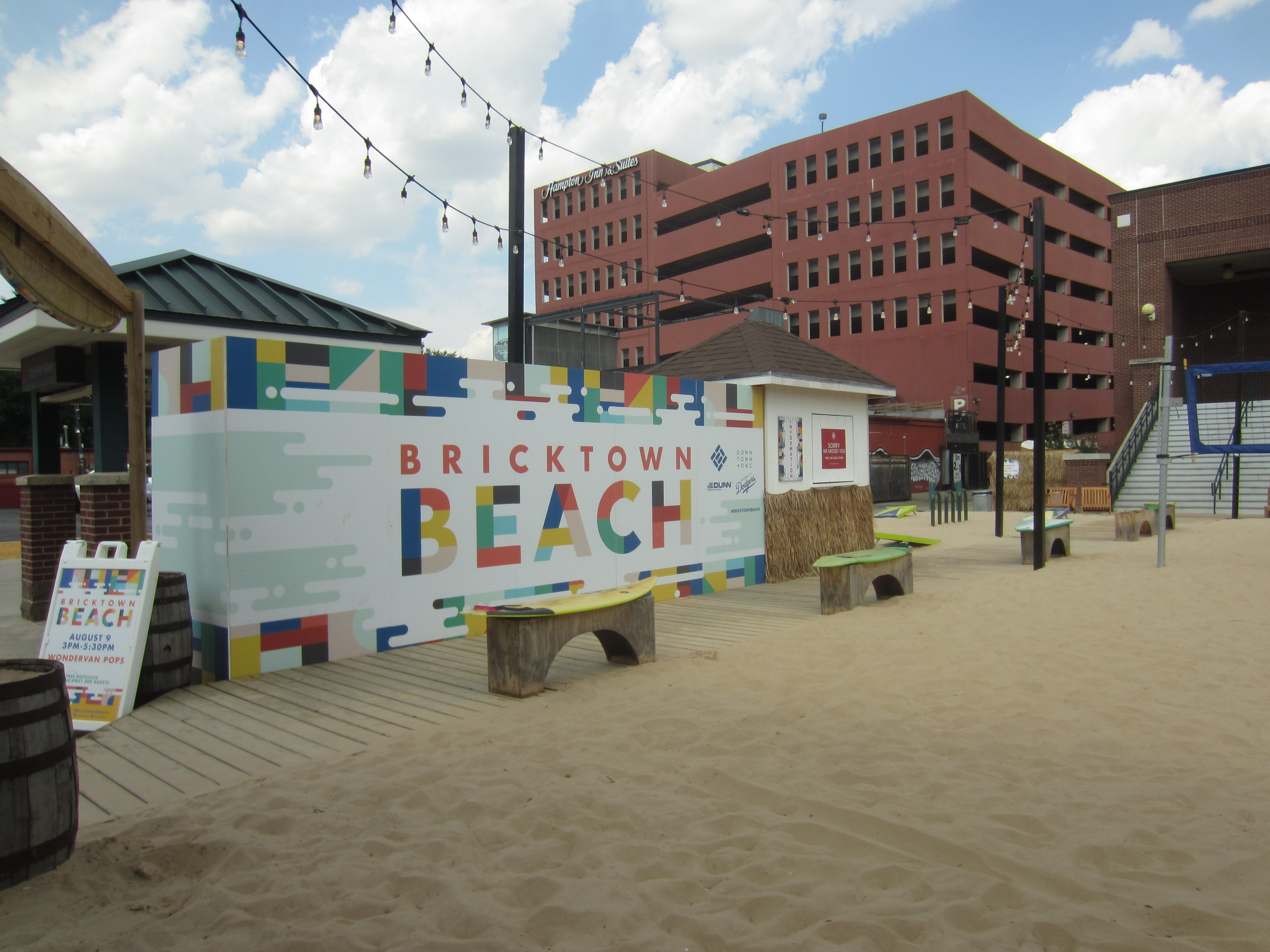
- Bricktown Beach in 2019

- Coordinates: 35°27′56″N 97°30′32″W
- Location: Bricktown, Oklahoma City
- Age: 2016
- Formed by: Manmade

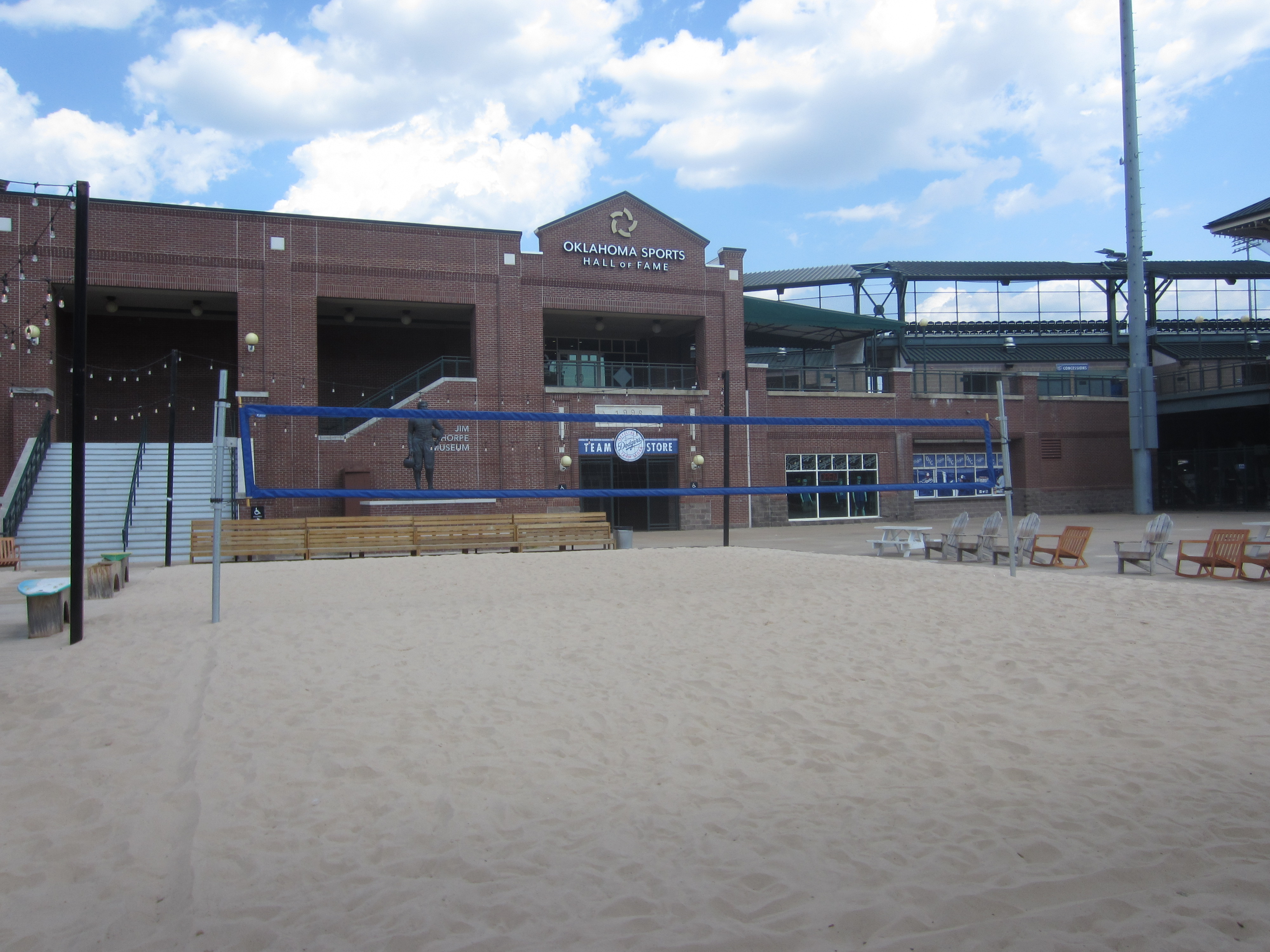
Volleyball area with the Jim Thorpe Museum and Oklahoma Sports Hall of Fame in the background, 2019

Bricktown Beach was an artificial beach temporarily installed annually in Bricktown, Oklahoma City, in the U.S. state of Oklahoma until its closure in 2020. The summer attraction, which featured beach sand, lounge chairs and umbrellas, and equipment for volleyball and other games, was installed at Third Base Plaza outside Chickasaw Bricktown Ballpark. Approximately 150 tons of sand is used to create the beach each year. The beach was first installed in 2016.

== History ==
The beach was first installed in 2016, and the concept was conceived after staff members of Bricktown Inc. and Downtown OKC visited Detroit. The beach cost approximately $20,000 and J.E. Dunn Construction offered construction services at no cost.

The beach hosted a volleyball tournament and screening of the film Angels in the Outfield in 2017. The 2017 beach was sponsored by the City of Oklahoma City, Downtown Business Improvement District, JE Dunn Construction Group, and the Oklahoma City Dodgers.

The 2018 edition added a "Beach Hut" staffed by Downtown Guides for distributing equipment and helping visitors. The 2019 beach was sponsored by Downtown Oklahoma City Partnership and the Bricktown Association and built by JE Dunn Construction Group.
