= Magnolia Petroleum Building (Oklahoma City) =

Historic building in Oklahoma, United States

- U.S. National Register of Historic Places
- U.S. Historic district – Contributing property
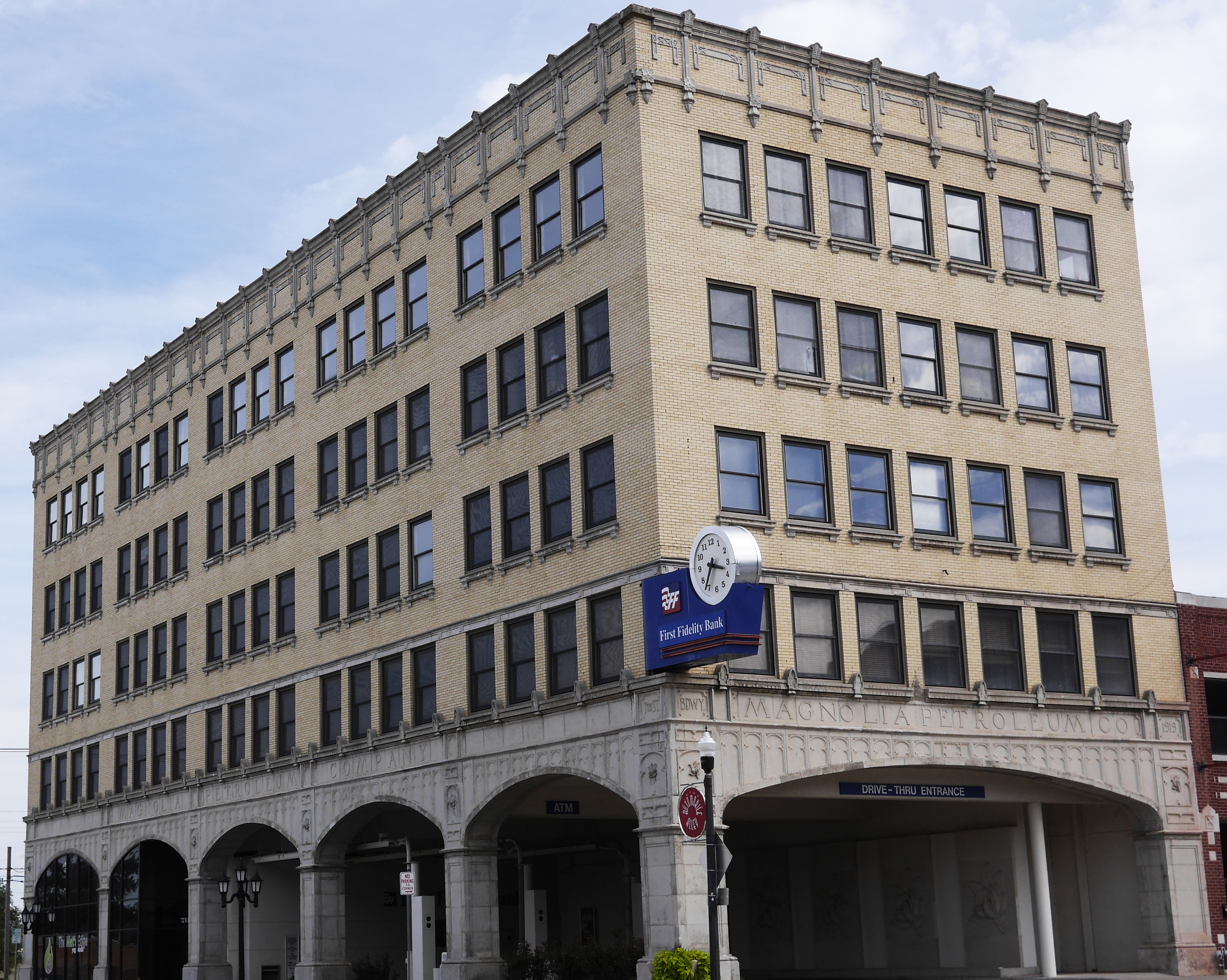

- Location within Oklahoma Location within the United States
- Location: 722 N. Broadway St., Oklahoma City, Oklahoma, US
- Coordinates: 35°28′29″N 97°30′49″W
- Area: 1 acre (0.40 ha)
- Built: 1920
- Architect: Hawk & Parr
- Architectural style: Late 19th And Early 20th Century American Movements, Sullivanesque
- Part of: Automobile Alley Historic District (ID99000351)
- NRHP reference No.: 79002007
- Added to NRHP: October 4, 1979

The Magnolia Petroleum Building is a historic commercial building at 722 North Broadway Avenue in the Automobile Alley district of Oklahoma City, Oklahoma, United States. The five-story building was designed by architectural firm Hawk & Parr and constructed in 1920. It has a ground-floor automobile service station with offices above. It is listed on the National Register of Historic Places.

== Description ==
The Magnolia Petroleum Building is located at 722 North Broadway Avenue in Oklahoma City, Oklahoma, United States, at the intersection with NW 7th Street. It sits within the boundaries of the Automobile Alley Historic District, a National Register of Historic Places (NRHP) district. The building is five stories tall. Designed by architectural firm Hawk & Parr and completed in 1920, it is one of their few remaining structures. The building has a ground-floor automobile service station with offices above; the service station was the largest of seven that Magnolia Petroleum operated in Oklahoma City.

The building is designed in the Sullivanesque style and was one of Oklahoma City's last buildings constructed in that style. It is made of reinforced concrete, with an eave made of limestone. Columns and pilasters are oriented vertically, and spandrels, glass bricks, and bands of ornamental limestones and windows extend horizontally across the facade. The windows themselves are vertically oriented. The north and west elevations of the facade have blond brick, along with embossed inscriptions, arches, and cornice decoration all made of limestone. The eastern elevation has darker brick partially hidden by a fire escape, and the southern elevation is clad with stucco.

Inside, the building has 37,713 square feet (3,503.7 m^{2}) of space. The first story was originally the service station. After 1961, it was renovated with an entryway made of tempered glass and aluminum, as well as an elevator; the first story retains its original wooden and metal stair banister. Because of the drive-through on the first floor, the stories above it are carried on steel girders measuring 50 feet (15 m) long and weighing 30 short tons (27 long tons; 27 t). The upper levels consist of narrow hallways, small offices, and outdated bathrooms. The mezzanine directly above the first floor was originally used as the offices of Magnolia Petroleum, while the top stories housed their exploration, legal, and records offices. A 50-foot-tall (15 m) metal sign was bolted to the flat roof in the 1960s.

== History ==
Magnolia Petroleum bought the southeast corner of North Broadway and NW Seventh streets from J. B. Klein in 1918. The company subsequently announced plans for a three-story building there. Work had begun by the next year, at which point it was to be a five-story structure. The building was completed in 1920. When built, it was the first office structure in Downtown Oklahoma City north of Fourth Street and the tallest building on Broadway Street. It had cost $150,000. With the success of the Oklahoma City building, Magnolia Petroleum built a substantially larger structure, the Magnolia Petroleum Building, in Dallas. Magnolia Petroleum became affiliated (and later merged with) Mobil Corp in 1925, but Mobil continued to use the structure.

Mobil sold the building, along with 123 acres (50 ha) east of Oklahoma City, in 1960. Within three years, a sign advertising the rival Champlin Oil Company was erected on the roof, to Mobil executives' displeasure. In 1979, Denman and Ray H. Riddle spent about $1 million on renovations. The renovation included new interior finishes and utility systems, as well as cleaning of the exterior. The building was supposed to become an office for the Oklahoma City Public Housing Authority; since the authority employed numerous disabled staffers, the building was also made accessible. The building was added to the NRHP on October 4, 1979. The National Park Service's NRHP report noted that the building was in poor condition with discolored ornamentation and broken windows.

SouthOk Partners acquired the Magnolia Petroleum Building in 1992 for about $250,000. At the time, the 1980s oil glut had depressed Downtown Oklahoma City's economy; an Oklahoma City Council member said that "downtown is dead and we helped kill it". Chris Salyer and Dori Rowland, who led SouthOk Partners, planned to renovate the building into offices for their firm, National Check Cashiers Corp. Salyer subsequently recalled that people had thought he was wasting resources on the renovation, but during the next several decades, the surrounding neighborhood was redeveloped. The ground floor was converted into a drive-through bank branch for First Fidelity Bank in 2007. In May 2026, the building was sold for $4.6 million; the new owners, Pivot Project, planned to convert the building into a boutique hotel.

== See also ==
- National Register of Historic Places listings in Oklahoma County, Oklahoma
