= Hightower Park =

Park in Oklahoma City, Oklahoma, U.S.

- Location within Oklahoma
- Type: Pocket park
- Location: Oklahoma City, Oklahoma, U.S.
- Coordinates: 35.46854°N 97.51972°W

Hightower Park is a pocket park in Oklahoma City, in the U.S. state of Oklahoma.

== Description and history ==
Hightower Park is a grassy pocket park located at 208 Patience Latting Circle in downtown Oklahoma City, near City Hall, the Oklahoma City Museum of Art, and the Ronald J. Norick Downtown Library. Funding for the park has been provided by the annual Dean A. McGee Awards.

In 2018, Beatriz Mayorca's collection of colorful benches and chairs, called Nurture, was installed in the park. A few dozen people attended the dedication ceremony. Mayorca was selected by the Downtown OKC Partnership's Downtown Initiatives public art program; she said she "saw the park as an opportunity to provide seating in shaded spaces and to use colors inspired by her Latin American heritage".
