= Oklahoma City Streetcar =

Streetcar system in Oklahoma City, Oklahoma

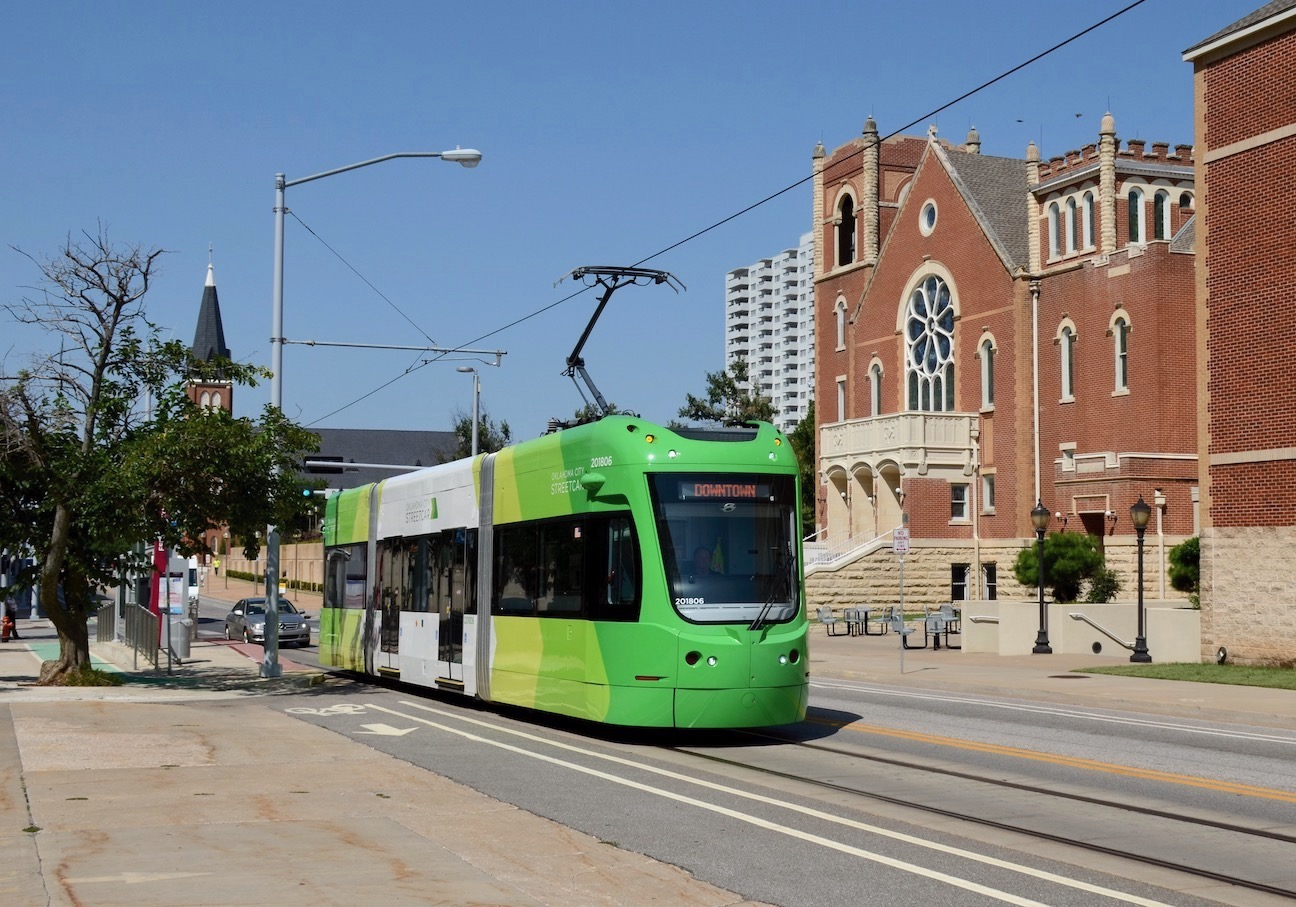
- A streetcar on 4th Street near Robinson Avenue in 2021

Overview
- Locale: Oklahoma City, Oklahoma, U.S.
- Transit type: Streetcar
- Number of lines: 2
- Number of stops: 22
- Annual ridership: 288,517 (FY2025)

Operation
- Began operation: December 14, 2018
- Operators: Embark, in partnership with Herzog Transit Services
- Character: Street running
- Rolling stock: Brookville Liberty Modern Streetcar
- Number of vehicles: 7
- Headway: 12-20 minutes

Technical
- System length: 5.6 mi (9.0 km)
- Track gauge: 4 ft 8 1/2 in (1,435 mm) standard gauge
- Minimum radius of curvature: 59 ft 0 in (17,983 mm)
- Electrification: 750 V DC overhead wire
- Top speed: 43.5 mph (70.0 km/h)

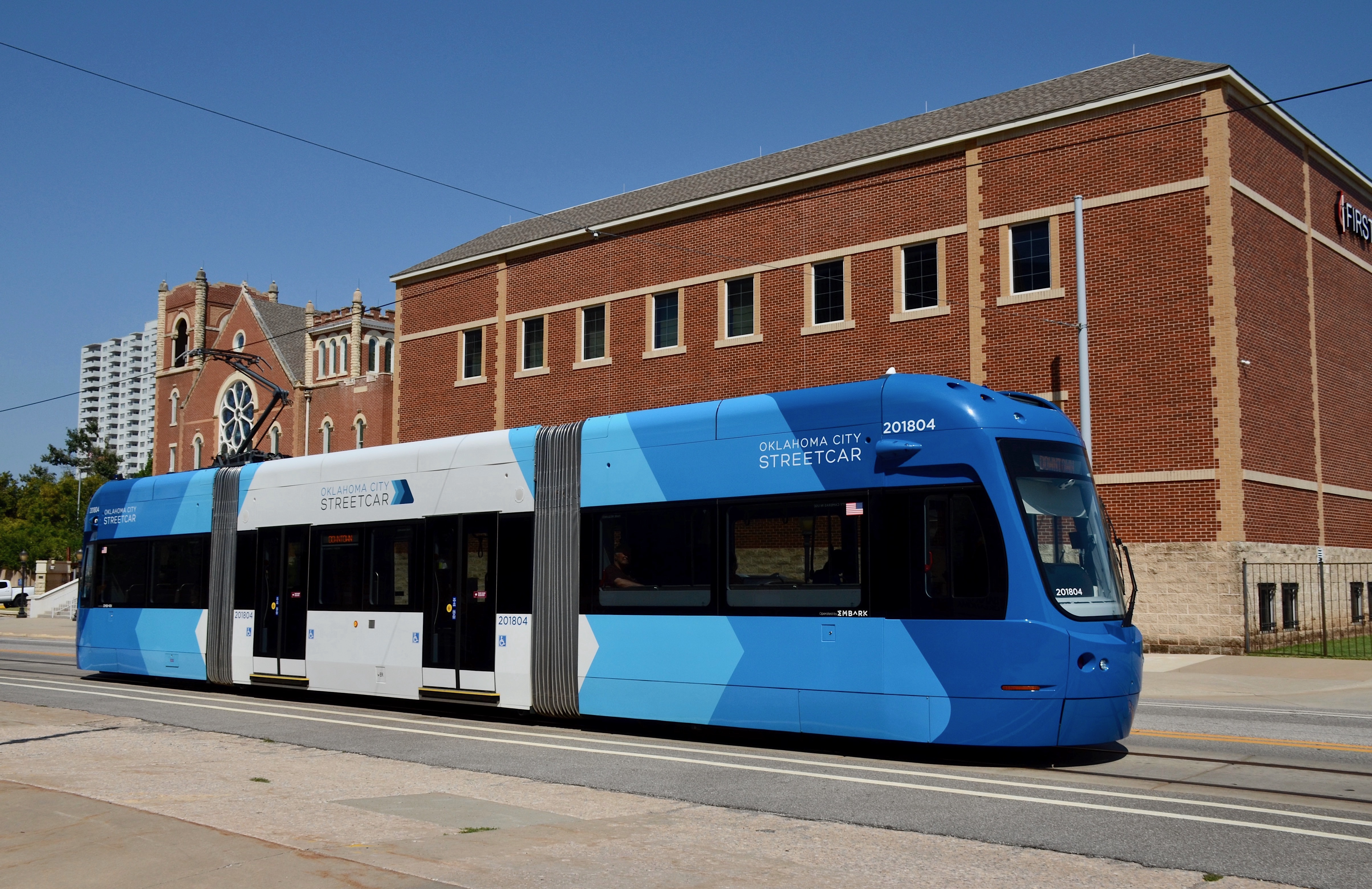
The fleet consists of seven Brookville Liberty streetcars, in three color schemes – here the "Clear Sky blue".

The Oklahoma City Streetcar (OKC Streetcar), also known as the MAPS 3 streetcar, is a streetcar system in Oklahoma City, Oklahoma, United States, that opened in 2018 and is operated by Embark. The 4.8-mile (7.7 km) system serves the greater downtown Oklahoma City area using modern, low-floor streetcars, the first of which was delivered in February 2018. The initial system has two lines that connect Oklahoma City's Central Business District with the entertainment district, Bricktown, and the Midtown District. Expansion to other districts surrounding downtown as well as more routes in the CBD is planned.

== History ==
The streetcar was first conceived in a 2005 regional transit study known as the Fixed Guideway Study. The concept lay dormant until local Oklahoma City businessman, inventor, and political activist Jeff Bezdek promoted the project to the Oklahoma City Council to be considered as part of Metropolitan Area Projects Plan 3 (MAPS 3) program. Bezdek launched a strategic campaign called the Modern Transit Project to generate public support for the initiative. Polling indicated that the streetcar plan had a majority of support from likely voters. The Oklahoma City Council incorporated the concept into the MAPS 3 program.

The system is financed through MAPS 3, a sales tax-financed public works program. The initiative was approved in 2009 via a majority vote by the citizens of Oklahoma City.

On September 29, 2015, the Oklahoma City city council approved the awarding of a $22 million contract to Inekon, of the Czech Republic, for the purchase of five streetcars, as well as spare parts and training. However, after Inekon failed to meet a one-month deadline for submitting required financial-guarantee information, project staff recommended switching to Brookville Equipment Corporation, another manufacturer that had also bid for the order. On November 10, the city council voted its approval for the staff to begin negotiations with Brookville for the streetcar contract. In March 2016, the city reached a final agreement with Brookville to purchase five streetcars, with an option for a sixth, at a cost of $24.9 million. The low-floor design is Brookville's "Liberty" model. In May 2016, the city council approved adding a sixth car to the order, and in February 2017 approved expanding the order to seven cars.

In December 2016, the city council awarded a $50 million contract for rail installation to builders Herzog and Stacy Witbeck, with construction planned to begin in early 2017 and continue for about two years. The formal groundbreaking for the project took place on February 7, 2017. The project was expected to cost a total of $131.8 million in 2017, but this had increased to $136 million by 2018.

The first streetcar arrived on February 12, 2018 (and was unloaded onto the rails the following day), and by March 12, three of the seven on order had arrived. Three different color schemes are used, with three cars in a "redbud" color, two in blue and two in green, along with white for a portion of each car. By the end of September 2018, six of the seven cars had been received.

=== Opening ===
Service commenced on the morning of December 14, 2018, followed by three days of city-funded celebrations. At a reported total installation price of $136 million, the cost was $29.6 million per mile (including purchase of the vehicles).

Service was free until February 1 (extended beyond an original plan for three weeks of free service, through January 4), to promote the new service. Embark began charging fares on February 2, 2019, the base fare being $1, with discounts for senior and disabled riders and with 24-hour and multi-day passes available.

At the time of the line's opening, it was tentatively planned that the line would not have regular Sunday service, and would operate only on Sundays when events were scheduled. However, Sunday service was scheduled for the system's first seven weeks, through late January, and Embark planned to monitor Sunday ridership during that time, to determine whether Sunday service should be made a permanent part of the schedule. In late January, Embark announced that Sunday ridership had been better than expected, and that consequently, Sunday service would resume on February 10 (after a one-weekend suspension) and be made a permanent part of the weekly schedule. Sunday service is scheduled to run from 11 a.m. to 7 p.m. through the end of March and then expand to 7 a.m. to 10 p.m. starting April 7.

== Design ==
The streetcar system is one of the conventional type using steel rails embedded into city streets, with modern vehicles powered from overhead electric wires. The streetcars are planned to be in use with everyday traffic. Initially, five vehicles were slated to be ordered. A sixth car was slated to be purchased through MAPS 3 with options for six more vehicles beyond the initial purchase. The streetcar vehicles are required to operate wirelessly for several hundred feet under the existing Burlington Northern Santa Fe Railway bridges that separate downtown Oklahoma City central business district from the Bricktown entertainment district.

== Operations ==
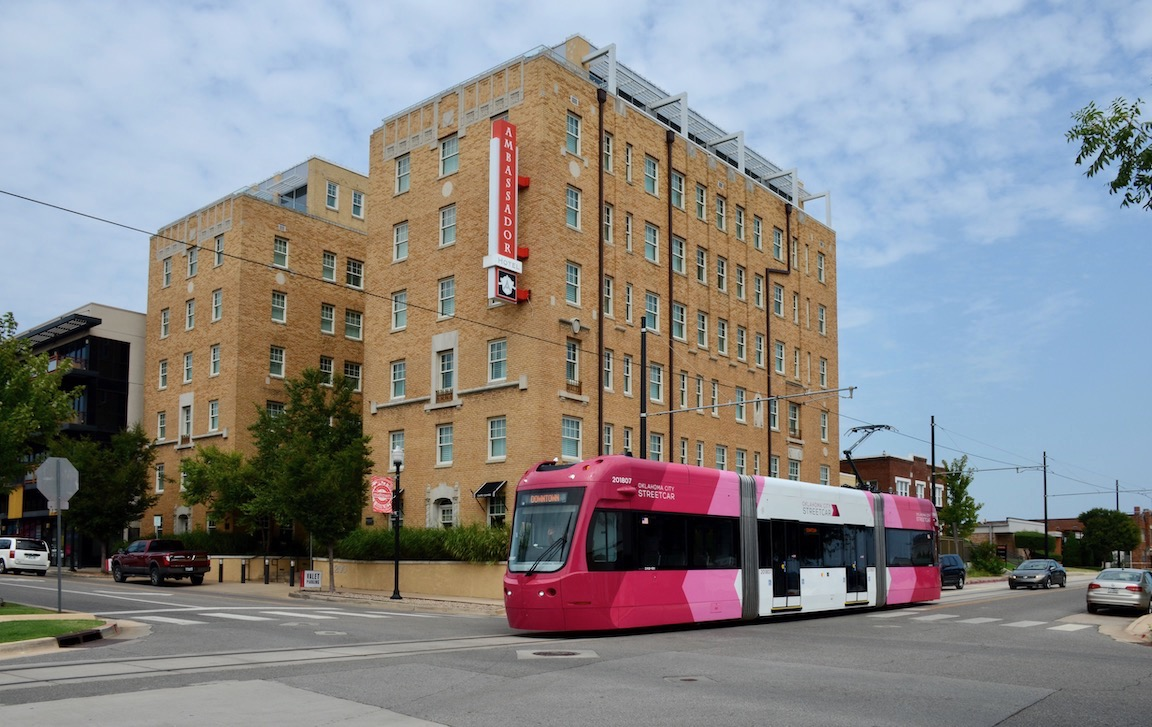
A streetcar in the "redbud" (magenta and pink) paint scheme on NW 11th Street in Midtown, on the northernmost part of the Downtown Loop route

The streetcar is operated by Embark through a contract with Herzog Transit Services provide day-to-day operations and maintenance. The system has two routes, with the 4.8-mile (7.7 km) Downtown Loop covering the full line and the shorter Bricktown Loop covering a 2-mile (3.2 km) portion of the line, in the Bricktown district.

=== Schedule ===
Service is provided seven days a week on the Downtown Loop, while the Bricktown Loop operates only on Fridays, Saturdays and Sundays. Hours of operation are 6 a.m. to midnight Monday through Thursday, 6 a.m. to 2 a.m. on Friday, 7 a.m. to 2 a.m. on Saturday, and 11 a.m. to 7 p.m. on Sunday. Streetcars operate on a headway of 15–18 minutes.

=== Fares ===
As of August 2026, the Oklahoma City Streetcar is free to ride.

At opening, the streetcar utilized a time-based fare system, with a cost of $1 for an hourly pass or $3 for a daily pass. Discounts were available to those who qualified for a reduced-fare ID, and downtown parking garages operated by Embark would include two free day passes with their parking fees.

In January 2026, Embark eliminated all streetcar fares for a six-month pilot program. The program led to a substantial increase in ridership, which led the agency to make the fare-free structure permanent once the pilot ended.

=== Operational loss ===
The OKC streetcar has an average monthly ridership of about 35,000 people, generating about $60,000 of revenue per month. The total monthly budgeted operational expense is $429,000, which results in a loss of approximately $369,000 each month the system is in operation.

=== Ridership ===
Month	Passenger trips
Dec. 2018	73,520
Jan. 2019	48,783
Feb. 2019	20,522
Mar. 2019	33,232
Apr. 2019	29,660
May 2019	22,582
June 2019	48,088
July 2019	33,113
Aug. 2019	26,480
Sep. 2019	30,186
Oct. 2019	28,832
Nov. 2019	28,559
Dec. 2019	46,185
Jan. 2020	23,846
Feb. 2020	22,211
Jul. 2021	26,875
Sep. 2021	15,754
Jul. 2022	23,328
Sep. 2022	15,898

On September 10, 2022, the OKC Streetcar reached its 1 million rider milestone.

== List of streetcar stops ==
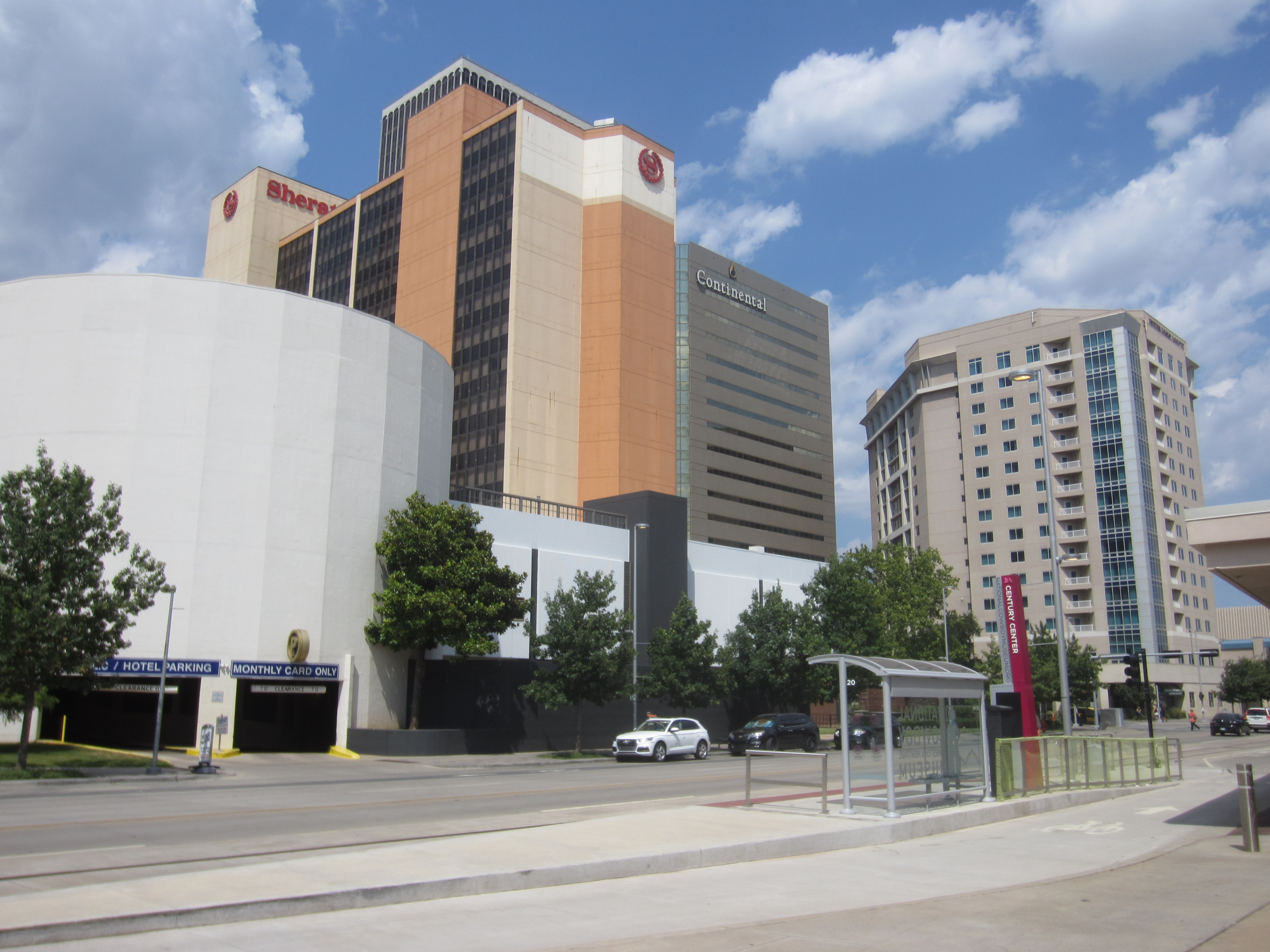
The Century Center stop, on Sheridan Avenue, which is along a section without overhead trolley wire

Downtown Loop
Bricktown Loop

Loop between Bricktown and Midtown

No.	Station	Intersection	Line	Connections
1	East Bricktown	Joe Carter and Flaming Lips Alley		
2	Ballpark	Johnny Bench and Mickey Mantle Drives		
3	Santa Fe Hub	Reno and E.K. Gaylord Boulevard		Amtrak: Heartland Flyer
4	Arena	Reno and Robinson		
5	Scissortail Park	Oklahoma City Boulevard and Robinson		Embark: 11; Convention Center Garage
6	Myriad Gardens	Hudson and Sheridan		Embark: 13, 13N, 40; Sheridan Walker Garage
7	Library	Hudson and Park		Embark: 9, 13, 13N, 40; Arts Garage
8	Transit Center	Hudson and NW 4th		Embark: 2, 3, 7, 8, 9, 10, 11, 12, 13, 13N, 14, 15, 16, 18, 22, 23N, 24, 38, 40; Rapid: NW; Citylink Edmond: 100X
9	Federal Courthouse	NW 4th and Robinson		Embark: 15, 18, 22, 23N
10	Broadway Avenue	Broadway and NW 4th		
11	Automobile Alley	Broadway and NW 8th		Embark: 23N
12	Art Park	Broadway and NW 11th		
13	North Hudson	NW 11th and Hudson		
14	Dewey Avenue	Dewey and NW 10th		
15	Midtown	NW 10th and Hudson		Embark: 38
16	NW 10th Street	NW 10th and Robinson		Embark: 2, 3, 24
17	Law School	Robinson and NW 7th		Embark: 2, 3, 24
18	Memorial Museum	Robinson and NW 4th		Embark: 2, 3, 11, 15, 18, 22, 23N, 24
19	Business District	Robinson and Park		Embark: 11; Rapid: NW; Citylink Edmond: 100X
20	Century Center	Sheridan and Robinson		Century Center Garage
21	Bricktown	Sheridan and E. K. Gaylord Boulevard		
22	Mickey Mantle	Sheridan and Mickey Mantle Drive		

== Planned expansion ==
Major expansion of the Oklahoma City Streetcar system beyond the first phase is already being planned. A steering committee made up of local mayors, city councillors, and other civic leaders approved plans for major expansion from the MAPS 3 system northward up the major thoroughfare Classen Boulevard to the planned 63rd Street commuter rail station stop and southward from downtown along Walker Avenue to the Southwest 25th Street (future) commuter-rail stop in Capitol Hill. Additional plans have also been discussed for streetcar expansion to Oklahoma City University through the historic Plaza District northwest of the initial starter line.

== Project oversight ==
The Oklahoma City Streetcar project as part of the MAPS initiative is overseen by a committee appointed by the mayor and city council of Oklahoma City. The original promoter of the streetcar system, Jeff Bezdek, is appointed to committee along with several other volunteers from the original Modern Transit Project initiative. Recommendations from this committee are formally made to the MAPS 3 oversight board which then makes recommendations to the Oklahoma City Council to be potentially enacted as policy.

== See also ==
- Streetcars in North America
