= Automobile Alley (Oklahoma City) =

- Automobile Alley Historic District
- U.S. National Register of Historic Places
- U.S. Historic district
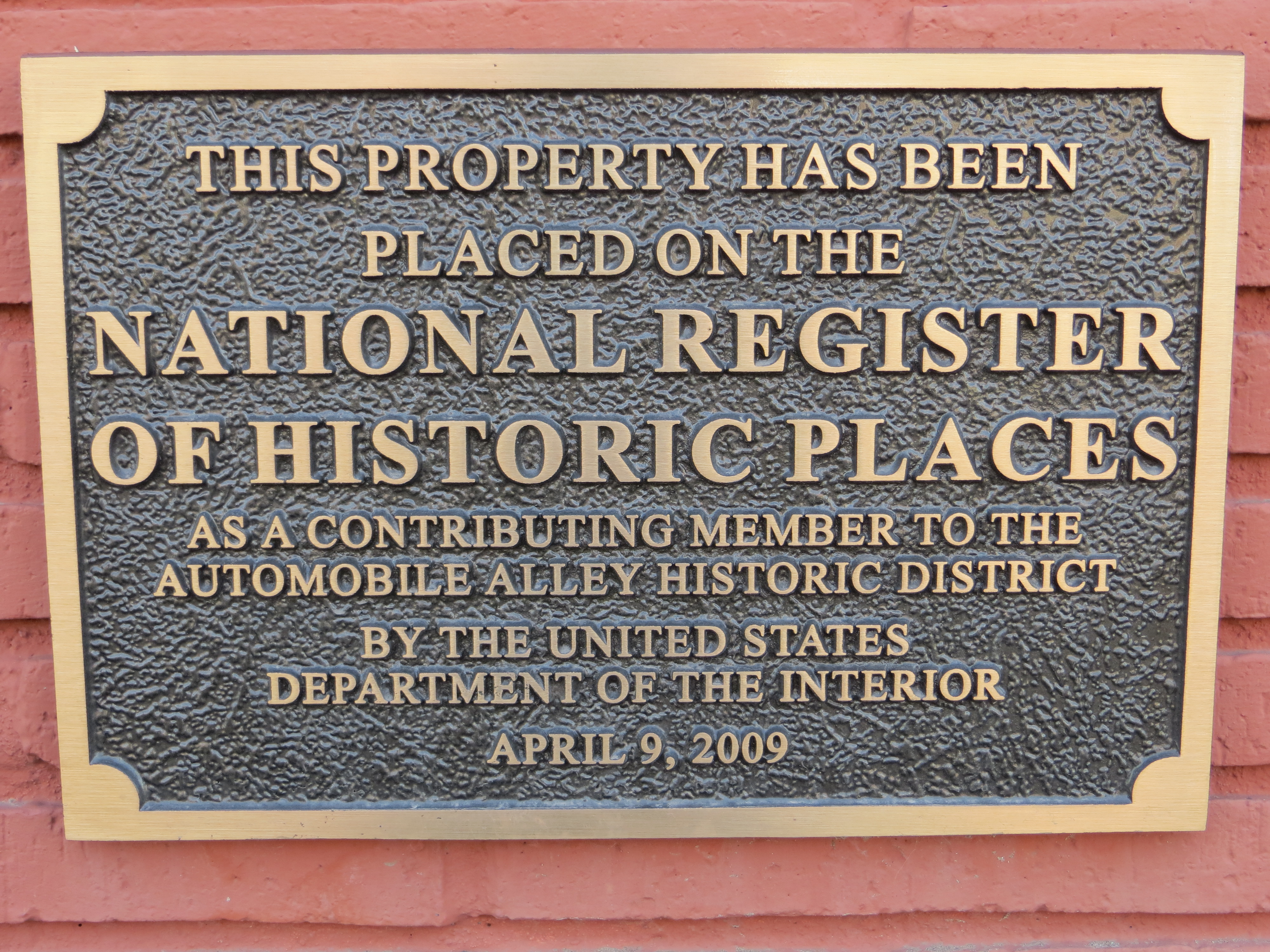
- NRHP plaque
- Location: N Broadway Avenue from NW 4th Street to W. Park Place, Oklahoma City
- Coordinates: 35°28′41.0311″N 97°30′57.8311″W
- Area: 26.4 acres (10.7 ha)
- Built: Various
- Architect: Various
- Architectural style: Early Commercial; Classical Revival; Modern
- NRHP reference No.: 99000351
- Added to NRHP: March 18, 1999

The Automobile Alley neighborhood and Automobile Alley Historic District in Oklahoma City is an upscale Urban area, located roughly along North Broadway Avenue in Downtown Oklahoma City. The district contains numerous low and mid-rise heritage buildings once home to the city's automobile dealerships, that today hosts many of the city's top bars and restaurants, retail shops, and urban residences alongside modern construction consisting mostly of residential housing and hotels. Automobile Alley is listed in the National Historic Register of neighborhoods.

In 2019, Volvo of Oklahoma City, the last original auto dealership remaining in Automobile Alley, moved to 14220 N Broadway Extension next to Mercedes of Oklahoma City, which was relocated from Automobile Alley in 2018. In 2020, Tesla would open up a showroom and repair facilities in the former Volvo dealership. While not being a dealership, Tesla does bring auto sales back to Automobile Alley.

== History ==
The Automobile Alley Historic District was primarily developed as a commercial district just north of downtown Oklahoma City. During the 1920s Automobile Alley, A-Alley for short, was a popular auto row, home to more than 2/3 of the city's car dealerships for several decades in the 1900s. (Note: The Oklahoma City Motor Car Dealers Association reported in 1923 that, "...nine of every 10 cars sold in Oklahoma were transactions started along Broadway between NW 4 and NW 13.") Numerous national and international brands had showrooms in Automobile Alley and the district thrived as a commercial hub for the state until the decline of downtown Oklahoma City during the 1970s and 1980s. (Note: Some of the earliest dealerships in this area represented Buick, Chevrolet, Cadillac, Pontiac, Rambler, Packard and Pierce Arrow.)

Remnants of the city's auto history still exist in Automobile Alley including urban show-palaces for Mercedes Benz of Oklahoma City, Jaguar of Oklahoma City, and Volvo of Oklahoma City, and the Bob Moore Auto Group is located nearby in MidTown. Today, these luxury icons of the automobile industry coexist alongside numerous retail shops, restaurants and bars that have opened in the ground floors of the historic buildings, with office and residential conversions in upper floors.

Broadway Avenue, with a right-of way of 100 feet (30 m), had been shown on the 1889 Oklahoma City plat as the widest street in the city, though it extended only as far as Northwest Fourth Street at the time. Subsequent plats continued the same width. Local legend says that the street was designed to be wide enough to allow a full team of horses and wagons to turn around.

== Boundaries ==
Automobile Alley has generally defined as the 20 square city block area north of the Oklahoma City CBD, centered along North Broadway Avenue between N. 13th Street to N 4th Street; where the city's prominent automobile retailers had lavish showrooms, regional headquarters, and maintenance facilities. Today's Automobile Alley has expanded to become a true neighborhood (48 square blocks), engulfing the former Triangle/Flatiron District towards the East; now the district boundaries extends roughly from Robinson Avenue to Interstate 235.

== Structures ==
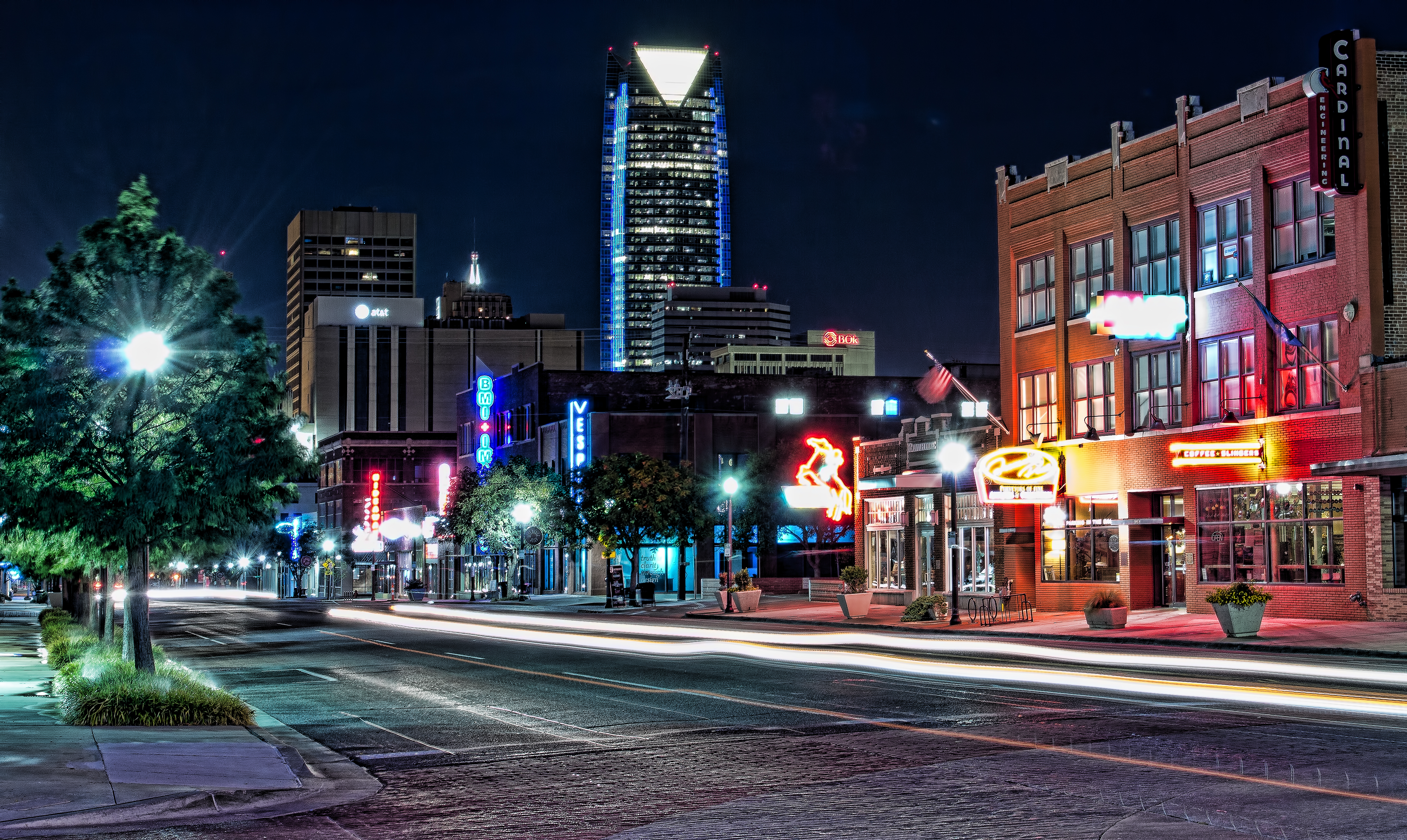
Nighttime view of North Broadway Avenue, Automobile Alley

Historic Buildings in Automobile Alley are noted at night for their colorful neon lighting and advertising displays, including numerous retail signage and building wraps along North Broadway Avenue.

Contributing properties include the Magnolia Petroleum Building.

== Redevelopment ==
Since the decline of downtown Oklahoma City in the 1980s there have been successive waves of development that have taken place in Automobile Alley. During the mid-1990s, there was an effort to redevelop the district, with the idea to transform many of the automobile showrooms and storefronts of Alley into upscale residential lofts, galleries, and office space. The city implemented a new streets-cape to define the district and numerous smaller companies brought office workers into previously boarded-up historic buildings, bringing the district back to life.

During the 2000s there was a push of retail development into the district that began with the relocation of the historic, upscale Colcord Oyster Bar from the renovated Colcord Building in the central business district to an Automobile Alley storefront. Additional destination restaurants soon followed included the opening of the Iguana Lounge Grill, Red PrimeSteak; Oklahoma City's premier Zagat-rated urban steak haunt, and the 2015 openings of the ultra-chic 'Broadway 10 Bar & Chop House' and 'Sidecar' Barley Wine Bar. Since 2010 retail shoppes have made the surge into the district where retailers are converting former automobile showrooms on the lower levels of buildings into retail boutiques including Rawhide, PlenTY Mercantile, The Factory, Perch'd Modern clothiers, and Broadway Wine Merchants. Additional developments are announced seemingly every week, further defining AAlley's position as Oklahoma City's upscale retail destination.

Since 2013 the neighborhood has seen the addition of modern residential and hotel projects as Automobile Alley's Eastern border has expanded toward I-235. Major projects include numerous upper floor loft conversions of the historic building stock (mostly along Broadway and Robinson Avenues), and the 2016 opening of the Metropolitan apartment complex. Additional residential projects are currently under construction or have been announced where the influx of new residents to the area likely may redefine Automobile Alley as a complete urban neighborhood to live, work, and play.

The last automobile dealership along Automobile Alley, Mercedes-Benz of Oklahoma City at 1225 North Broadway, plans to vacate its premises in 2018 and move to suburban Edmond. The new location will occupy half of a 65,000 square feet (6,000 m^{2}) building that was constructed to house Volkswagen of Edmond in 2003. The existing Mercedes-Benz building on Broadway was originally constructed in 1985 by Frank Bolen, a car dealer who opened Benchmark Motors inside. Bolen later sold the business to Bob Howard, who turned it in to Mercedes-Benz of Oklahoma City. (Note: Howard previously owned the Buick Building, another icon of Automobile Alley that has been converted to other uses. He also owns Volkswagen of Edmond.) Howard recently sold the Mercedes-Benz dealership to Mark Moore.

== Transportation ==
Automobile Alley is served by the Oklahoma City Streetcar at Automobile Alley station.

Preceding station	EMBARK	Following station
Art Park Next counter-clockwise	Downtown Loop	Broadway Avenue One-way operation

== Gallery ==
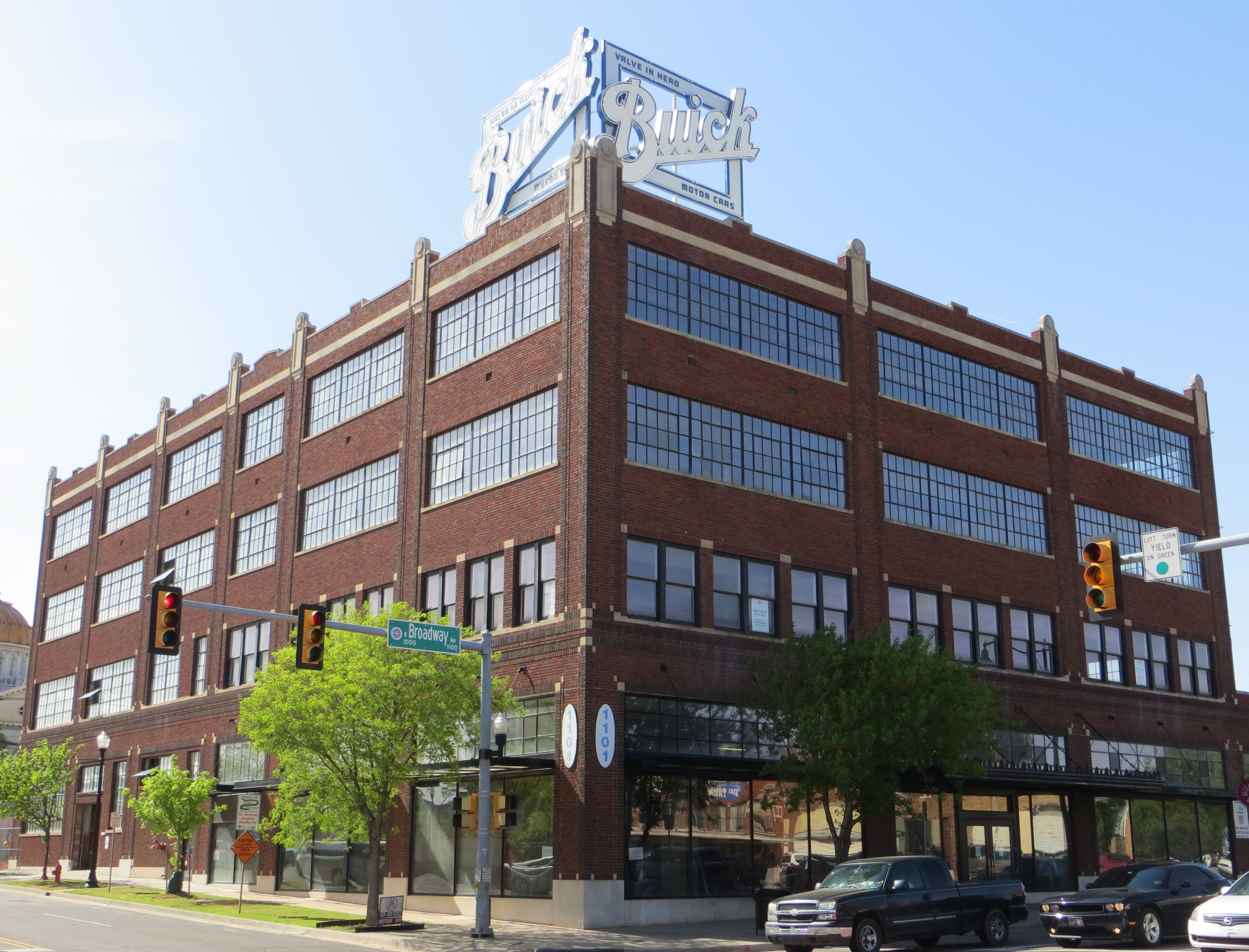
Former Buick dealer building

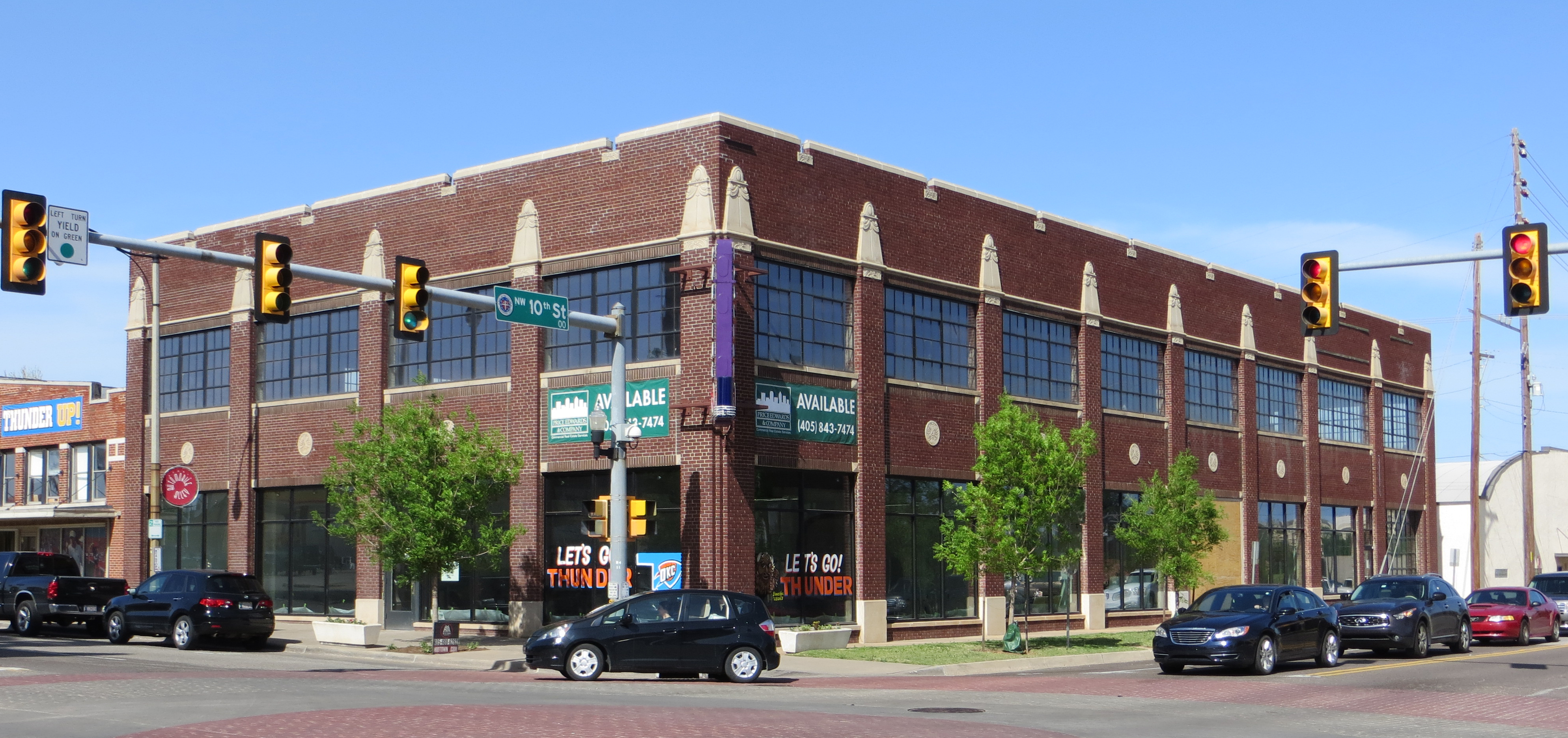
Former Pontiac dealer building

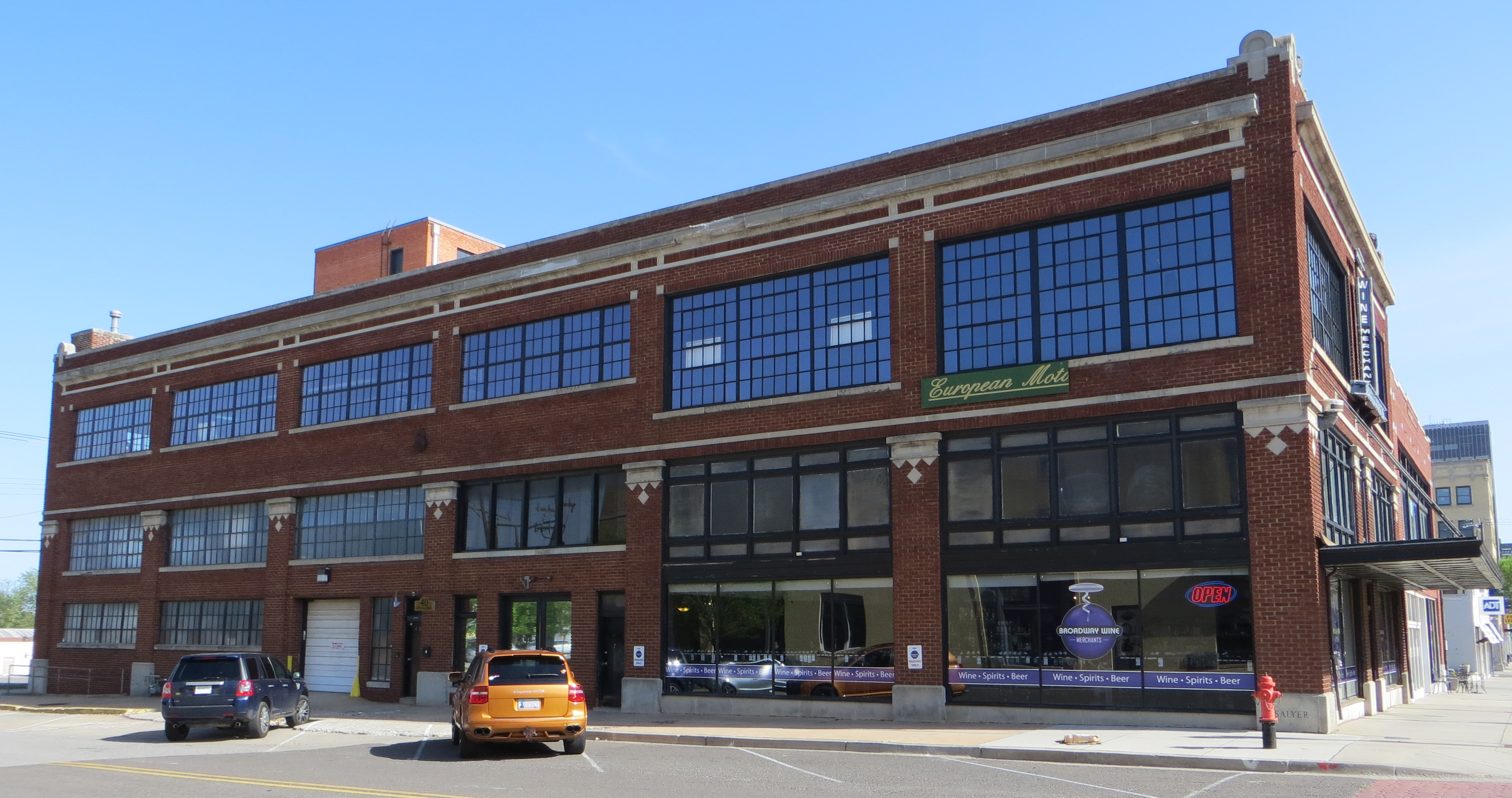
Former Shelburne Motor Company building

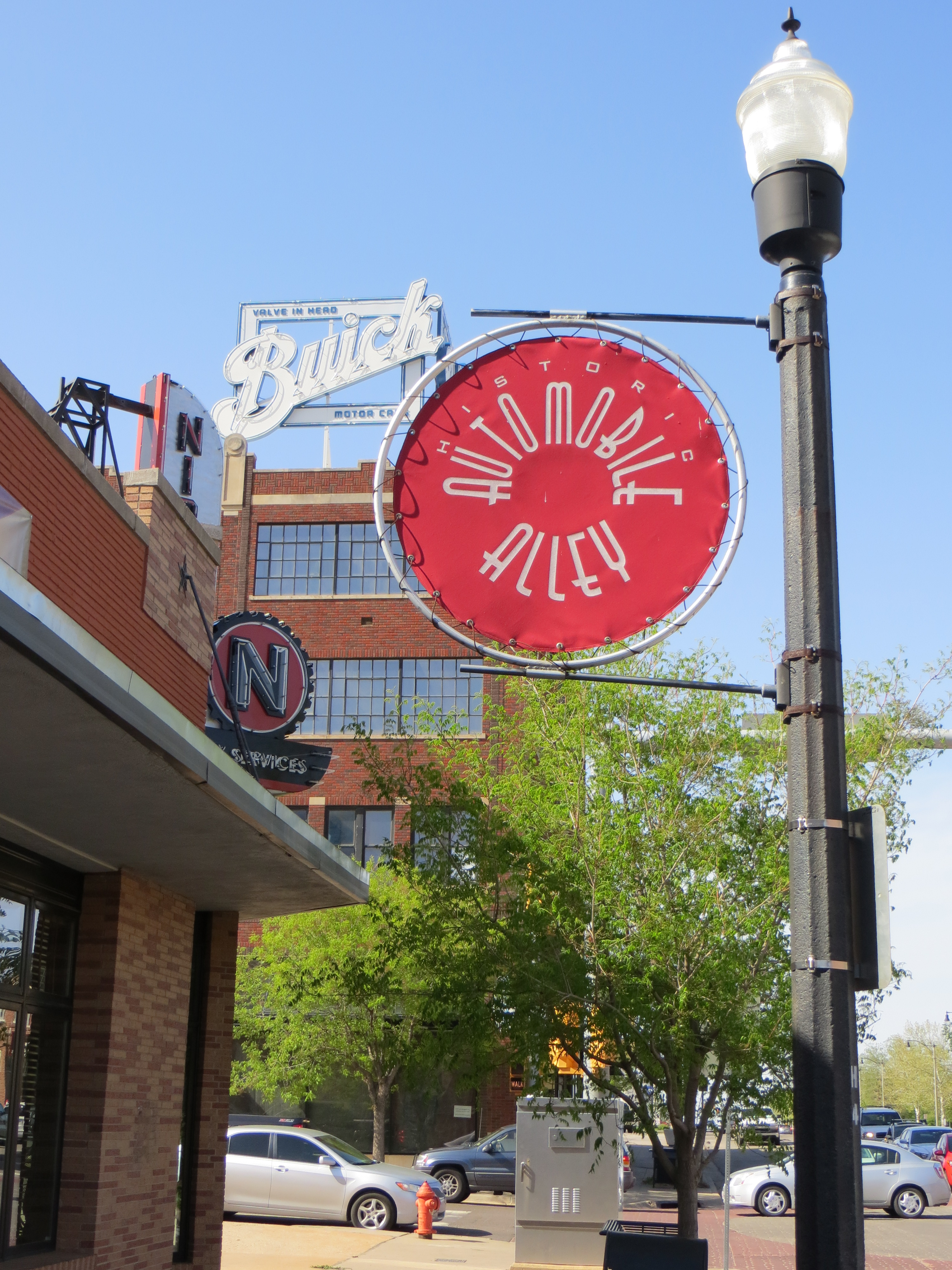
Lamppost flag

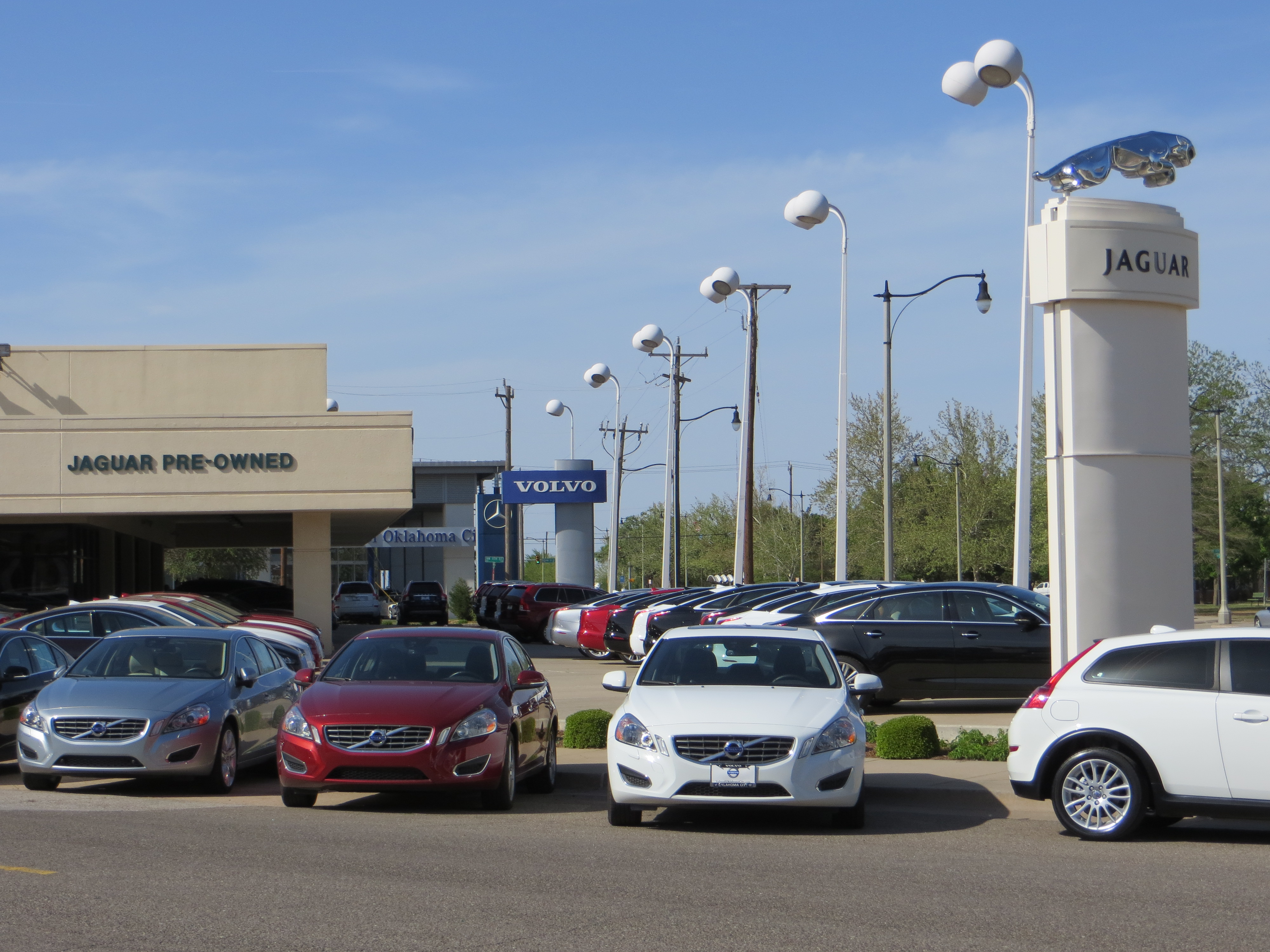
Current foreign car dealerships
