= SoSA, Oklahoma City =

Coordinates: 35°28′34″N 97°31′27″W

"SoSA" is the informal name of a small, inner-city neighborhood near downtown Oklahoma City. A website of the same name was developed by the architect and former resident who coined the term. SoSA is a reference to Oklahoma City’s favorite son, Sammy “Swingin’ Sammy” Sosa. The name has not been accepted by a majority of the residents as an official designation, nor does the City of Oklahoma City use the term. Officially referred to as the "Cottage District" due to the number of quaint, old-fashioned homes in the area, SoSA is the name for the district used primarily by non-residents and real-estate agents.

The portion of Midtown sometimes referred to as SoSA is a residential neighborhood known for its unique mix of architecture. It is a small, eclectic inner city neighborhood characterized by a mix of early 1900s era cottages, blight, and striking contemporary architecture. Situated on the Northwest corner of the central business district, SoSA is roughly bordered by Classen Boulevard, Walker Street, NW 6th Street, and NW 10th Street. The City of Oklahoma City maintains a design review commission called the "Urban Design Commission" that is charged with applying the city's statutory design guidelines.

After the post World War II exodus of population to the suburbs, this neighborhood followed the general decline of downtown and developed an unsavory reputation. The neighborhood still has pockets of blight, but a transformation began in 2002 with the rehabilitation of two 1906 residential buildings. As of 2010 there are seven architect-designed residences within a two block radius, with two more projects currently being designed. The high density of architect-occupied, contemporary dwellings has caused it to be called "the architect's ghetto."

== See also ==
- Neighborhoods of Oklahoma City
