= Citylink Edmond =

Public transit operator in Oklahoma, US

- Founded: 2009
- Service type: bus service, express bus service, paratransit
- Fleet: 13 (2022)
- Annual ridership: 134,017 (2022)
- Operator: RATP Dev
- Website: Edmond

Citylink Edmond is a public transit operator in Edmond, Oklahoma, which began operating on July 1, 2009. Citylink operates seven bus routes. Six routes run within Edmond, while the seventh, branded as Expresslink, provides commuter service to Downtown Oklahoma City.

The Citylink Transfer Center is located in downtown Edmond at the near the Festival Market Place building. All seven routes stop at the transfer center.

Citylink also operates CAPS, a paratransit service that operates within Edmond's city limits.

== Routes ==
All routes operate Monday through Friday. Non-Expresslink routes operate on Saturday with reduced frequency.

- 1: Boulevard - Danforth - Walmart
- 2: Fretz - 15th - Crest Foods
- 3: 2nd - Bryant - 15th - Broadway
- 4: UCO - Kicking Bird - Target
- 5: UCO - Boulevard - Broadway
- 6: 2nd - I-35 - Mercy/Integris
- 100X (Expresslink): Edmond - Oklahoma City

== See also ==
- List of bus transit systems in the United States
