= Bricktown Canal =

Canal and tourist attraction in Oklahoma City

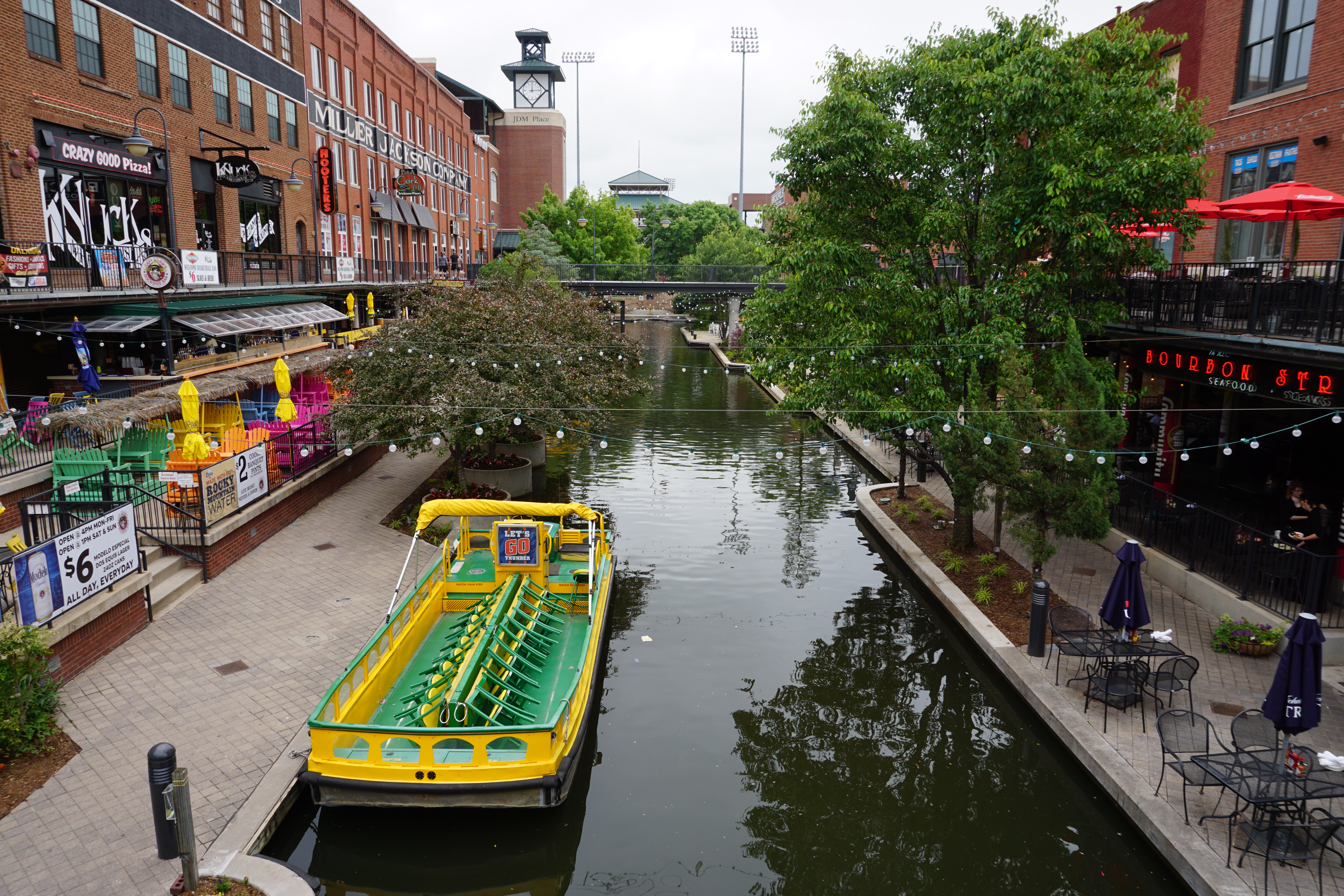
- Water taxi in the canal, 2016

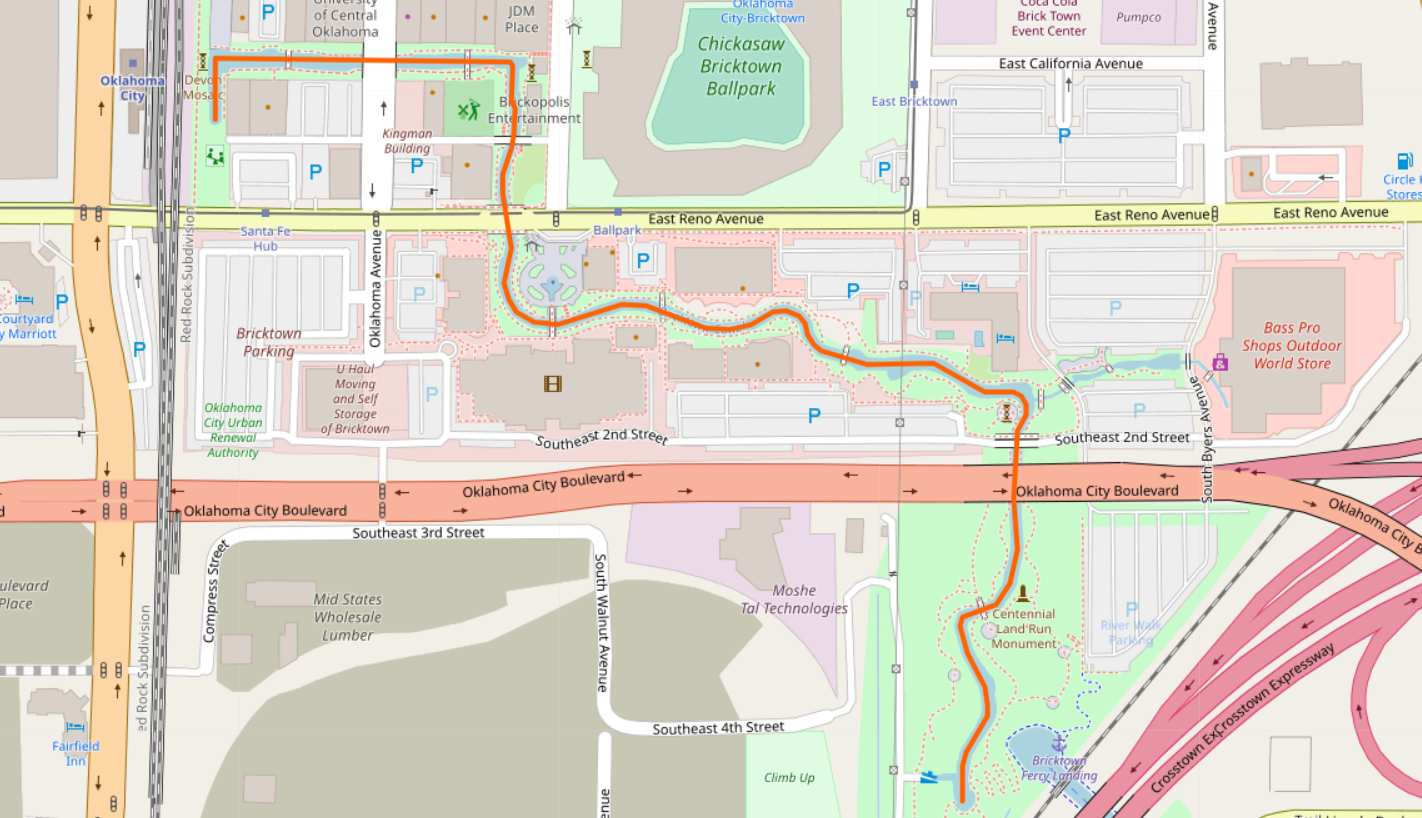
- Location within Bricktown with the canal route highlighted in red

- Location within Oklahoma
- Location: Bricktown, Oklahoma City, Oklahoma
- Country: United States
- Coordinates: 35°27′47″N 97°30′40″W

Specifications
- Length: 1 mile (1.6 km)
- Status: Open

History
- Current owner: City of Oklahoma City
- Principal engineer: Johnson & Associates; Clowers Engineering Co.
- Date approved: 1993
- Date of first use: July 2, 1999
- Date extended: 2004, 2013
- Contractors: Oscar J. Boldt Construction Co.; Wynn Construction Co., Inc.

Geography
- Beginning coordinates: 35°27′54″N 97°30′44″W
- Ending coordinates: 35°27′37″N 97°30′20″W
- Connects to: Oklahoma River

The Bricktown Canal is a canal in Bricktown, Oklahoma City, in the U.S. state of Oklahoma. The waterway opened in 1999 and has become a popular tourist destination featuring many attractions. Downtown OKC Partnership and the Bricktown Association held a 20th anniversary celebration in 2019.

== History ==
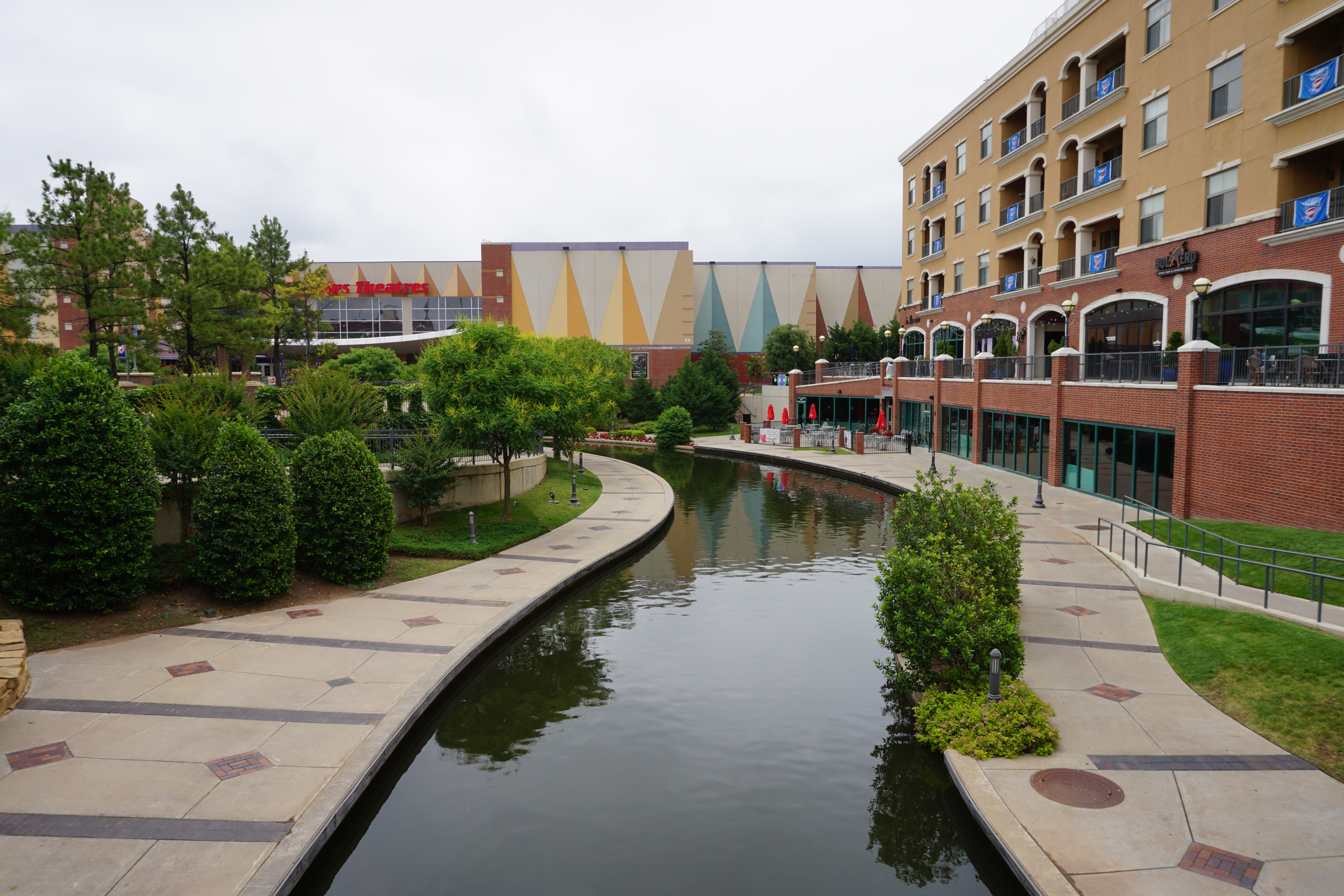
Part of the canal in 2016

The idea of a canal running through Bricktown started to first become noticeable in the late 1880s, in 1890 following a year of construction a canal had opened; however, two days later the canal had naturally drained itself leaving an empty waterbed through the area. Nearly a century later in the late 1990s in an attempt to bring "spark" to the area the idea began to once again gain support, a canal was built and opened on July 2, 1999. The canal was funded after voters in the city approved a temporary one-cent sales tax increase as part of the Metropolitan Area Projects (MAPS). It has proved to be a success for the area spurring over $109 million spent in development. The canal is currently one mile long and underwent improvements in 2004 and again in 2013, it is maintained by the Oklahoma City Parks and Recreation Department.

=== 2018 electrocution death and injury ===
External videos
- City releases video of September canal accident

On September 30, 2018, Wesley Seeley was walking along the canal when he leaned on a lighting fixture, not knowing that it was loose. The fixture gave way, falling into the canal, and bringing Seeley with it. Seely attempted to pull himself out of the canal by grabbing the exposed electrical wires from the fixture, causing him to get shocked. Brandon Gann jumped into the canal in an attempt to save Seeley and was also shocked; Seeley died as a result of his injuries while Gann was taken to a hospital in critical condition and later recovered. The city council agreed to settle a claim by paying $169,650 to Gann and agreed to design and install new up-to-date lighting fixtures across the entirety of the canal. A second claim was settled when the city agreed to pay $175,000 to the estate of Seely.
