= Bricktown, Oklahoma City =

Bricktown
- District
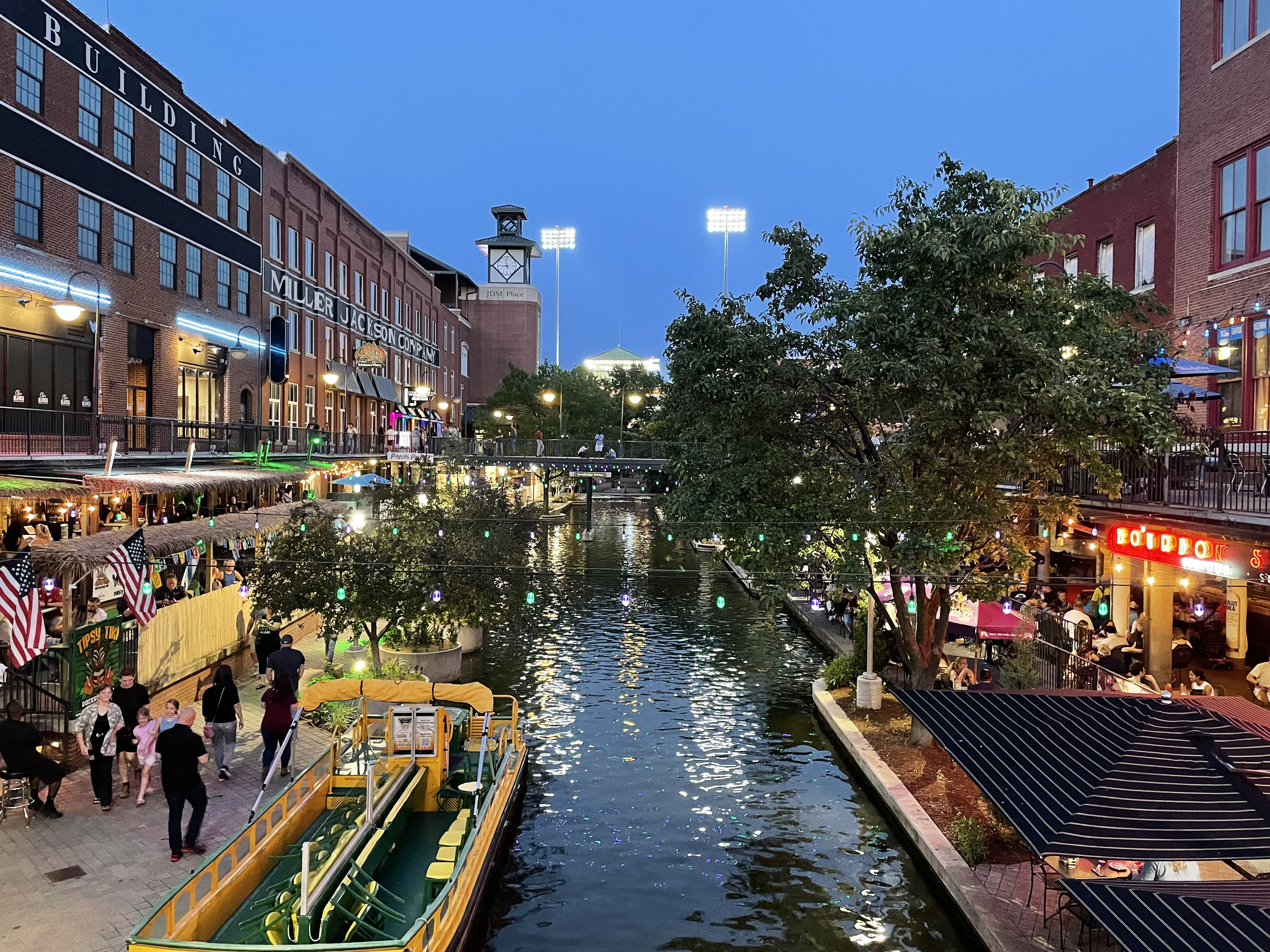
- The Bricktown Canal

- Location within Oklahoma Location within the United States
- Country: United States
- State: Oklahoma
- City: Oklahoma City
- Established: 1898
- Website: Bricktown Official Website

Bricktown is an entertainment district just east of downtown Oklahoma City, Oklahoma, United States. It was formerly a major warehouse district. The major attractions of the district are the Chickasaw Bricktown Ballpark, the navigable Bricktown Canal, and the 16-screen Harkins movie theatre.

== Boundaries and management ==
Bricktown Entertainment District includes some 50 square city blocks bounded between the Oklahoma River on the south, I-235 on the east, Deep Deuce District to the North, and the Oklahoma City Central Business District to the West. The general boundary of the Bricktown Core Development District (also known as Upper Bricktown) is as follows: An area bordered generally by the BNSF Railway; Reno Avenue; Centennial Expressway; and the railroad right-of-way between Main and NE 1st.

The district is managed by the Bricktown Association and the Downtown Oklahoma City Partnership. Bricktown is one of six districts within the Downtown Oklahoma City Business Improvement Boundary. Downtown Oklahoma City Partnership is charged with the maintenance and operations of the Bricktown district and oversees promotion. The Bricktown Association and Downtown Oklahoma City Partnership are united in the shared goal for Bricktown to continue to flourish as OKC's premier entertainment district.

== History ==
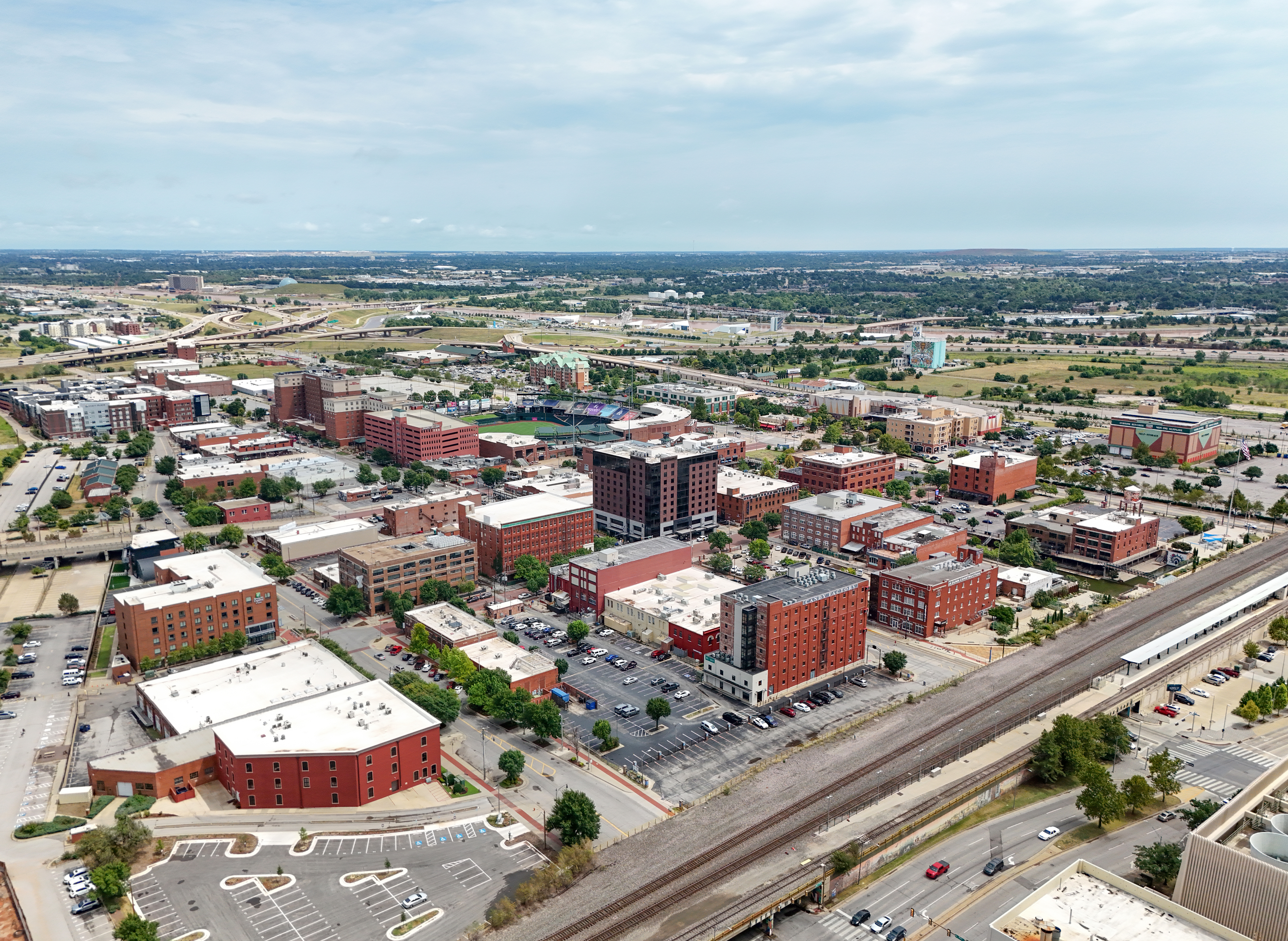
Aerial view of Bricktown

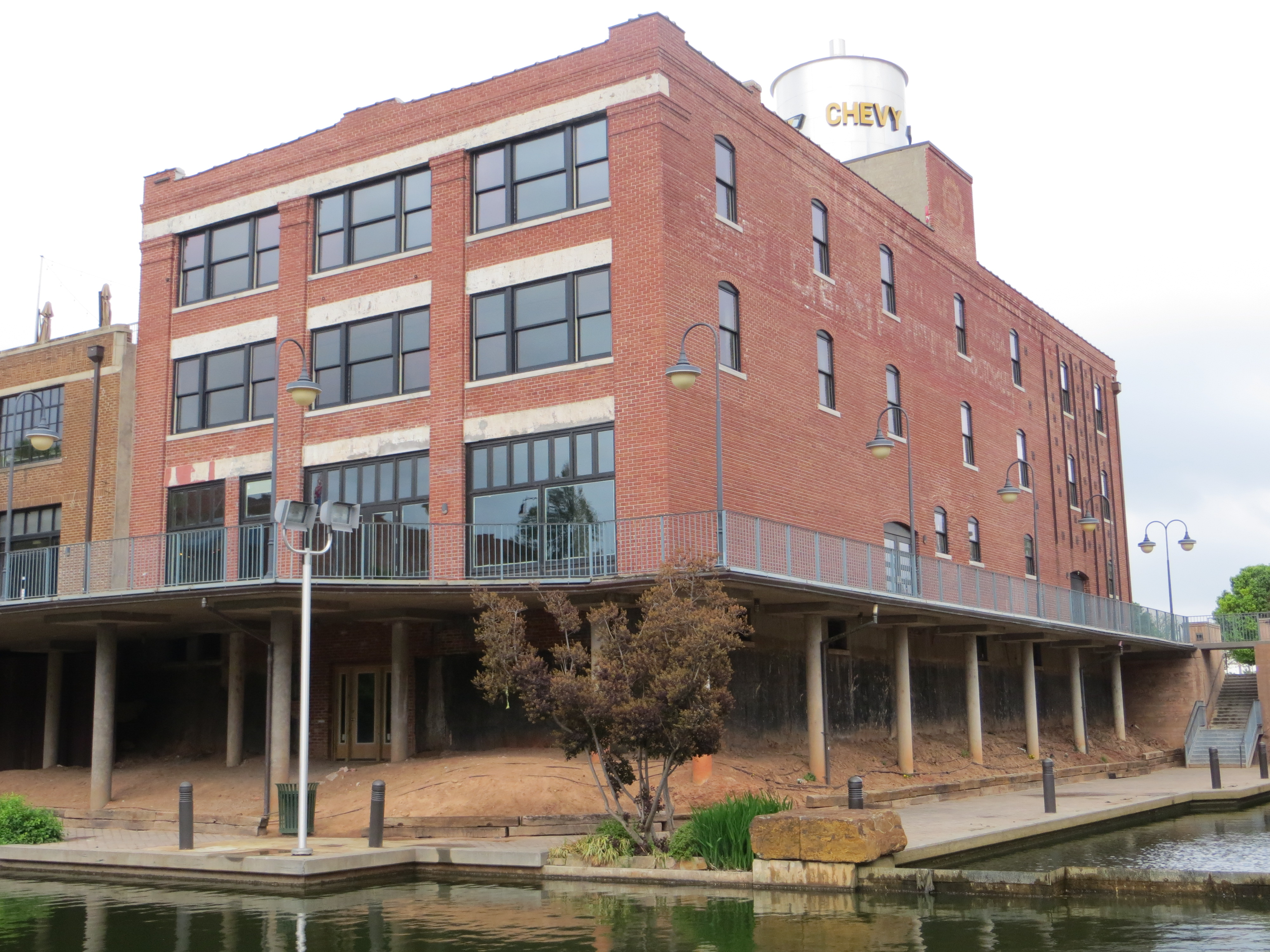
J I Case Plow Works, 2 East California Avenue

Four railroad companies had freight operations east of the Santa Fe tracks in what is now Bricktown in the late 19th and early 20th century. The first brick structures, which were typically only one or two stories, appeared between 1898 and 1903. Larger brick buildings were constructed between 1903 and 1911, and the tallest brick buildings were built between 1911 and 1930. Working-class houses were built nearby.

Oklahoma City's first black newspaper, the Black Dispatch, was located in Bricktown at 228 E. First; it reported on the struggle to end racially segregated housing in the city. Also in that area was the first local chapter of the National Association for the Advancement of Colored People (NAACP), founded in the early 20th century to work for the civil rights of African Americans.

The decline of the area began with the onset of the Great Depression, which diminished businesses in the area. The growth of eastern suburbs and subsidized highways during and after World War II attracted many residents to newer housing. Railroads restructured and freight traffic moved to trucks and highways. By 1980, Bricktown had become a cluster of abandoned buildings.

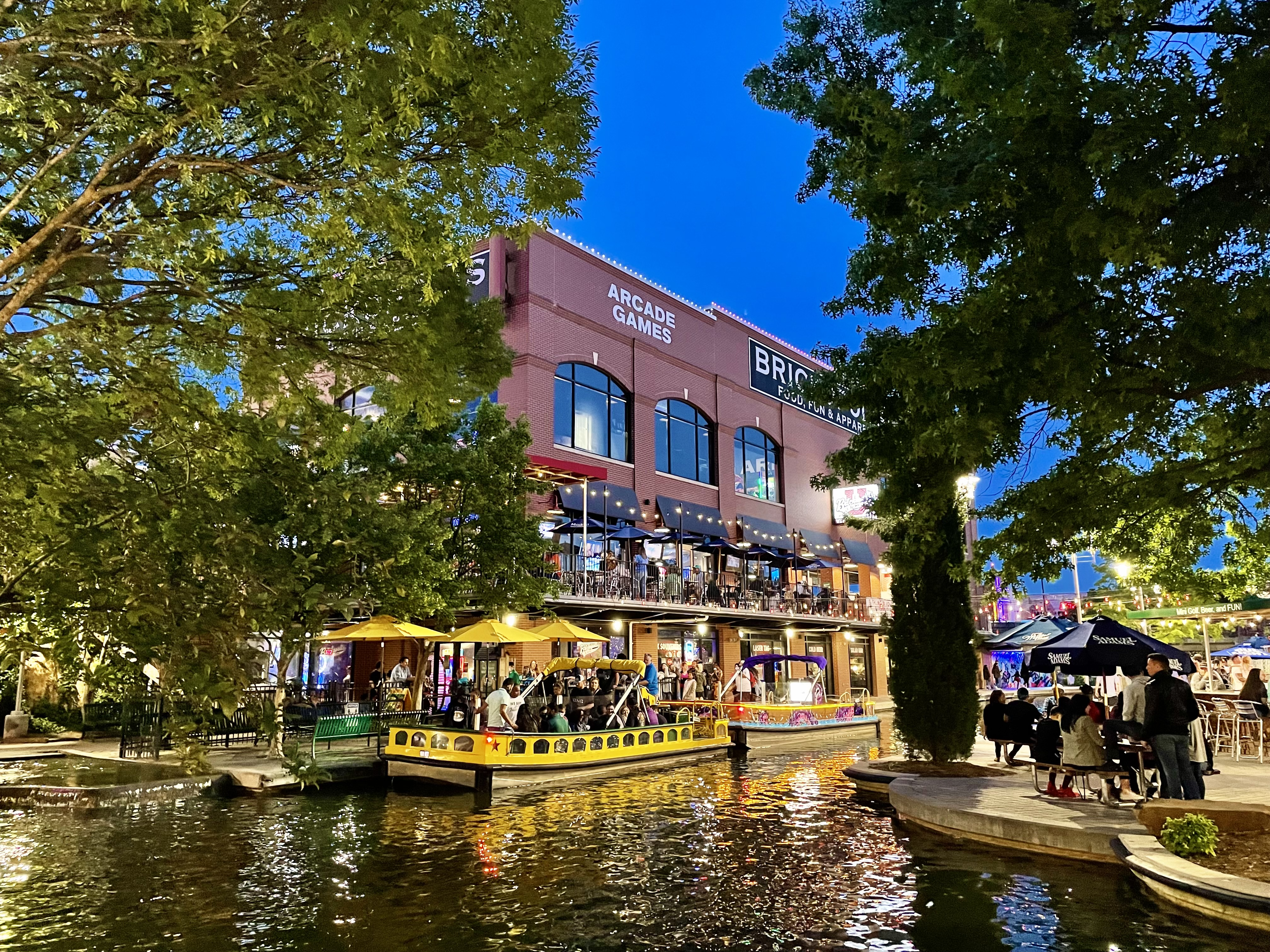
Water taxis on the Bricktown Canal.

In the 1990s, mayor Ron Norick persuaded Oklahoma City residents to approve a series of tax incentives to lure new businesses, but these were not sufficient. A visit to Indianapolis, Indiana, which had recently beat the city in a competition for a new airline maintenance plant, led him to believe that Oklahoma City needed a vibrant downtown. It lacked the range of activities and amenities to attract more residents and visitors. Along with Greater Oklahoma City Chamber President Ray Ackerman, Norick and their staffs developed the Metropolitan Area Projects or MAPS, which approval led to the construction of the Bricktown ballpark and a tree-lined, mile-long canal through the district, as well as other projects in downtown. The ballpark opened in 1998 and the canal opened in July 1999. Water taxis provide interactive guided tours featuring Oklahoma City history, Bricktown businesses, and local art along the canal.

In 2024, a $1.6 billion development was proposed that included plans to construct Legends Tower, the tallest skyscraper in the United States.

== Arts and culture ==
The district contains a number of public sculptures and murals, including a monument to the Oklahoma Land Run. The Centennial Land Run Monument, a large bronze sculpture by artist Paul Moore, is at the south end of Bricktown Canal. It commemorates the Land Run of 1889, which marked the opening of the Unassigned Lands area to settlement. This area is now a city park, open 24 hours a day, year round, and there is no admission fee.

An annual Bricktown Art Festival is held in mid-July.

== Transportation ==
The Oklahoma City Streetcar loops around Bricktown and connects the neighborhood to downtown. It opened in December 2018.

Services at Bricktown, Mickey Mantle, and East Bricktown stations
Preceding station	EMBARK	Following station
Century Center One-way operation	Downtown Loop	Ballpark Next clockwise
Century Center One-way operation	Bricktown Loop	Ballpark Next clockwise

Amtrak's Heartland Flyer service to Fort Worth departs every morning from the old Santa Fe Depot, located by the west entrance to Bricktown, and returns in the evenings.
