= Triangle District =

Coordinates: 35°28′22″N 97°30′38″W

The Flatiron District (also sometimes called the Triangle District) in Oklahoma City is so named because several buildings in the district were built in a flatiron (triangular) architectural style due to Harrison Avenue diagonally intersecting the east-west and north-south streets of the district. The district is bounded by N.E. 4th St on the south, Interstate-235 on the east, the Santa Fe Railroad on the west and N.E. 9th St on the north. Like much of downtown Oklahoma City, the district was blighted for decades until the downtown renaissance began in the 1990s. Since then the district has seen numerous developments and is closely tied to the revitalization of both Deep Deuce and Automobile Alley.

Several mixed use developments have been seen in recent years including the Block 42 residential development, the renovation of 35 Harrison Avenue and subsequent occupation by Elliott + Associates Architects, WeGoLook.com's occupation of the building at 100 N.E 5th St, and the Oklahoma Baptist University International Graduate School at 111 Harrison Avenue.

Developer Grant Humphreys (also the developer of Block 42) announced plans to move forward with the renovation of the Flatiron Building at N.E 5th and Harrison with an adjoining five story retail/office/residential complex added to the development. The plans were approved by the Oklahoma City Urban Renewal Authority in 2008. Though the building has yet to see renovation, development plans are still underway.
