= BC Clark Jewelers =

Jewelry retailer in Oklahoma City

- Company type: Jewelry store
- Industry: Jewelry Watches Crystal Gold Diamonds China Silver Glassware
- Founded: 1892 In Purcell Oklahoma
- Founder: Benton Clyde Clark (B.C. Clark Sr.)
- Headquarters: Oklahoma City, Oklahoma, Oklahoma
- Number of locations: 3
- Area served: Greater Oklahoma City and surrounding areas
- Products: Rings, Neckleses, Earrings, Bracelets, Broaches, Watches, Fine Silver, China, Crystal, Diamonds, Glassware.
- Owner: Family Owned
- Number of employees: 62
- Website: bcclark.com

BC Clark Jewelers is a full-service jeweler that currently operates three stores in Oklahoma City, Oklahoma. The company, founded in Purcell, Indian Territory in 1892, claims to be "Oklahoma's oldest jeweler." Today, the company operates three locations in Oklahoma City.

BC Clark is most well known for its "Anniversary Sale" jingle, which was originally created in 1956. The jingle is played in advertisements for the retailer's five-week advertising campaign during the holiday shopping season, always starting during the evening on Thanksgiving Day. According to the company, the jingle "may be the longest continuously running jingle in the entire United States." The jingle is seen as somewhat of a local holiday tradition by many from the Oklahoma City area who are used to hearing the mid-1950s recording during the holidays.
