= Midtown Oklahoma City =

Neighborhood in Oklahoma City, Oklahoma

Coordinates: 35°28′44″N 97°31′16″W

Midtown is located northwest of downtown Oklahoma City, surrounded by Automobile Alley to the east and Asia District to the north. It is home to St. Anthony's Hospital (the city's oldest and largest) and smaller communities like Church Row. It is a 387-acre (1.57 km^{2}) area with an estimated 3,501 residents.

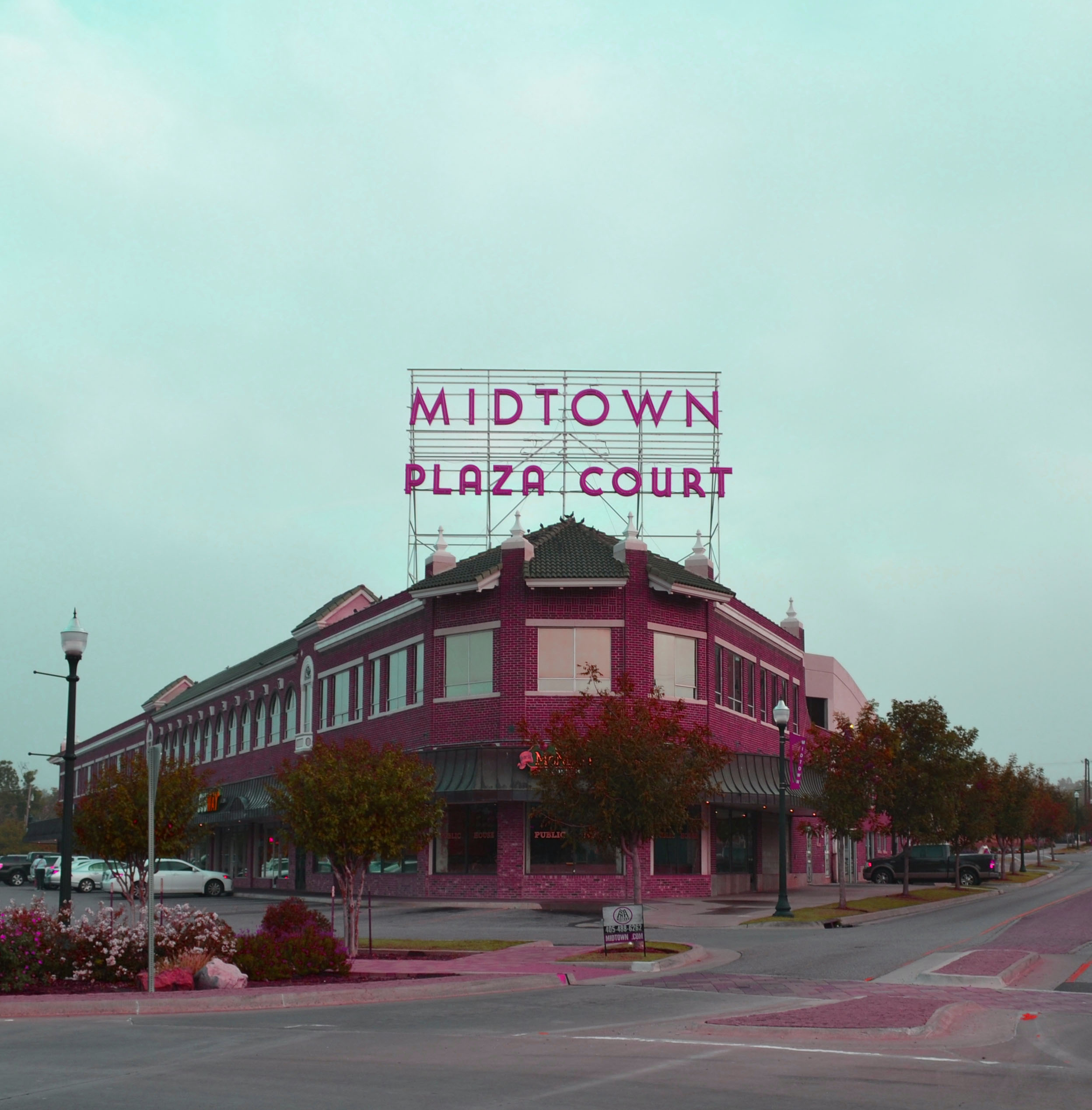
The Plaza Court Building, listed on the National Register of Historic Places, in 2012.

Midtown, like much of the inner city, is experiencing a renaissance as the city cleans out the blight and decay and replaces it with upscale urban amenities like the 5th Street and 10th Street streetscapes.

According to MidtownOKC.com, a website provided by property owners and other leaders in Midtown's renaissance, the vision for Midtown is a response to the desire for urban lifestyle options in Oklahoma City. "Active pedestrian street life, including sidewalk cafes and locations utilized for outdoor events and festivals, creates an interactive and enjoyable public life... In this vision, a hip, energized urban population enjoys exceptional restaurants, stylish shops, and first-rate art galleries, all located nearby."

The vision for Midtown seems to be similar to the nearby Triangle District in downtown Oklahoma City, which also considers the Live-Work-Play lifestyle to be the fundamental idea of the project.

The Cottage District, locally known as "SOSA", is an eclectic residential area within Midtown containing several examples of excellent architecture.

There are notable construction projects going in Midtown, including numerous local eateries, shops, and new housing.

Midtown is served by the Oklahoma City Streetcar at Midtown station.
