= Kerr Park =

Park in Oklahoma City, Oklahoma, U.S.

- Location within Oklahoma
- Location: Oklahoma City, Oklahoma, U.S.
- Coordinates: 35.46948°N 97.51485°W

Kerr Park is an urban park in Oklahoma City, in the U.S. state of Oklahoma.

== History ==
Occupy OKC, an affiliate of the Occupy movement, was stationed in the park in 2011.

The park was renovated in 2018.
