= Centennial Land Run Monument =

Sculpture in Oklahoma City, Oklahoma, U.S.

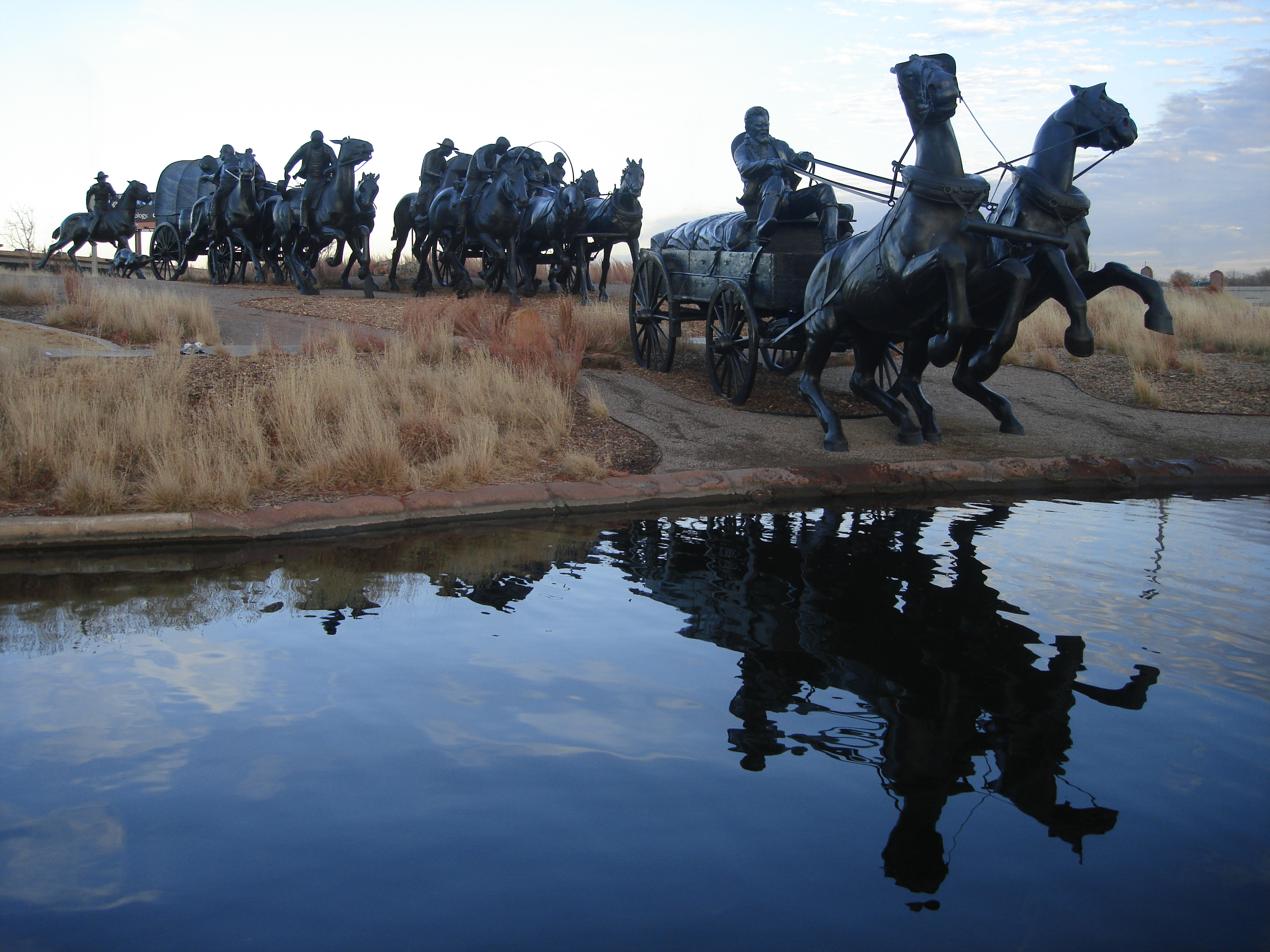
- The installation in 2011
- Location: Oklahoma City, Oklahoma, U.S.
- 35.461114°N 97.505198°W

The Centennial Land Run Monument is an art installation by Paul Moore, located in the Oklahoma City Bricktown District, in the U.S. state of Oklahoma. It commemorates the Land Run of 1889 in the Unassigned Lands.

== Sculpture ==
The sculpture was erected in 2019 and features either 45 or 47 bronze statues, each one being "one-and-a-half times life-size". The work depicts "horsemen and wagons racing over the Oklahoma landscape", with a total area slightly "larger than a football field".

According to its commemorative plaque, it is meant to "[pay] tribute to the courageous settlers who on April 22, 1889" as well as "present day pioneers who, through their untiring dedication to this project, have immortalized a defining moment in [Oklahoma]’s epic creation".

== History ==
Paul Moore completed the sculpture in 2019; it took over 20 years to complete the project.

In October 2020, the National Sculpture Society awarded Moore the Medal of Honor for his work, praising the "quality of sculpture" as well as his "extraordinary [talent]".

=== Protests ===
==== July 11, 2020 ====
On July 11, 2020, the local Society to Protect Indigenous Rights and Treaties (SPIRIT) held a sit-in at the land run monument. This occurred days after the Supreme Court's McGirt v. Oklahoma decision, on July 9, 2020. The peaceful protest called attention to the monuments' erasure of the Muscogee Nation and Oklahoma's Native American history. The event was co-sponsored by Oklahoma City's Black Lives Matter chapter. Whites Against Racism also joined to "help provide a shield against anyone who might try to disrupt the meeting", which occurred when a group of all-white counter-protestors attempted to disrupt the event.

Choctaw activist Isabella Aiukli Cornell was among the speakers. Like many others, she described a 1st-grade experience of being forced to participate in a land-run reenactment that involved planting a flag on lands to claim it, and stating that even as a child she was aware that the activity "wasn't right". Other speakers described how, as Native American students, they were "made to sit in the school office - usually associated with being in trouble - while the rest of the students participated in the [reenactment] activity", which led to further isolation from their classmates.

Counter-protestors, all of whom were white, "some armed with handguns and two with rifles", arrived in order to protect the monument from being torn down. Although SPIRIT organizers repeatedly stated that they had no intention to tear down the statue, counter-protestors believed "Antifa or Black Lives Matter might show up and attempt" to topple the statue, similar to what occurred with the United Confederate Veterans Memorial statue earlier that month in Seattle. When vandalism did not occur, the counter-protestors heckled the event, particularly once Black Lives Matter-Oklahoma executive director and co-founder Rev. T. Sheri Dickerson began to speak. Nevertheless, no physical violence or vandalism occurred.

==== Other protests ====
In an unknown year, a faculty member with the Zinn Education Project has also protested the statue.

=== Opinions and recommendations ===
Since at least 2020, SPIRIT has collected input from local residents regarding their opinions of the statue and to propose changes for its future. For example, one resident wrote that the statue "feels like a celebration of colonization, of the stealing of Indigenous land and disenfranchisement of [Native] people, and like a whitewashing of history that overlooks how that land came to be open for white settlers". Residents also described what they'd prefer to see added. One recommended the addition of "a space with Native art that celebrates our past, present, and future" with "QR codes that provide more historical context of the removal treaties", while still expressing a preference for Moore's monument to be taken down.

However, overall, SPIRIT "[envisions] a process that would involve Indigenous historians, authors and artists collaborating on a new public monument that would add to the story already being told, not eliminate or replace it" (i.e., a form of cultural counterspeech).
