= First National Bank Building (Tulsa, Oklahoma) =

Commercial high-rise building in Tulsa, Oklahoma

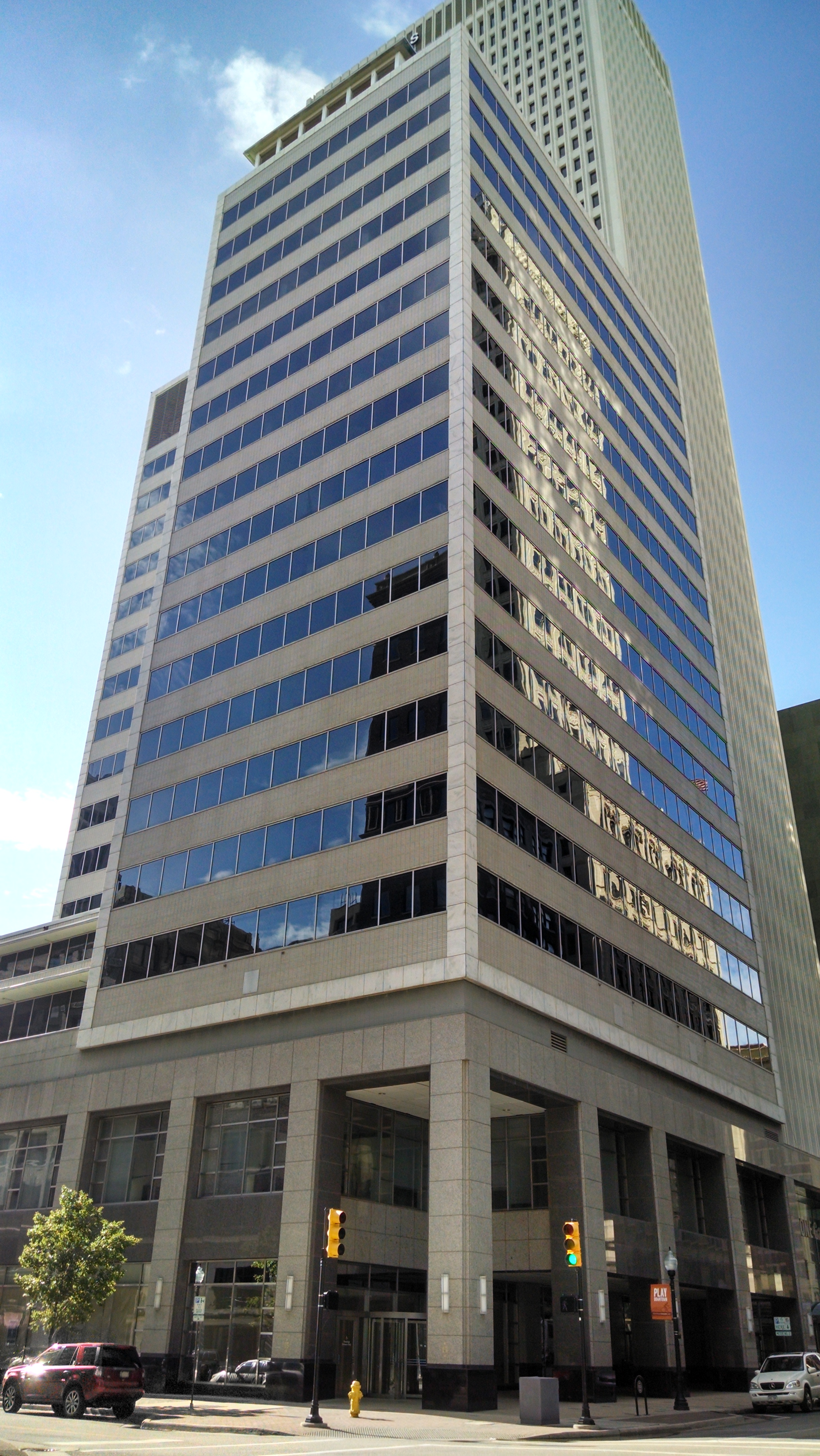
- Interactive map of the First National Bank Building area

General information
- Status: Completed
- Type: Office
- Location: 15 East Fifth Street, Tulsa, Oklahoma, United States
- Coordinates: 36°09′07″N 95°59′21″W
- Completed: 1950
- Opening: 1950

Height
- Roof: 250 ft (76 m)

Technical details
- Floor count: 20

Design and construction
- Architect: Carson & Lundin

The First National Bank Building is a commercial high-rise building in Tulsa, Oklahoma. The building rises 250 feet (76 m) in downtown Tulsa. It contains 20 floors, and was completed in 1950. The First National Bank Building currently stands as the 15th-tallest building in the city, and the 30th-tallest building in the state of Oklahoma. The architectural firm who designed the building was Carson & Lundin. It currently stands as the 7th-tallest modern style skyscraper in the city, behind the Cityplex Tower, the First Place Tower, the University Club Tower, Cityplex West Tower, the Liberty Towers complex and the Boulder Towers complex. The First National Bank Building notably stands as the first modern style high-rise to be built in Tulsa, and was the only skyscraper to be constructed in the city between 1928, when the 320 South Boston Building was completed, and 1960, when Boulder Towers West Tower was constructed.

== See also ==
- List of tallest buildings in Tulsa
- Buildings of Tulsa
