= Buildings of Tulsa, Oklahoma =

Tulsa is a hub of art deco and contemporary architecture, and most buildings of Tulsa are in either of these two styles. Prominent buildings include the BOK Tower, the second tallest building in Oklahoma; the futurist Oral Roberts University campus and adjacent Cityplex Towers, a group of towers that includes the third tallest building in Oklahoma; Boston Avenue Methodist Church, an Art Deco church designated as a National Historic Landmark; and the BOK Center, an 18,000-seat arena in downtown Tulsa.

== Skyscrapers and highrises ==
Buildings	Height in feet	Stories	Image
BOK Tower	667	52	
Cityplex	648	60	
First Place Tower	516	41	
Mid-Continent Tower	513	36	
Arvest Tower	412	32	
320 South Boston Building	400	22	
110 West 7th Building	388	28	
University Club Tower	377	32	
Cityplex West Tower	348	30	
Philtower	343	24	
Liberty Towers	254	23	No Picture Available
Boulder Towers	253	15	
Mayo Hotel	252	18	
First National Bank	250	20	
Cityplex East Tower	248	20	
Remington Tower	232	18	No Picture Available
Thompson Building	215	15	
2300 Riverside Apartments	176	16	

== Auditoriums, arenas, and theaters ==
1910 to 1919
Image	Building	Date	Architect	Notes
	Lyric Theatre, 103 S. Main St.	built 1891		(800 seats) Tulsa's first masonry theatre structure, presented vaudeville & motion pictures until converted to retail use in 1959. Demolished by Urban Renewal 1971.
	Grand Opera House, 115 E. 2nd St.	Built in 1906	John Eberson	(1,200 seats) Converted to furniture store, then an auction house. Demolished for Urban Renewal project 1973.
	Orpheum Theater, 12 E. 4th St.	1924	John Eberson	(1,600 seats) Originally a Vaudeville theater. Converted to movie theater in 1931. Held world premiers for The Song of Bernadette and Tulsa. Demolished in 1970.
	Tulsa Theater	1912-14, remodeled 1930, additions 1952	1930 remodel, Bruce Goff	Still in use as 3200 seat performing arts center.
	Majestic Theater, 406 S. Main St.	1917		(1,000 seats) Beau Arts style. First theater in Tulsa designed for movies, first in Tulsa with sound system, and first in Tulsa with Pipe Organ. Showed first talkie in Tulsa and first 3D movie in Tulsa. Destroyed by fire in 1973.
	Rialto Theater, 7 W. 3rd St.(AKA-Orpheum)	1917	John Eberson	(1,400 seats) This was Tulsa's second Rialto, first sat next door at 13 W. 3rd. First theater in Tulsa to have air-conditioning. Demolished 1971.
	Akdar Theatre, (Cimarron Ballroom), 221 W. 4th St.	1925	George & Leo Rapp	(1,800 seats) Built in exotic Moorish & Roccoco style. Converted to ballroom use 1946. Demolished in 1965.
	Ritz Theater, 18 W. 4th St.	1926	John Eberson	(1,600 seats) Italian style atmospheric theater, demolished in 1963. Remaining Ritz Building demolished in 1973
	Fairgrounds Pavilion, Tulsa State Fairgrounds	1932	Leland I Shumway	(6,000 seats) Art Deco PWA. Photo looking west in the 1960s toward downtown Tulsa skyline
	Cain's Ballroom	1924		Listed on the National Register of Historic Places.
	Tulsa Coliseum, 502 S Elgin Ave.	1928	Leon Senter	(4,200 seats) Destroyed by fire September 1952
	Circle Cinema, 10 S. Lewis Ave.	1928		(800 seats) Listed on the National Register of Historic Places.
	State Theater, 118 S. Main	Opened 1911 as Wonderland Nickelodeon	1935 Art Deco remodel by Joseph R. Koberling, Jr.	(400 seats) Art Deco (Streamline style). Converted to retail store 1955. Demolished 1973
	Loew's Delman Theater, 2335 E. 15th St.	1938	W. Scott Dunne	(1,400 seats) Art Deco (Streamline style). Closed 1980. Demolished 2008.
	Tulsa Theatre, 215 S. Main St.	1941	Jack Corgan & William J. Moore	(1,000 seats) Art Deco (Streamline style). Demolished by Urban Renewal 1971.
	Will Rogers Theater, 4502 East 11th Street	1941	Jack Corgan	(900 seats) Southwestern style Art Deco (Streamline style). Demolished 1977
	Loew's Brook Theatre, 3307 South Peoria Avenue	1945	Willim H.C. Calderwood	(800 seats) Art Deco (Streamline style) Ceased movie presentation in 1983, and has since been converted to a restaurant.
	Big Ten Ballroom (American Beauty), 1632 East Apache Street	1950		Art Deco (Streamline style).
	Mabee Center, Oral Roberts University, 81st and Lewis	1972	Frank Wallace	
	Cox Business Center, formerly known as Tulsa Convention Center, 6th and Houston	1964		
	Tulsa Performing Arts Center	1977	Minoru Yamasaki	
	University of Tulsa, Reynolds Center	1998		
	BOK Center	2008	César Pelli	

== See also ==
- Tulsa, Oklahoma
- National Register of Historic Places listings in Oklahoma
- List of Art Deco buildings in Tulsa, Oklahoma
