= The Westin at Tulsa Garden Square =

General information
- Status: Proposed
- Type: Hotel, Residential
- Location: Tulsa, Oklahoma, United States
- Coordinates: 36°09′10″N 95°59′39″W
- Estimated completion: 2010

Technical details
- Floor count: 15

Design and construction
- Developer: Westin Hotels

The Westin at Tulsa Garden Square is a high-rise building proposed for construction in Tulsa, Oklahoma. The building was submitted to the Tulsa Development Authority on April 20, 2006, and is planned to be constructed adjacent to the recently completed BOK Center in downtown Tulsa. The proposed structure covered the city block bounded by Second to Third Streets and Cheyenne to Denver Avenues. The proposal also requested demolition of an apartment building and a small office building then on the property, and relocation of the Tulsa Transit Denver Avenue bus terminal. If constructed, the Westin at Tulsa Garden Square would contain a 246-room Westin hotel, as well as 72 residential condominiums. The 15-story building would likely stand as the 2nd-tallest hotel in Tulsa upon completion, behind the Mayo Hotel.

The Westin at Tulsa Garden Square is currently the only skyscraper proposed for construction in Tulsa; there are no other high-rise developments currently taking place in the city. The hotel has not yet received approval from the city and was last reported in 2007 as being reviewed by the Tulsa Development Authority.

== See also ==
- List of tallest buildings in Tulsa
- Buildings of Tulsa
