= List of tallest buildings in Tulsa =

Skyline of Tulsa
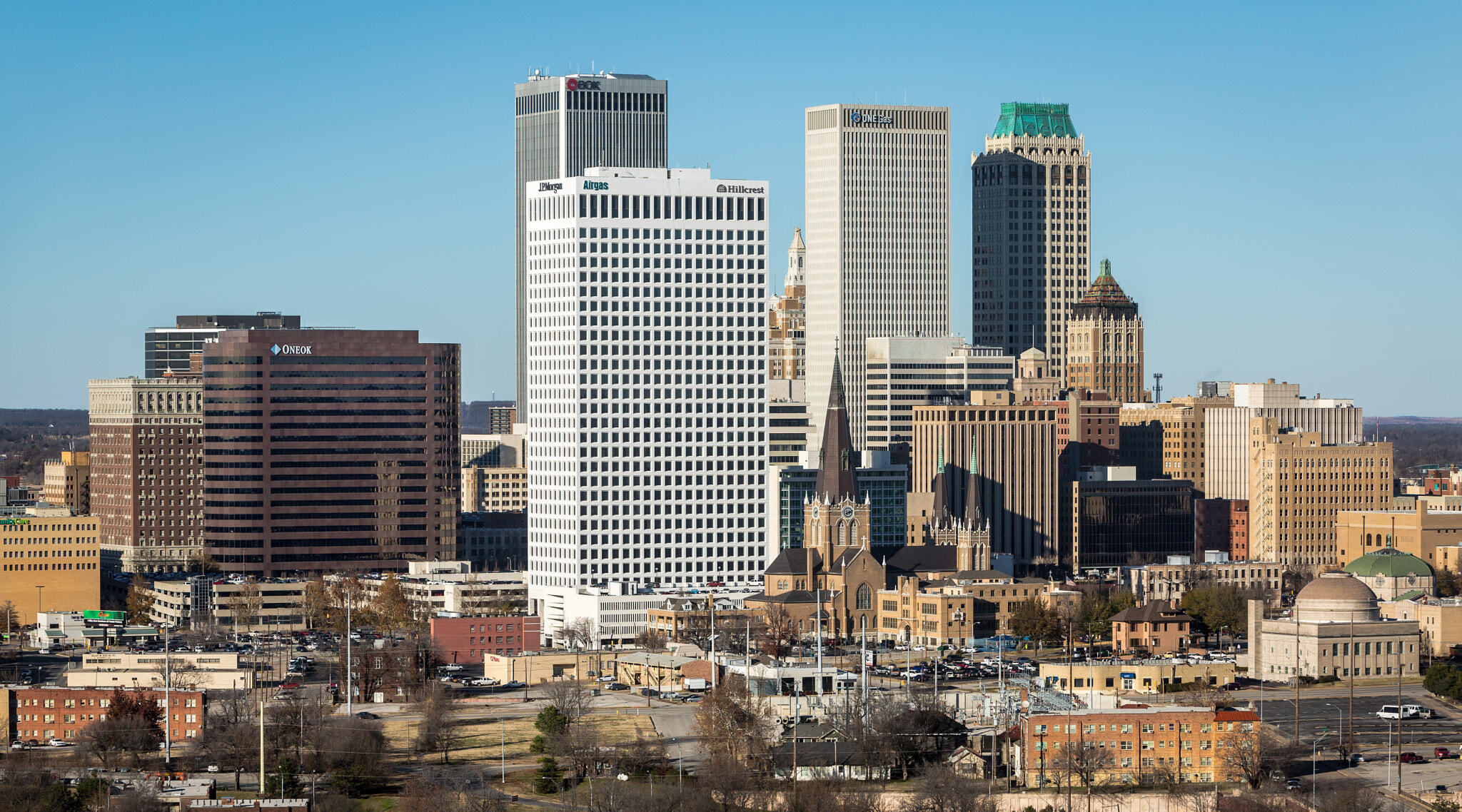
- Downtown Tulsa in 2015
- Tallest building: BOK Tower (1975)
- Tallest building height: 667 ft (203.3 m)
- First 150 m+ building: BOK Tower

Number of tall buildings (2026)
- Taller than 100 m (328 ft): 10
- Taller than 150 m (492 ft): 4
- Taller than 200 m (656 ft): 1

Number of tall buildings — feet
- Taller than 200 ft (61.0 m): 28
- Taller than 300 ft (91.4 m): 12

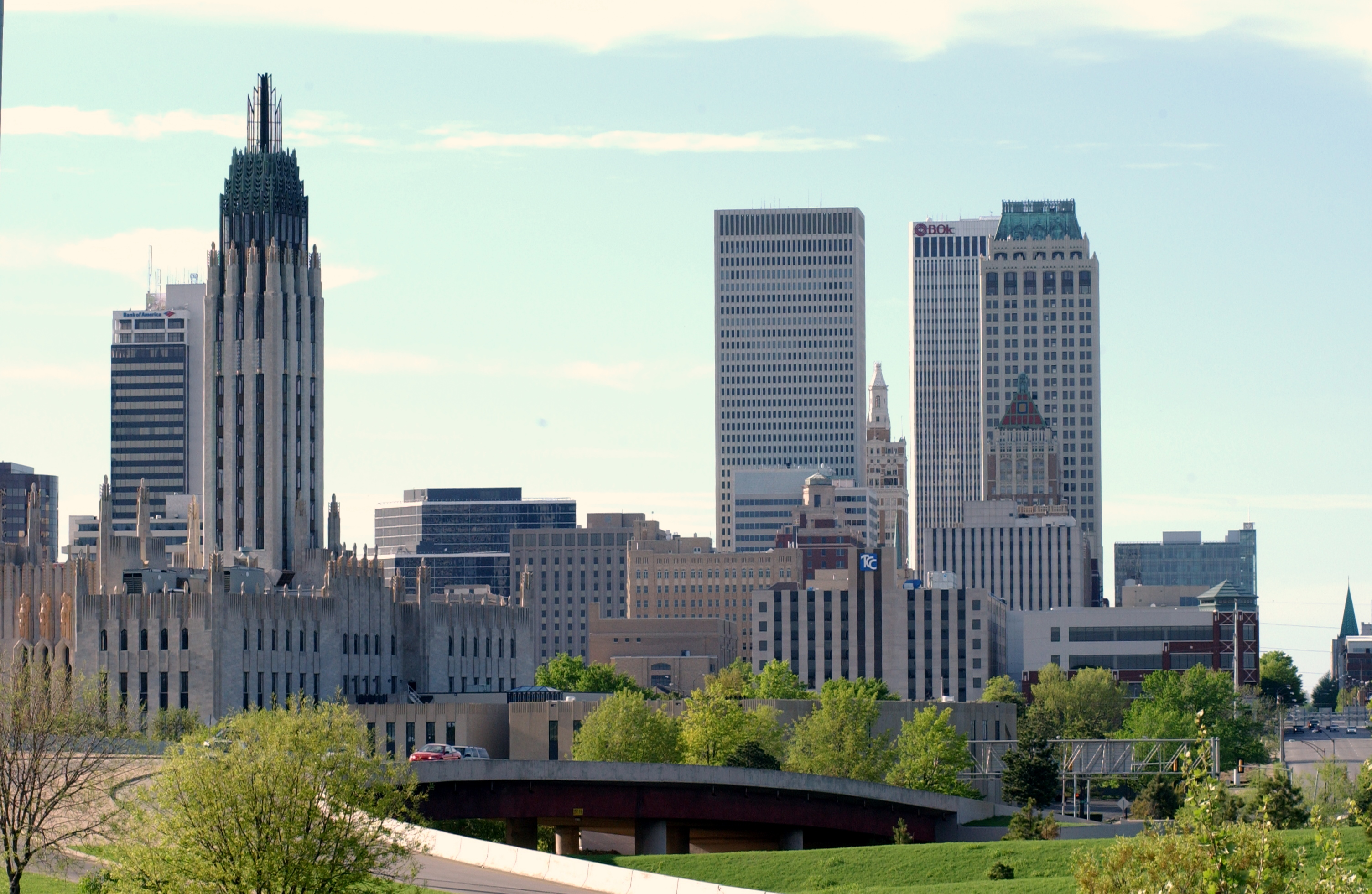
Skyline of Tulsa, looking northwest with the Boston Avenue Methodist Church in the foreground

Tulsa is the second largest city in the U.S. state of Oklahoma, with a metropolitan area population of approximately 1 million. Tulsa is the site of 28 buildings that stand taller than 200 feet (61 m), 12 of which are taller than 300 feet (91 m) as of 2026. Four skyscrapers reach a height of 492 feet (150 m). On these metrics, Tulsa ranks as the largest skyline in the state, ahead of Oklahoma City. The tallest building in Tulsa is the BOK Tower, which rises 667 feet (203 m) in Downtown Tulsa and was completed in 1975. BOK Tower is the second tallest building in Oklahoma, after Devon Energy Center in Oklahoma City. Tulsa and Oklahoma City contain the majority of Oklahoma's tallest buildings.

Among the earliest high-rises to be built in Tulsa was the 16-story Cosden Building in 1918, regarded as the first skyscraper in Tulsa. The city went through an early building boom in the 1920s, resulting in the construction of notable high-rises such as the Mayo Hotel, the Mincks-Adams Hotel, the Thompson Building, and the Philtower, alongside an addition to the 320 South Boston Building, bringing it to a height of 400 ft (122 m), then the tallest in the city. There were no high-rises built in the 1930s and 1940s. The First National Bank Building, completed in 1950, marked the first modern style high-rise in the Tulsa. The 1960s saw an increase in skyscraper development. The Bank of America Center took the title of the city's tallest building in 1967, while two notable residential towers were built south of downtown: Liberty Tower and the cylindrical University Club Tower.

This trend continued into the 1970s as the BOK Tower was completed in 1975, remaining the tallest building in the city since. That same year also saw the completion of First Place Tower. The CityPlex Towers are a complex of three high-rise buildings constructed in south Tulsa between 1979 and 1981. Conceived of by televangelist Oral Roberts, the complex was initially intended to be a major charismatic Christian hospital. The tallest of the towers rises 648 ft (198 m) and is the second tallest building in Tulsa. The early 1980s saw a surge in high-rise construction, including the addition of a 20-story structure to the Cosden Building (now the Mid-Continent Tower), bringing its height to 513 ft (156 m), the fourth tallest in the city. Skyscraper construction halted in the mid-1980s following the city's oil bust. Since then, few high-rises have been built in Tulsa, leaving the city's skyline relatively unchanged in the following four decades.

Most of Tulsa's tallest buildings are situated in Downtown Tulsa, which is bounded by Interstate 244 to the north and west, and U.S Route 75 to the south and east. Besides the CityPlex Towers, other buildings taller than 200 ft (61 m) located outside of downtown include the Warren Place complex, the River Spirit Casino Resort, and Remington Tower, which was heavily damaged by the 2017 Tulsa tornadoes and was converted into apartments in 2024.

== History ==
Number of buildings by height in Tulsa by the end of each year, based on the information in this article. This takes into account the height increases of three buildings after initial construction: the Mid-Continent Tower, the 320 South Boston Building, and the Thompson Building. Click on the legend to toggle a specific height on or off. View chart definition.

== Map of tallest buildings ==
The map below shows the location of buildings taller than 200 ft (61 m) in Downtown Tulsa and the neighborhoods of Riverview and Oakshire. Each marker is numbered by the building's height rank, and colored by the decade of its completion.

Buildings taller than 200 ft (61 m) in Tulsa. An asterisk (*) next to the building's name indicates it is located outside the map.
- 1950s and before
- 1960s
- 1970s
- 1980s
- 1990s
- 2000s
- 2010s
1 BOK Tower
2 Cityplex Central Tower*
3 First Place Tower
4 Mid-Continent Tower
5 Arvest Tower
6 320 South Boston Building
7 110 West 7th Building
8 University Club Tower
9 Cityplex West Tower*
10 Philtower
11 Williams Center Tower II
12 River Spirit Casino*
13 One Warren Place*
14 Two Warren Place*
15 OneOK Plaza
16 One Place Tower
17 Liberty Tower
18 Reese Tower*
19 Boulder Towers
20 The Mayo Hotel
21 DoubleTree Hotel Tulsa-Downtown
22 Holy Family Cathedral
23 First National Bank Building
24 Cityplex East Tower*
25 Williams Center Tower I
26 Boston Avenue Methodist Church
27 Thompson Building
28 One Technology Center

== Cityscape ==
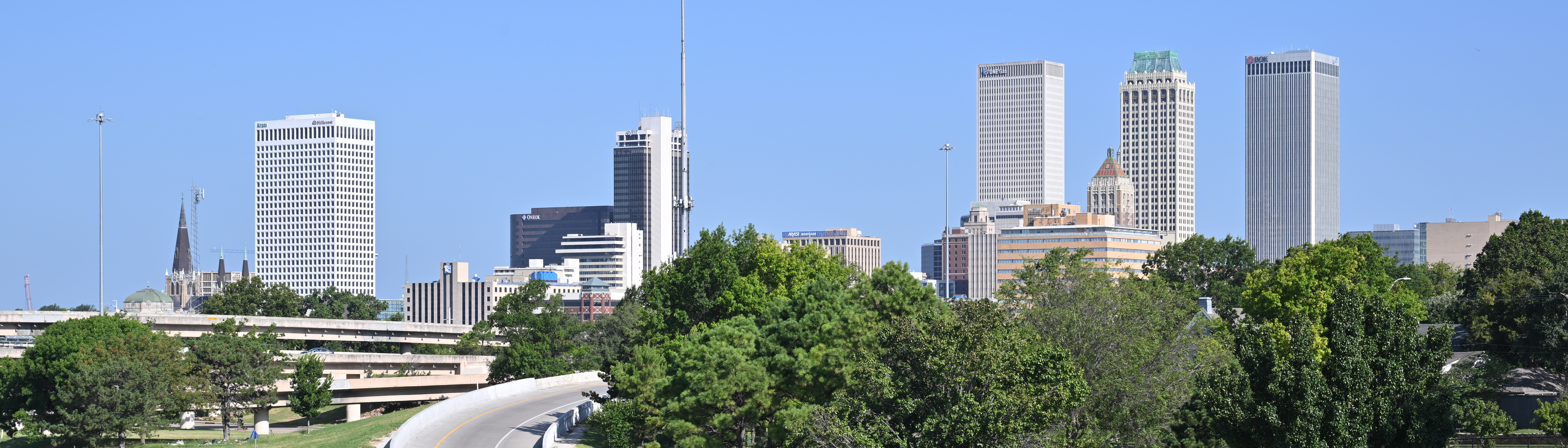
Skyline of Tulsa from a bridge over U.S. Route 64 in 2025

== Tallest buildings ==
This list ranks completed buildings in Tulsa that stand at least 200 ft (61 m) tall as of 2026, based on standard height measurement. This includes spires and architectural details but does not include antenna masts. The “Year” column indicates the year of completion. Buildings tied in height are sorted by year of completion with earlier buildings ranked first, and then alphabetically.

Was the tallest building in Tulsa upon completion

Rank	Name	Image	Location	Height ft (m)	Floors	Year	Purpose	Notes
1	BOK Tower		36°09′19″N 95°59′26″W	667 (203.3)	52	1975	Office	Second tallest building in Oklahoma. Tallest building completed in Tulsa in the 1970s. Tallest office building in Tulsa. Headquarters of the BOK Financial Corporation. Its design was based on Tower 1 of the World Trade Center in New York City.
2	Cityplex Central Tower		36°02′36″N 95°57′13″W	648 (197.5)	60	1979	Office	Third tallest building in Oklahoma. Tallest building in Tulsa outside of Downtown Tulsa. The tallest of the CityPlex Towers, a complex of three office towers.
3	First Place Tower		36°09′08″N 95°59′22″W	516 (157.3)	40	1975	Office	Fourth tallest building in Oklahoma.
4	Mid-Continent Tower		36°09′10″N 95°59′20″W	513 (156.4)	36	1984 (Note: Originally constructed at a height of 16 floors in 1918, the building's height was extended in 1984.)	Office	Fifth tallest building in Oklahoma. Originally constructed as a 184 ft (56 m) tall, 16-story building in 1918, then known as the Cosden Building. As the Cosden Building, it was the tallest high-rise in Tulsa from 1918 to 1925. A further 20 stories were added in 1984, bringing the total number of stories to 36.
5	Arvest Tower		36°09′02″N 95°59′26″W	412 (125.6)	32	1967	Office	Formerly known as the Bank of America Center. Tallest building completed in Tulsa in the 1960s. Tallest building in Tulsa from 1967 to 1975.
6	320 South Boston Building		36°09′11″N 95°59′23″W	400 (121.9)	22	1928 (Note: Originally constructed at a height of 10 floors in 1917, the building's height was extended in 1928.)	Office	Formerly known as the National Bank of Tulsa Building. The 320 South Boston Building was originally constructed at a height of 10 floors in 1917. The building's height was extended in 1928 to its present height. Tallest building in Tulsa from 1928 to 1967.
7	110 West 7th Building		36°08′55″N 95°59′26″W	388 (118.3)	28	1971	Office	
8	University Club Tower		36°08′14″N 95°59′28″W	377 (115)	31	1966	Residential	Tallest residential building in Tulsa.
9	Cityplex West Tower		36°02′34″N 95°57′15″W	348 (106.1)	30	1981	Health	Tallest building completed in Tulsa in the 1980s, if the Mid-Continental Tower is excluded. Part of the CityPlex Towers, a complex of three office towers.
10	Philtower		36°09′08″N 95°59′19″W	343 (104.5)	24	1927	Mixed-use	Tallest building completed in Tulsa in the 1920s, if the 320 South Boston Building is excluded. Tallest building in Tulsa briefly from 1927 to 1928. Originally an office building, it was converted into a mixed-use office and residential building in 2004.
11	Williams Center Tower II		36°09′14″N 95°59′32″W	324 (98.7)	23	1983	Office	
12	River Spirit Casino	–	36°02′28″N 95°57′51″W	317 (96.7)	27	2016	Hotel	A casino resort near the Arkansas River. Owned and operated by the Muscogee Nation. Tallest building completed in Tulsa in the 2010s.
13	One Warren Place		36°04′23″N 95°55′23″W	284 (86.6)	20	1983	Office	Located in the city's southeast, outside of Downtown Tulsa.
14	Two Warren Place		36°04′27″N 95°55′31″W	274 (83.5)	19	1986	Office	Located in the city's southeast, outside of Downtown Tulsa.
15	OneOK Plaza		36°09′02″N 95°59′30″W	266 (81)	17	1984	Office	
16	One Place Tower	—	36°09′11″N 95°59′39″W	255 (77.7)	17	2013	Office	Also known as Cimarex Energy Tower.
17	Liberty Tower		36°08′24″N 95°59′19″W	254 (77.4)	23	1965	Residential	
18	Reese Tower		36°06′09″N 95°54′39″W	254 (77.3)	18	1984	Residential	Located in the city's southeast, outside of Downtown Tulsa. Originally built as Remington Tower, an office building. Heavily damaged by the 2017 Tulsa tornadoes; the building was hence unoccupied between 2017 and 2024. Converted into residential use in 2024.
19	Boulder Towers		36°08′28″N 95°59′16″W	253 (77.1)	15	1960	Office	The first tower was built from 1959 to 1960 by Skelly, the second in 1980 by Texaco. The towers are connected and count as a single building for the purposes of this list.
20	The Mayo Hotel		36°09′03″N 95°59′32″W	252 (76.8)	19	1925	Hotel	Tallest building in Tulsa briefly from 1925 to 1927.
21	DoubleTree Hotel Tulsa-Downtown	—	36°08′51″N 95°59′46″W	252 (76.8)	18	1981	Hotel	
22	Holy Family Cathedral		36°08′52″N 95°59′25″W	251 (76.5)	1	1914	Religious	Tallest religious building in Tulsa. Tallest building in Tulsa from 1914 to 1925.
23	First National Bank Building		36°09′07″N 95°59′21″W	250 (76.2)	20	1950	Office	Tallest building completed in Tulsa in the 1950s.
24	Cityplex East Tower		36°02′34″N 95°57′10″W	248 (75.6)	20	1981	Health	The shortest of the CityPlex Towers, a complex of three office towers.
25	Williams Center Tower I		36°09′12″N 95°59′32″W	230 (70)	17	1982	Office	
26	Boston Avenue Methodist Church		36°08′38″N 95°59′05″W	225 (68.5)	15	1929	Religious	
27	Thompson Building		36°09′05″N 95°59′20″W	215 (65.5)	15	1929 (Note: Originally constructed in 1923 as a 10-story building. Five additional stories were added in 1929, bringing the building to its current height.)	Office	Originally constructed in 1923 as a 10-story building. Five additional stories were added in 1929, bringing the building to its current height.
28	One Technology Center		36°09′20″N 95°59′24″W	211 (64.4)	15	2001	Office	

== Tallest under construction or proposed ==
=== Under construction ===
As of 2026, there are no buildings planned to be taller than 200 ft (61 m) that are under construction in Tulsa. The most recent building constructed taller than that height is the River Spirit Casino, which was completed in 2016.

=== Proposed ===
As of 2026, there are no approved or proposed buildings planned to be taller than 200 ft (61 m) in Tulsa.

== Timeline of tallest buildings ==
Since 1918, the year the first high-rise in the city was constructed, the title of the tallest building in Tulsa has been held by six high-rises.

Original name	Image	Years as tallest	Height ft (m)	Floors	Reference
Holy Family Cathedral		1914–1925 (11 years)	251 (76.5)	1	
Mayo Hotel		1925–1927 (2 years)	252 (76.8)	18	
Philtower		1927–1928 (1 year)	343 (104.5)	24	
320 South Boston Building		1928–1967 (39 years)	400 (121.9)	22	
Bank of America Center		1967–1975 (8 years)	412 (125.6)	32	
BOK Tower		1975–present (51 years)	667 (203.3)	52	

== See also ==
- List of tallest buildings in Oklahoma
- List of tallest buildings in Oklahoma City
- List of Art Deco buildings in Tulsa
- Buildings of Tulsa
