= List of tallest buildings in Oklahoma =

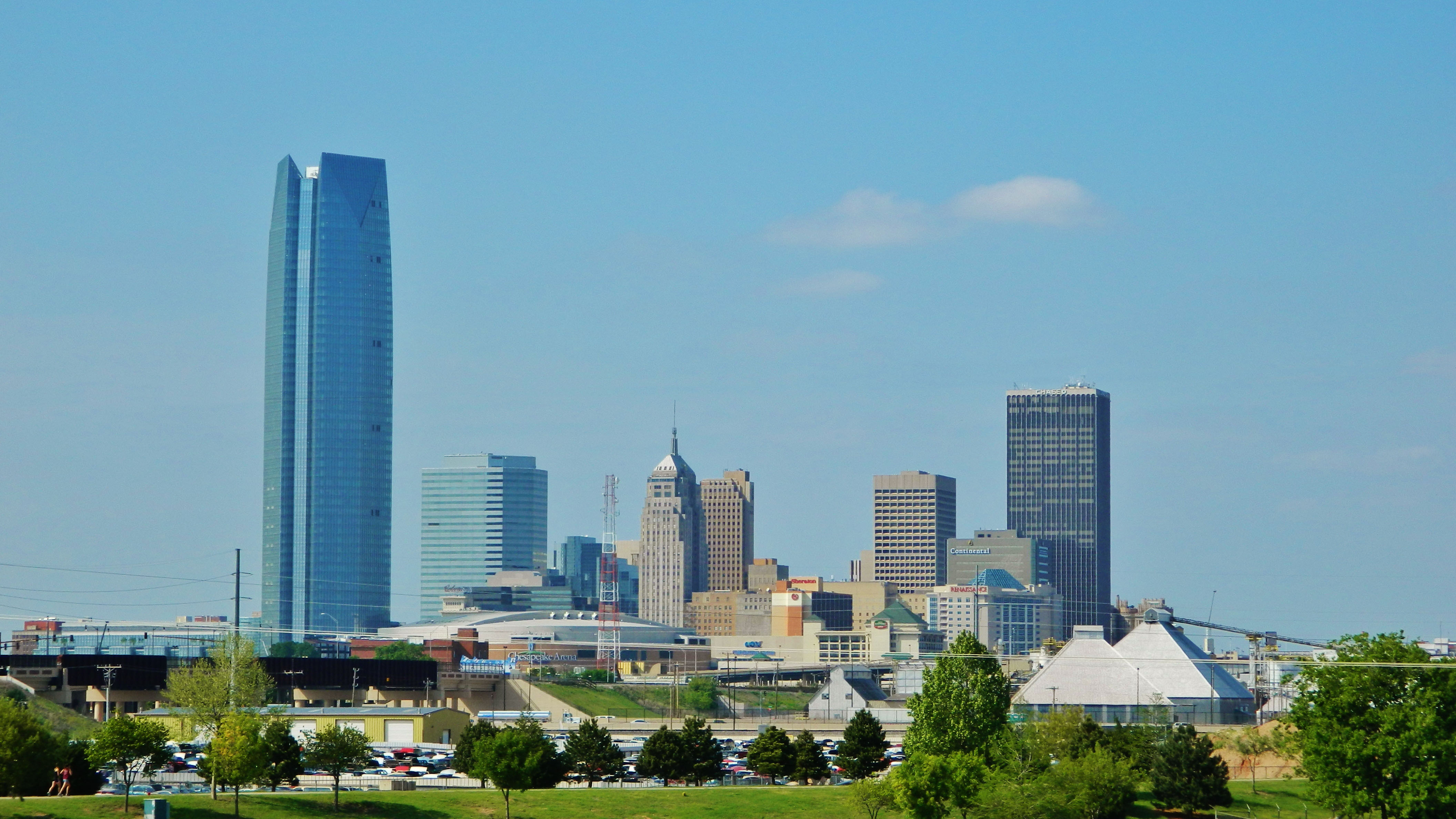
Oklahoma City skyline (2012)

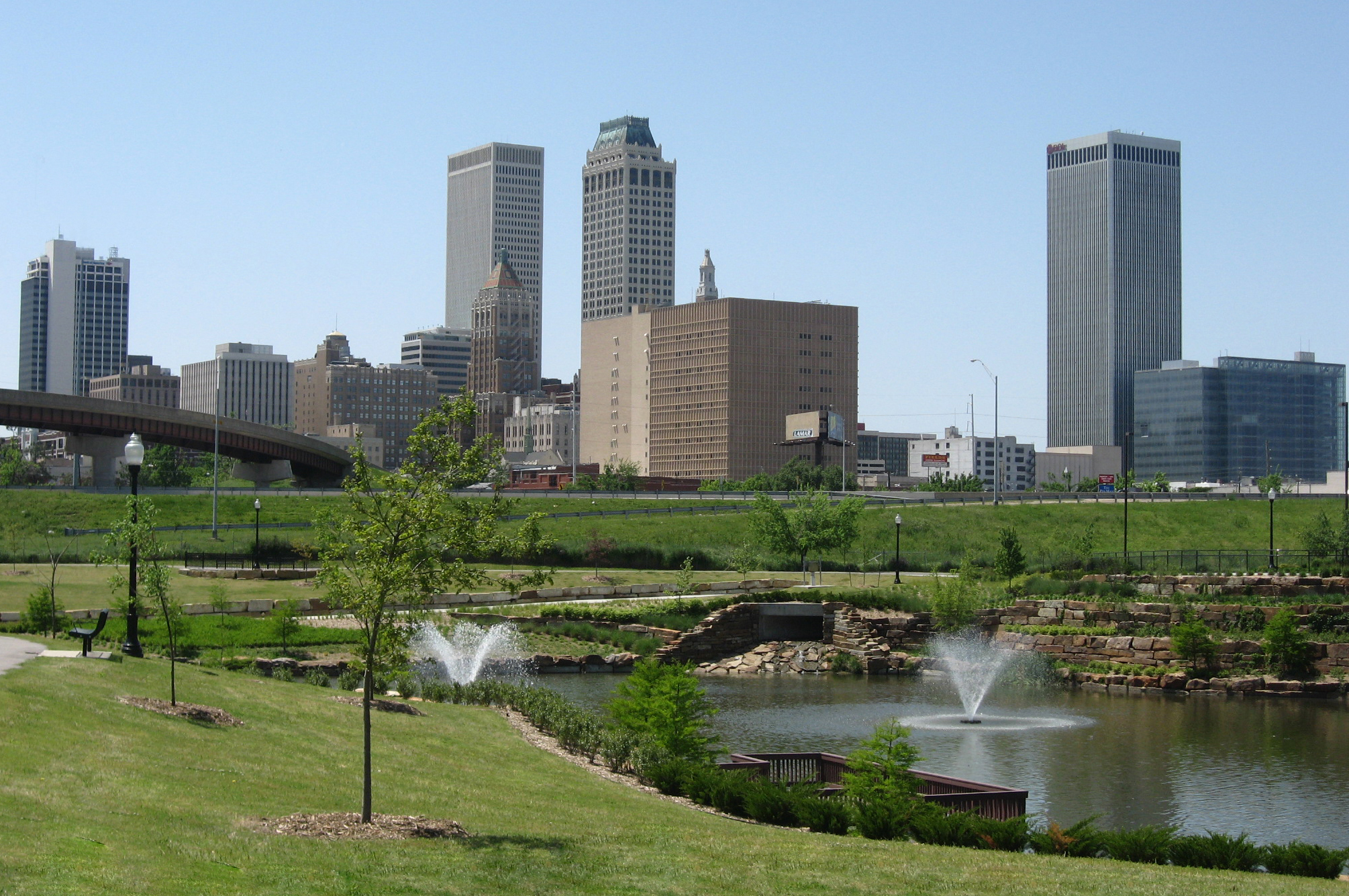
Tulsa skyline

This list of tallest buildings in Oklahoma ranks skyscrapers and highrises in the US state of Oklahoma by height. The tallest building in Oklahoma is the Devon Energy Center in Oklahoma City, which contains 50 floors and is 844 ft (257 m) tall. It is tied with the Park Tower in Chicago for the 43rd tallest building in the United States. The second-tallest building in the state is the BOK Tower in Tulsa, which rises 667 feet (203 m) above the ground.

== Tallest buildings ==
Was the tallest building in Oklahoma upon completion

The following is a list of buildings in Oklahoma over 115 meters in height. All buildings listed here are in Oklahoma City or Tulsa: seven buildings in Oklahoma City and eight in Tulsa. The tallest building in Oklahoma outside these two cities is the Phillips Petroleum Building in Bartlesville, Oklahoma at 292 ft.

Rank	Name	Image	City	Height feet / m	Floors	Year	Notes
1	Devon Energy Center		Oklahoma City	844 ft (257 m)	50	2012	Topped out on September 21, 2011. Officially tallest building in Oklahoma. Tallest building between Chicago and Dallas and to the west excluding California, Texas and Seattle. First tallest building to be built in Oklahoma City in the 21st century.
2	BOK Tower		Tulsa	667 feet (203 m)	52	1976	Was the tallest building in Oklahoma from its completion in 1976 until 2011. It is now the 2nd tallest building in Oklahoma. Formerly known as One Williams Center.
3	Cityplex Tower		Tulsa	648 feet (198 m)	60	1979	Stood as the tallest hospital in the state and in the world upon completion, but later converted into office space. Stands as the 3rd-tallest building in the state. Tulsa's tallest building located outside of downtown and tallest building in the CityPlex complex.
4	First Place Tower		Tulsa	516 feet (157 m)	41	1974	2nd-tallest building in downtown Tulsa. 4th-tallest building in Oklahoma.
5	Mid-Continent Tower		Tulsa	513 feet (156 m)	36	1984	Originally constructed in 1918 as a 16-story building; 20 additional stories were cantilevered above the existing structure after a 1980 restoration. 5th-tallest building in the state. Most recently completed skyscraper in the city. Formerly known as the Cosden Building.
6	BancFirst Tower		Oklahoma City	500 feet (152 m)	36	1971	6th-tallest in the state of Oklahoma. Tallest in the state from 1971–1975, tallest in Oklahoma City for 40 years from 1971–2011.
7	First National Center		Oklahoma City	446 feet (136 m)	33	1931	7th-tallest building in Oklahoma; tallest building in Oklahoma and Oklahoma City from 1931-1971.
8	BOK Park Plaza		Oklahoma City	433 feet (132 m)	27	2018	8th-tallest building in Oklahoma and the 4th-tallest in Oklahoma City. Bank of Oklahoma anchors the tower's upper floors.
9	Arvest Tower		Tulsa	412 feet (126 m)	32	1967	
10	Oklahoma Tower		Oklahoma City	410 feet (125 m)	31	1982	6th-tallest building in Oklahoma City.
11	320 South Boston Building		Tulsa	400 feet (122 m)	22	1928	
12	Strata Tower		Oklahoma City	393 feet (120 m)	30	1973	Home office of the Oklahoma State Department of Health. 6th-tallest building in Oklahoma City; former corporate headquarters of Kerr-McGee and SandRidge Energy Corporation.
13	City Place Tower		Oklahoma City	391 feet (119 m)	33	1931	7th-tallest building in Oklahoma City; tallest building in Oklahoma City for a brief period in 1931.
14	110 West 7th Building		Tulsa	388 feet (118 m)	28	1971	7th-tallest in Tulsa.
15	University Club Towers		Tulsa	377 feet (115 m)	32	1966	8th-tallest in Tulsa. Tallest residential building in Tulsa.

== See also ==
- List of tallest buildings in Oklahoma City
- List of tallest buildings in Tulsa
- List of tallest buildings by U.S. state
- List of tallest buildings in the United States
