= Thompson Building =

Historical high-rise building in Tulsa, Oklahoma

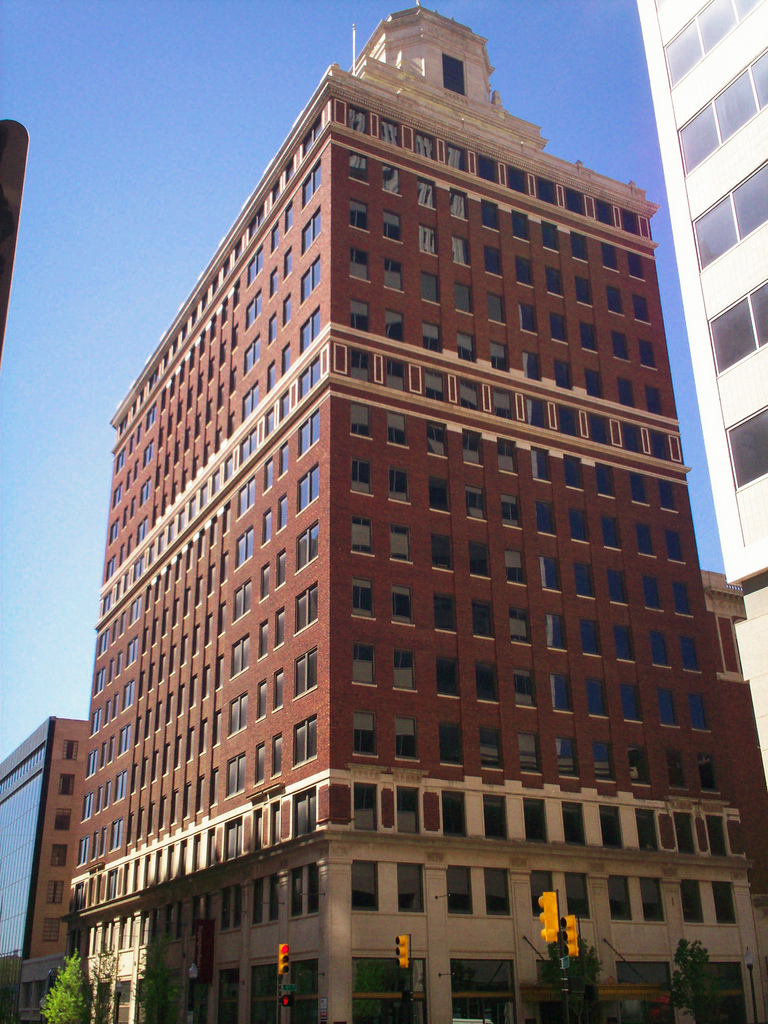
- The Thompson Building in downtown Tulsa
- Interactive map of the Thompson Building area

General information
- Type: Office
- Location: 20 East Fifth Street, Tulsa, Oklahoma, United States
- Coordinates: 36°09′05″N 95°59′20″W
- Completed: 1923, 1929
- Opening: 1923

Height
- Roof: 215 ft (66 m)

Technical details
- Floor count: 15

Design and construction
- Architect: Arthur M. Atkinson

The Thompson Building is a historic high-rise building in Tulsa, Oklahoma. The building rises 215 feet (66 m) in downtown Tulsa. It contains 15 floors, and was completed in 1923. The First National Bank Building currently stands as the 17th-tallest building in the city, and the 36th-tallest building in the state of Oklahoma. The architect who designed the building was Arthur M. Atkinson.

The Thompson Building was originally constructed in 1923 as a 10-story low-rise commercial building by brothers William, Jay, and Roy Thompson to serve as the business home for their ranches—a role the building fulfilled for 58 years. When Tidewater Oil and Gas approached the Thompson brothers in 1929 seeking office space in downtown Tulsa, the brothers hired Rucks-Brandt Construction to add five additional floors to the structure as well as a copper-tiled steeple reaching another five floors, bringing the high-rise to its present height. The building was constructed in the Beaux Arts architectural style, and is the 2nd-tallest Beaux Arts high-rise in Tulsa, after the Mayo Hotel.

== See also ==
- List of tallest buildings in Tulsa
- Buildings of Tulsa
