= 110 West 7th Building =

Commercial skyscraper in Tulsa, Oklahoma

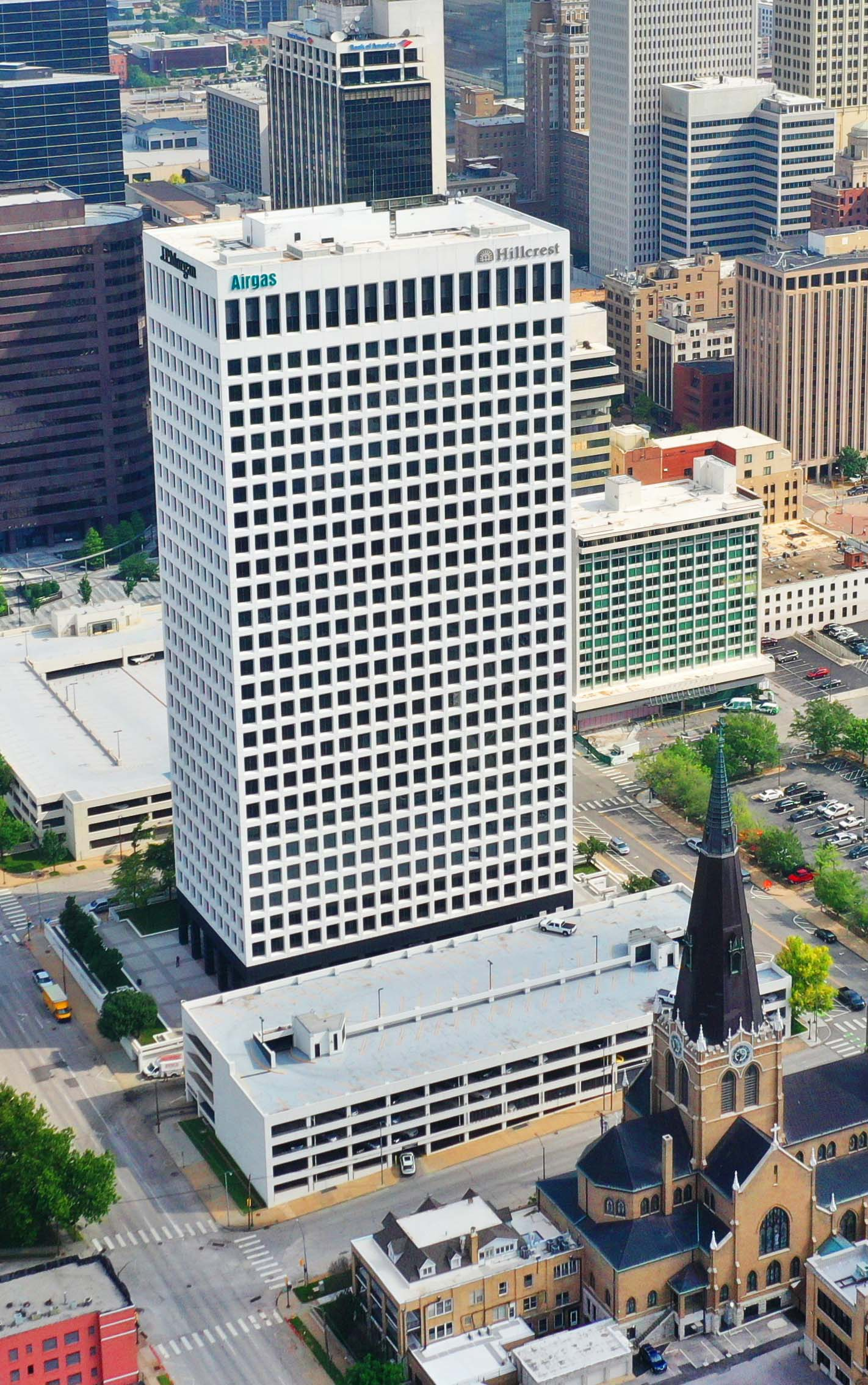
- Interactive map of the 110 West 7th Building area

General information
- Type: Office
- Architectural style: International Style
- Location: 110 West 7th Street, Tulsa, Oklahoma
- Coordinates: 36.148544°N 95.990821°W
- Construction started: 1969
- Completed: 1971
- Opening: 1971

Height
- Roof: 388 ft (118 m)

Technical details
- Floor count: 28
- Floor area: 521,845 sq ft (48,481.0 m^{2})

Design and construction
- Architects: Stevens & Wilkinson (Atlanta) and Black, West & Wozencraft (Tulsa)

The 110 West 7th Building is a commercial skyscraper in Tulsa, Oklahoma. The building rises 388 feet (118 m), making it the 7th-tallest building in the city, and the 14th-tallest building in the U.S. state of Oklahoma. It currently stands as the 3rd-tallest International Style skyscraper in the city, behind the BOK Tower and the Bank of America Center. The building, with its black and white grid exterior floodlighted at night, is a Tulsa landmark.

== History ==
The building was completed in 1971. It was originally constructed to serve as the world headquarters of Cities Service Oil and Gas Corp., when it moved its headquarters from the famous Cities Service Building in New York City. At one point, the building had 2,300 employees, with transferees from New York, Bartlesville, and Philadelphia. During that time, the company was Tulsa's largest private employer.

In 1980, Cities Service commenced a new 52-story headquarters in downtown Tulsa that was intended to become Oklahoma's tallest building. However, as Cities Service and the Citgo brand underwent a series of corporate transformations—first being sold to Occidental Petroleum Corporation, then to Southland Corporation, and ultimately to Petróleos de Venezuela—the company's needs changed. Cities Service eventually moved its headquarters out of downtown Tulsa, first to a tower in south Tulsa, then ultimately leaving Tulsa and moving the headquarters to Houston in 2004. The planned replacement tower was topped off at 17 stories and now serves as headquarters for ONEOK, Inc. Over time, Occidental also reduced its occupancy at 110 West 7th, leaving it underutilized. Subsequent ownership performed upgrades and the building now serves as a general-purpose office tower.

== Architecture ==
The building was constructed in the International Style that matured after World War II. The style is characterized by a square or rectangular footprint, a cubic "extruded rectangle" form, windows running in broken horizontal rows to form a grid, and façade angles set at 90 degrees. The building rises 388 feet (118 m) and comprises 28 floors. It is served by 10 elevators and 1 freight elevator.

== Notable tenants ==
Occidental Petroleum Corporation (Oxy), a California-based oil and gas exploration and production company, has Oklahoma offices in the building. The company is the largest oil producer in Texas and the largest natural gas producer in California.

== See also ==
- List of tallest buildings in Tulsa
- Buildings of Tulsa
