= Boulder Towers =

Coordinates: 36°08′28″N 95°59′16″W

- East Tower & West Tower
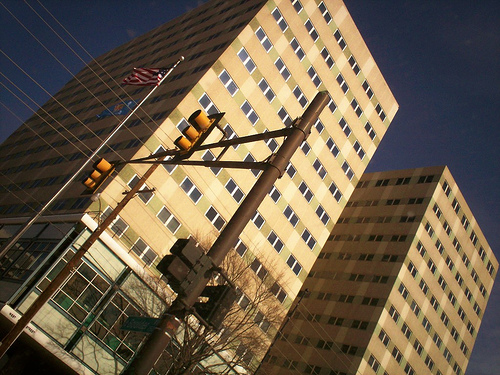
- Boulder Towers in 2007 (after addition of Tower #2)
- Interactive map of the Boulder Towers area

General information
- Type: Office
- Location: 1437 South Boulder Avenue, Tulsa, Oklahoma, United States
- Completed: 1960 (West Tower); 1980 (East Tower)
- Opening: 1960 (West Tower); 1980 (East Tower)

Height
- Roof: 253 ft (77 m)

Technical details
- Floor count: 15

Design and construction
- Architects: Black & West

Boulder Towers is a large commercial building complex in Tulsa, Oklahoma. The complex consists of two twin high-rise buildings, Boulder Towers East Tower and Boulder Towers West Tower, which both rise 253 feet (77 m). Each building contains 15 floors. The complex was originally constructed in 1960, consisting of only the West Tower; the East Tower was constructed in 1980. The Boulder Towers currently stand as the tallest twin towers in Tulsa and the state of Oklahoma. In addition, as of October, 2018, they are tied as the 18th-tallest buildings in Tulsa. The Boulder Towers are the 6th-tallest modern style skyscrapers in the city, behind the Cityplex Tower, the First Place Tower, the University Club Tower, Cityplex West Tower and the Liberty Towers complex.

== History ==
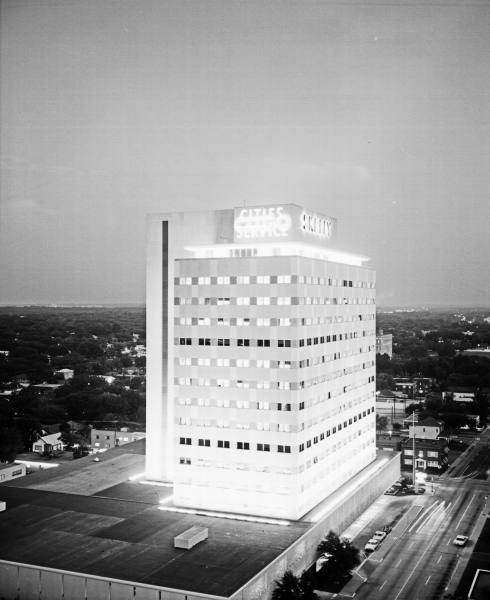
Boulder Tower #1, note Skelly and Cities Service logos on building

The first tower was built in 1959 (and completed in 1960) for Skelly Oil Company, serving as Skelly's corporate headquarters. The company became defunct in 1974 when it was absorbed by Getty Oil Company. The building was then known as the Getty Building, until Texaco acquired Getty Oil in 1984. Getty built the twin second tower in 1980.

In May, 1997, the K/B Fund IV, a Delaware general partnership located in Newport, California bought the Texaco complex for $7.25 million. CB Richard Ellis Inc acquired the property through a merger with the investment fund. The new owner renamed the property Boulder Towers, reflecting its twin architectural design. Ellis then spent 22 months and approximately $3.0 million renovating the complex. According to the Tulsa World, the occupancy rose from 35 percent before the Ellis acquisition to about 75 percent after the renovations.

On December 28, 2007, the complex was acquired by local company La Vida Loca for $31.9 million and immediately sold to a group of 13 buyers at the same price. Among the buyers were Select Ventures and Southcor Developers, with respective ownership shares of 19.29 and 19.25 percent, while ASP was listed as the managing partner, taking 11.57 percent ownership.

== See also ==
- List of tallest buildings in Tulsa
- Buildings of Tulsa
