= Mid-Continent Tower =

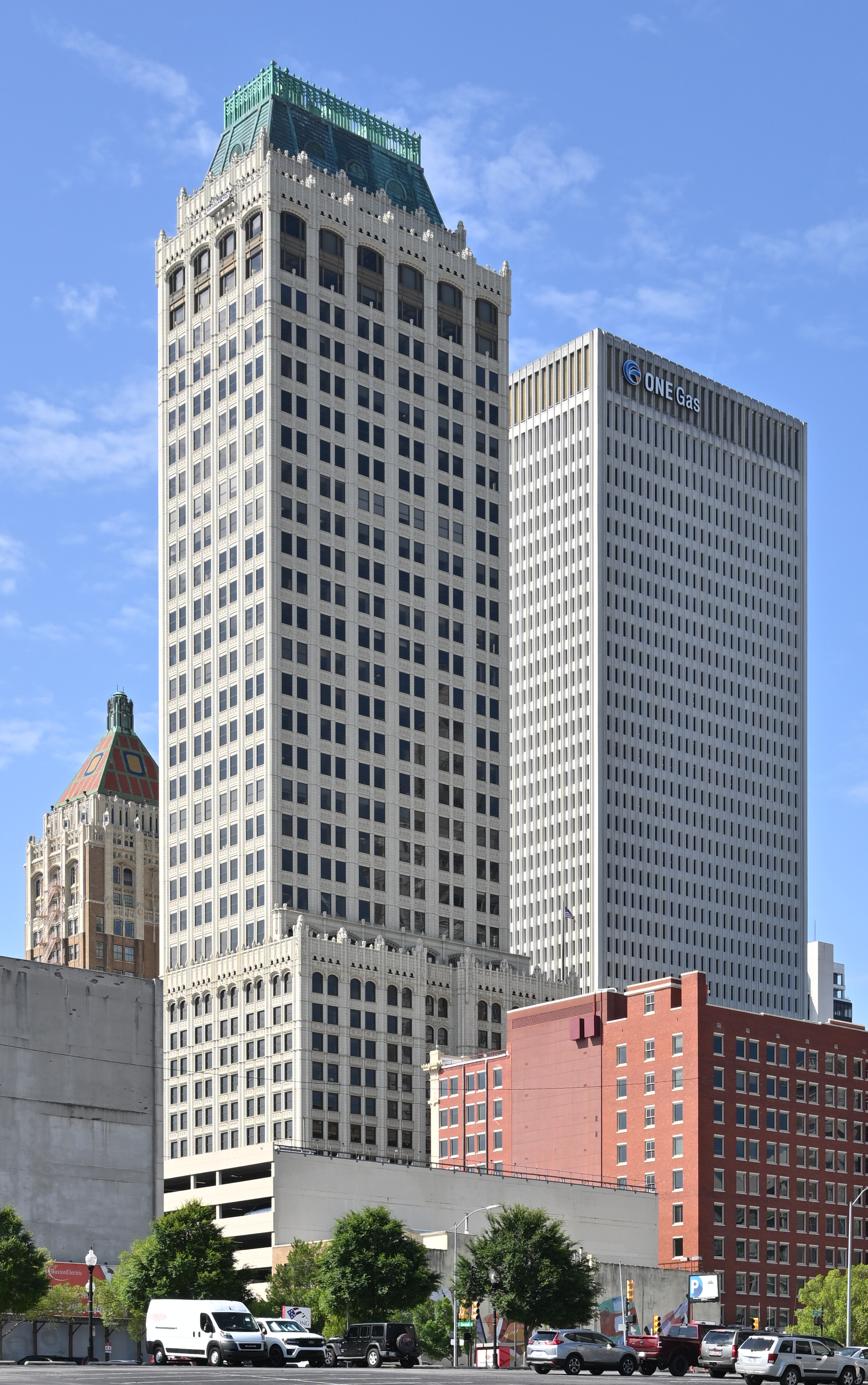
- Mid-Continent Tower (right) in 2005
- Interactive map of the Mid-Continent Tower area

General information
- Type: Office
- Location: 401 South Boston Ave., Tulsa, Oklahoma
- Coordinates: 36.152603°N 95.989006°W
- Completed: 1918 (first 16 stories); 1984 (top 20 floors)

Height
- Height: 513 ft (156 m)

Technical details
- Floor count: 36
- Cosden Building
- U.S. National Register of Historic Places
- Built: 1918
- Architectural style: Neo-Gothic
- NRHP reference No.: 79002029
- Added to NRHP: February 1, 1979

The Mid-Continent Tower is a 36-story skyscraper located at 401 South Boston Avenue in downtown Tulsa, Oklahoma. At 156 meters (513 ft) in height, it is the fourth-tallest building in Tulsa and fifth-tallest in Oklahoma. Faced with bright white terra cotta and crowned with a distinctive copper roof, it is one of the city's most recognizable buildings. The design is unique because the first 16-story structure was built in 1918. The top 20 stories comprise a separate structure, cantilevered over the first 66 years later. The architects of the addition matched the design of the original structure so carefully that the result is considered a single structure. It is included as a contributing structure in Tulsa's Oil Capital Historic District.

== History ==
=== Cosden Building ===
The Mid-Continent Tower started out as the 16-story Cosden Building, built for oil baron Joshua Cosden in 1918. The Cosden Building was built on the site of the first Tulsa schoolhouse, which was established as a mission in 1885 on Creek Indian land. The Cosden Building was listed on the National Register of Historic Places in 1979. It was designed by Kansas City architect Henry F. Hoit who also designed a home for Cosden.

=== Conversion to Mid-Continent Tower ===
The building was restored in 1980, and in 1984 a new 20-story tower was cantilevered over it, bringing the total number of floors to 36. The tower appears to rest on the Cosden Building, but it is actually supported by an addition built onto the east side of the older structure. The entire project was designed to resemble the style of the Cosden Building as closely as possible, giving the impression of a unified whole even though the two sections of the building were constructed 66 years apart. It remains listed on the National Register of Historic Places under the same number that was issued before the conversion.

The building was the home of energy company Reading & Bates until it moved to Houston in 1989. The company's departure led the building into foreclosure in 1994, receivership in 1997 in which Terry Argue was appointed the receiver, and an extended legal dispute that was resolved only in 2011, when the building was sold by Terry Argue receiver to Tulsa real estate investors John and Chris Bumgarner.

Although it is sometimes mentioned in connection with Tulsa's extensive inventory of Art Deco buildings, the Mid-Continent Tower is actually built in a modern version of the Gothic style that was popular before the advent of Art Deco.

Images
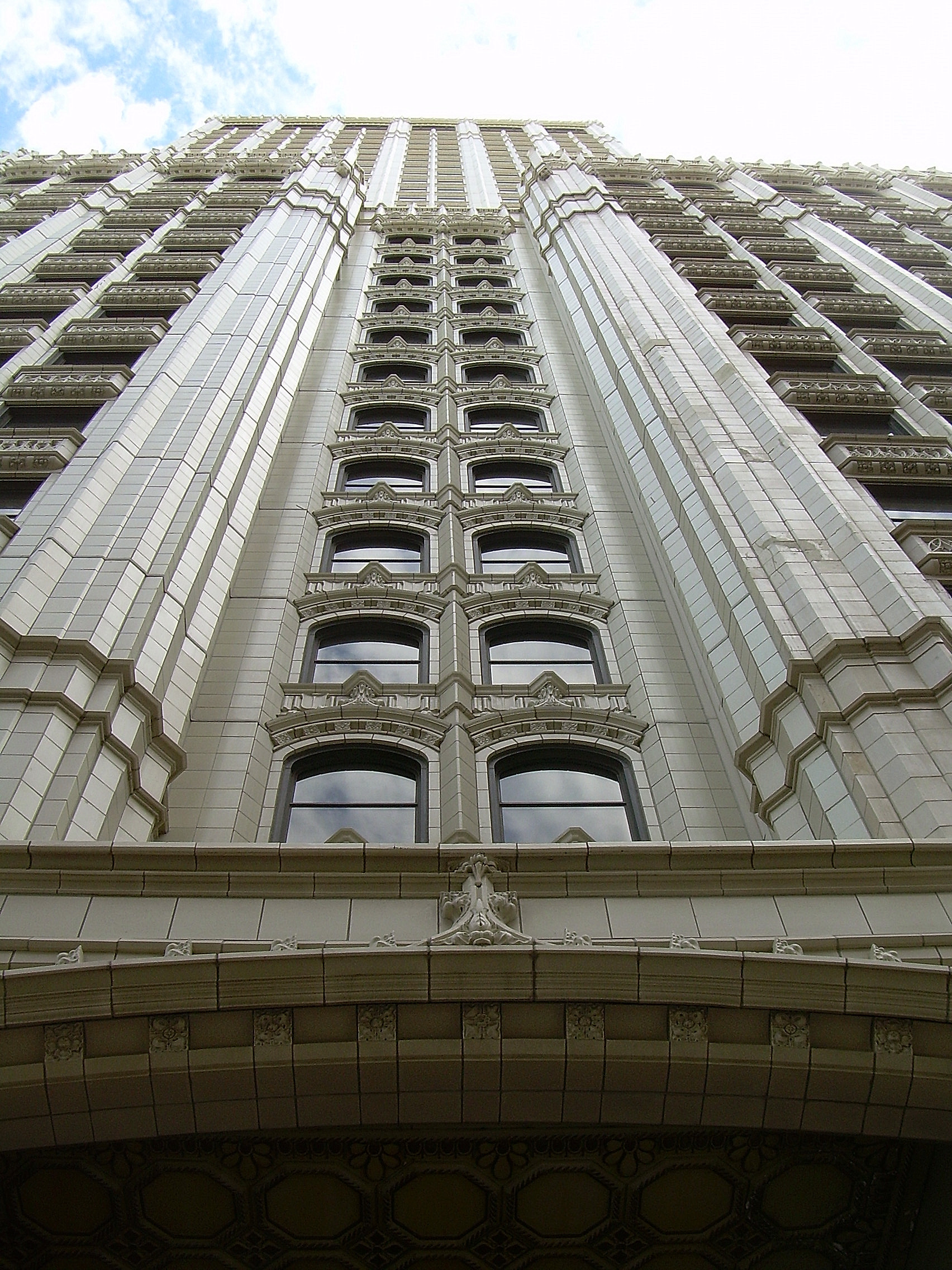
The Mid-Continent Tower in 2006

== See also ==
- List of tallest buildings in Oklahoma
- List of tallest buildings in Tulsa

Preceded by Petroleum Building	Tallest Building in Tulsa; 1918—1925; 56m	Succeeded by Mayo Hotel
