= Liberty Tower (Tulsa) =

- Interactive map of the Liberty Tower area

General information
- Type: Commercial/Residential
- Location: 1502 South Boulder Avenue, Tulsa, Oklahoma, United States
- Coordinates: 36°08′24″N 95°59′19″W
- Completed: 1965
- Opening: 1965

Height
- Roof: 254 ft (77 m)

Technical details
- Floor count: 24

Liberty Tower, officially Liberty Tower Condominiums, is a commercial/residential high-rise building complex in Tulsa, Oklahoma. The building rises 254 feet (77 m). It contains 24 floors, and was completed in 1965. Liberty Tower currently stands as the 11th-tallest building in the city, and the 25th-tallest building in the state of Oklahoma. It also currently stands as the 2nd-tallest commercial-residential building in Tulsa, after the University Club Tower, and the 3rd-tallest in the state. Liberty Tower is the 5th-tallest international style skyscraper in the city, behind the Cityplex Tower, the First Place Tower, the University Club Tower and Cityplex West Tower.

== See also ==
- List of tallest buildings in Tulsa
- Buildings of Tulsa
