= 320 South Boston Building =

Skyscraper located in downtown Tulsa

Coordinates: 36.1530°N 95.9898°W

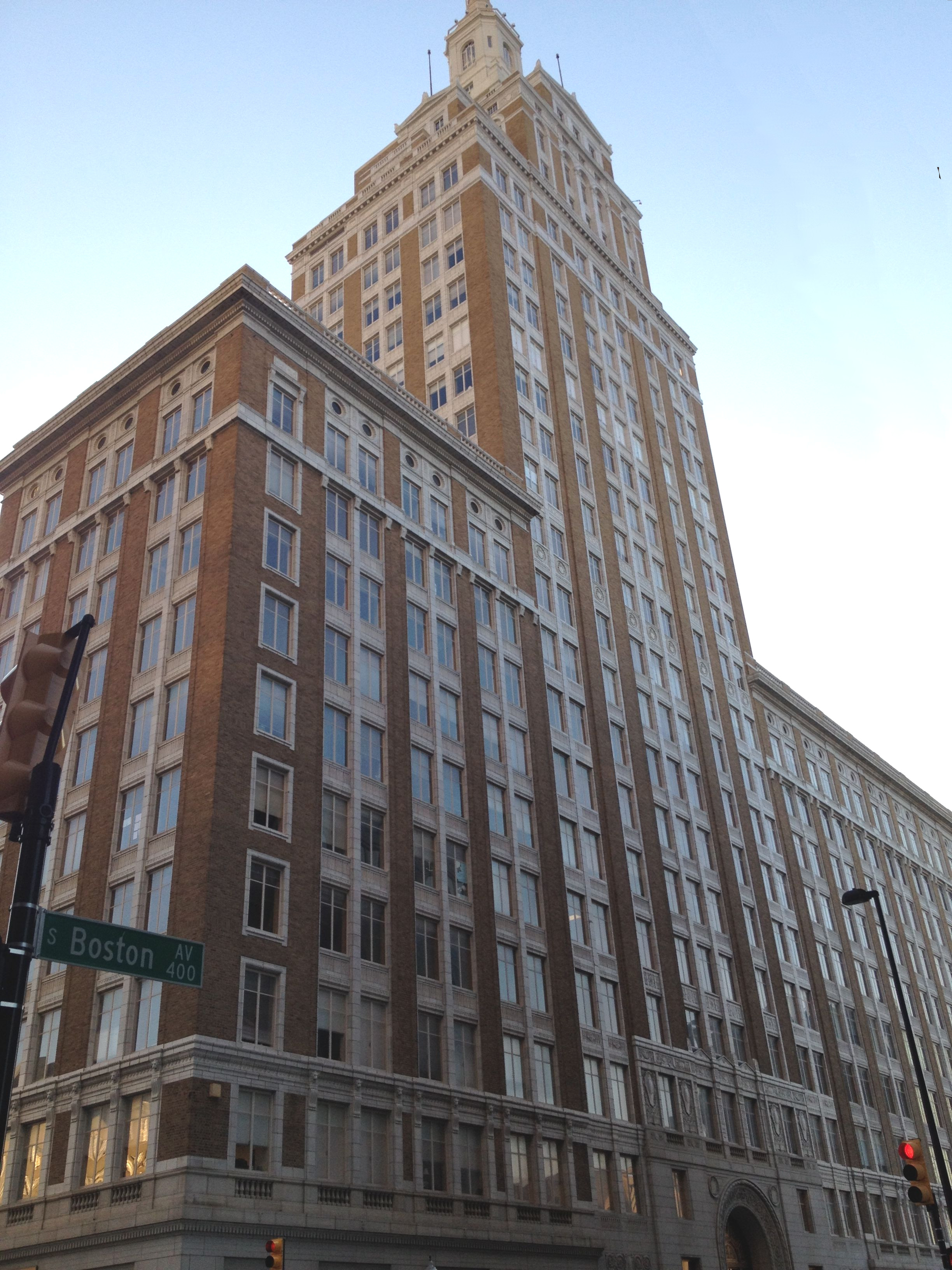
- 320 South Boston Building, Tulsa, OK
- Interactive map of the 320 South Boston Building area
- Former names: Exchange National Bank Building
- Alternative names: National Bank of Tulsa Building

General information
- Status: Completed
- Location: 320 South Boston, Tulsa, Oklahoma, USA
- Construction started: 1916
- Completed: 1928

Height
- Height: 400 ft (120 m)

Technical details
- Floor count: 22
- Floor area: 396,822 sq ft (36,866.0 m^{2})

Design and construction
- Architect: George Winkler

The 320 South Boston Building (formerly known as the National Bank of Tulsa Building) is a 22-story skyscraper located in downtown Tulsa, Oklahoma. It was originally constructed at the corner of Third Street and Boston Avenue as a ten-story headquarters building for the Exchange National Bank of Tulsa, Oklahoma in 1917, and expanded to its present dimensions in 1929. The addition brought the building's height to 400 feet (122 m), making it the tallest building in Oklahoma. It lost this distinction in 1931, but remained the tallest building in Tulsa until Fourth National Bank (today Bank of America Center) was completed in 1967. It is now included in the Oil Capital Historic District.

== Description and history ==
The building sits on the west side of Boston Avenue and extends a full city block between Third and Fourth Streets. The Beaux Arts-style building was designed by Oscar Wenderoth of the Chicago architectural firm of the Weary & Alford Company. It is covered in brick with terra cotta trim. The lower two stories are covered in terra cotta. The central tower is stepped at the 20th floor, with a two-story arcade section, which is topped by a temple fronted section. A cupola tops the section. For many years, the cupola was illuminated by floodlights whose color changed according to the latest weather forecast. Green light meant a fair weather forecast, while red lights signified an approaching storm. (Note: A postcard published before 1967 showed that green light meant fair, flashing green indicated that rain was approaching, red indicated that a sudden temperature change was coming, and flashing red signified a severe storm alert.)

In 1933, Exchange National Bank reorganized and renamed itself as the National Bank of Tulsa. Thereafter, the building was known as the National Bank of Tulsa Building (or NBT Building), until the bank renamed itself as Bank of Oklahoma (BOK). The BOK moved to its newly constructed BOK Tower in 1977. The NBT Building reverted to its former 320 South Boston Building name and became a general office building. Among the tenants are Hall Estill, one of Oklahoma's largest law firms.

In 1949, Tulsa television station KOTV erected its first transmitter atop the building. During construction, a worker's wrench fell and struck a woman on the street below, killing her. KOTV continued to broadcast from the building until a taller tower was constructed in 1954.

A longstanding urban myth regarding the pinnacle of 320 South Boston Building erroneously reported that the tower was designed as a Zeppelin mooring. The myth, often propagated by local media, stated that the pinnacle was used at least once when a U.S. Navy Zeppelin moored there in the 1930s.

The top of the building was illuminated for weather alerts, with flashing red lights in the event of an approaching storm.

The architect was George Winkler, who also designed the Mayo Hotel.

== See also ==
- List of tallest buildings in Tulsa

== Notes ==
Preceded by Philtower Building	Tallest Building in Tulsa; 1928—1967; 122m	Succeeded by Bank of America Center
