= Arvest Tower =

Commercial high-rise building located in Tulsa, Oklahoma

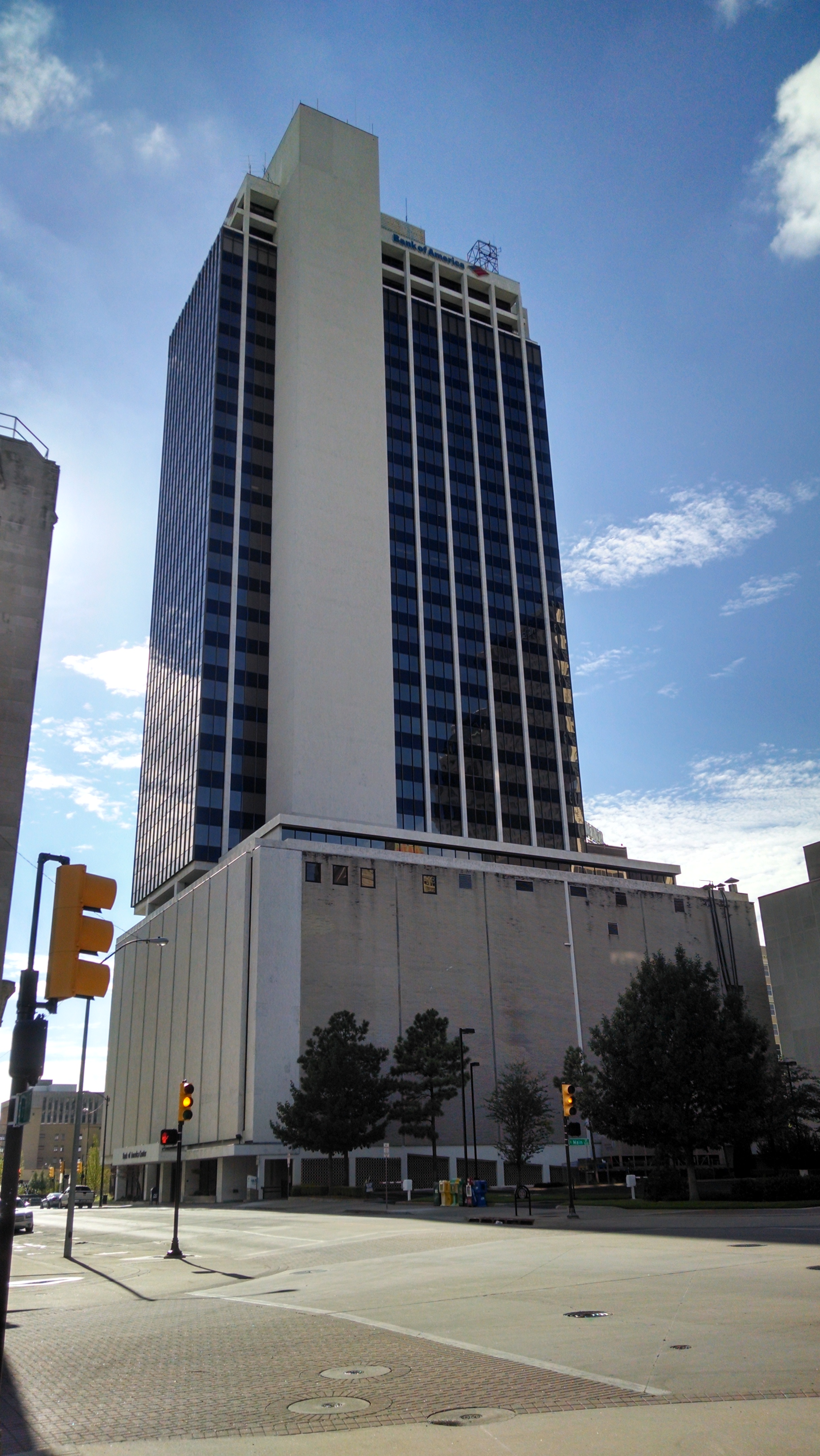
- Interactive map of the Arvest Tower area

General information
- Type: Office
- Location: 15 West 6th Street, Tulsa, Oklahoma, United States
- Coordinates: 36°9′1″N 95°59′26″W
- Construction started: 1966
- Completed: 1967
- Opening: 1967
- Owner: Bank of America

Height
- Roof: 412 ft (126 m)

Technical details
- Floor count: 32
- Floor area: 288,774 sq ft (26,828.0 m^{2})

Design and construction
- Architects: Kelley and Marshall

The Arvest Tower (formerly the Bank of America Center) is a commercial skyscraper in Tulsa, Oklahoma. The building rises 412 feet (126 m) in downtown Tulsa. and contains 288,776 square feet (26,828.2 m^{2}) of space. It has 32 floors, and was completed in 1967 as the Fourth National Bank of Tulsa. It is located on the corner of Sixth Street and Boulder Avenue, the site of the former Tulsa County court house. The Arvest Tower currently stands as the 5th-tallest building in the city, and the 9th-tallest building in the state of Oklahoma. The architectural firm who designed the building was Kelley & Marshall of Tulsa. The Arvest Tower contains offices of the Charlotte-based Bank of America Corporation. It currently stands as the 2nd-tallest international style skyscraper in the city, behind the BOK Tower. It also houses the offices of several petroleum companies and the Oklahoma State Attorney General's office. In 2024, Arvest Bank bought the naming rights and rebranded the tower in February 2025.

== See also ==
- List of tallest buildings in Tulsa
- List of tallest buildings in Oklahoma
- Buildings of Tulsa

Preceded by 320 South Boston Building	Tallest Building in Tulsa; 1967—1974; 126m	Succeeded by First Place Tower
