= Philtower Building =

- Philtower
- U.S. National Register of Historic Places
- U.S. Historic district – Contributing property
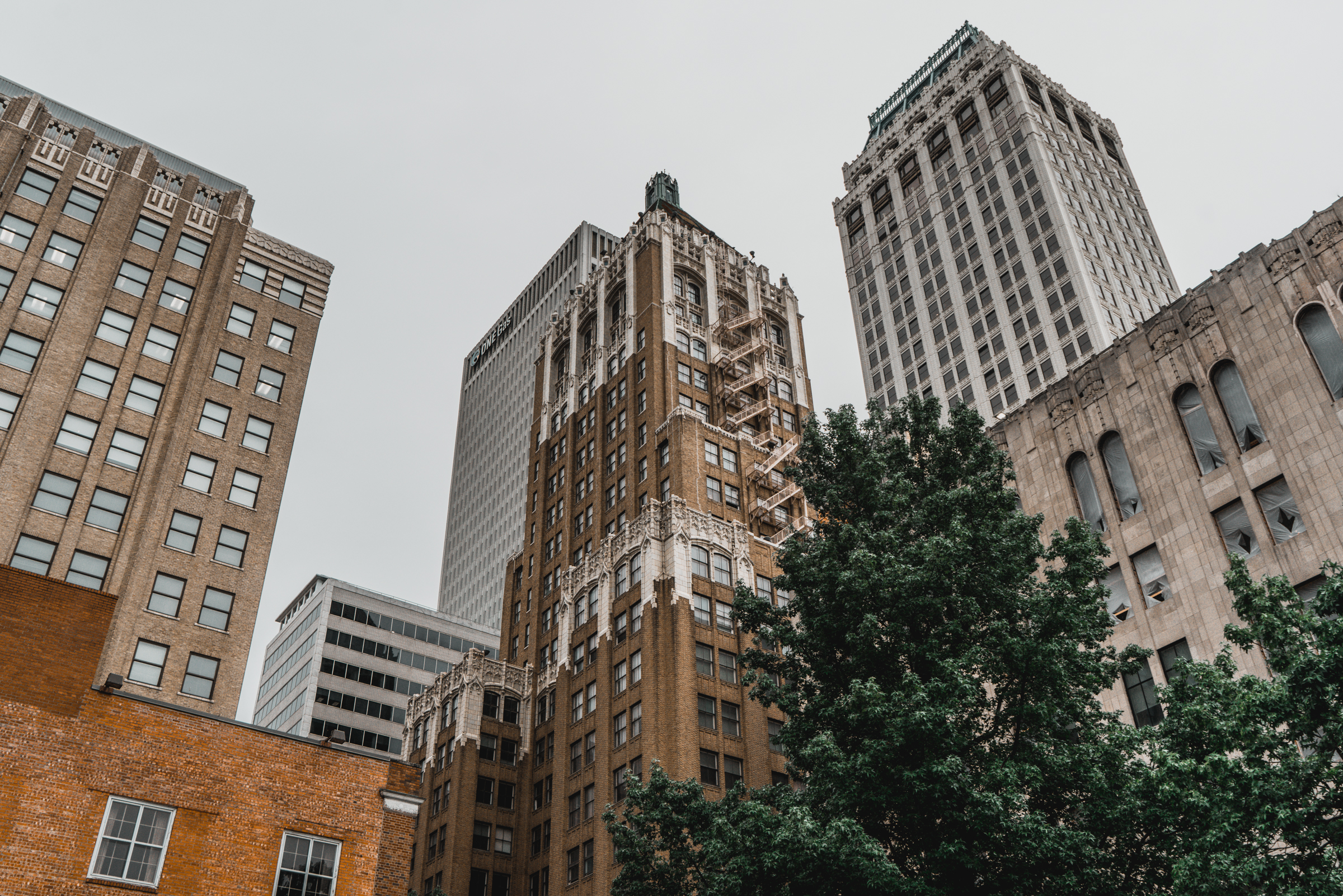
- The Philtower (center) set against several other downtown Tulsa buildings

- Location within Oklahoma Location within the United States
- Location: 427 S. Boston Ave., Tulsa, Oklahoma
- Coordinates: 36°9′7″N 95°59′19″W
- Area: less than one acre
- Built: 1928
- Architect: Keene & Simpson; Delk, Edward Buehler
- NRHP reference No.: 79002032
- Added to NRHP: August 29, 1979

The Philtower Building is a historic building located at 427 South Boston Avenue in Tulsa, Oklahoma.

== Description and history ==
Completed in 1928, it was designed by Edward Buehler Delk and financed by renowned oilman and dedicated philanthropist Waite Phillips (1883–1964). Associated architects Keene & Simpson performed architectural supervision in the construction of the building. In 1941, Phillips deeded the Philtower Building to the Boy Scouts of America (BSA), along with most of his Philmont Ranch and Villa Philmonte. The income from the building was used to help support Philmont. In 1977, the BSA sold the Building to a group of local investors. This group, The Philtower LLC, is the current owner. It is an example of neo-Gothic and art deco architecture.

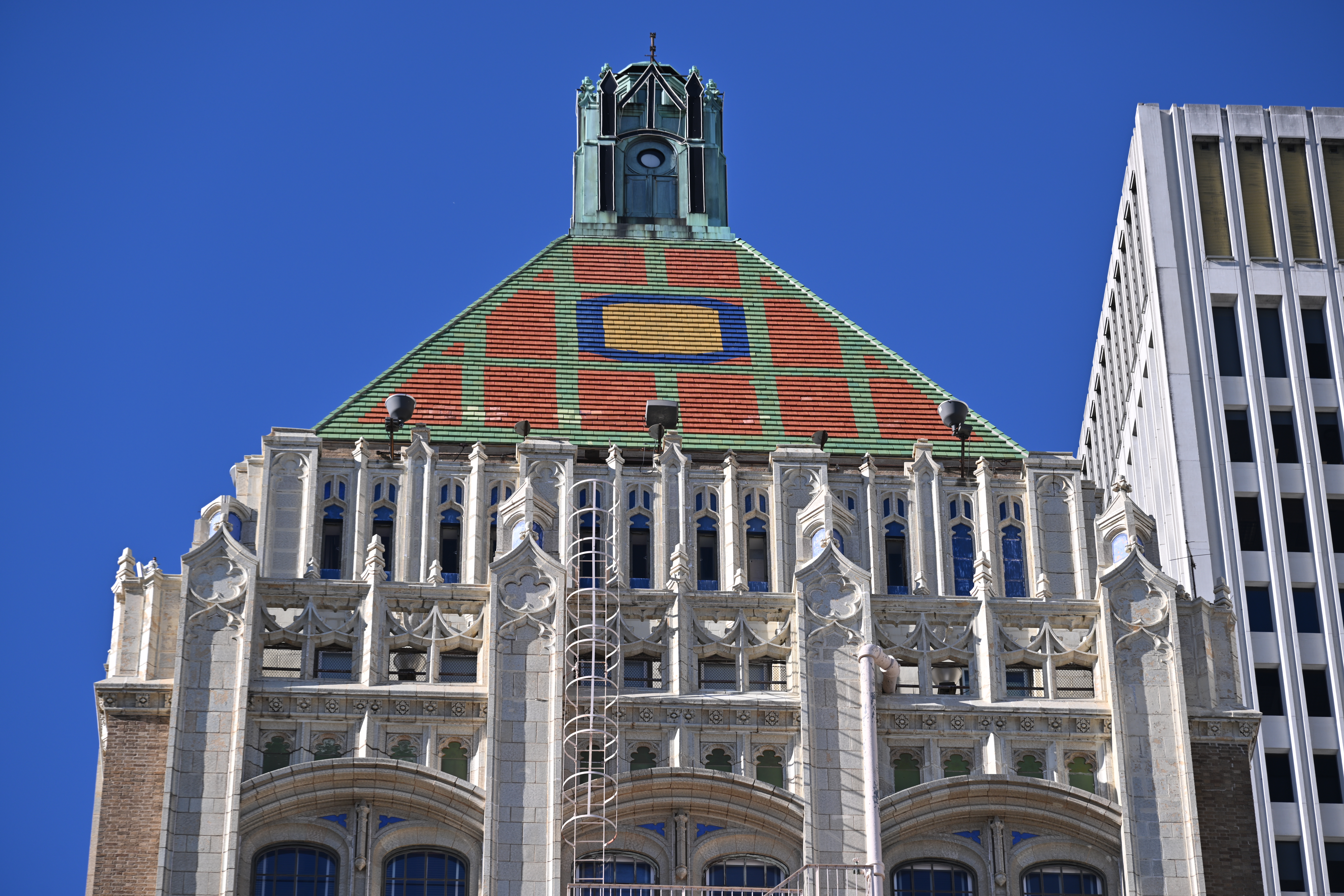
Philtower tile roof and upper floors, Tulsa, OK

According to the Tulsa Preservation Commission, the building represents the Gothic Revival architecture style. A notable feature is the illuminated, sloping tiled roof. The office on the 21st floor that was used by Waite Phillips has been preserved.

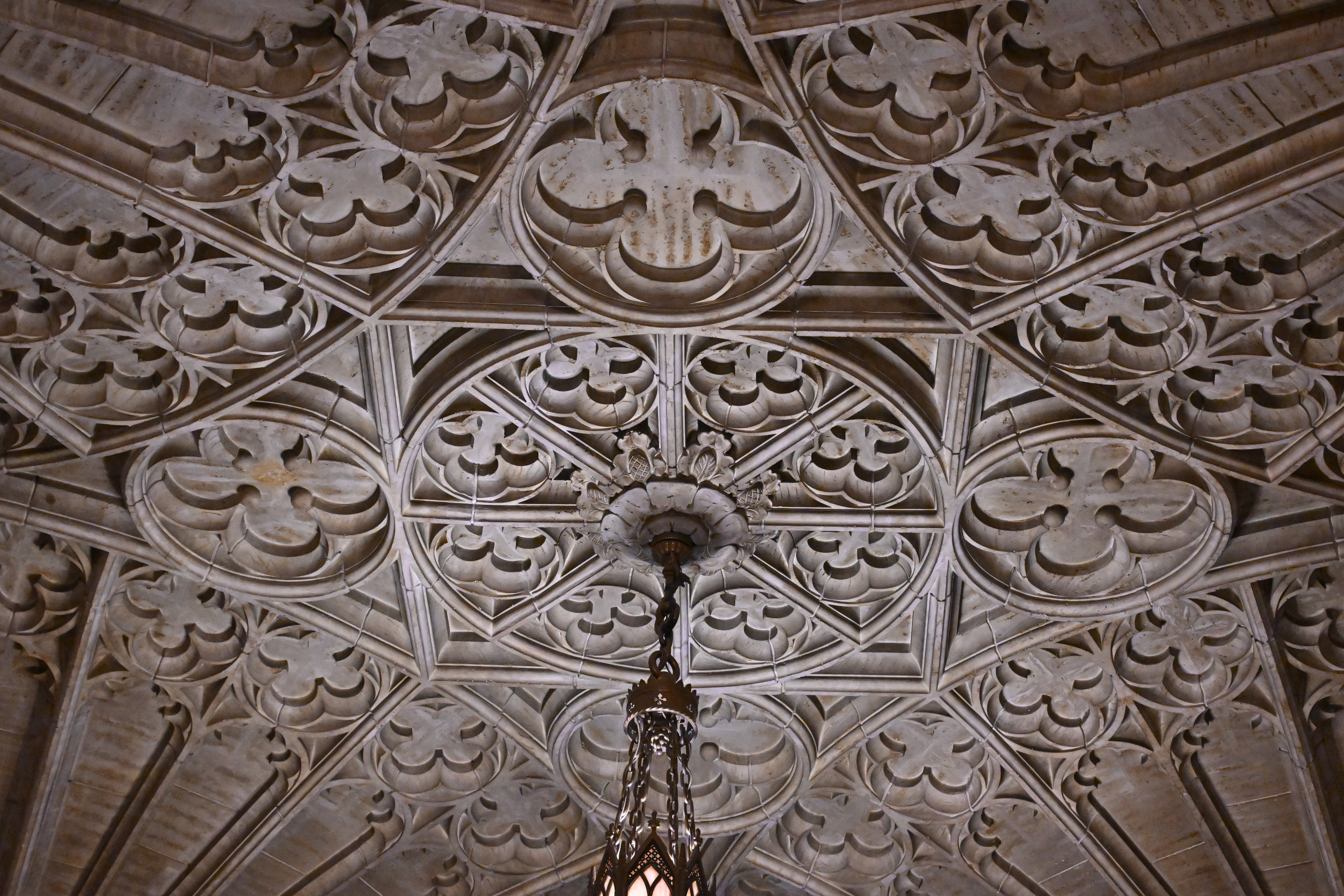
the stone-relief rosette ceiling in the lobby of the Philtower building

The vaulted lobby ceiling is composed of large carved stone rosettes that were created in Italy and reassembled in the building by the same craftsmen that made them.

Originally built as a high-rise office building, floors 12–20 were converted to loft apartments in 2004, making the Philtower Tulsa's first mixed use high-rise. The building has 24 floors and is 323 feet tall.

It was listed on the National Register of Historic Places in 1979. It was included in the Oil Capital Historic District on December 13, 2010.

== See also ==
- List of tallest buildings in Tulsa

Preceded by Mayo Hotel	Tallest Building in Tulsa; 1927—1928; 105m	Succeeded by 320 South Boston Building
