= 2017 Tulsa tornadoes =

Weather event in Oklahoma, United States

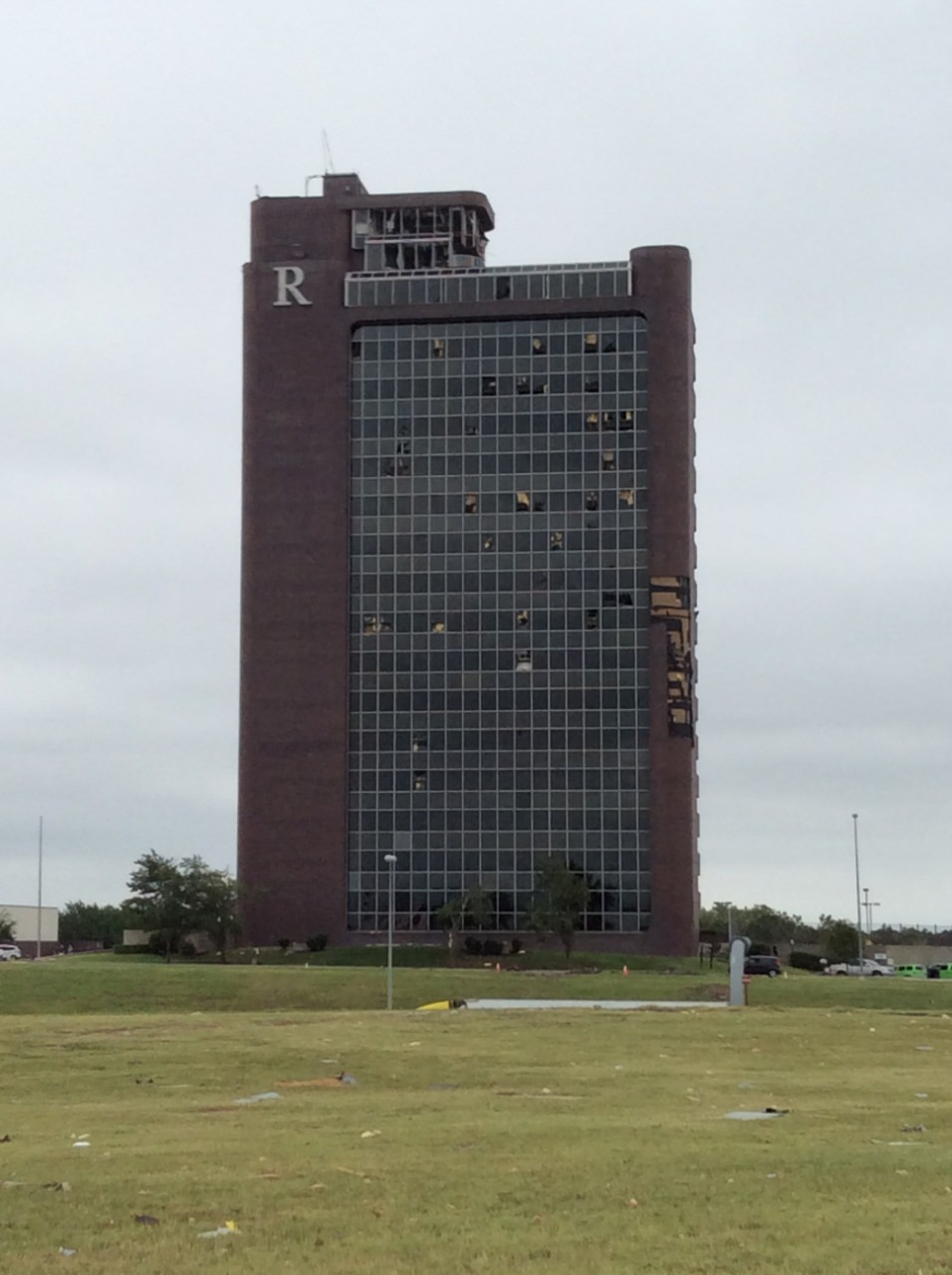
- Remington Tower in Tulsa heavily damaged by August 6, 2017 tornado

Meteorological history
- Duration: August 6, 2017

Tornado outbreak
- Tornadoes: 4
- Max. rating: EF2 tornado
- Duration: 54 minutes
- Highest winds: 120–130 mph (190–210 km/h) (estimated by damage survey)

Extratropical cyclone

Overall effects
- Injuries: 30
- Damage: $50.240 million (2015 USD)
- Areas affected: Northeastern Oklahoma
- Part of the Tornadoes of 2017

In the early-morning hours of August 6, 2017, an unexpected damaging wind and tornado event impacted the Tulsa, Oklahoma metropolitan area as a result of a line of storms that abruptly intensified into an intense bow echo with embedded low-level rotations. The line spawned four tornadoes with the first one being a strong EF2 tornado that inflicted major damage to a shopping and office area in southeastern Tulsa, injuring 30 people. The other three tornadoes produced the storms were rated EF1. The event was also noteworthy due to the tornadoes forming so fast that all but one of them did not receive sufficient and timely warnings, with the EF2 tornado not being warned until after it dissipated. Severe wind damage was also confirmed throughout the area.

== Meteorological synopsis ==
The day of severe weather was first mentioned by the Storm Prediction Center on July 30 for the Day 7 outlook. At the time, it was given a "PREDICTABILITY TOO LOW" designation. It was downgraded to "POTENTIAL TOO LOW" for Day 5 on August 1, but was reupgraded to "PREDICTABILITY TOO LOW." Severe storms were anticipated across a broad region of the Central Plains as well as New England with a large marginal risk issued for both areas in the Day 3 outlook on August 3, but the highest threat zone was deemed to be mainly in southern Kansas and northwestern Oklahoma, where a slight risk was delineated on the second Day 2 outlook on August 4. Northeastern Oklahoma was left in a marginal risk for all of August 5 with the only anticipated severe risk being isolated large hail and damaging winds; tornadoes were not expected. However, a severe thunderstorm watch was issued for the region as well as southeast Kansas at 7:05 pm CDT with the expiration time being 2 am CDT on August 6.

The storms that formed in Kansas on the afternoon of August 5 moved east-southeastward into Oklahoma and weakened during the overnight hours. Continued weakening was expected with the only exception being the possibility of an isolated damaging wind gust threat that would linger across northeastern Oklahoma due to stronger mid-level westerlies and a weak MCV. This scenario did end up playing out as the storms intensified as they approached the Tulsa metropolitan area, but the line unexpectedly then bowed out, leading to a much more widespread wind damage event than anticipated. Additionally, very strong low-level wind shear aided in the development of quick spin-up rotations along the line and four tornadoes were spawned with the first one being the EF2 tornado that struck the southeastern part of Tulsa. The National Weather Service in Tulsa recognized the growing wind damage threat and issued a large severe thunderstorm warning that encompassed most of the Tulsa metropolitan area as the storms entered the area. However, the EF2 tornado spun-up so fast that did not have a chance to issue a tornado warning until it was already dissipating, although the storm did produce another tornado shortly thereafter. That EF1 tornado was the only one to get a timely warning. The EF1 tornado in Rogers County also did not receive an adequate warning as a tornado warning was not issued until it already been on the ground for five minutes. The rotation that produced the final EF1 tornado that crossed from Rogers County into Mayes County did receive a tornado warning, but it was canceled prematurely after it was deemed the storm had weakened below severe limits. The tornado would touch down eight minutes after the warning was canceled. After moving away from Tulsa, the storms weakened again and remained sub-severe as they continued east-southeastward for the rest of the night.

== Confirmed tornadoes ==
Confirmed tornadoes by Enhanced Fujita rating
EFU	EF0	EF1	EF2	EF3	EF4	EF5	Total
0	0	3	1	0	0	0	4

=== August 6 event ===
List of confirmed tornadoes – Sunday, August 6, 2017 (Note: All dates are based on the local time zone where the tornado touched down; however, all times are in Coordinated Universal Time for consistency.)
EF#	Location	County / Parish	State	Start Coord.	Time (UTC)	Path length	Max width
EF2	Southeastern Tulsa to N of Broken Arrow	Tulsa	OK	36.1097°N 95.9367°W	06:19–06:25	6.9 mi (11.1 km)	550 yd (500 m)
EF2	See section on this tornado – 30 people were injured and losses totaled $50 million.						
EF1	N of Broken Arrow	Tulsa, Wagoner	OK	36.0919°N 95.7936°W	06:27–06:31	2.9 mi (4.7 km)	400 yd (370 m)
EF1	Numerous homes sustained roof damage, and numerous large trees were snapped or uprooted. The roof of an outbuilding was blown off.						
EF1	E of Oologah	Rogers	OK	36.4443°N 95.6908°W	06:32–06:40	4.5 mi (7.2 km)	200 yd (180 m)
EF1	Barns, trees, and a home were damaged. Power poles were snapped.						
EF1	S of Chelsea	Rogers, Mayes	OK	36.4496°N 95.4409°W	07:11–07:13	0.9 mi (1.4 km)	400 yd (370 m)
EF1	An agricultural building sustained minor roof damage.						

=== Tulsa, Oklahoma ===
Tulsa, Oklahoma
Meteorological history
- Formed: August 6, 2017, 1:19 a.m. CDT (UTC−05:00)
- Dissipated: August 6, 2017, 1:25 a.m. CDT (UTC−05:00)
- Duration: 6 minutes

EF2 tornado
- on the Enhanced Fujita scale
- Highest winds: 120–130 mph (190–210 km/h) (estimated by damage survey)

Overall effects
- Fatalities: 0
- Injuries: 30
- Damage: $50 million (2017 USD)
- Areas affected: Tulsa County, Oklahoma

This strong tornado formed at 1:19 am CDT (06:19 UTC) south of East 36th Street South and east of South Harvard Avenue in southeastern part of Tulsa. After initially causing minor EF0 tree damage, the tornado steadily strengthened as it moved east-southeastward, snapping trees and tree limbs and damaging homes at EF1 strength. It then crossed South Yale Avenue into the Southroads Shopping Center, snapping trees and power poles and damaging the exterior of a nine-story Charles Schwab building. The tornado then reached EF2 intensity as it approached I-44. It first struck a T.G.I. Friday's along of E 41st St S, where more than seven people had to be rescued after part ov the roof collapsed into the building, which also had a wall blown out. An AT&T store had much of its roof removed, a Panera Bread suffered severe exterior wall damage, and an Aspen Dental had part of a large thick outer wall torn off. After crossing the E 41st St S and E Skelly Dr, the tornado tore part of the roofs of off a Whataburger and a Chipotle with a vehicle being rolled in the former restaurant's parking lot of and inflicted major facade and window damage to the 18-story Remington Tower office building. Many offices in the building were further damaged by having equipment and furnishings inside sucked through the windows and falling to the ground below. The tornado also caused roof and structural damage to Promenade Mall and impacted infrastructure at the BOK Financial Corporation operations center (near 41st and Sheridan), rendering its online, mobile and automated telephone systems inoperable. The tornado total damage path ended up being 6.9-mile-long (11.1 km) as it dissipated north-northwest of Broken Arrow, Oklahoma at 1:25 am CDT.

This was the first tornado to hit the Tulsa area in the month of August since 1958 (and only the third to strike the area since 1950). It injured 30 people – with two seriously injured – in the east part of the city. Even with the tornado detectable on radar, the Tulsa County Emergency Management Agency did not begin civil defense sirens in the area because the National Weather Service did not issue a tornado warning until 1:25 a.m., by which time the tornado had already dissipated. An EF1 tornado in the same general vicinity formed shortly thereafter.

== See also ==
- List of North American tornadoes and tornado outbreaks
