= First Place Tower =

Skyscraper in Tulsa, Oklahoma

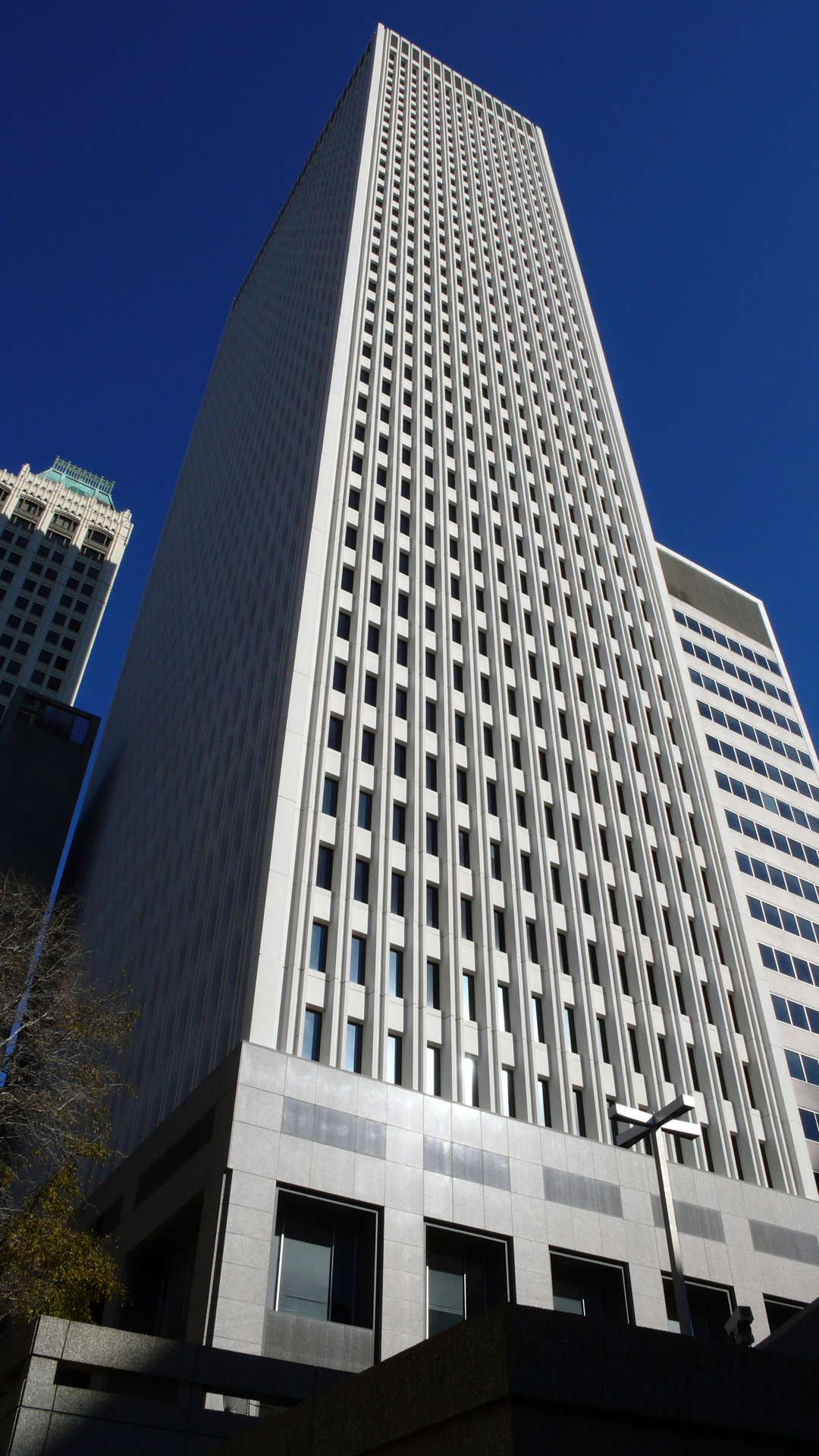
- Interactive map of First Place Tower

General information
- Type: Office
- Location: 15 E 5th St., Tulsa, Oklahoma
- Coordinates: 36.1521007°N 95.9895873°W
- Completed: 1973

Height
- Roof: 516 ft (157 m)

Technical details
- Floor count: 41
- Floor area: 621,325 ft^{2} (57,723.0 m^{2})

First Place Tower is a skyscraper located at 15 East Fifth in downtown Tulsa, Oklahoma. The Tower side completed in 1973 and has 41 stories. The midrise section of the building was built in 1949 and is 20 stories tall. At 516 feet (157 m) in height, it is the third tallest building in Tulsa behind BOK Tower and Cityplex Towers, and the fourth tallest in Oklahoma. Although it shares an address with the adjacent First National Bank Building, it faces Boston Avenue.

From 2006 to 2017 it was owned by Maurice Kanbar, a California entrepreneur who had extensive holdings in downtown Tulsa until he sold a portfolio of his holdings, including this building, in 2017 to his operating partner, Stuart Price.

== See also ==
- Buildings of Tulsa, Oklahoma
- List of tallest buildings in Tulsa
- List of tallest buildings in Oklahoma

Preceded by Bank of America Center	Tallest Building in Tulsa; 1974—1975; 157m	Succeeded by BOK Tower
