= List of Art Deco buildings in Tulsa, Oklahoma =

This is a list of Art Deco buildings and structures in Tulsa, Oklahoma, United States.

== Zigzag Style ==
Zigzag Style
Image	Building	Date	Architect	Notes
	Eleventh Street Bridge; October 1, 2020	1916-17, Modified 1929	Missouri Valley Bridge & Iron Co., Harrington, Howard & Ash	U.S. Highway 66 over the Arkansas River; Listed on National Register of Historic Places
	Southwestern Bell Main Dial Building, 424 South Detroit Avenue	1924, Modified 1930	I. M. Timlin	Listed on National Register of Historic Places
	Day Building (Nelson's Buffeteria), 512 South Boston Avenue	1926	Bruce Goff	
	Fawcett Building (Stanolind/Amoco), 515 South Boston Avenue	1926	Leon B. Senter	
	Tulsa Club Building, 115 East 5th Street	1927	Rush, Endacott and Rush, Bruce Goff	
	Medical and Dental Arts Building, 108 West 6th Street	1927	Arthur M. Atkinson, Joseph R Koberling	Demolished
	Page Warehouse, 2036 East 11th Street	1927	Rush, Endacott and Rush, Bruce Goff	
	Adah Robinson Residence, 1119 South Owasso Avenue	1927–1929	Bruce Goff	
	Oklahoma Natural Gas Company Building, 624 South Boston Avenue	1928	Arthur M. Atkinson, Frederick V. Kershner	Listed on National Register of Historic Places
	Christ the King Church, 1530 South Rockford Avenue	1928	Byrne & Byrne, Francis Barry Byrne	
	Guaranty Laundry, 2036 East 11th Street	1928	Bruce Goff	
	Skelly Building Addition, 23 West 4th Street	1928	Bruce Goff	Demolished
	Bliss Hotel, 123 South Boston Avenue	1929	L. I. Shumway	Demolished 1973
	Boston Avenue Methodist Church, 1301 South Boston Avenue	1929	Disputed, Adah Robinson and Bruce Goff credited	National Historic Landmark
	Public Service of Oklahoma, 600 South Main Street	1929	Joseph R. Koberling	Listed on National Register of Historic Places
	Riverside Studio, 1381 Riverside Drive	1929	Bruce Goff	Listed on National Register of Historic Places
	Westhope, 3704 South Birmingham Avenue	1929	Frank Lloyd Wright	Listed on National Register of Historic Places
	Midwest Equitable Meter, 3130 Charles Page Boulevard	1929		
	Halliburton-Abbott Clothing Company Building (Sears/Skaggs), 500 South Boulder Avenue	1929	Frank C. Walter	Demolished and replaced by OneOK Building.
	Genet Building (American Airline Building)	1930	Noble, Fleming, Joseph R. Koberling	Demolished, 1969
	Warehouse Market, 925 South Elgin Avenue	1930	B. Gaylord Noftsger	
	Gillette-Tyrell Building, 423 South Boulder Avenue	1930	Edward W. Saunders	Listed on National Register of Historic Places
	Milady's Cleaners, 1736-38 East 11th Street	1930		
	Merchant's Exhibit Building, Tulsa State Fairgrounds	1930	Bruce Goff	Demolished (collapsed into abandoned coal mine)
	National Supply Company (U-Haul), 504 East Archer street	1930		
	Fire Station #13, 3924 Charles Page Boulevard	1931	Albert Joseph Love	
	Philcade Building, 511 South Boston Avenue	1931	Leon B. Senter	Listed on National Register of Historic Places
	Marquette School, 1519 South Quincy Avenue	1932		
	Tulsa Municipal Airport Administration Building, 6600 East Apache Avenue	1932		Demolished
	State Theater (400 seats), 118 South Main Street	1935 Zigzag remodel of 1907 Wonderland Theater	Joseph R. Koberling	Demolished, 1973
	Shakespeare Monument, Woodward Park		Adah Robinson, Eugene Shonnard	
	Westinghouse Warehouse (Bedcheck)			(Living Arts in 2009)

== PWA Style ==
PWA Style
Image	Building	Date	Architect	Notes
	Eleventh Street Arkansas River Bridge, U.S. Highway 66 over the Arkansas River	1916-17, Modified 1929		Listed on National Register of Historic Places
Oaklawn Cemetery right gate, Tulsa, OK	Oaklawn Cemetery Entrance Gates, 11th and Peoria	c. 1930		
	Tulsa Union Depot, 3 South Boston Avenue	1931		New Home of the Oklahoma Jazz Hall Of Fame, circa 2007. Often referred to as "Jazz Depot".
	Animal Detention Center (Tulsa SPCA), 2910 Mohawk Boulevard	1931		
Pavilion_at_Expo_Square	Fairgrounds Pavilion, Tulsa State Fairgrounds, now known as Expo Square Pavilion	1932	Leland I. Shumway	
	Tulsa Fire Alarm Building, 1010 East 8th Street	1934	Frederick V. Kershner	Listed on National Register of Historic Places Current home to American Cancer Society
	Union Bus Depot, 319 South Cincinnati Avenue	1935		Demolished
	Daniel Webster High School, 1919 West 40th Street	1938	Arthur M. Atkinson, John Duncan Forsyth, Raymond Kerr, and William H. Wolaver.	
	Will Rogers High School, 3909 East 5th Place	1938	Joseph R. Koberling	
	Oklahoma Department of Transportation (Empire Roofing), 1709 East King Place	1940		
	National Guard Armory, 3902 East 15th Street	1942		
	Hawks Ice Cream Co., 2415 E. 11th Street	1948		
	Service Pipeline Building (ARCO Building), 520 S. Cincinnati	1949	Leon B. Senter and Associates	

== Streamline Style ==
Streamline Style
Image	Building	Date	Architect	Notes
	Holland Hall School Building (Boulder on the Park )	1923, remodeled 1947		Listed on National Register of Historic Places
	Uptown Theater (800 seats), 18 South Main Street	1928		Demolished, 1975
	Tower Theater (800 seats), 1105 South Denver Avenue	1930	W. Scott Dunne	Demolished, 1977
	Mid Continent Oil Co. Station, 2102 South Utica	1931		Demolished
	Marathon Oil Co. Station, 201 North Boston Avenue	1931		Demolished
	Lerner Shop, 419 South Main Street	remodeled ca. 1931		
	KVOO Transmitter Station, 15050 East 11th Street	1932		Demolished
	Cities Service Oil Co. Station, 1502 East 11th Street	1932		
	William D. Whenthoff Residence, 1142 South College Avenue	1933	Joseph R. Koberling	
	T. N. Law Residence, 1841 East 27th Street	1935		Demolished
	G. C. Pride Residence, 2103 E. 3rd St.	Remodeled 1935	Joseph R. Koberling	Demolished
	Texas Oil Co. Service Station, 2501 Southwest Boulevard	1936		Demolished
	Jesse D. Davis Residence, 3231 South Utica Avenue	1936		
	J. B. McGay Residence, 1551 South Yorktown Place	1936	Joseph R. Koberling	
	Tulsa Monument Company, 1735 East 11th Street	1936	Harry H. Mahler	
	Silver Castle Restaurants, 15th & Peoria, Admiral & Lewis, 6th & Main, 113 E. 10th, 11th & Indianapolis, 3rd & Denver, 5600 E. 11th, 2341 S. Quannah, 3240 E. Admiral Pl.	1936-40	Ora Overholzer	Art Deco Streamline Demolished
	Burtner N. Fleeger Residence, 2827 South Birmingham Place	1937		
	John Duncan Forsyth Residence, 2424 East 29th Street	1937		
	Security Federal (Court of Three Sisters), 120 West 4th Street	remodeled 1937	Harry H. Mahler	Demolished
	Whitlock's Grocery, 2623 East 11th Street	1937		Demolished
	John Leroy Shakley Residence, 7219 South Evanston Avenue	1937		Demolished
	Howard J. Sherman Residence, 7228 South Evanston Avenue	1937		
	Loew's Delman Theater (1400 seats), 2335 East 15th Street	1938	W. Scott Dunne	Demolished, 1989
	Skelly Oil Company Station, 829 S. Denver Ave.	1938		Demolished
	Arnold Ungerman Residence, 1718 East 37th Street	remodeled 1941		
	People's State Bank, 2408 East Admiral Boulevard	1941		Demolished
	City Veterinary Clinic, 3550 South Peoria Avenue	1942	Joseph R. Koberling	
	Midwest Marble and Tile, 507 South Quaker Avenue	1945		
	Century Geophysical Corp., 6650 East Apache Avenue	1946		
	Day and Nite Cleaners, 1012 S. Elgin Ave	1946	William Wolaver	
	Town and Country Restaurant, 3301 S Peoria	1946		
	Phoenix Cleaners, 125 East 18th Street	1947		
	Newspaper Printing Corp. Office, 317 South Boulder Avenue	1947	John Cushing	
	Morrow Geophysical Building, 3345 South Harvard Avenue	1948		Architecturally lost. Remodeling has removed Art Deco elements.
	Parkcade Parking Garage, 2nd Street and Boston	1949	Henry R. Lohman Construction Company	Demolished, 1973
	Mayo Motor Inn, 416 South Cheyenne Avenue	1950	Leon B. Senter and Associates	
	Baehler Brothers Service Station, 3702 South Peoria Avenue	1950		Demolished, 2015
	Big Ten Ballroom (American Beauty), 1632 East Apache Street	1950		
	Southwestern Bell Branch Office (The Browns School), 1333 N. Utica			

== Deco Moderne Style ==
Deco Moderne
Image	Building	Date	Architect	Notes
	Tulsa Theater (1400 seats), 215 South Main Street	1941	Corgan & Moore	Demolished, 1973
	Will Rogers Theater (1000 seats), 4502 East 11th Street	1941	Jack Corgan	Demolished, 1976
	Pines Theater (1200 seats), 1515 North Cincinnati Avenue	1944	Corgan & Moore	Demolished, 1966
	Loew's Brook Theater (800 seats), 3307 South Peoria Avenue	1945	William Henry Cameron Calderwood	
	KVOO Radio Station, 3701 S. Peoria (KJRH)	1946		
	Fire Station #7, 601 South Lewis Avenue	1947	Joseph R. Koberling	
	Cove Theater (600 seats), 2321 West 41st Street	1947		Demolished, 1955
	Fire Station #3, 1339 East 1st Street	1948	John Wesley Robb	Demolished 1966 for I-244
	Fire Station #16, 1401 North Lewis Avenue	1948	John Wesley Robb	
	Fire Station #15, 4162 East Admiral Street	1948	Hanton and Wilson	
	Peoria Theater (800 seats), 2541 North Peoria Avenue	1948		Demolished, 1985
	Rex Theater (600 seats), 2545 East Admiral Place	1948 Deco Moderne remodel due to extensive fire and water damage		closed
	Rialto Theater (1200 seats), 17 West 3rd Street	1948 Deco remodel of 1905 Empress Theater	Leon B. Senter	Demolished, 1972
	Royal Theater (800 seats), 2637 East 11th Street	1948, (converted to ballroom in the mid '50s)	Hill, Sorey, & Hill	Demolished, 1991
	Fire Station #14, 3602 South Lewis Avenue	1950	Joseph R. Koberling	
	Fire Station # 17, 1351 North Sheridan	1953	Hanton and Wilson	
	Fire Station #3, 1013 East 3rd Street	1909 remodeled 1948		
	Home Federal Savings (BOK), 31st and Harvard	1956	Koberling and Brandberg	
	KVOO Television Studio (KJRH), 3701 S. Peoria	1956	Koberling and Brandberg	

== Art Deco Revival ==
Revival
Image	Building	Date	Architect	Notes
	Metro Diner, 3001 East 11th Street, Rt 66	1980		
	MTTA Downtown Transfer Center, 4th and Denver	1999		
	Myers-Duren Harley Davidson, 4848 S. Peoria	1999		
