= University Club Tower (Tulsa) =

Skyscraper in Tulsa, Oklahoma

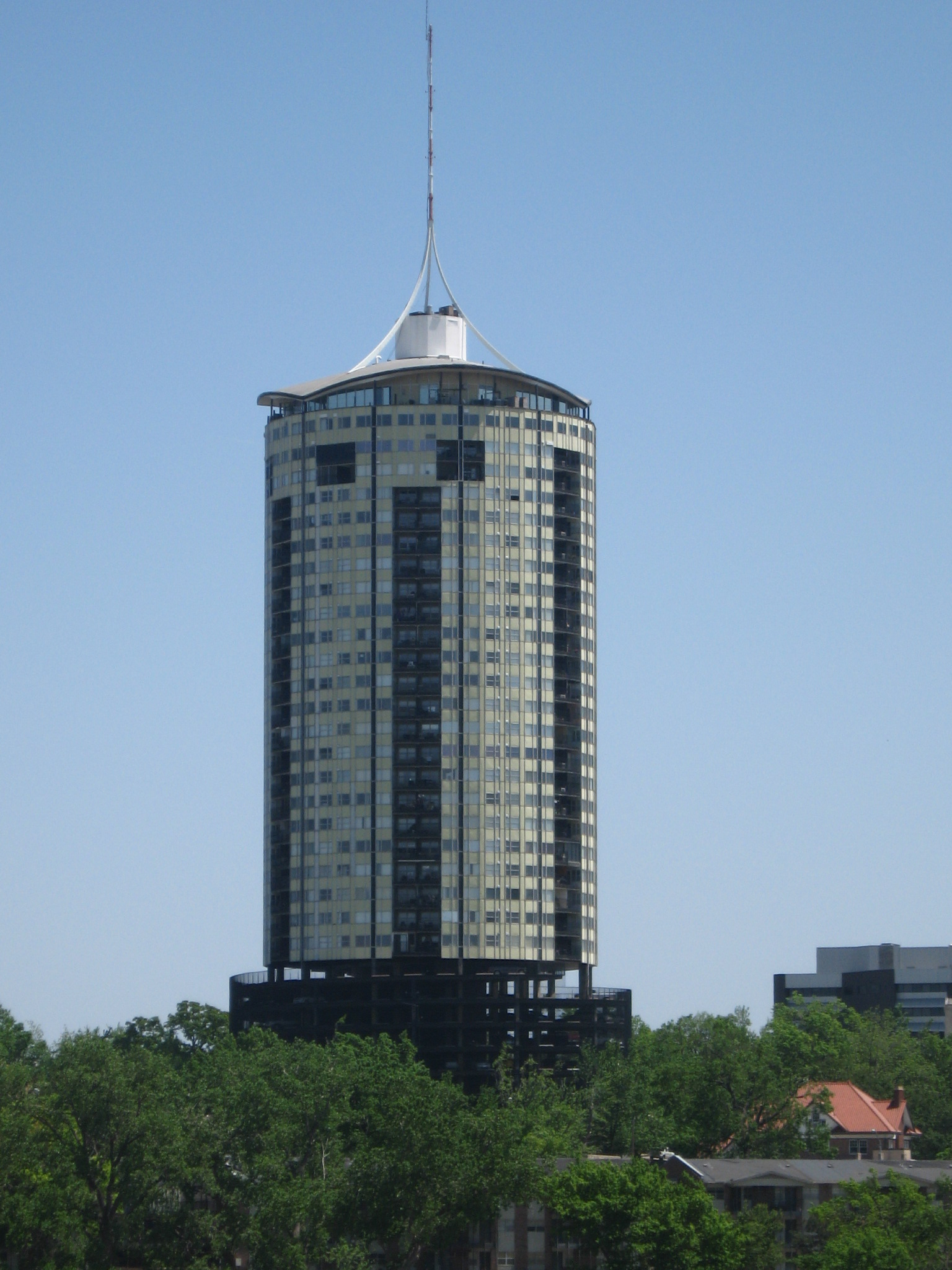
- The University Club Tower, the tallest residential building in Oklahoma
- Interactive map of the University Club Tower area

General information
- Type: Residential
- Location: 1722 South Carson Street, Tulsa, Oklahoma, United States
- Coordinates: 36°08′14″N 95°59′28″W
- Completed: 1966
- Opening: 1966

Height
- Roof: 377 ft (115 m)

Technical details
- Floor count: 32

Design and construction
- Architects: Bob Piland; Jack Butz
- Structural engineer: Fred N. Gauger PE; Bill Martin PE

The University Club Tower is a residential skyscraper in the Riverview Historic District of Tulsa, Oklahoma. The building rises 377 feet (115 m). It contains 32 floors and was completed in 1966. The University Club Tower currently stands as the 8th-tallest building in the city, and the 15th-tallest building in the state of Oklahoma. It also currently stands as the tallest all-residential building in Tulsa and Oklahoma. The circular building, marked by unusual floor plans surrounding its central core, was the first major building in the United States to be designed using a computer.

== See also ==
- List of tallest buildings in Tulsa
- Buildings of Tulsa
