= Mayo Hotel =

Hotel in Tulsa, Oklahoma

- U.S. National Register of Historic Places
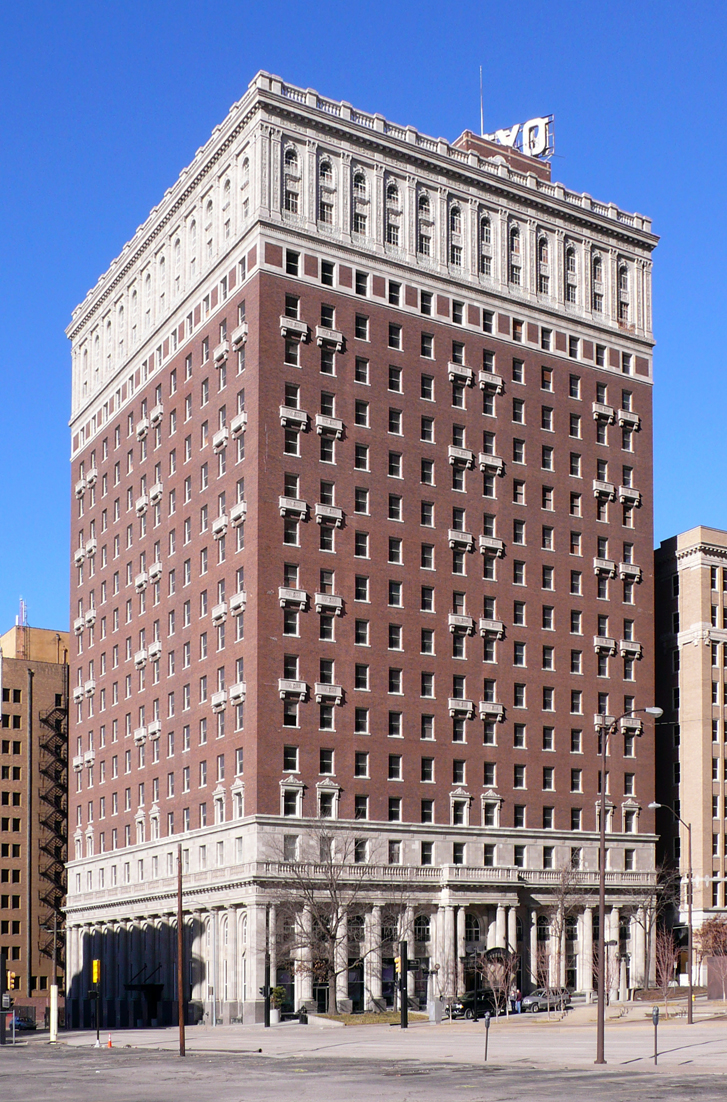
- The Mayo Hotel
- Location: Tulsa, OK
- Coordinates: 36°9′3.2″N 95°59′31.16″W
- Built: 1925
- Architect: George Winkler
- NRHP reference No.: 80003303
- Added to NRHP: June 27, 1980

The Mayo Hotel is an historic hotel that opened in 1925 at 115 West 5th Street in downtown Tulsa, Oklahoma.

== History ==
=== Early years ===
The Mayo Hotel was built in 1925, designed by architect George Winkler, and financed by John D. and Cass A. Mayo. The base of two-story Doric columns supports fourteen floors marked with false terracotta balconies, and a two-story crown of stone and a dentiled cornice At the time the 600-room hotel was the tallest building in Oklahoma. Ceiling fans in each room and Tulsa's first running ice water made the hotel a haven from summer heat.

Original luggage sticker from the Mayo Hotel- ca. 1930s

The Mayo hosted many of Tulsa's most notable 20th-century visitors, including President John F. Kennedy, Bob Hope, Charles Lindbergh, Babe Ruth, Jack Dempsey, Will Rogers, Charlie Chaplin and Mae West. It was also the residence of some notable oilmen of the era, including J. Paul Getty. In William Inge's 1953 Pulitzer Prize winning play, Picnic, the Mayo Hotel is where the lead character Hal intends to find work as a bellhop.

In 1951, the segregated hotel had its first black guest, when President Harry Truman personally phoned the hotel from the White House and asked that his daughter Margaret be allowed to bring her black maid into the hotel. She was still required to use the service elevator, however.

=== Decline ===
In 1955, the original two-story lobby was reduced to one floor, with a new function room, the Pompeian Court, created in the former lobby space on the mezzanine level.

In 1968, the Mayo family sold the hotel to Fairmont Hotels, which renamed it the Fairmont Mayo Hotel. Fairmont sold the hotel to Gateway Hotel Corp. in 1977, and it returned to its original name. In 1980, the hotel was listed on the National Register of Historic Places. On January 9, 1981, Daon Corp, a Newport Beach subsidiary of a Vancouver-based firm, bought the hotel for $4.6 million, announcing plans to refurbish the property.

=== Closure ===
Daon closed the hotel in early 1981, for what they announced would be a 12 to 14-month renovation, which would involve restoring the original two-story lobby, combining and enlarging the guest rooms, and adding new dining options. They sold the hotel's fittings, laid off the hotel's staff, and began gutting the interior, tearing out the floors and walls. However, by November 1981, they had ceased work. Daon refused to comment publicly, but put the now shuttered and partially-stripped structure up for sale in December 1981.

The abandoned, incomplete renovation left the building unoccupied and missing many of its original fixtures and its interior ornamentation. In 1987, Bruce Robson, Joe Robson and Jack Neely purchased the Mayo, announcing plans to reopen it as a luxury hotel. They proposed various restoration concepts over the 13 years they owned the property, but eventually put it up for sale after Tulsa voters rejected a measure in November 2000 to finance a new convention center, which would have brought more guests to a reopened hotel.

=== Restoration ===
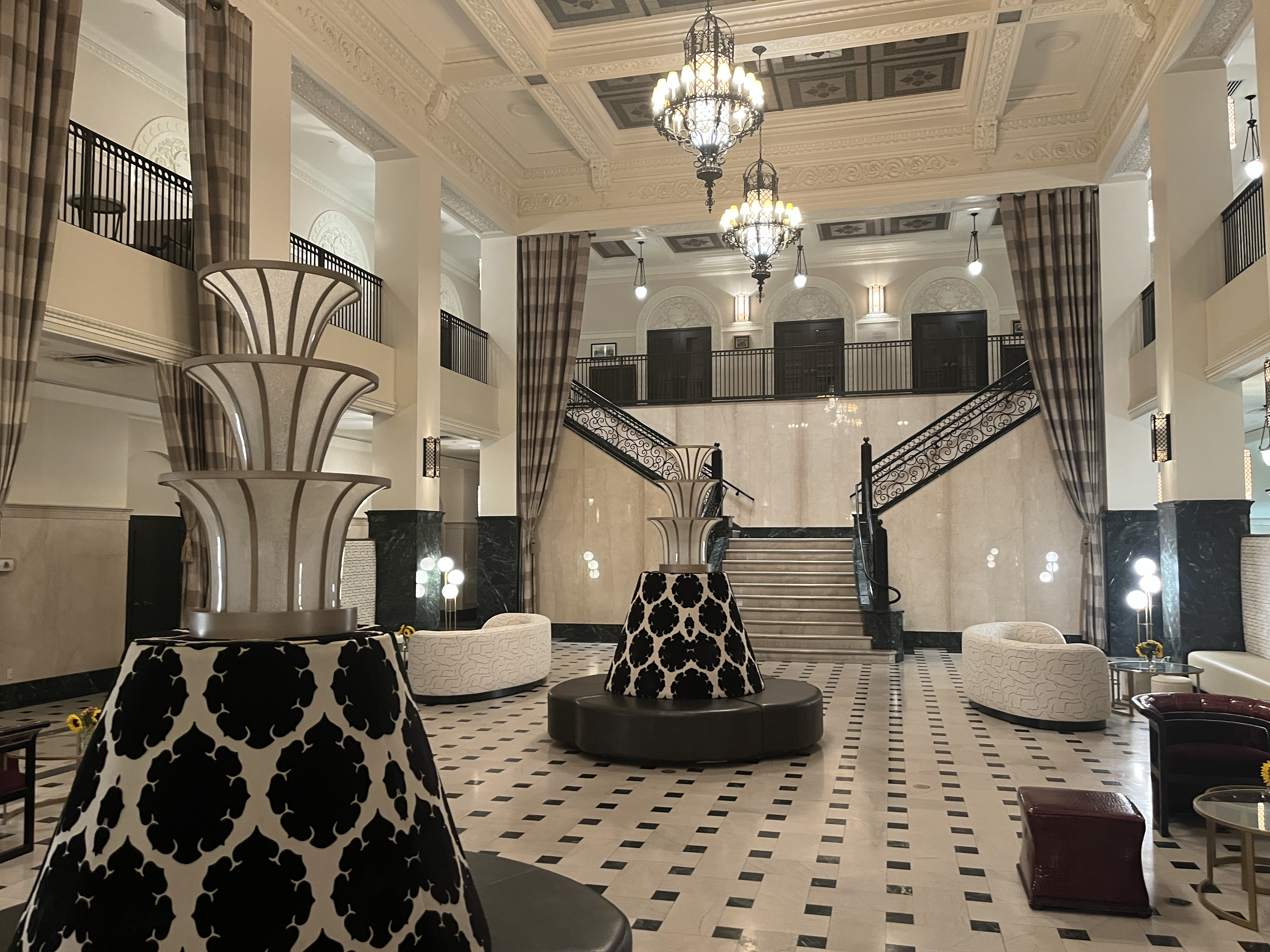
Mayo Hotel lobby

Vacant for 20 years, the Mayo seemed destined for demolition until June 2001, when John Snyder purchased it for $250,000 and began renovation. Initial efforts focused on restoring the lower floors. The partially-flooded basement was drained of water and renovated as a public parking garage, which opened in 2002. The revenue from the garage financed the renovation of the historic ground floor public rooms, which reopened in 2003 and quickly became a popular venue for galas, proms, receptions and meetings. An $11.2 million project to convert seven upper floors into 76 loft apartments began in 2008..

$4.9 million in public funds were allocated to the project from the Tulsa County development package known as "Vision 2025" approved by voters in 2003. The hotel owners provided an additional $6.3 million. The total cost of the renovation was reported to be $40 million. As part of this renovation, the Mayo also became the first Oklahoma building to complete environmental remediation under a new brownfields program sponsored by the Oklahoma Corporation Commission. The renovation project paid special attention to restoring the hotel's noted Crystal Ballroom (so named because of its crystal chandeliers) to return it to its 1920s grandeur.

Apartment tenants began moving into the restored building in late August 2009. The 102-room hotel portion opened privately for its first guest, Britney Spears, who booked 80 rooms for her tour stop in Tulsa on September 15, 2009. The hotel opened for business in late September 2009. A formal grand reopening was held in December 2009. Since then, the hotel has hosted numerous famous guests, including OneRepublic, Lady Gaga, James Taylor, Justin Bieber, Bob Seger, Fleetwood Mac, and Josh Groban.

== In popular culture ==
In the 2022 Paramount+ television series Tulsa King, main character Dwight "The General" Manfredi, portrayed by Sylvester Stallone, resides in the Mayo Hotel.

== See also ==
- List of tallest buildings in Tulsa

Preceded by Cosden Building	Tallest Building in Tulsa; 1925—1927; 77m	Succeeded by Philtower Building
