= BOK Tower =

Skyscraper in Tulsa, Oklahoma, US

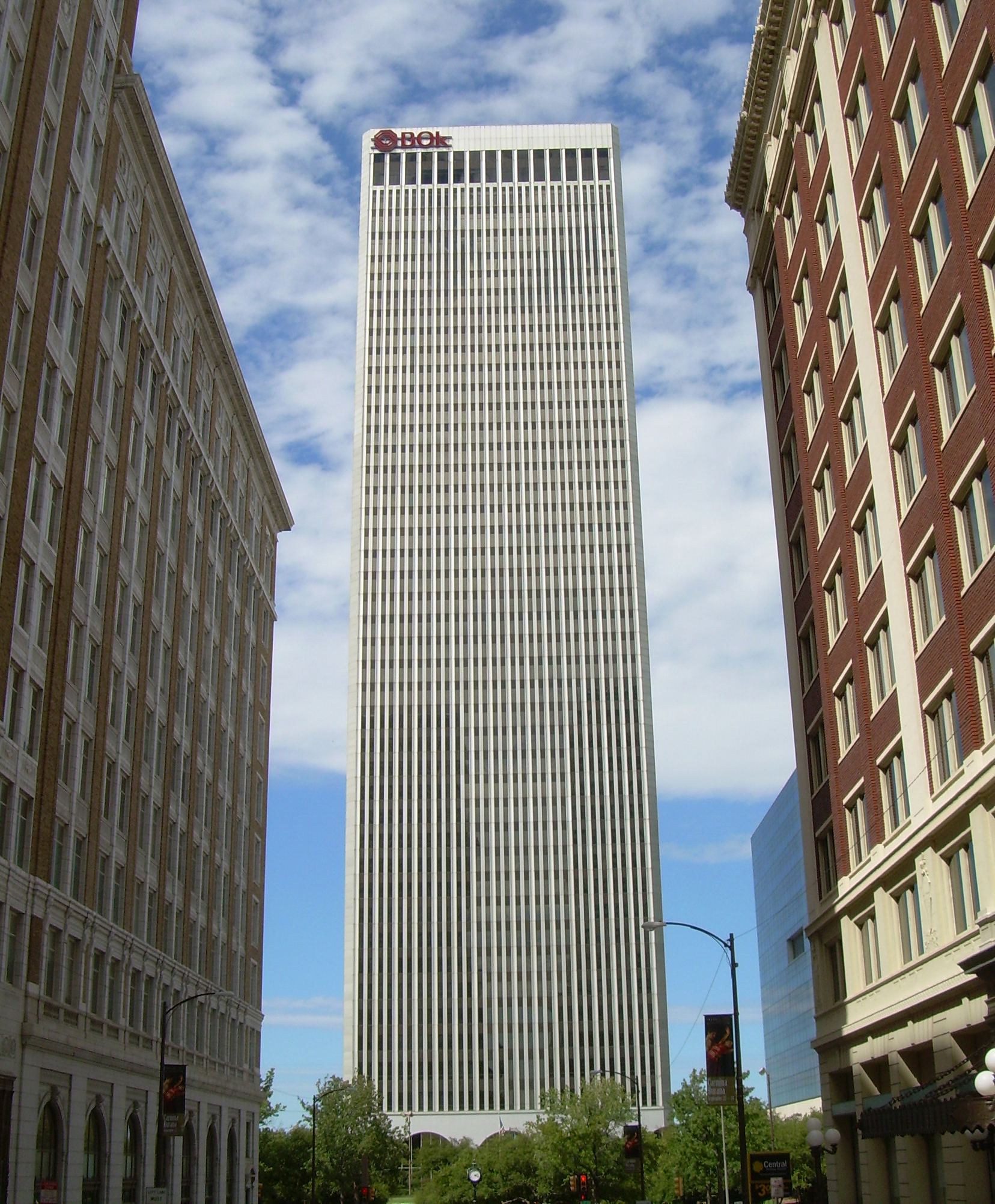
- Interactive map of the BOK Tower area

General information
- Status: Completed
- Type: Office
- Location: Tulsa, Oklahoma, United States
- Coordinates: 36.1550°N 95.9903°W
- Completed: 1976

Height
- Roof: 667 ft (203 m)

Technical details
- Floor count: 52
- Floor area: 1,140,673 sq ft (105,972.0 m^{2})

Design and construction
- Architect: Yamasaki & Associates

BOK Tower (named for the Bank of Oklahoma; formerly known as One Williams Center) is a skyscraper in Downtown Tulsa, Oklahoma. At 667 feet (203 m) in height, the 52-story tower was the tallest building in Oklahoma until it was surpassed by Devon Tower in 2011. It was built in 1976 and designed by Minoru Yamasaki & Associates, the same architect who designed the World Trade Center's Twin Towers in New York City. This structure is based closely on Tower 1; former CEO John Williams liked the design of the WTC so much he hired the same architect to build him a 1/2 scale model of Tower 1.

== Design and history ==
BOK Tower's lobby has marble walls and wall hangings similar to those in the former World Trade Center's Twin Towers in New York. BOK Tower was built for the Williams Companies, whose CEO at the time, John Williams, decided to choose Minoru Yamasaki, the architect of the Twin Towers in New York, as the office building's designer. Originally, Yamasaki designed two 30-story replicas for the project in Tulsa. However, prior to construction, Williams wanted a more 'dramatic' design. According to Williams, he presented this idea by stacking a tower model on top of the other. As a result, the plan for a quarter scale replica was changed to a single 52-story tower, double the height of the two planned towers. The similarities to the World Trade Center led executives to joke that the architects just halved the plans for a World Trade Center tower.

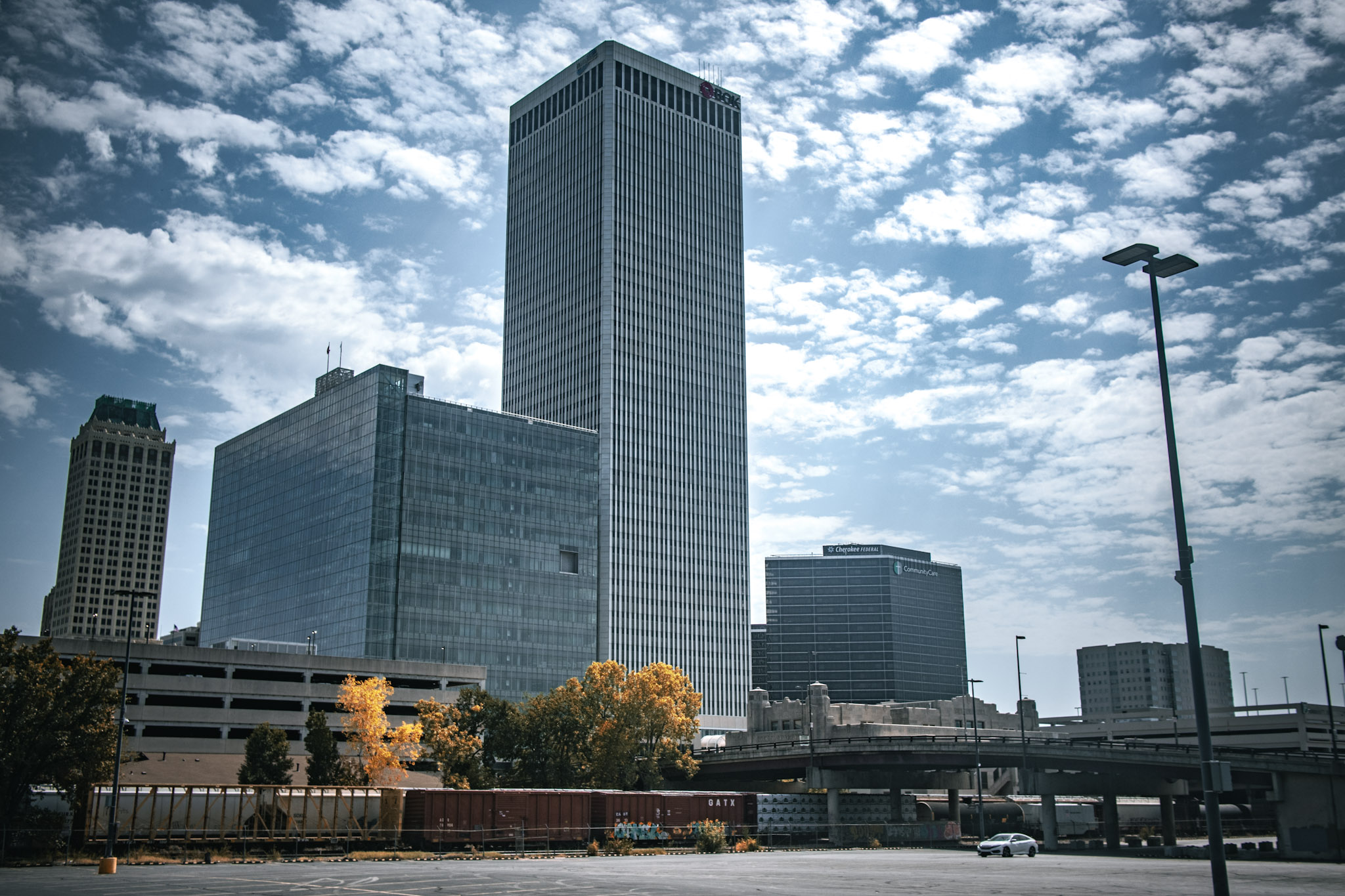
BOK Tower, Tulsa, Oklahoma, August 2023, viewed from M.L.K. Jr Blvd.

BOK Tower, as completed, was the tallest building in Oklahoma and contained 1,100,000 square feet (100,000 m^{2}) of office space. Within four months of its completion, BOK Tower was 80 percent occupied.

In December 2005, a water main broke and flooded electrical equipment in the basement. In 2006, BOK Tower underwent $16 million in repairs and renovations. $6 million was spent on renovated pedestrian bridges, granite coating for the base, new fitness centers, and windows. The remaining $10 million was used to fix damage from the 2005 flood.

== See also ==
- List of tallest buildings by U.S. state
- List of tallest buildings in Oklahoma
- List of tallest buildings in Tulsa

| Preceded by First Place Tower | Tallest Building in Tulsa; 1976—Present; 203m | Succeeded by None |
