= ConsumerAffairs =

American customer review and news platform

- Type: Private
- Industry: Consumer protection Industry self regulation
- Founded: 1998; 28 years ago
- Founder: Jim Hood
- Headquarters: Tulsa, Oklahoma, U.S.
- Key people: Zac Carman (CEO); Sam Mischner (President & CCO); Adam Joffe (CTO); Chang Paik (CFO)
- Number of employees: 230 (2021)
- Website: www.consumeraffairs.com

ConsumerAffairs is an American customer review and consumer news platform that provides information for purchasing decisions around major life changes or milestones. The company's business-facing division provides SaaS that allows brands to manage and analyze review data to improve their products and customer service. ConsumerAffairs was founded in 1998 by Jim Hood. The company has been headquartered in Tulsa, Oklahoma since 2010 and also has offices in Austin, Texas, the Philippines, Argentina, and Lisbon, Portugal.

== History ==
The company was founded in 1998 by Jim Hood, an Associated Press executive, editor and reporter, as an easier way of collecting consumer opinions.

In 2010, the company was purchased by Zac Carman. The company moved to Tulsa, Oklahoma the same year.

In 2015, the company had a $1.1 million renovation of the Petroleum Building in the Oil Capital Historic District. The renovation was to increase their employee base from 120 to 220.

In 2024, ConsumerAffairs opened a European headquarters in Lisbon, Portugal, to better serve EU consumers under GDPR compliance.

== Criticism ==
In October 21, 2014, Truth in Advertising published "Who is ConsumerAffairs.com Really Advocating For?" In the article, Unbeatablesale.com complained to the Electronic Retailing Self-Regulation Program, a division of the Better Business Bureaus and National Advertising Review Council, that ConsumerAffairs unfairly portrays companies negatively if they don’t pay for its “ConsumerAffairs for Brands” service, which lets brands respond to customer reviews. The ERSP found that ConsumerAffairs hadn’t adequately disclosed its paid affiliations and recommended clearer disclosure. ConsumerAffairs then added a banner indicating whether a company is a paying affiliate. Of its 115 paying companies, 80% had ratings of 3.5 stars or higher.

== See also ==
- Better Business Bureau
- Consumer Reports
- Reputation management
