= Mayo Building (Tulsa, Oklahoma) =

Building in Tulsa, Oklahoma

- U.S. National Register of Historic Places
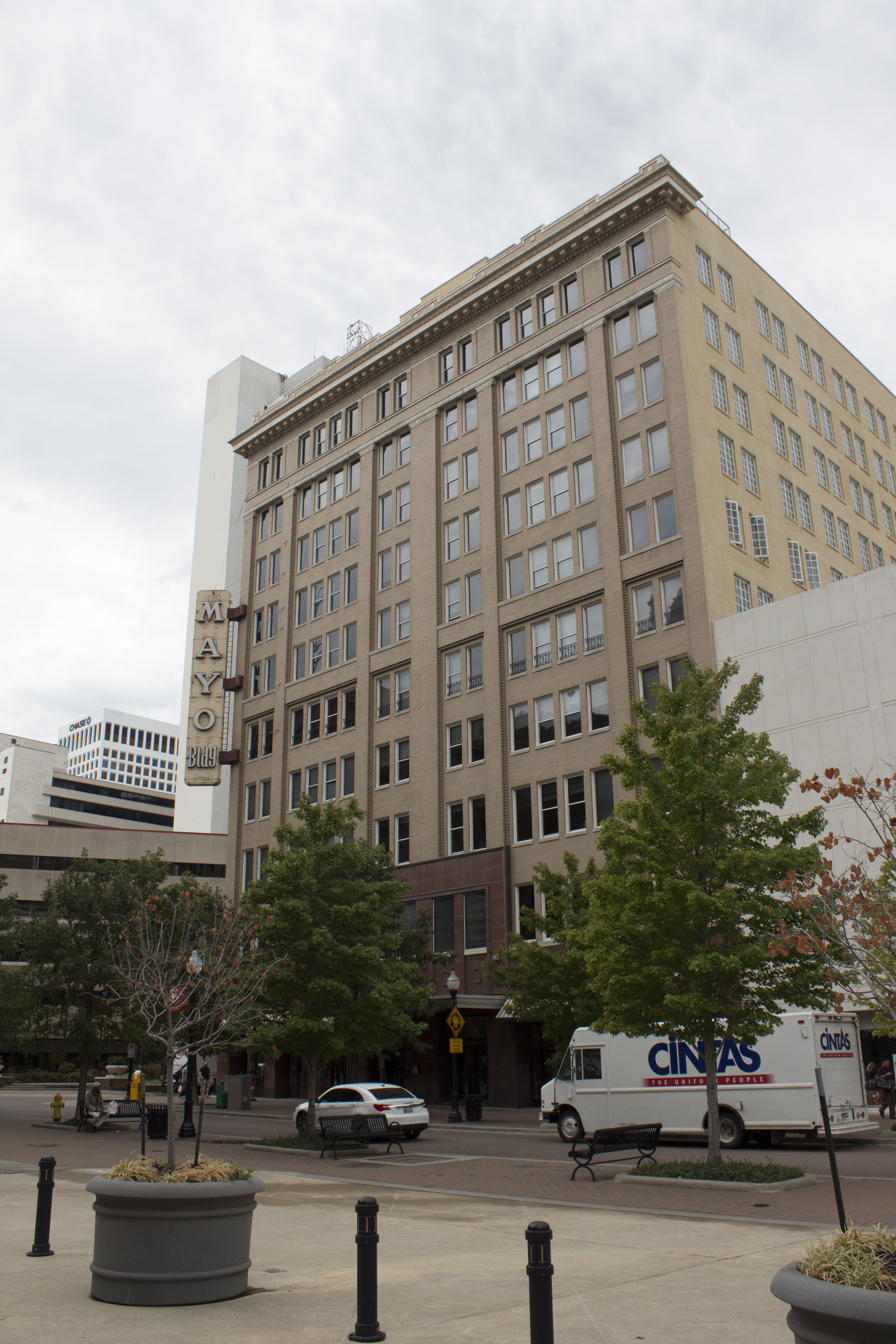

- Location within Oklahoma Location within the United States
- Location: 420 S. Main St., Tulsa, Oklahoma
- Coordinates: 36°9′5.7234″N 95°59′25.908″W
- Area: 1 acre (0.40 ha)
- Built: 1910
- Architect: McDonald, Charles A. & Winkler, George; Koberling, Joseph and Brandborg, Lennart
- Architectural style: Classical Revival
- NRHP reference No.: 08001152
- Added to NRHP: December 4, 2008

The Mayo Building at the northwest corner of West Fifth Street and South Main St. in Tulsa, Oklahoma was built in 1910. It had five stories. It was expanded by a duplicate building to the north in 1914, and further expanded by addition of 5 more stories in 1917. It was listed on the National Register of Historic Places (NRHP) in 2008.

According to its NRHP nomination, the building "is one of Tulsa's earliest business/office buildings". The Tulsa Preservation Commission has stated that it is "...the oldest of Tulsa’s existing oil business buildings."

== History ==
The Mayo Brothers, who had established a thriving furniture business in 1904, moved to a rented building on Main Street in 1906. They decided they needed more space, and began construction of the building at 420 South Main in 1909. They used half the space for their own business and rented the rest of the building as offices for oil companies. As the demand for office space increased, the Mayos built an identical five-story building at 418 South Main in 1914. In 1917, they added five more stories to each structure, and operated them as one building. Profits from the Mayo Building financed later additions to the Mayo real estate empire: the Petroleum Building in 1921, the Mayo Hotel in 1925 and the Mayo Motor Inn in 1950.

On October 24, 1917, a fire at the building claimed the lives of two firefighters from the Tulsa Fire Department. Ross Shepard, 29 years old and Ben Hanes, 27 years old, were taken to their death when a stairway they were fighting fire from collapsed. They were the first two deaths in the line of duty from the department and remain, to this day, the only two to have been killed in a structure fire since the department was founded in 1905.

The building has now been converted to loft apartment use. It was identified as one of the supporting structures during the creation of the Oil Capital Historic District.
