= Pythian Building =

Historic building in Tulsa, Oklahoma

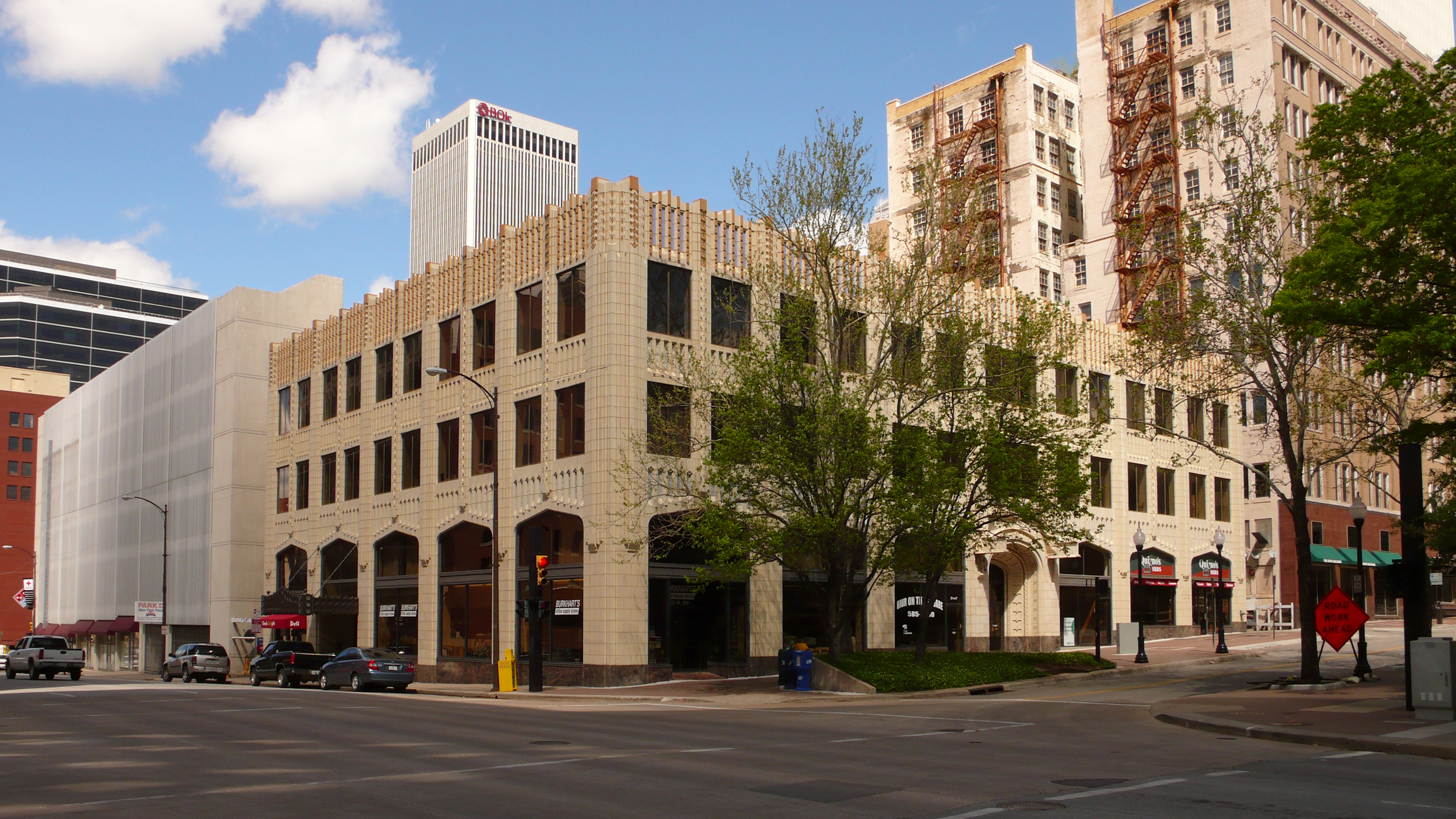
- Pythian Building (formerly Gillette-Tyrell Building) in 2007
- Interactive map of the Pythian Building area
- Former names: Gillette-Tyrrell Building

General information
- Architectural style: Art Deco
- Location: 423 South Boulder Avenue, Tulsa, Oklahoma, United States
- Coordinates: 36.1514°N 95.9911°W
- Named for: J. M. Gillette and H. C. Tyrrell
- Groundbreaking: 1929
- Construction stopped: 1931
- Owner: Price Family Properties

Technical details
- Floor count: 3
- Lifts/elevators: 2
- Grounds: 43,000

Design and construction
- Architect: Edward W. Saunders

The Pythian Building is a building in downtown Tulsa, Oklahoma. It was begun in 1929 by two Tulsa oilmen, J. M. Gillette (Note: J. M. Gillette was the namesake of the Tulsa residential area now known as the Gillette Historic District.) and H. C. Tyrrell. They initially planned to construct a three-story office building at 432 S. Boulder Avenue, topped by a ten-story hotel, but these plans were canceled during the Great Depression and they stopped construction at the third floor. In 1931, they sold it to the Knights of Pythias, who decided to complete it as an office building and renamed it the Pythian Building.

The building was added to the National Register of Historic Places (NRHP) on January 21, 1982 (NRIS #82003703). The application lists its architecture as a mix of the Art Deco styles: Modern and Zig Zag. It is also listed as a contributing property on the NRHP Application for the Oil Capital Historic District (NRIS #10001013).

== Exterior description ==
The building is located on the northeast corner of West 5th Street and South Boulder Avenue, with entrances on both streets, connected inside by an L-shaped lobby. Each entrance originally was covered with a lighted projecting canopy. The Boulder Avenue canopy is made of steel, constructed with a lace-like design. The 5th street canopy was steel clad in terra cotta. (Note: This canopy was removed later for unknown reasons.)

The exterior has seven east-west and five north-south bays. The facade is divided by thin vertical piers that run from its base to the top of the parapet, and are decorated with back-to-back diamond patterns (zig-zags), a theme throughout the building. Spandrels are highlighted with blue terra cotta accents. The areas between the piers are covered with a thin layer of cream-colored terra cotta. The roofline is colored with blue, burnt sienna and green terra cotta. Openings between the piers at the ground-floor level have a Tudor arch design, filled with glass framed with steel in a bundled-reed design.

== Interior description ==
The lobby floor is tiled and repeats the zig-zag design pattern of the exterior. (Note: Coffey says that the effect is similar to design of a New Mexico Indian blanket.) The tiling extends up the walls to reach a high perimeter wainscot.

The east end of the lobby contains a staircase that leads to a second floor balcony. Beneath the staircase are two elevators that lead to the second and third floors. Interior windows of the second-floor offices look out over the lobby. Another lobby access leads to the building basement. The ceiling that extends across the lobby from the balcony appears to be covered with a large skylight. Instead it is a large lighting fixture whose glass lens is designed to resemble a folded plate. It was considered an extremely novel design at the time.

Eight tall slender chandeliers, each with four etched glass panels which terminate in a triangle design top and bottom, also are installed in the ceiling to provide additional light. Empire Chandelier Manufacturing Company of Sand Springs designed and fabricated these.

== Current status ==
In 2012, then-owner Kanbar Properties, a California investment firm, put the building up for sale at a sealed bid auction. Minimum bid was announced as $1.4 million, and bids were due July 10, 2012. The bid announcement said that the building was then 69 percent occupied. Kanbar had bought this building in 2005, along with several other Tulsa properties at the same time.

Results of the 2012 were not publicly announced at the time. But, in 2017, a Tulsa newspaper article indicated that developer W. Stuart Price and his family firm, Price Family Properties, had bought a major interest in Kanbar's Tulsa real estate portfolio in that year. The Gillette-Tyrell building was one of the 13 properties that was included in the package. The article suggests that since 2012, Price had bought full ownership of the 18 properties Kanbar once owned in the city. The value of individual buildings were not disclosed. Collectively they were said to represent about half of the commercial real estate in the Central Business District.
