= United States Post Office and Courthouse (Tulsa, Oklahoma) =

- U.S. National Register of Historic Places
- U.S. Historic district – Contributing property
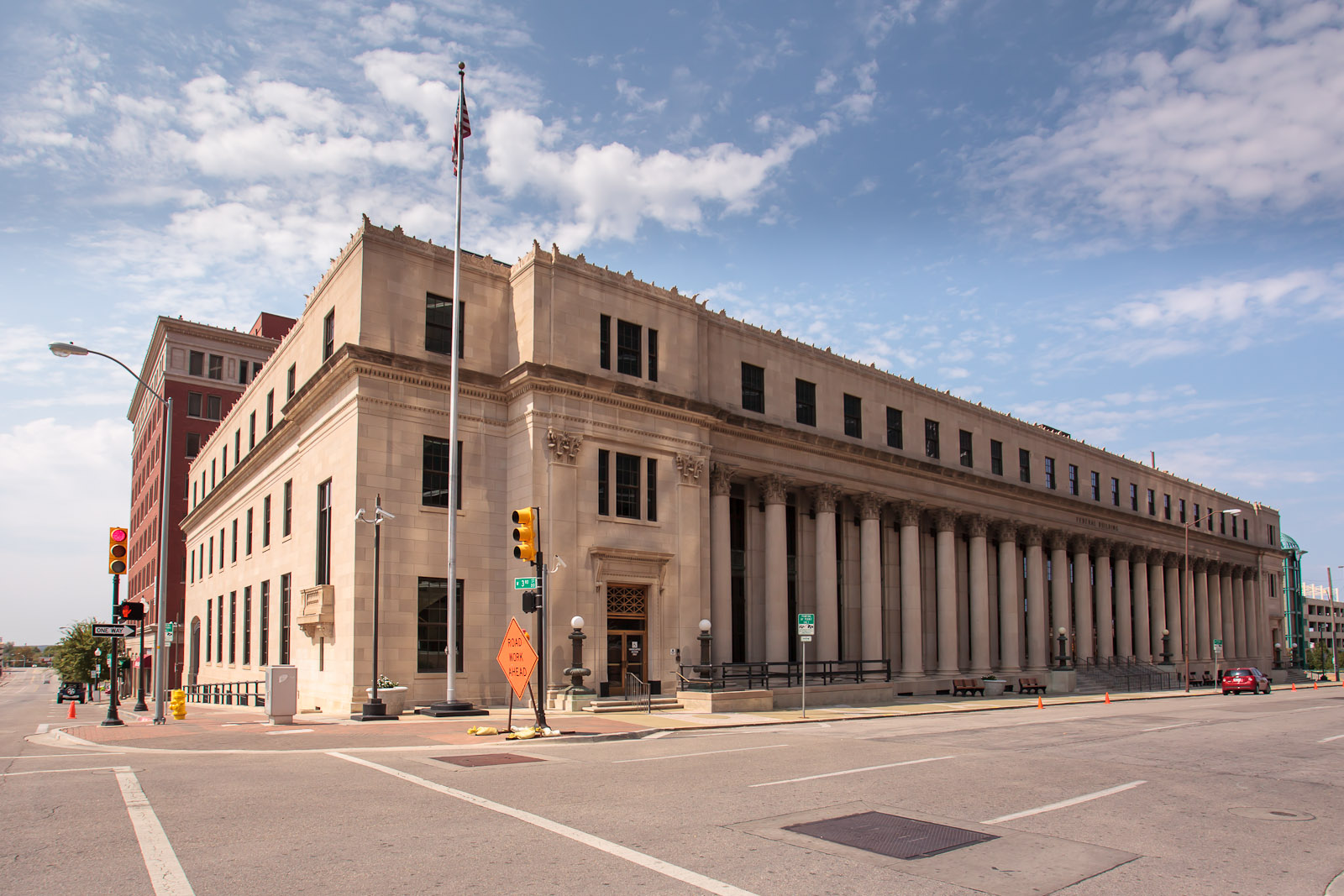
- Former United States Post Office and Courthouse, Tulsa, Oklahoma. Courtesy W. R. Oswald. September 23, 2012.

- Location within Oklahoma Location within the United States
- Location: 224 S. Boulder Ave., Tulsa, Oklahoma
- Coordinates: 36°9′12″N 95°59′33″W
- Area: less than one acre
- Built: 1917
- Architect: Wetmore, James; Yeager, M. & Son
- Architectural style: Classical Revival
- NRHP reference No.: 00000244
- Added to NRHP: March 24, 2000

The United States Post Office and Court House in Tulsa, Oklahoma, also known as Federal Building, is a federal building of the United States government completed in 1917 and located at 224 South Boulder Avenue. The supervising architect for both the original construction and a substantial extension completed in 1933 was James A. Wetmore. The building houses a post office and housed the United States District Court for the Eastern District of Oklahoma from 1917 to 1925, when the districts were reconfigured and it became a courthouse of the Northern District of Oklahoma.

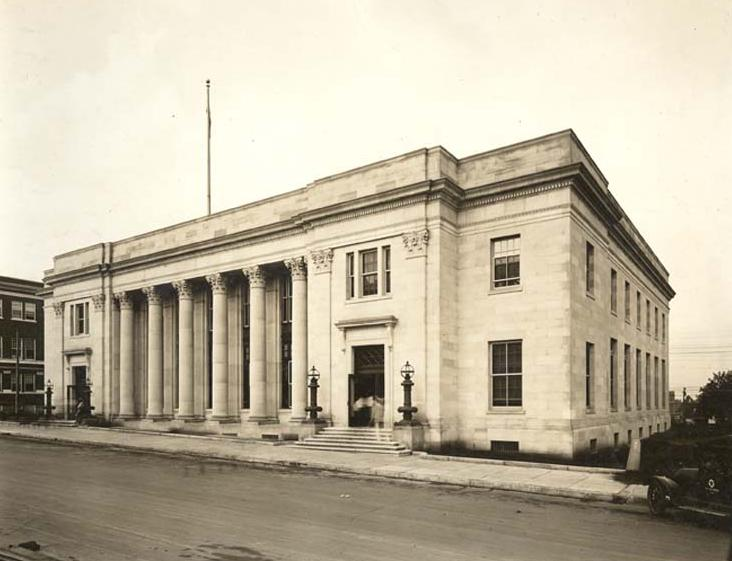
The building as it appeared in 1917.

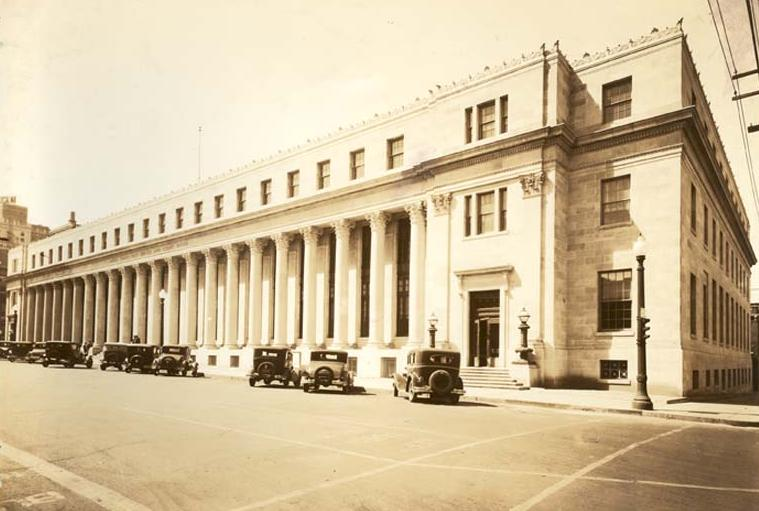
The building as it appeared in 1934.

Built in the Classical Revival style, the building has been described as "the postal beauty of the southwest… a marble, bronze and granite memorial to its builders".

It served historically as a post office, as a courthouse, and as a government office building.

== History ==
The post office and courts relocated to the Page Belcher Federal Building, after it was completed. The former post office building was remodeled, then occupied by the Army Corps of Engineers in the mid 1960s. The building was remodeled again in 1996, after the Corps of Engineers moved to another location. It is now occupied by the U. S. Bankruptcy Court, the National Labor Relations Board and some district court judicial offices.

It was listed on the National Register of Historic Places on March 24, 2000, as United States Post Office and Courthouse. The building was also identified as a contributing structure for the Oil Capital Historic District.
