= Clinton–Hardy House =

Historic house in Oklahoma, United States

- U.S. National Register of Historic Places
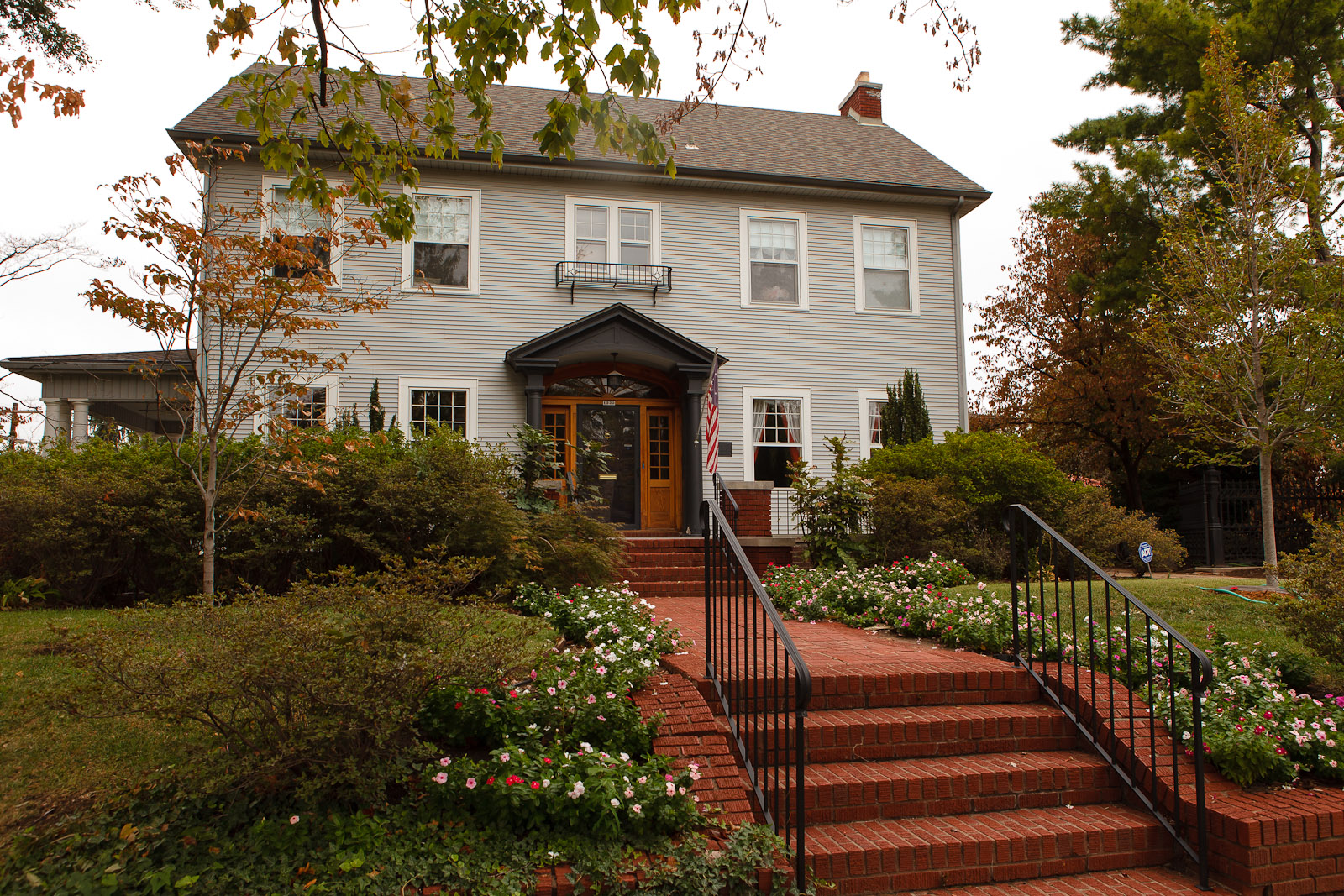

- Location within Oklahoma Location within the United States
- Location: 1322 S. Guthrie, Tulsa, Oklahoma
- Coordinates: 36°8′34″N 95°59′45″W
- Area: less than one acre
- Built: 1919
- Architect: George Winkler
- Architectural style: Georgian Colonial
- NRHP reference No.: 79002027
- Added to NRHP: January 23, 1979

The Clinton–Hardy House on S. Guthrie in Tulsa, Oklahoma was built in 1919. It was designed by architect George Winkler and built for Mr. and Mrs. Lee Clinton. It was listed on the National Register of Historic Places in 1979.

== Description ==
The house was sited on a bluff on the east bank of the Arkansas River and has a brick wall around it on three sides. The structure consists of four levels containing 14 rooms with 5,500 square feet (510 m^{2}). of floor space.

It includes elements older than the house itself, namely its entrance door, sidelights, and fan light, that were taken from an older residence in New Orleans.

The main (ground level) floor has a large entry foyer with a curved oak staircase. The dining room is to the right, with a butler's pantry and the kitchen. The living room and a sun porch are also on the ground floor. The second floor contains four bedrooms and two bathrooms. The third floor consists of a full-height, floored attic. A separate stairway leads to this level. The basement has a boiler room, coal bin, wine and canning cellar, storage room and a laundry.

== Owner ==
Lee Clinton (1875–1956) was born in Red Fork, Indian Territory. In 1896, he was hired by the Tulsa Banking Company. Ten years later, he co-founded the Bank of Commerce with his brother-in-law, James H. McBirney. In 1916, he founded the Union National Bank of Tulsa, which he housed in the Clinton Building. Besides banking and real estate, Clinton was interested in cattle raising. He and oilman William G. Skelly co-founded the Tulsa Stockyards.

Clinton's first wife, Susan, died in 1952. He remarried, but died in 1958. His widow continued to live in the house until 1972. It was the residence of Mr. and Mrs. Robert B. Hardy when the house was listed on the National Register of Historic Places in 1979.

It is currently owned by Justin and Caley Madalone.
