= Mincks-Adams Hotel =

- U.S. National Register of Historic Places
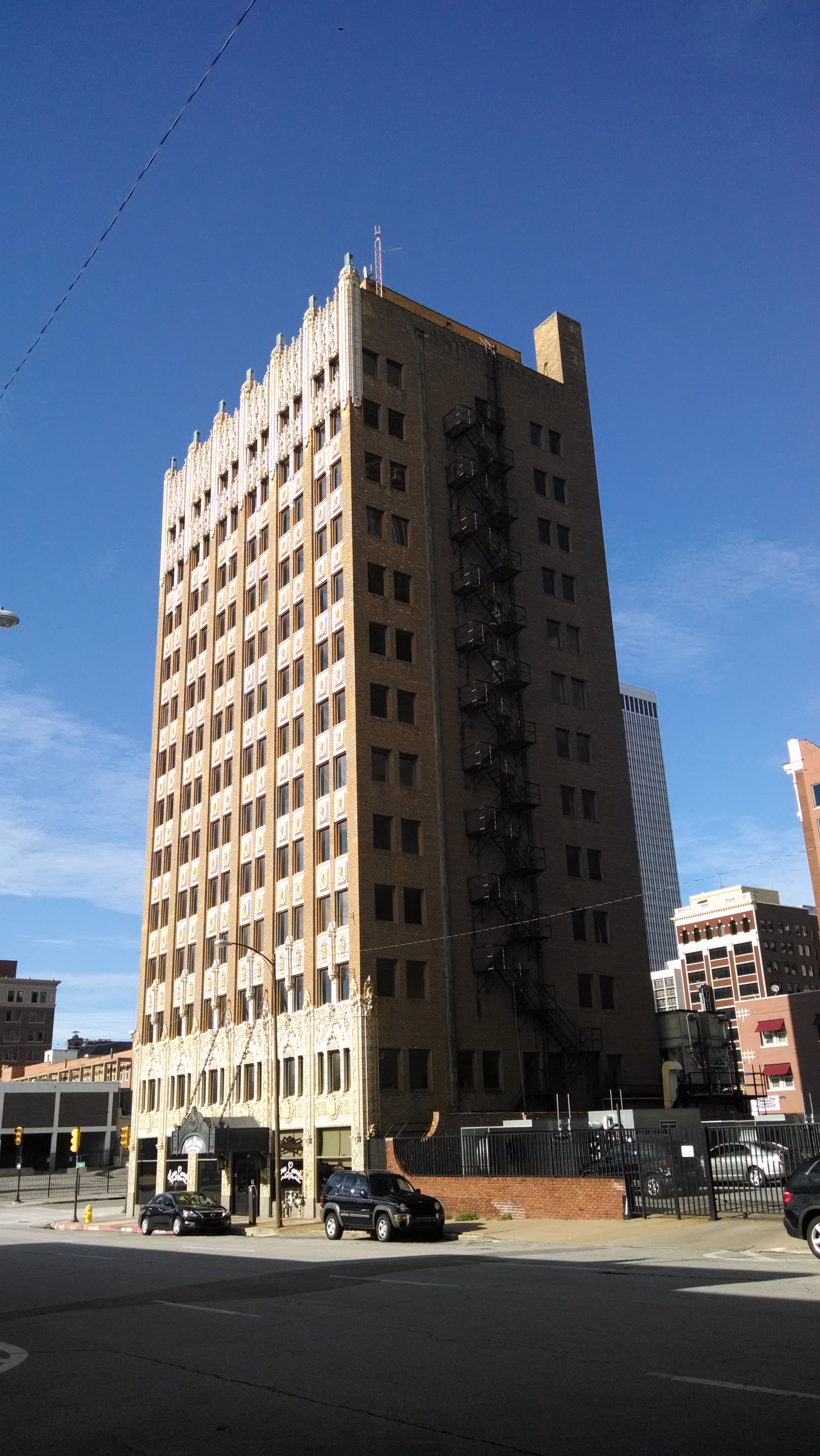
- The hotel in 2014
- Coordinates: 36.15155°N 95.99264°W
- Built: 1927-1928
- Architect: Alfred C. Fabry
- Architectural style: Gothic, Italian Renaissance, Baroque
- NRHP reference No.: 78002273
- Added to NRHP: November 7, 1977

The Mincks-Adams Hotel is located one block west of the Oil Capital Historic District, at 403 Cheyenne Avenue in Downtown Tulsa, Oklahoma. It was constructed in 1927–1928 by businessman I. S. "Ike" Mincks and named the Mincks Hotel. It was a luxury hotel intended to attract businessmen, and was opened for guests in time for the first International Petroleum Exposition. Mincks declared bankruptcy in 1935. The hotel was sold at a liquidation sale and subsequently reopened under new ownership as the Adams Hotel. It was converted to the Adams Office Tower in the early 1980s. The building is noted for its architecture and was listed on the National Register of Historic Places (NRHP) under Criterion C on November 7, 1977, with NRIS number 78002273.

== Building description ==
The Mincks-Adams Hotel sits on a 70 feet (21 m) by 75 feet (23 m) lot. It has 13 stories plus a full-size basement and a penthouse. It was built at a cost of $802,800 and contains 67,473 square feet (6,268.4 m^{2}). Its height is 195 feet (59 m). making it the 18th tallest building in Tulsa. The architect was Alfred C. Fabry.

The building's architectural style has been characterized as a combination of Gothic, Italian Renaissance, and Baroque influences. It was constructed of reinforced concrete, with a facade covered in glazed terra cotta. The terra cotta tiles were made by the Northwestern Terra Cotta Company. Terra cotta was also used inside the building in the lobby, coffee shop and stairwells.

The Tulsa Press Club established its headquarters on the hotel's mezzanine on July 30, 1950. The club moved to the Enterprise Building in 1956. It moved again in 1970 to the Mayo Hotel and eventually back to the Adams Hotel in 1981, but found its old home unsuitable.

The building was sold to developers in December 2017 and is set to be converted into apartments. (Note: A 2014 news item indicated that the former hotel would contain 60 apartments.) The conversion is set to finish in the summer of 2019.
