= George Winkler (architect) =

American architect

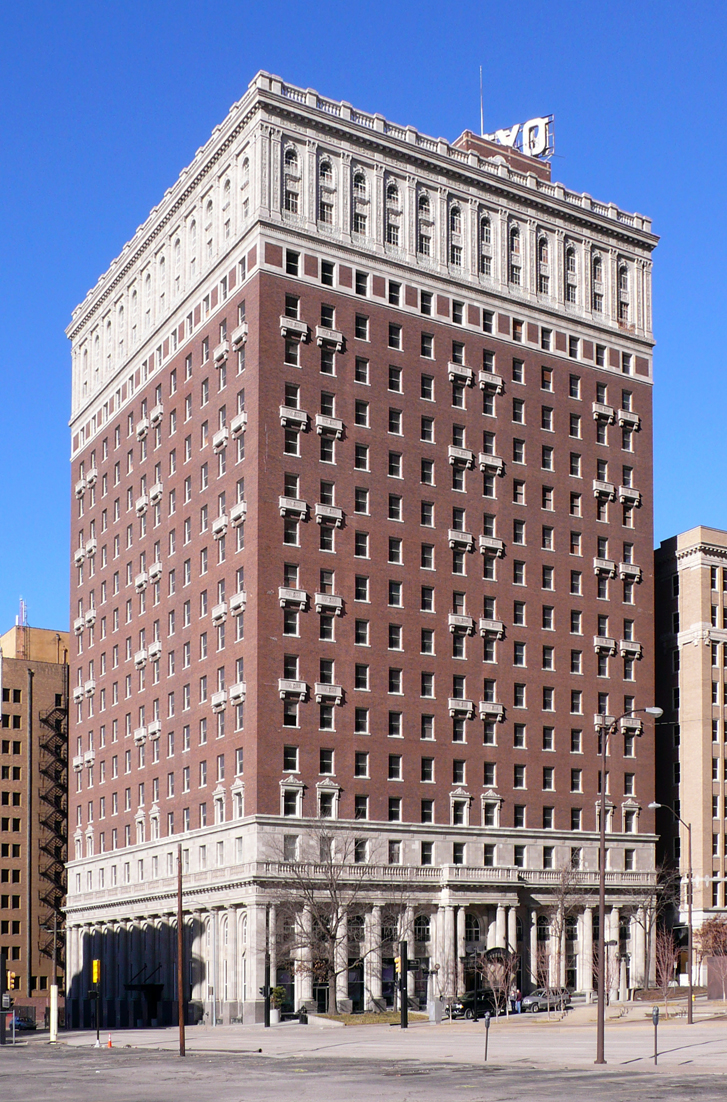
Mayo Hotel

George Winkler (1869–1962) was an American architect who practiced in Pennsylvania, Florida and Oklahoma from 1903 to 1953.

== Background and career ==
Winkler was born in Donegal, Pennsylvania, in 1869 and was educated at Curry College in Pittsburgh, Pennsylvania, Cornell University and Columbia University. He was a member of the following partnerships: Robinson & Winkler, Pittsburgh and Altoona, Pennsylvania (1903–1907); Winkler & McDonald, Tulsa, Oklahoma (1910–1916); Schumacher & Winkler, Tampa, Florida (1926–1930); and Winkler & Reid, Oklahoma City, Oklahoma (1930–1950). A number of his works are listed on the U.S. National Register of Historic Places.

Winkler's works include (with attribution):

- Clinton-Hardy House, aka Lee Clinton Residence, 1322 S. Guthrie, Tulsa, Oklahoma (Winkler, George), NRHP-listed
- Gold Star Memorial Library (1946), Oklahoma City University, Oklahoma City, Oklahoma (Winkler & Reid)
- Holy Family Cathedral (1914), corner 8th and Boulder, Tulsa, Oklahoma (Winkler & MacDonald, and J. P. Curtin, Associated Architects)
- Mayo Building, 420 S. Main Street, Tulsa, Oklahoma (McDonald, Charles A. & G. Winkler; Koberling, Joseph and Brandborg, Lennart), NRHP-listed
- Mayo Hotel (1924), 115 W. 5th Street, Tulsa, Oklahoma (Winkler, George), NRHP-listed
- Oklahoma City Public Library (1950), Oklahoma City, Oklahoma (Winkler & Reid)
- Trinity Episcopal Church, Tulsa, Oklahoma
