= Oil Capital Historic District (Tulsa, Oklahoma) =

Historic district in Oklahoma, United States

- U.S. National Register of Historic Places
- U.S. Historic district
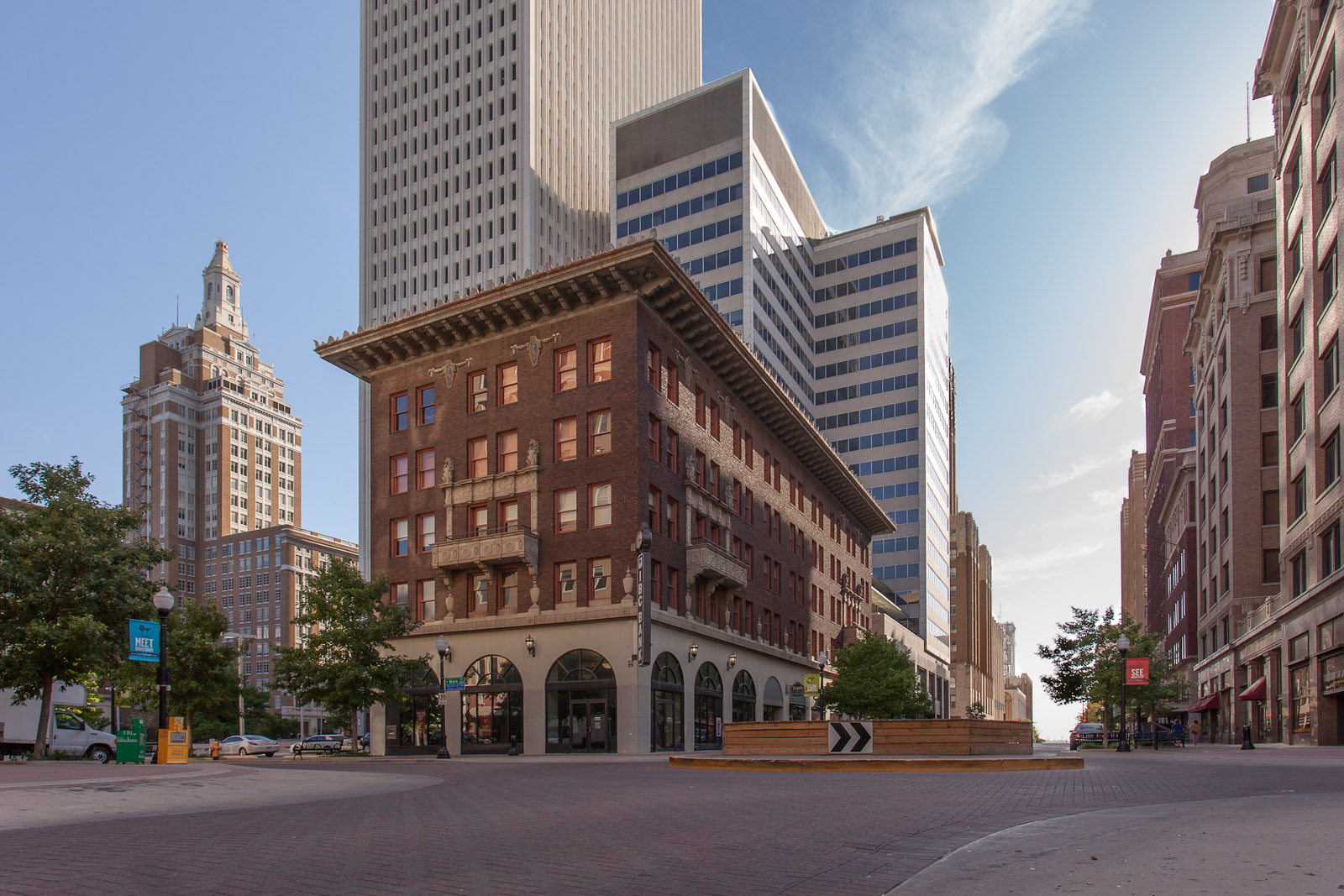
- Oil Capital Historic District in Tulsa, looking East along 5th Street from Main Street intersection
- Location: Tulsa, Oklahoma
- Built: 1910–1967
- Architect: multiple
- Architectural style: multiple
- NRHP reference No.: 10001013
- Added to NRHP: December 13, 2010

The Oil Capital Historic District (OCHD) is an area in downtown Tulsa, Oklahoma that commemorates the success of the oil business in Tulsa during the early 20th century. During this period, Tulsa was widely known as "The Oil Capital of the World." The area is bounded by 3rd Street on the north and 7th Street on the south, Cincinnati Avenue on the east and Cheyenne Avenue on the west.

Early in the 20th century, Oklahoma emerged as a major producer of oil and gas. Many of the companies that would become notable in the energy industry located either their home offices or major regional offices in Downtown Tulsa, often constructing architecturally significant buildings to house them. Supporting companies such as equipment suppliers, banks, insurers, utilities and even hotels quickly followed suit. However, in the late 1960s and early 1970s, when the domestic oil business began to decline and companies began consolidating in other cities, these former office buildings became surplus. Some buildings were converted to other functions, but some others were razed for parking lots or freeways. Tulsans who became concerned about the loss of these historic and cultural landmarks began to work on adapting them for newer and more economic functions. The creation of the Oil Capital Historic District was implemented as a way to slow the losses while the plan was realized.

== Building classifications ==
As part of the application process, all of the significant buildings within the proposed district boundaries were labeled as either "Contributing" or "non-contributing". Buildings in the former category had to meet certain criteria:

- Built between 1910 and 1967
- Involved in some aspect of the oil business during that time
- Had not lost their historical character through remodeling or conversion to other uses

The application states that the district contains 72 resources (69 buildings, 2 sites and one object). These were further classified as 40 contributing, 18 non-contributing and 14 which had previously been listed in the National Register.

The table presented here identifies the buildings contained by the OCHD, as defined in the NRHP application. Data are largely derived from text descriptions in the application. They are listed by street address, beginning in the northeast corner of the district (3rd Street and Cincinnati.Avenue). Several architectural styles are represented in the district: Art Deco, Beaux Arts, Classical Revival, Commercial Style, Greek Revival, Italianate, and Modern Movement. Some buildings do not conform to any particular style.

Notable buildings in Oil Capital Historic District
Name	Address	Year Built	Architectural Style	Notes
Parker Building	8 East 3rd	1929	Gothic Revival	Non-Contributing
24 East 3rd Building	24 East 3rd	1953	Modern Movement	Contributing
Wright Building	115 West 3rd	1922	Classical Revival	Contributing
Castle Building	116 West 3rd	1925	Classical Revival	Contributing
Tulsa Federal Employees Credit Union Building	120 West 3rd	1971	Modern Movement	Non-Contributing
Wright Building Annex	115 West 3rd	1916	Commercial Style	Contributing
Reunion Building	9 East 4th	1919	Classical Revival	Contributing
Mid-Continent Parking Garage	117 East 4th	1955	No distinctive style	Non-Contributing
Tulsa Municipal Building	124 East 4th	1917	Greek Revival	Contributing; previously listed as NRIS #75001574
Tulsa World Building	23 West 4th	1917	Greek Revival	Contributing
Tulsa World Annex	23 West 4th	1970	Classic Revival	Non-Contributing
Irving Building	110 West 4th	1925	Art Deco	Contributing
Downtowner Motel	121 West 4th	1961	Modern Movement	Contributing
Sinclair Building	6 East 5th Street	1917	Beaux Arts	Contributing
McFarlin Building	9 East 5th Street	1918	Italianate	Contributing; previously listed as NRIS #79002030
First National Tower/Chase Bank	15 East 5th Street	1949	Modern Movement	Contributing
Vandever Building	16 East 5th Street	1920	Classical Revival	Contributing
Thompson Building	20 East 5th Street	1924	Classical Revival	Contributing
University Club Building	114 East 5th Street	1924	Classical Revival	Contributing
Tulsa Club Building	115 East 5th Street	1927	Art Deco	Contributing
Mayo Building	5 West 5th Street (Note: Address shown as listed in OCHD application, but current address is 420 South Main Street)	1915	Classical Revival	Contributing; previously listed as NRIS #08001152
Gillette-Tyrrell Building (a.k.a. Pythian Building	19 West 5th Street (Note: Address shown as listed in OCHD application, but current address is 423 South Boulder Avenue)	1930	Art Deco:Zigzag	Contributing; previously listed as NRIS #82003703
Petroleum Building	111 West 5th Street (Note: Address shown as listed in OCHD application, but current address is 420 South Boulder Avenue)	1921	Classical Revival	Contributing; previously listed as NRIS #82003706
Mayo Hotel	115 West 5th Street	1925	Classical Revival	Contributing; previously listed as NRIS #80003303
Service Pipeline Building	119 East 6th Street	1949	Art Deco/Streamline Zigzag	Contributing
Public Service Co. of Oklahoma Building	2 West 6th Street	1929	Art Deco: Zigzag	Contributing; previously listed as NRIS #84003443
Fourth National Bank Building	15 West 6th Street	1967	Modern Movement	Contributing Now renamed Bank of America Center
Holiday Inn/Downtown Plaza	17 West 7th	1965	Modern Movement	Contributing
320 South Boston Building/ Exchange National Bank/ National Bank of Tulsa	320 South Boston Avenue	1917 & 1928	Beaux Arts	Contributing
Kennedy Building	321 South Boston Avenue	1918	Beaux Arts	Contributing
400 South Boston Avenue	400 South Boston Avenue	1967	Modern Movement	Contributing
Cosden Building/Mid-Continent Tower Building	409 South Boston Avenue	1918 & 1984	Gothic Revival	Contributing; previously listed as NRIS #792002029
410 South Boston Avenue Building	15 East 5th Street	1974	Modern Movement	Non-Contributing
Atlas Life Building	415 South Boston Avenue	1922	Classical Revival	Contributing; previously listed as NRIS #09000358
Philtower Building	427 South Boston Avenue	1927	Classical Revival	Contributing; previously listed as NRIS #79002032
Philcade Building	501 South Boston Avenue	1930	Art Deco: Zigzag	Contributing; previously listed as NRIS #86002196
Day Building	514 South Boston Avenue	1925	Commercial Style	Contributing
Fawcett Building	515 South Boston Avenue	1934	Art Deco: PWA	Contributing
Pan American South Building	519 South Boston Avenue	1967	Modern Movement	Contributing
522 South Boston Avenue Building	522 South Boston Avenue	1954	Modern Movement	Non-Contributing
601 South Boston Avenue	Parking Garage	1954	No distinctive style	Contributing
616 South Boston Avenue Building	616 South Boston Avenue	1951	Moderne	Contributing
Oklahoma Natural Gas Company Building	624 South Boston Avenue	1928	Art Deco: PWA	Contributing; previously listed as NRIS #84003458
Ponca City Savings and Loan Building	633 South Boston Avenue	1956	Modern Movement	Contributing
Masonic Temple	706 South Boston Avenue	1923	Beaux Arts	Contributing
First Presbyterian Church	709 South Boston	1926 & 1953	Gothic Revival	Contributing
United States Post Office and Courthouse	224 South Boulder Avenue	1917 & 1934	Classical Revival	Contributing; previously listed as NRIS #00000244
320 South Boulder Avenue Building	320 South Boulder Avenue	1917	No distinctive style	Non-Contributing
Beacon Building	406 South Boulder Avenue	1923	Beaux Arts	Contributing
Petroleum Club	601 South Boulder Avenue	1965	Modern Movement	Contributing
Mid-Co Building	302 South Cheyenne Avenue	1918	Beaux Arts	Contributing
Mincks-Adams Hotel	403 South Cheyenne Avenue	1928	Mixed Style	Contributing; previously listed as NRIS #78002273
308 South Cincinnati Avenue	308 South Cincinnati Avenue Building	1919	No distinctive style	Non-Contributing
414 South Cincinnati Avenue Building	414 South Cincinnati Avenue	1965	No distinctive style	Contributing
University of Tulsa Law School	512 South Cincinnati Avenue	1949	Art Deco: Streamline/Zigzag	Contributing
610 South Cincinnati Avenue	610 South Cincinnati Avenue Building	1959	Modern Movement	Contributing;
309 South Main Street Building	309 South Main Street	1930	No distinctive style	Non-Contributing
Renberg Building	311 South Main Street	1947	Modern Movement	Contributing
312 South Main Street Building	312 South Main Street	1970	Modern Movement	Non-Contributing
Drexel Building	317 South Main Street	1910 renovated c. 1950	No distinctive style	Contributing
Palace Building	324 South Main Street	1913	Art Deco: Zigzag	Contributing
Parking Garage	402 South Main Street	1975	No distinctive style	Non-Contributing
502 South Main Street Building	502 South Main Street	1981	Modern Movement	Non-Contributing
Ketchum Hotel/Oil Capital Building	507 South Main Street	1915, renovated in 1947	Commercial Style	Contributing
515 South Main Street Building	515 South Main Street	1986	Modern Movement	Non-Contributing
525 South Main Street Building (Park Centre Building)	525 South Main Street	1973	Modern Movement	Non-Contributing
610 South Main Street Building	610 South Main Street	1929	Beaux Arts	Contributing
616 South Main Street Building	616 South Main Street	1929	Beaux Arts	Contributing

== Oil Industry decline ==
The importance of Tulsa in the oil industry, as well as the impact of the oil industry on Tulsa, declined as the United States began to rely more heavily on cheaper offshore and imported oil. Major international companies downsized or eliminated their Tulsa offices and moved to cities nearer the coasts, especially after foreign countries began exerting more control over their own oil resources. The Arab Oil Embargo accelerated the trend. The International Petroleum Exposition, which had drawn a record number of visitors in 1966, faded in importance and occurred less frequently until it was permanently cancelled after the 1979 show.

== District buildings demolished 1967-2010 ==
Notable buildings in or very near the OCHD that were demolished during the decline of the oil business and the creation of the district include:

- Bethlehem Steel Building, 2nd and Boston, razed in 1970
- Bliss Hotel 2nd & Boston, Built in 1929 and razed in February 1973.
- Hunt Building, 4th and Main, better known as the Brown-Dunkin Department Store, demolished in 1970.
- Medical Arts Building, 6th and Boulder, demolished in July 1970.
- Hotel Tulsa, 3rd and Cincinnati. Demolished 1972.
- Skelly Building, 23 West 4th, A 9-story office of the Skelly Oil companies, demolished 2004.
- Orpheum Theater, 12 East 4th Street, opened in 1917 as a vaudeville theater, then switched to movies in 1931. Closed in March 1970 and was demolished in May 1970. It was replaced by the Tulsa Building & Loan Building at 10-12 East 4th.(originally the Edwards Building, built in 1926.)

== Current status of selected surviving buildings ==
=== First Place Tower ===
This building was completed in 1973 and previously housed, in succession, the First National Bank of Tulsa and a Citicorp branch. Citicorp vacated the premises in 2012. ONE Gas, Inc. planned to move its headquarters to this building in 2014.

=== Sinclair Building ===
According to a Tulsa World article, a Tulsa County District Judge ruled that the City of Tulsa and the Central Park Owners Association Inc. could foreclose on the Sinclair Building because the current owner was in arrears on $270,000 for taxes, fees and penalties. The sale could be sold at a sheriff's auction, after a 30-day appeal period, unless the owner reaches a settlement agreement with the city and other creditors.

=== Tulsa Club Building ===
The Tulsa Club was founded in 1925 as a social club for wealthy businessmen. The 11-story building, designed by Bruce Goff, was constructed in 1927 on the northwest corner of Fifth Street and Cincinnati Avenue, next to the Philtower Building. The Tulsa Chamber of Commerce owned 40 percent of the building and the club owned 60 percent. The Chamber of Commerce and other organizations used the lower five floors, while the Tulsa Club occupied the top six and a roof garden. The chamber sold its interest to the club in 1952, when it built a new building at 616 South Boston. The club abandoned the building in 1994.

It is unclear when California investor C. J. Morony acquired the building. It is even less clear why. Space was never rented, but the building was allowed to deteriorate. Squatters moved and several fires were deliberately set inside. The city tried for seven years to get him to correct code violations, pay delinquent taxes and fees.

Bruce Garrett bought the building for $400,000 in April 2013 at a sheriff's sale, and announced plans to renovate it, while preserving the early 20th-century design.

A recent news article recounted that vandals took away door knobs, light fixtures, and practically anything else they could pry loose. They also covered the walls with graffiti. Fires were set three times in two weeks during April, 2010, damaging several rooms and disfiguring the exterior walls with scorch marks. In October, 2010, a more serious fire raged through the ballroom on the ninth floor, creating doubts that the building could be saved.

Although most developers that had been interested in saving the building lost interest, a Tulsa construction company, the Ross Group, bought the structure in 2015 for $1.5 million. Promise Hotels, became an equity partner. These partners felt they could restore the building to usable condition for $24 million. By 2018, they realized the cost would be $33 million. After the hotel reopened in mid-June 2019, Pete Patel, CEO and President of Promise Hotels, told the Tulsa World that the final cost was about $36 million. He also added, “the most expensive hotel in Tulsa, if not in Oklahoma.”

=== 633 South Boston Building ===
This building was designed by architect Robert Buchner to house the Tulsa office of Ponca City Savings and Loan Company, but has remained vacant for a number of years. The Tulsa Foundation for Architecture relocated to building renaming it the Tulsa Center for Architecture and Design with a current intent on acquiring the building with a right of first refusal and rent credit in place towards the purchase.

=== 8 East 3rd Street Building ===
The 10-story building at 8 East 3rd Street has been named as the Holarud Building, the McBirney Building and the Parker Building. It was constructed in 1929 as the headquarters for Parker Drilling Company, and was known as the Parker Building. The company extensively remodeled it in 1975, then sold it and relocated to Houston in 2001. Apparently the building remained vacant until Parker Drilling Company reacquired it in 2012, as a result of foreclosure. The company then sold the building to the Anish Hotel Group, who announced that the building will be converted into a hotel. Since the recent sale, it has been renamed as the 8 East 3rd Street Building.

As of March 2014, the 3rd Street Building project was on hold. Because a large number of hotel projects were being considered for Downtown Tulsa, some concern have arisen about whether there would be sufficient demand for all these to survive. In an interview, Anish Hotel Group founder, Andy Patel, said that the company is also thinking about converting the former Parker Building to residences or office spaces.

=== Palace Building ===
Also known as the Excaliber Building and the 324 South Main Building, the structure was reportedly owned by the Tulsa World in 2012. For several years, it had been vacant, except for an Arby's restaurant on the ground floor. Rumors that the building would be demolished were denied by the newspaper.

=== Petroleum Club Building ===
The Petroleum Club Building at 601 South Boulder in Tulsa got its name from the private club that moved into its top three floors when it was built in 1963. The building is 196 feet (60 m) tall, has 16 stories, and contains 118,000 square feet (11,000 m^{2}) of floor space. In 1994, a major fire heavily damaged the top two stories, forcing the club to close, and causing serious smoke damage throughout the rest of the building. The club facilities were rebuilt and the facility remained open until 2011. The decline of the oil business in Tulsa was accompanied by a loss of members in the club, and contributed to heavy financial losses. The club closed in July 2011. However, the building is still referred to locally as the Petroleum Club Building.

Tulsa-based Consumer Affairs reportedly has remodeled the severely damaged top floors and has moved some of its headquarters staff into the new space, according to a brief announcement. A previous article noted that Consumer Affairs is a web-based consumer activist organization that was based in Lake Tahoe, Nevada, before moving to Tulsa in 2010. It had announced when beginning the remodel project that it was considering leasing an additional six floors of the building.

== Gallery ==
=== Street views ===
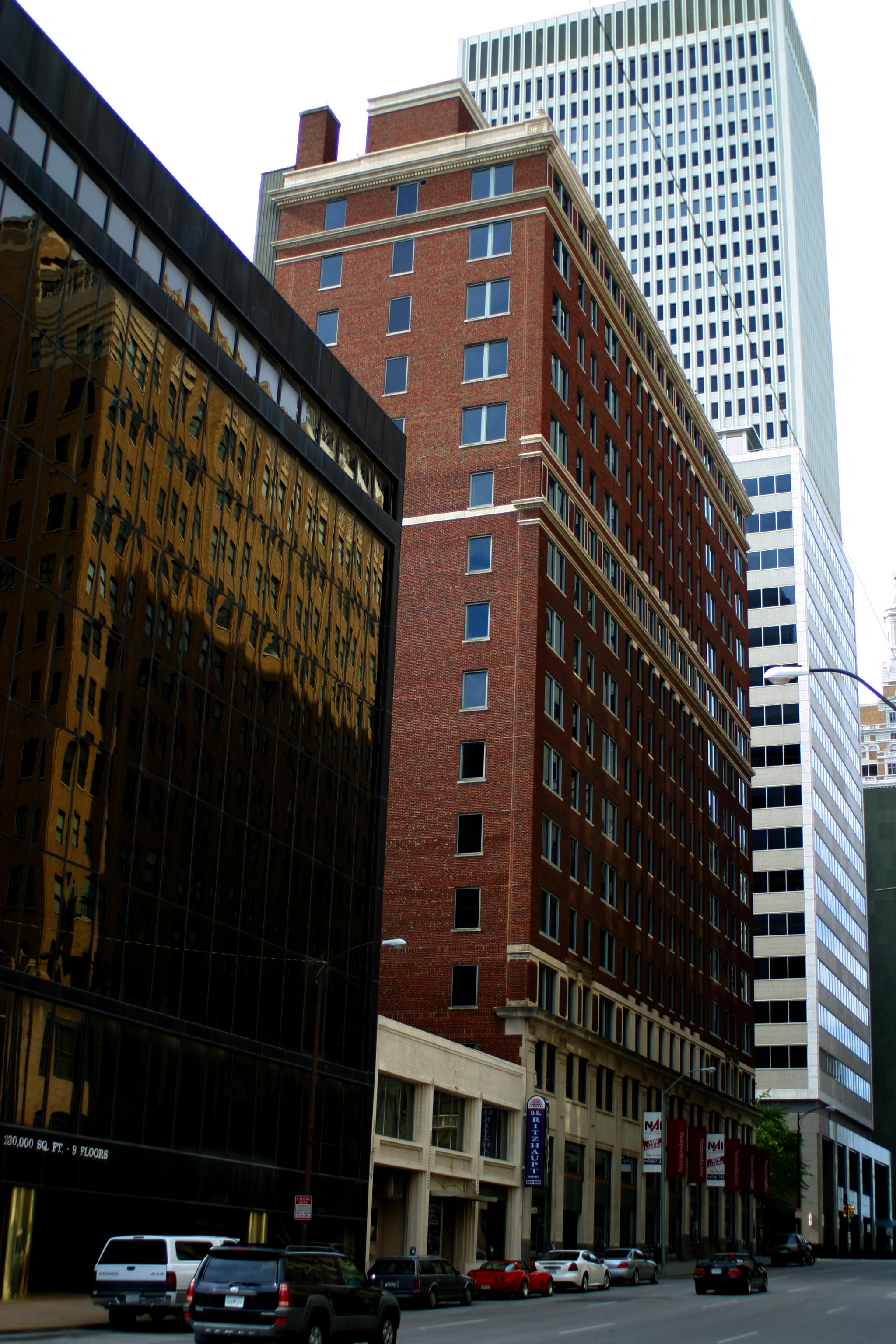
Looking north on Boston Avenue from 6th Street intersection

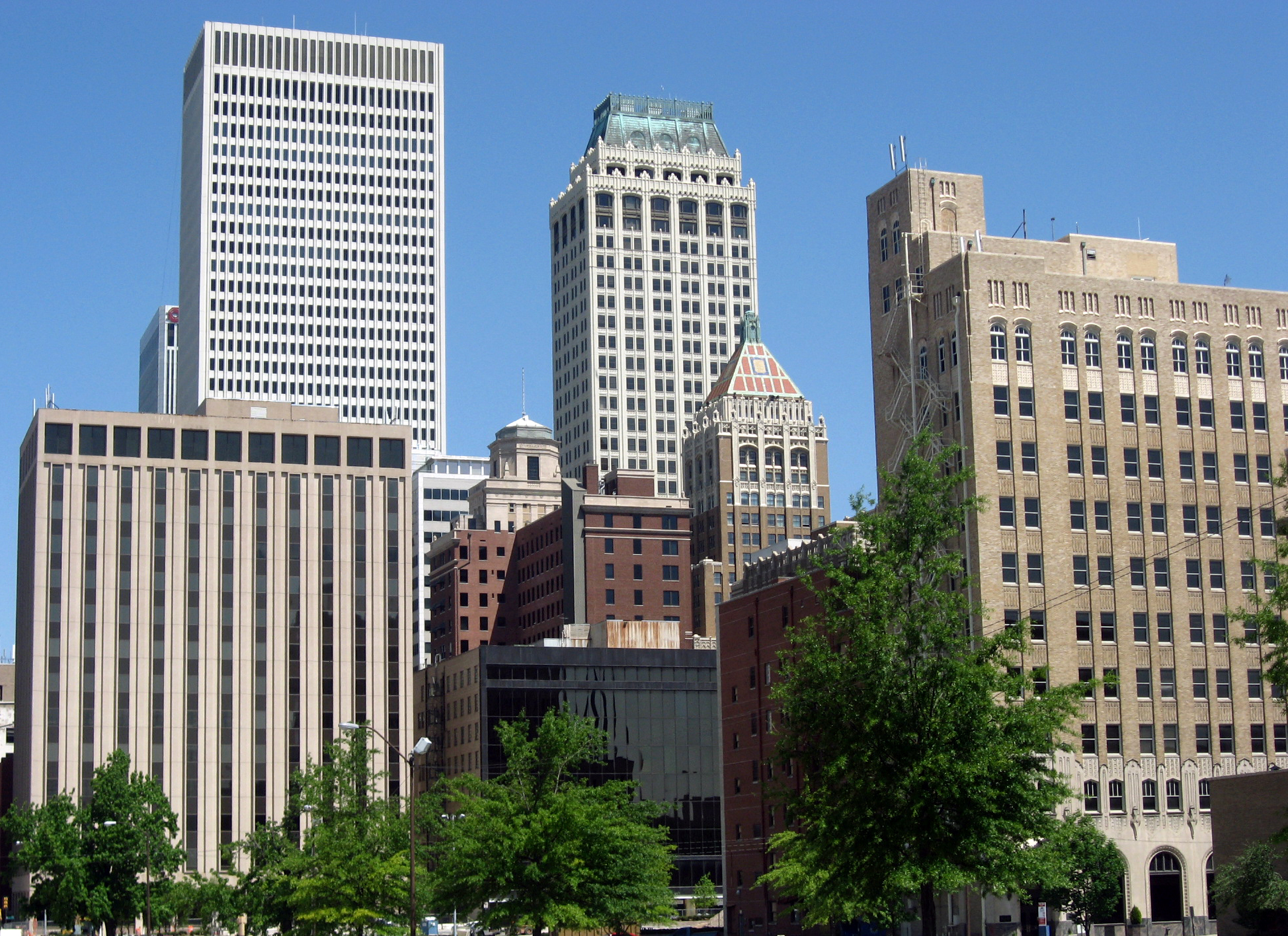
Looking north east between Main Street (left) and Boston Avenue (right). Philtower is right of center; Thompson Building is left of center; Mid-continent Building is behind the Philtower. Photo in 2008 by Caleb Long.

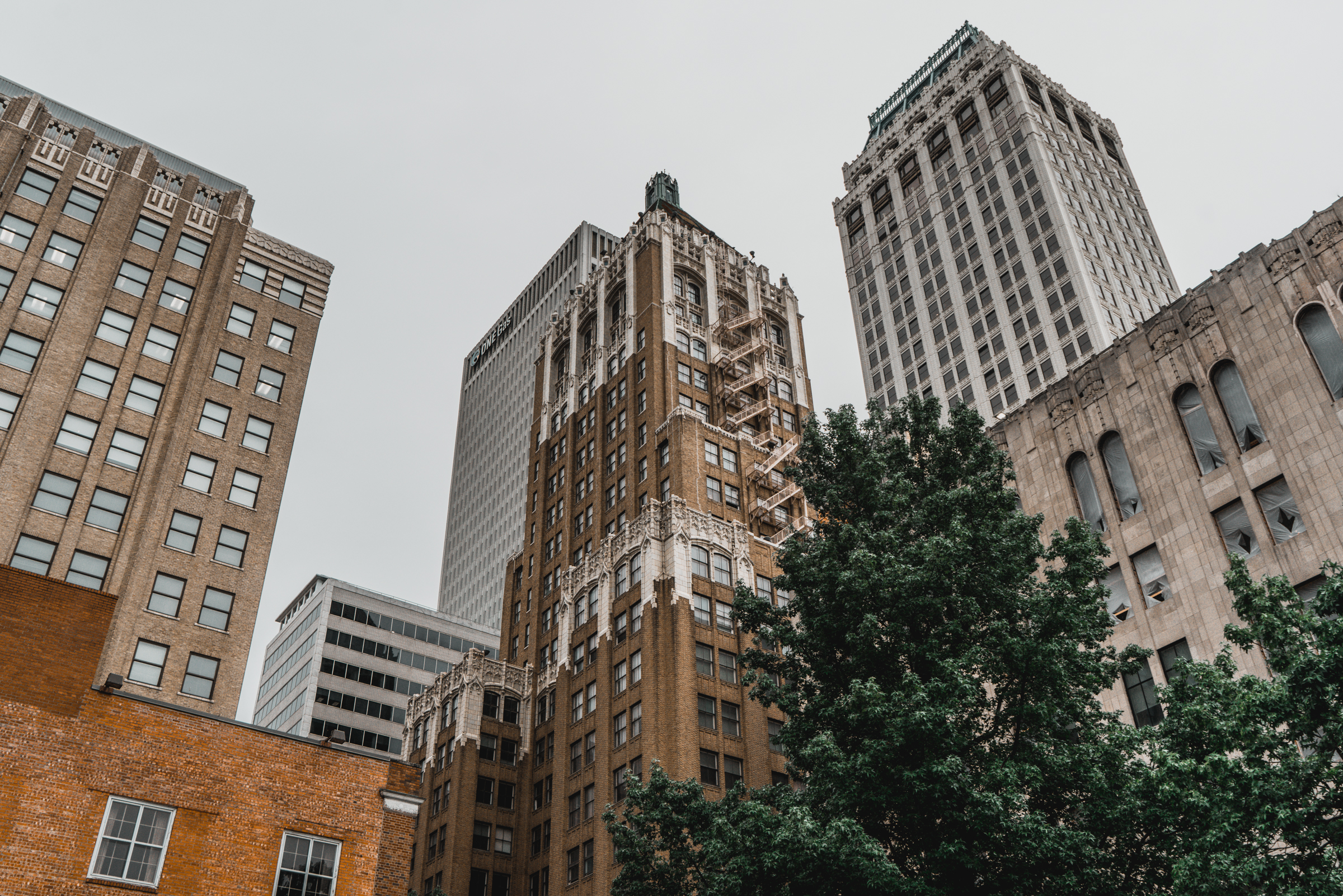
Several buildings in downtown Tulsa, Oklahoma. Philtower: Orange top, brick building in the center foreground; Mid-Continent Tower: to the right of Philtower with the greenish roof; First Place Tower: to the left of Philtower.

=== Contributing buildings ===
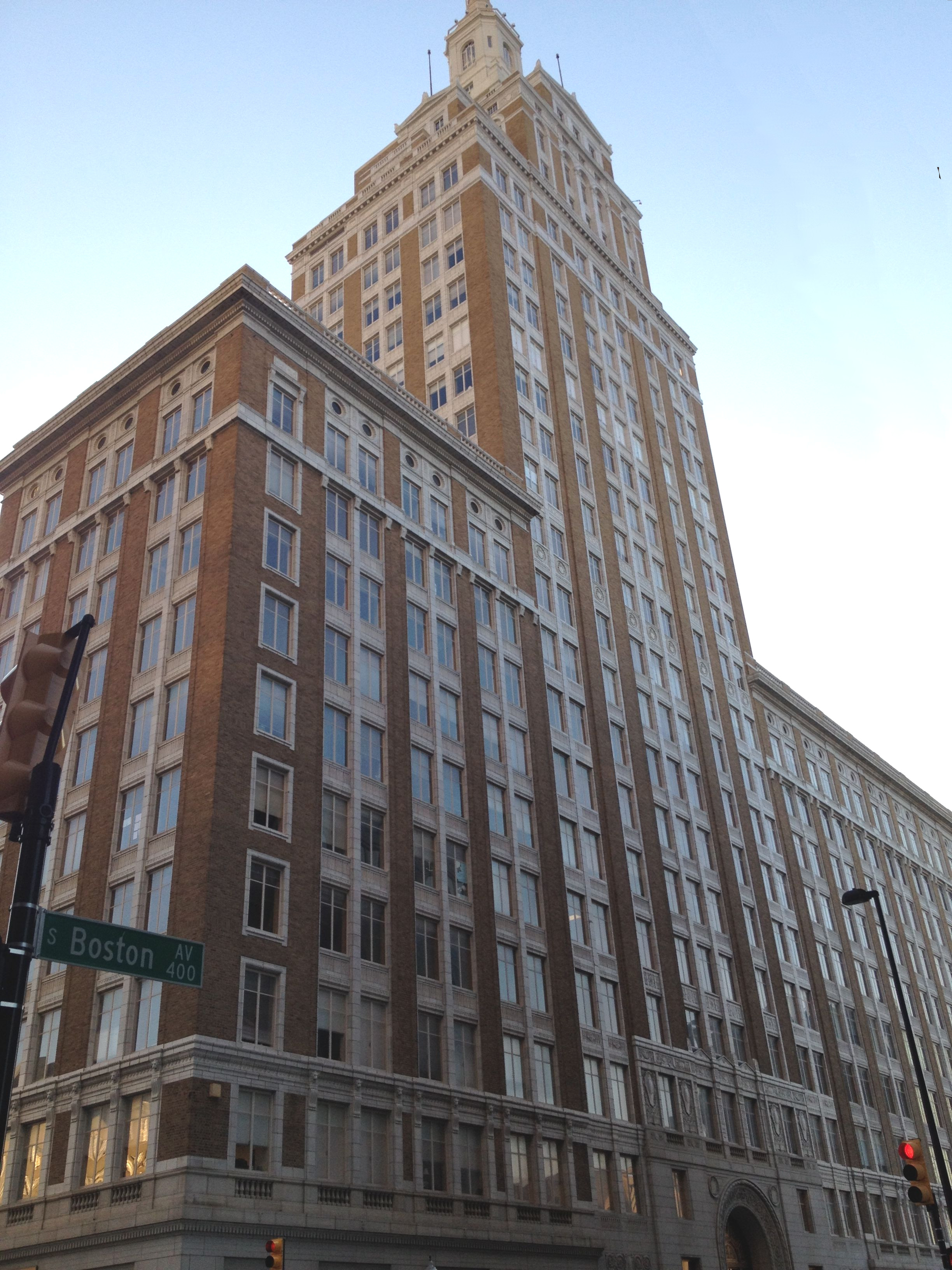
320 S Boston Building, formerly National Bank of Tulsa, is now a general office building

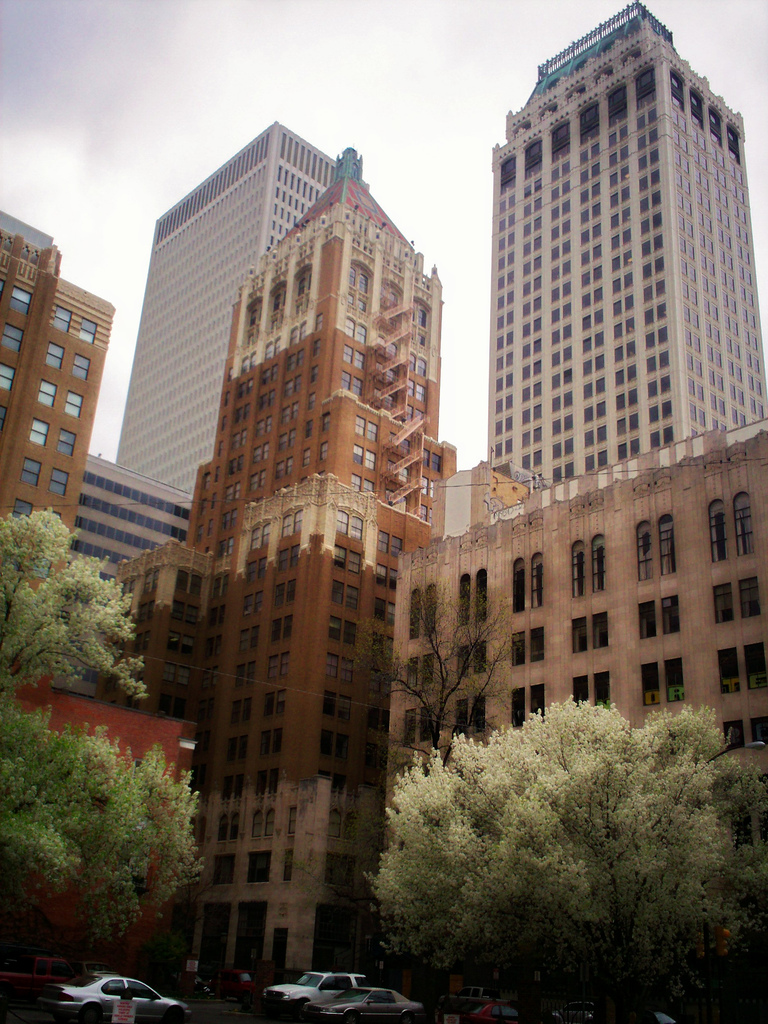
Philtower Building has been converted to a mixed office and residential building

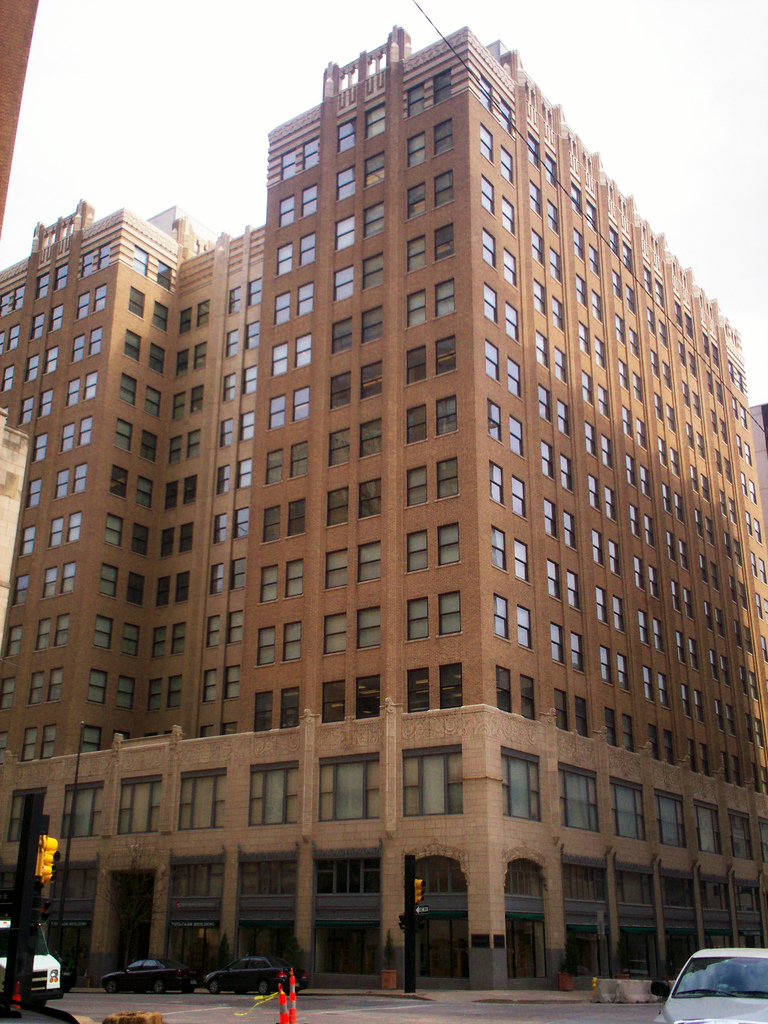
515 South Boston Building
formerly known as Philtower, Amoco and Stanolind Buildings

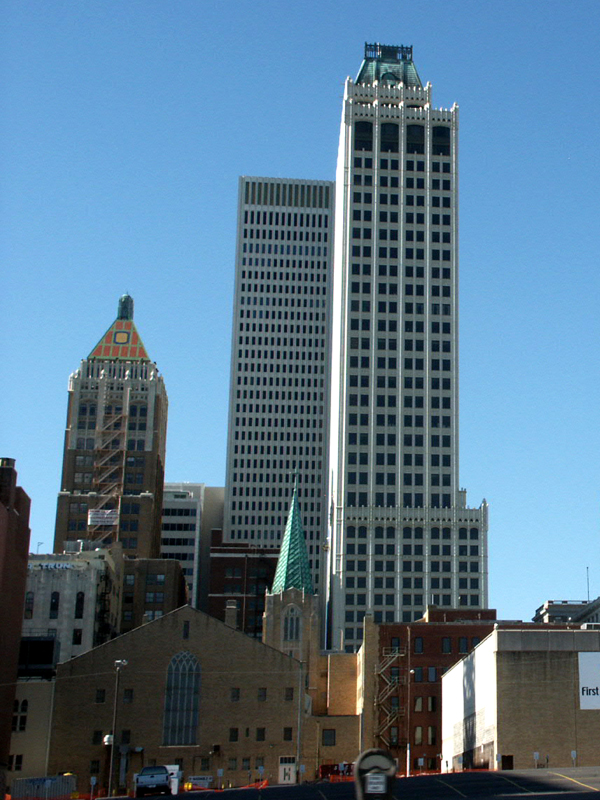
401 South Boston
original 20-story building expanded in 1984 to present height

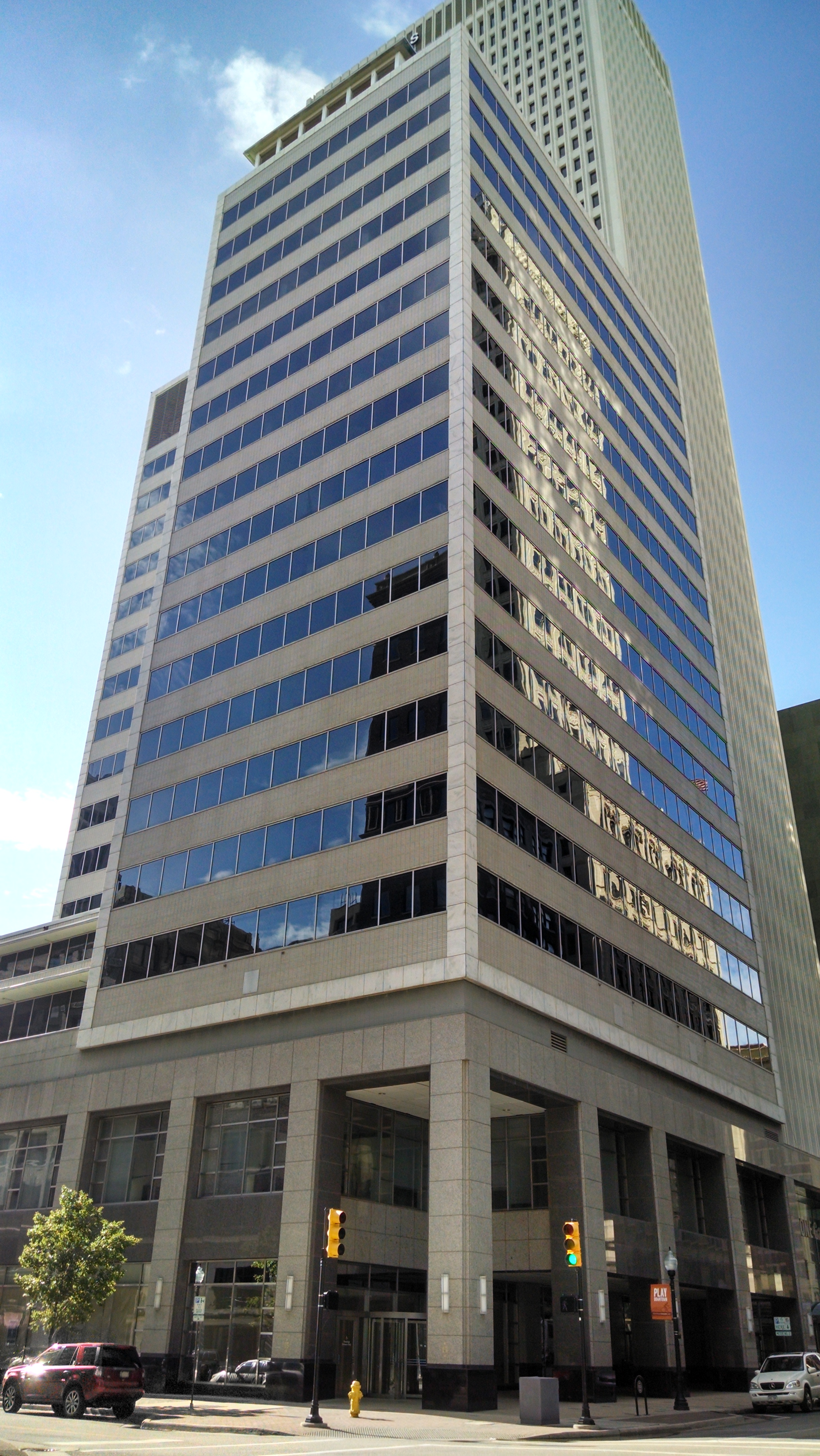
First National Bank, 5th Street & Boston Avenue

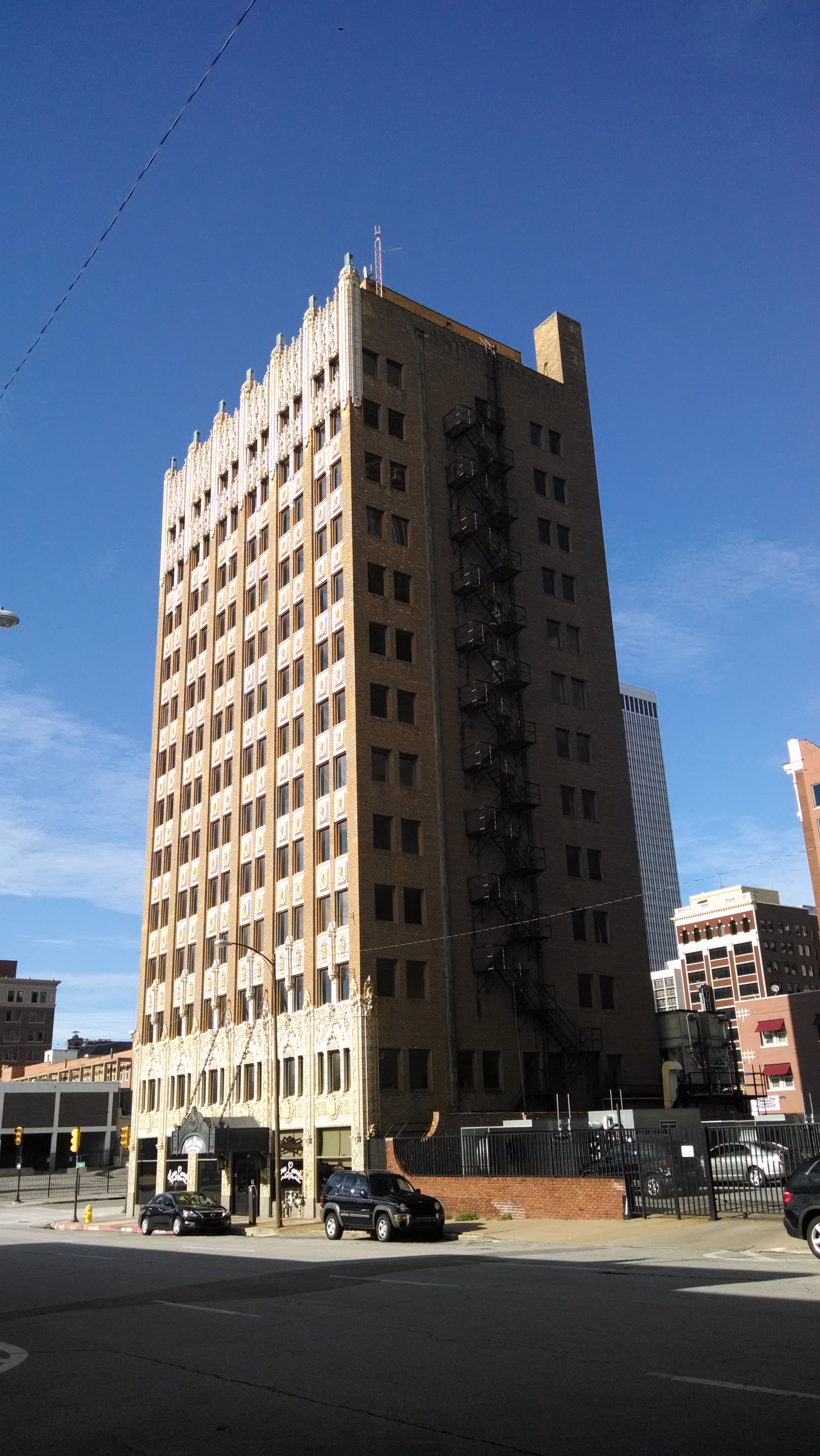
Mincks-Adams Hotel (later known as Adams Hotel)
403 South Cheyenne Avenue

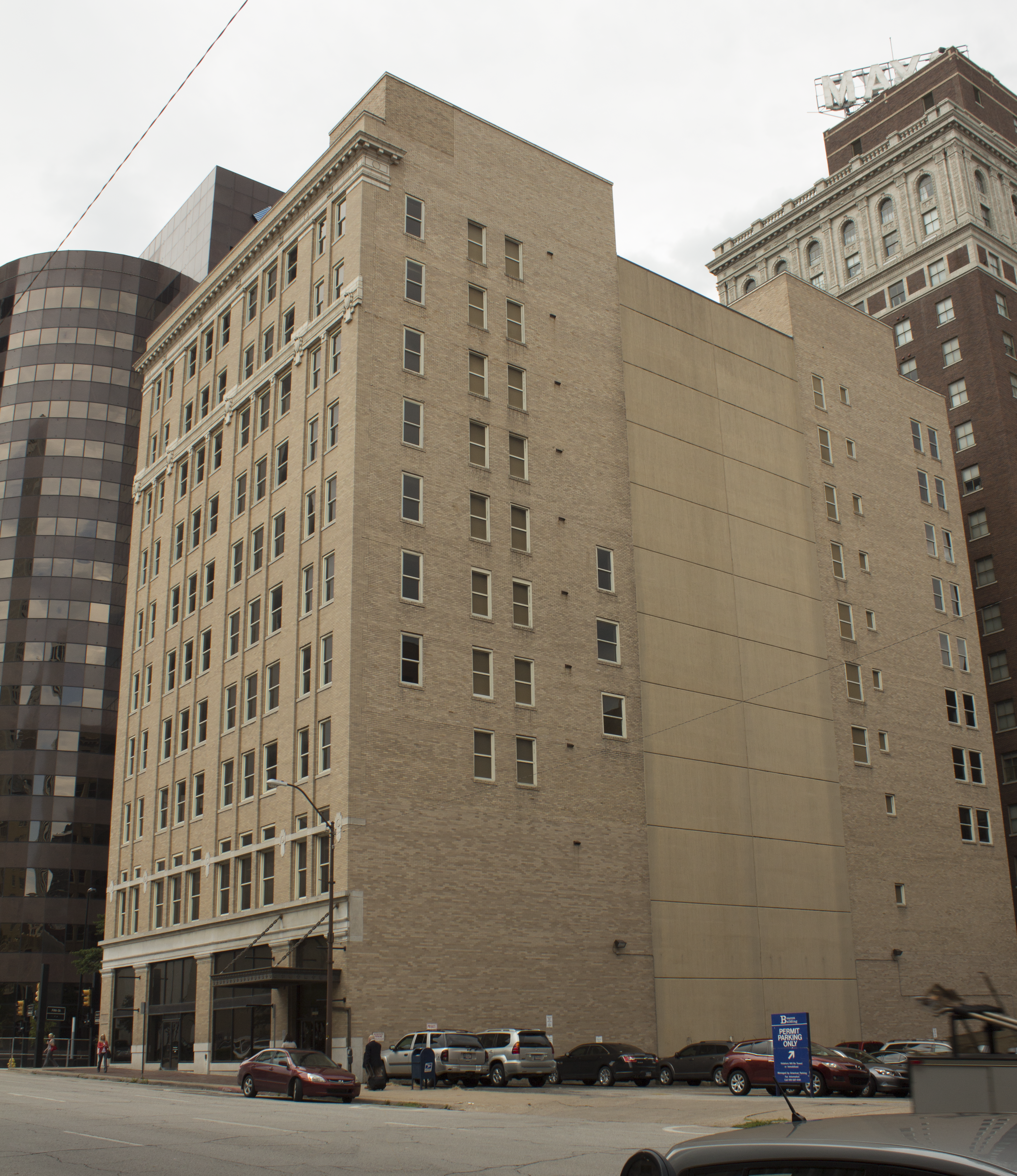
Petroleum Building
111 West 5th Street

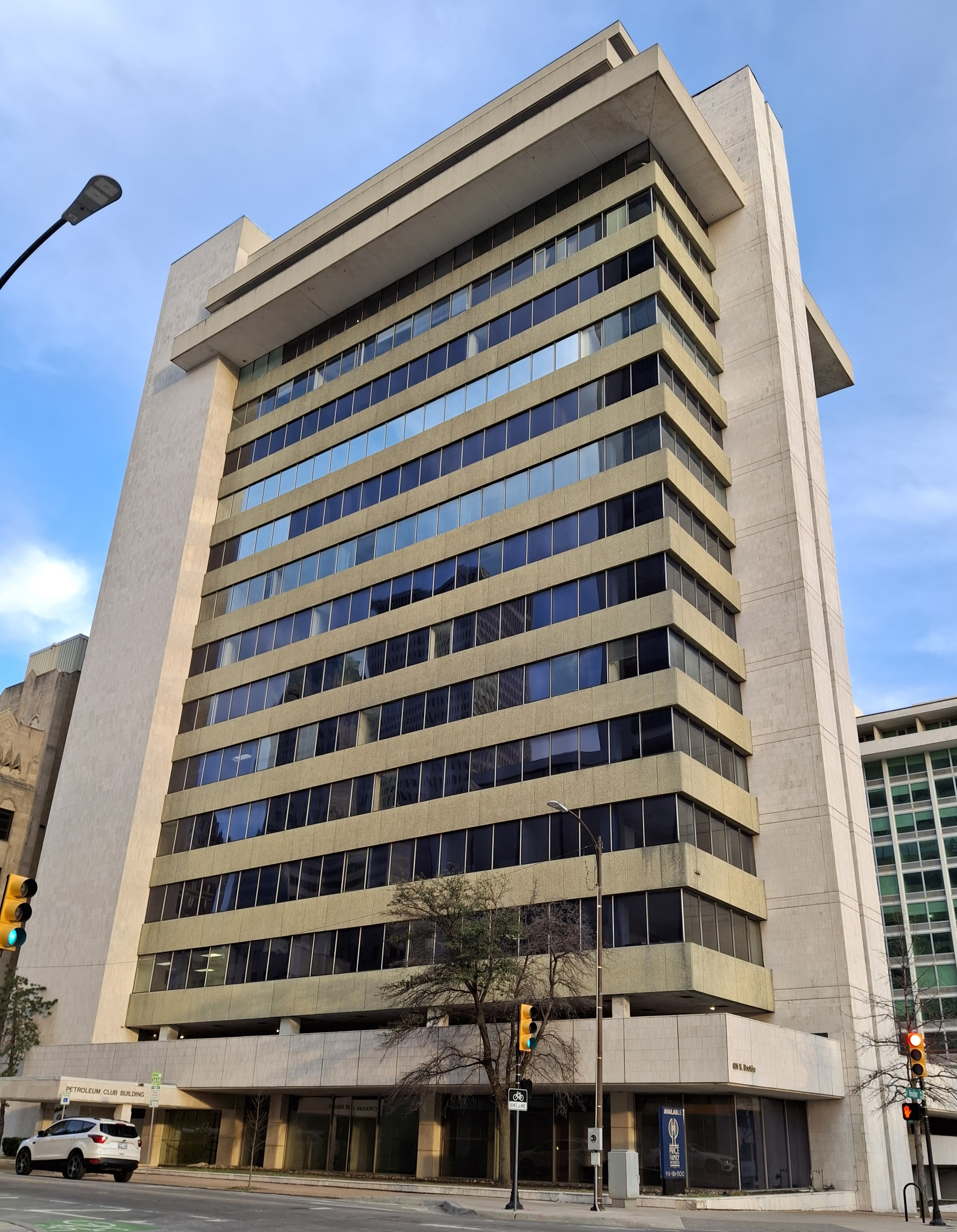
Petroleum Club Building

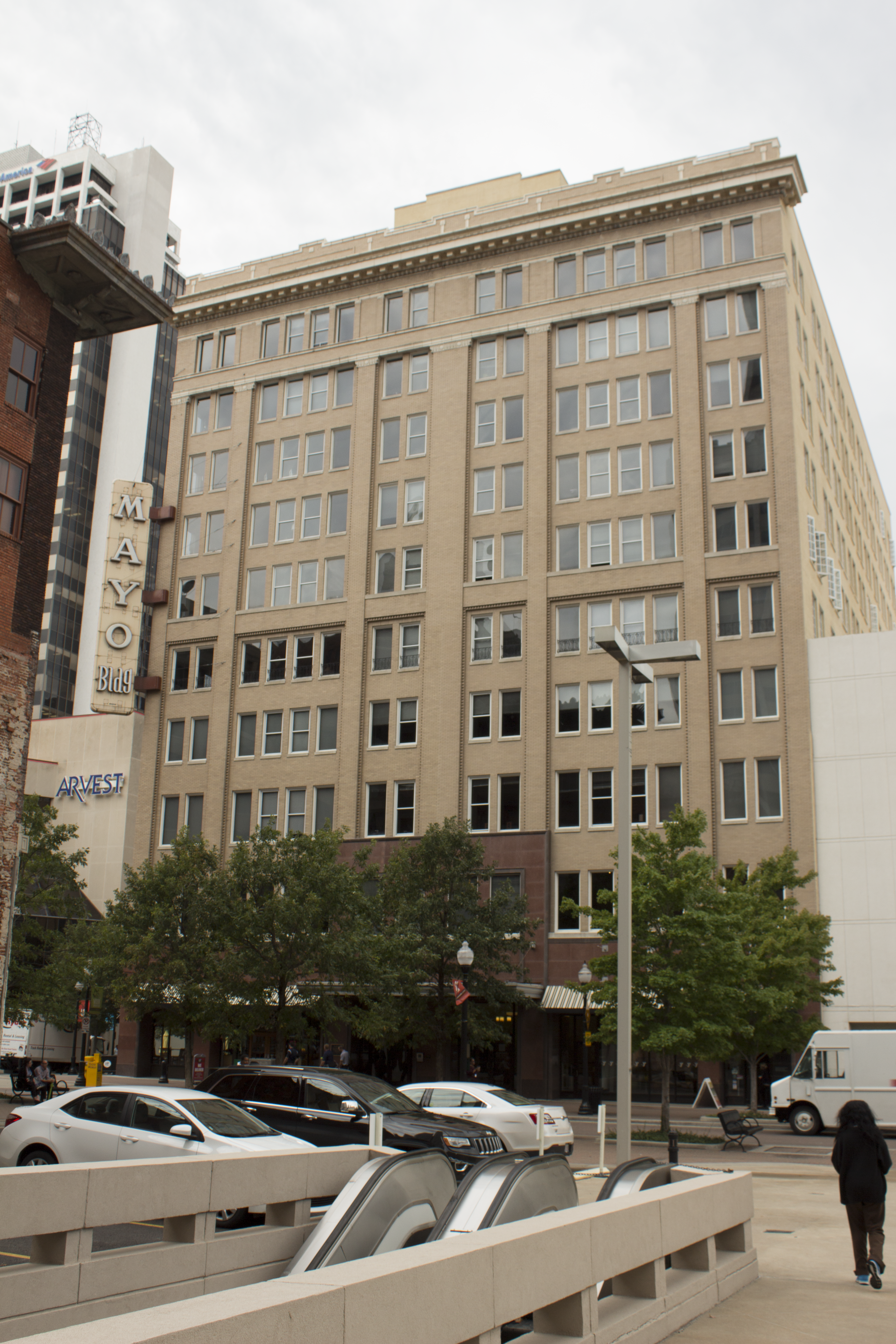
Mayo Building
420 S. Main

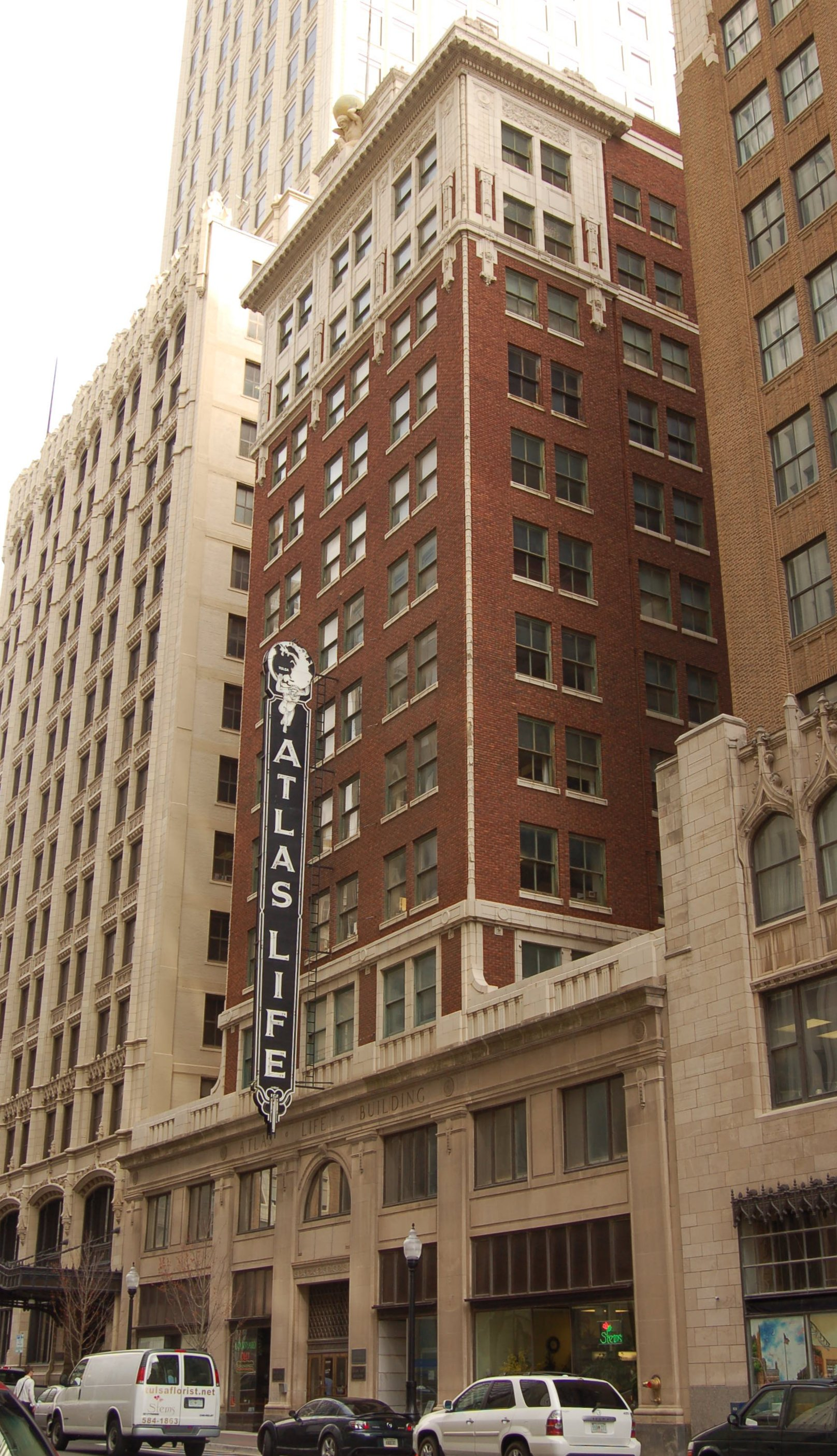
Former Atlas Life Building (since converted to a hotel)

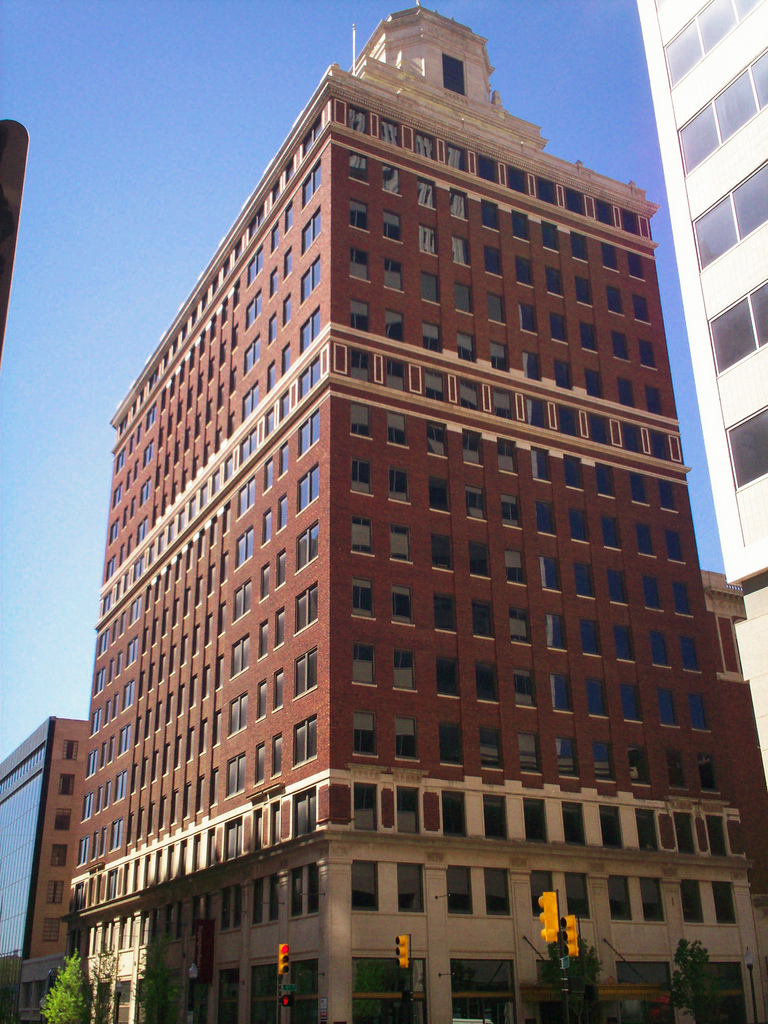
Thompson Building

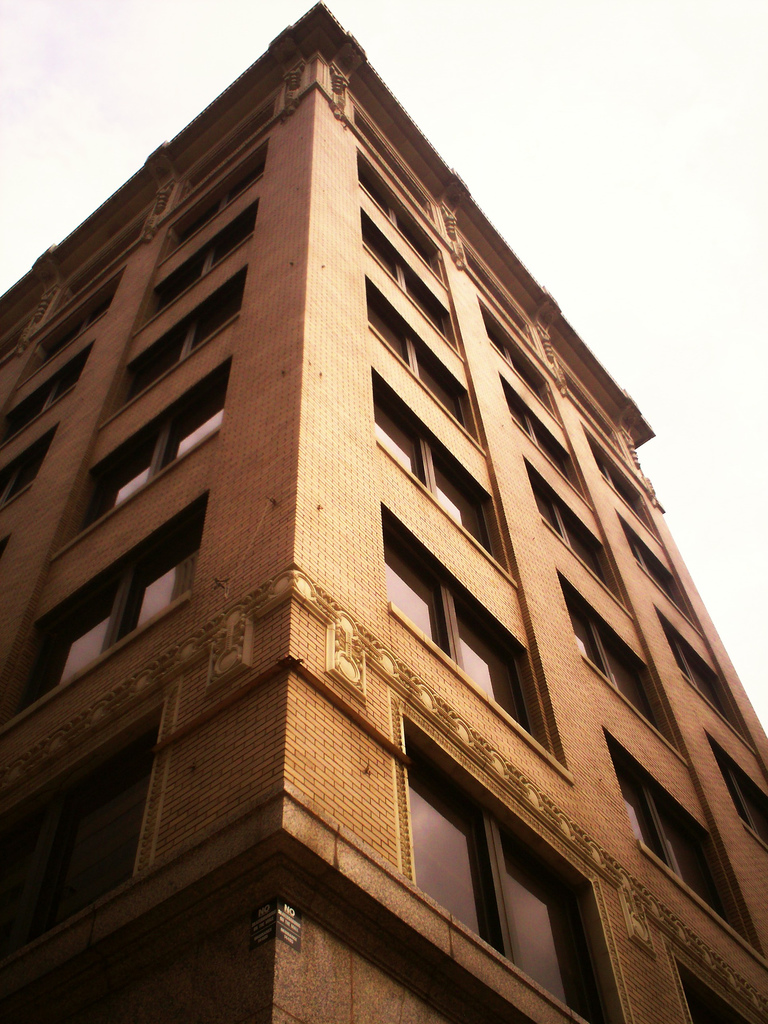
Sinclair Building
6 East 5th Street

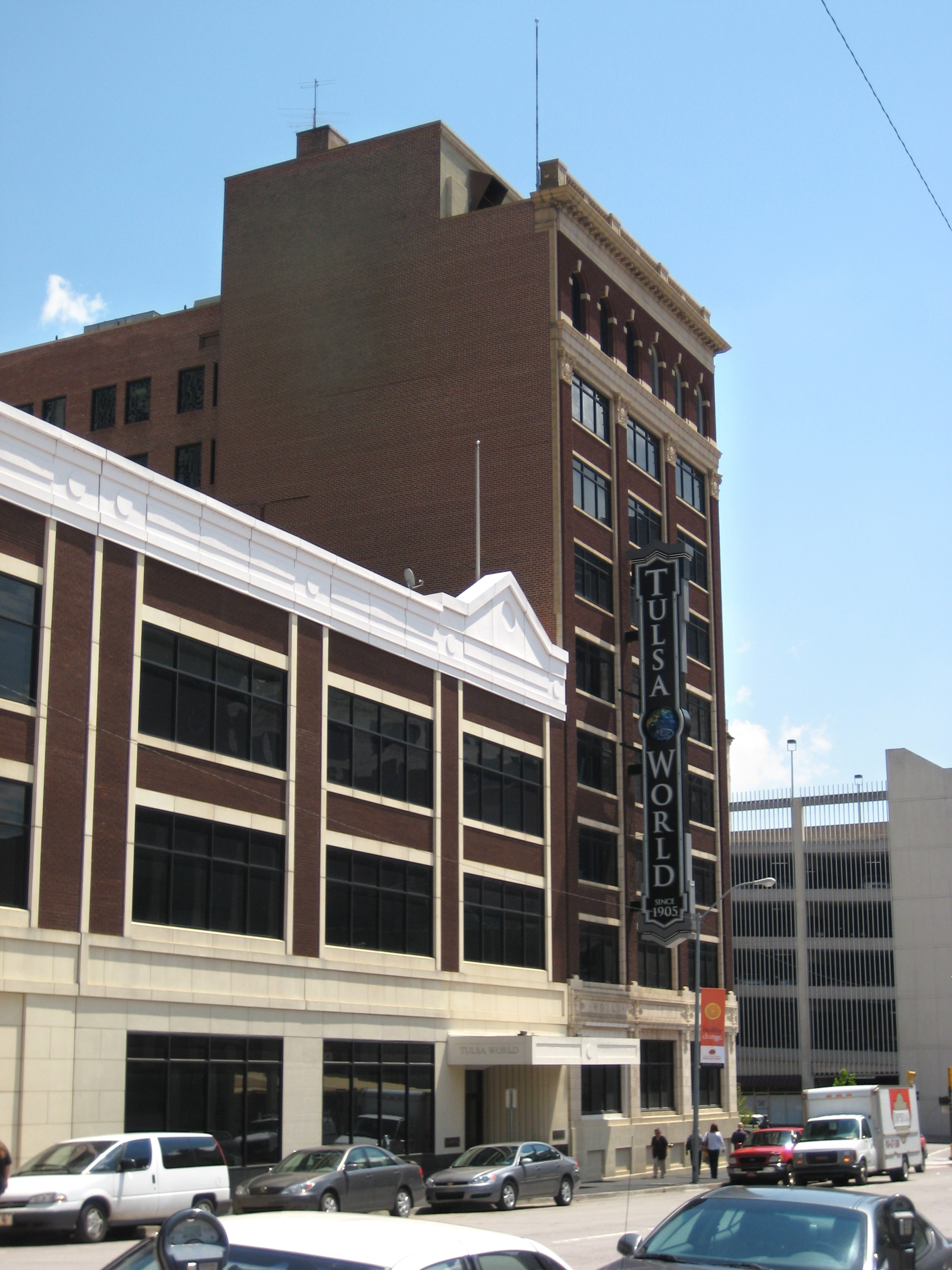
Tulsa World Building

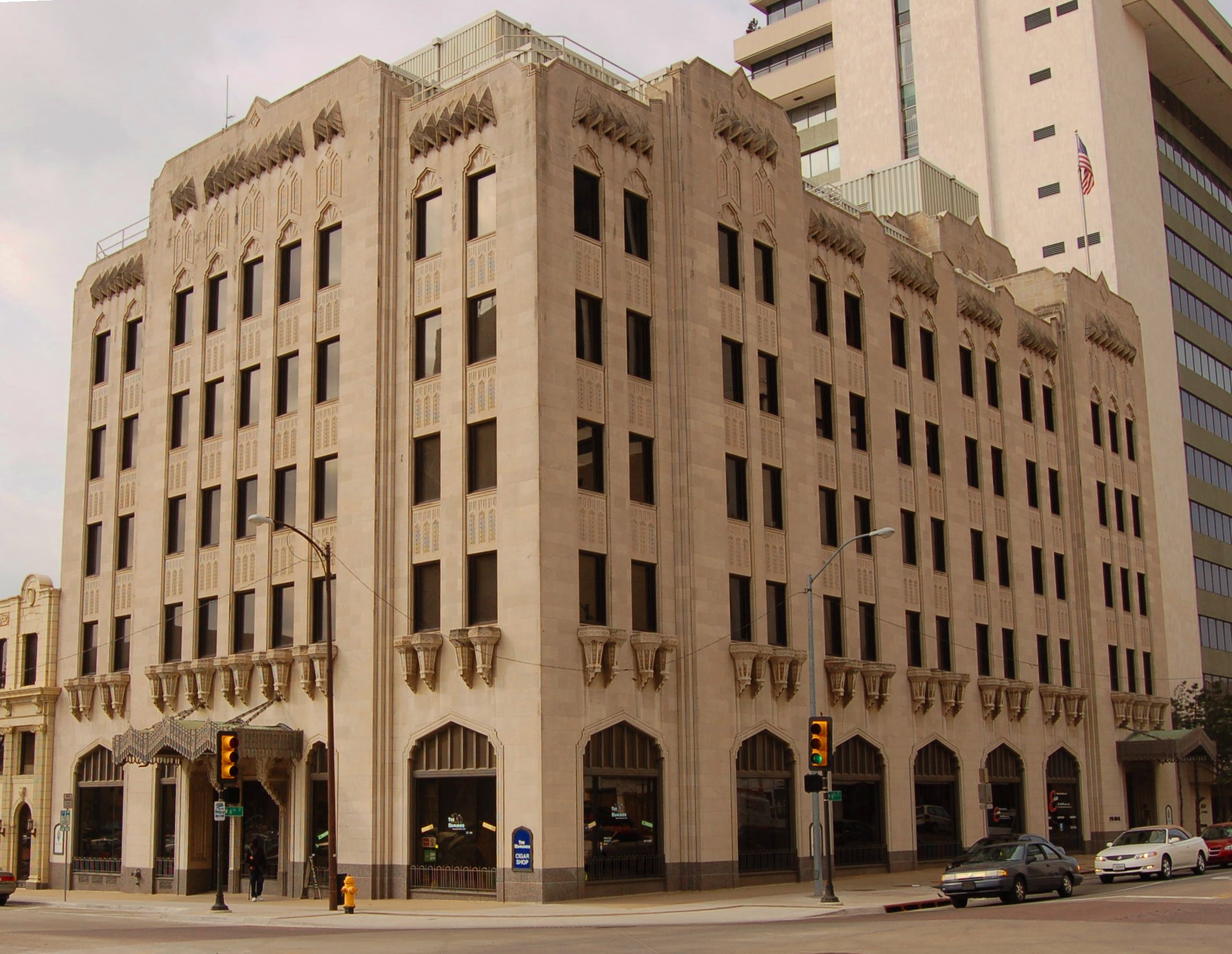
Public Service of Oklahoma Building
2 West 6th Street

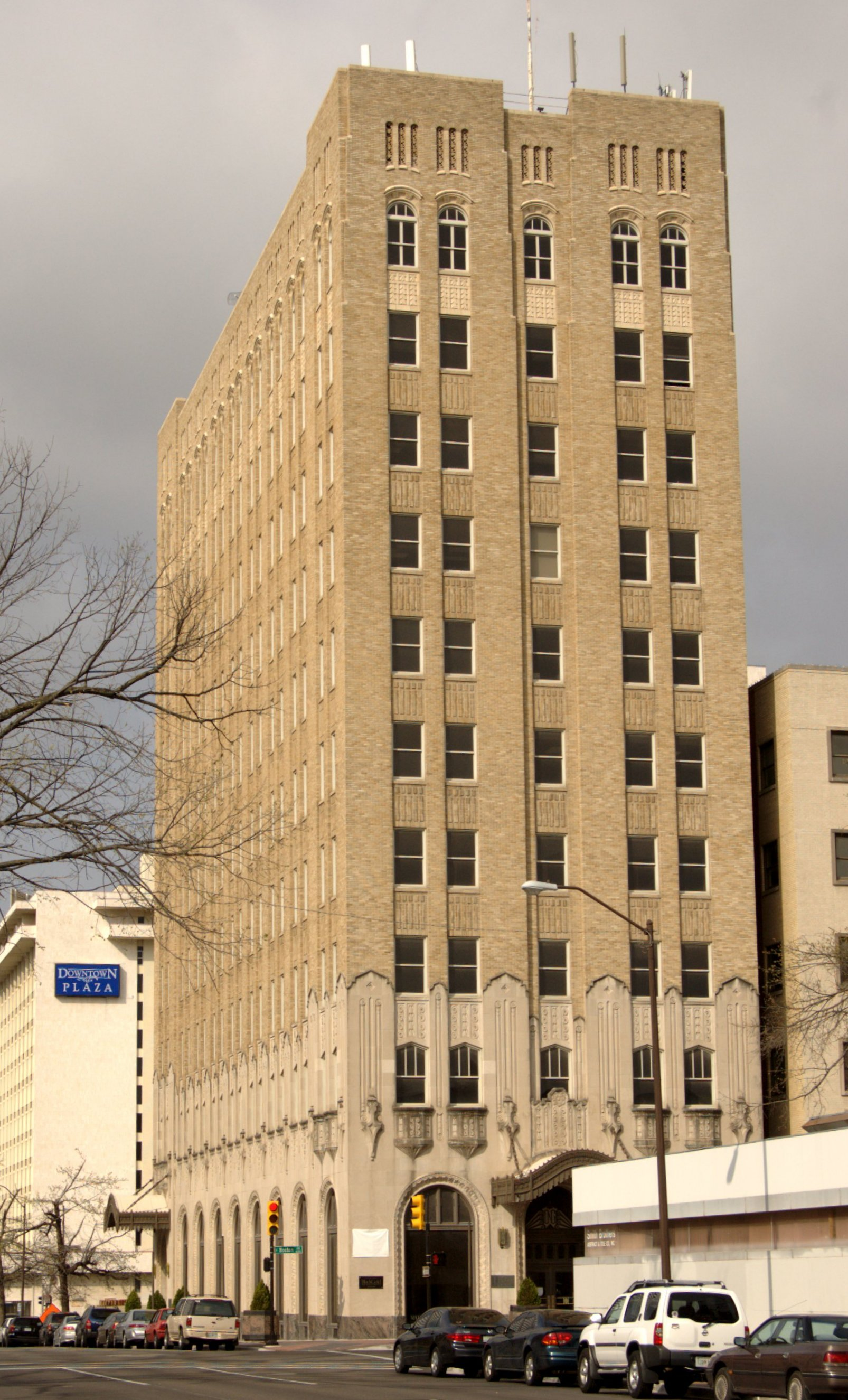
Former ONG Building

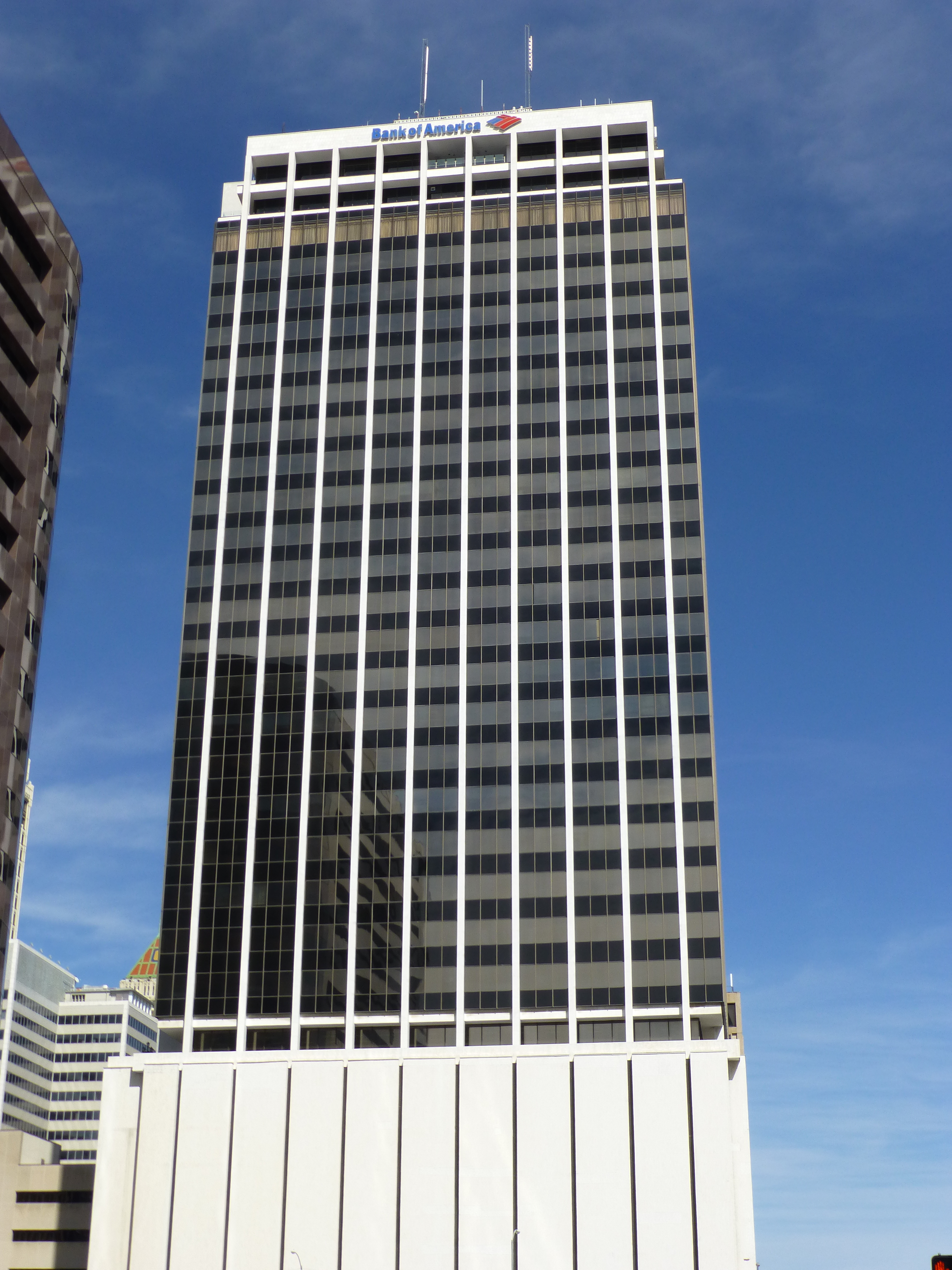
Bank of America Center
(Formerly 4th National Bank)

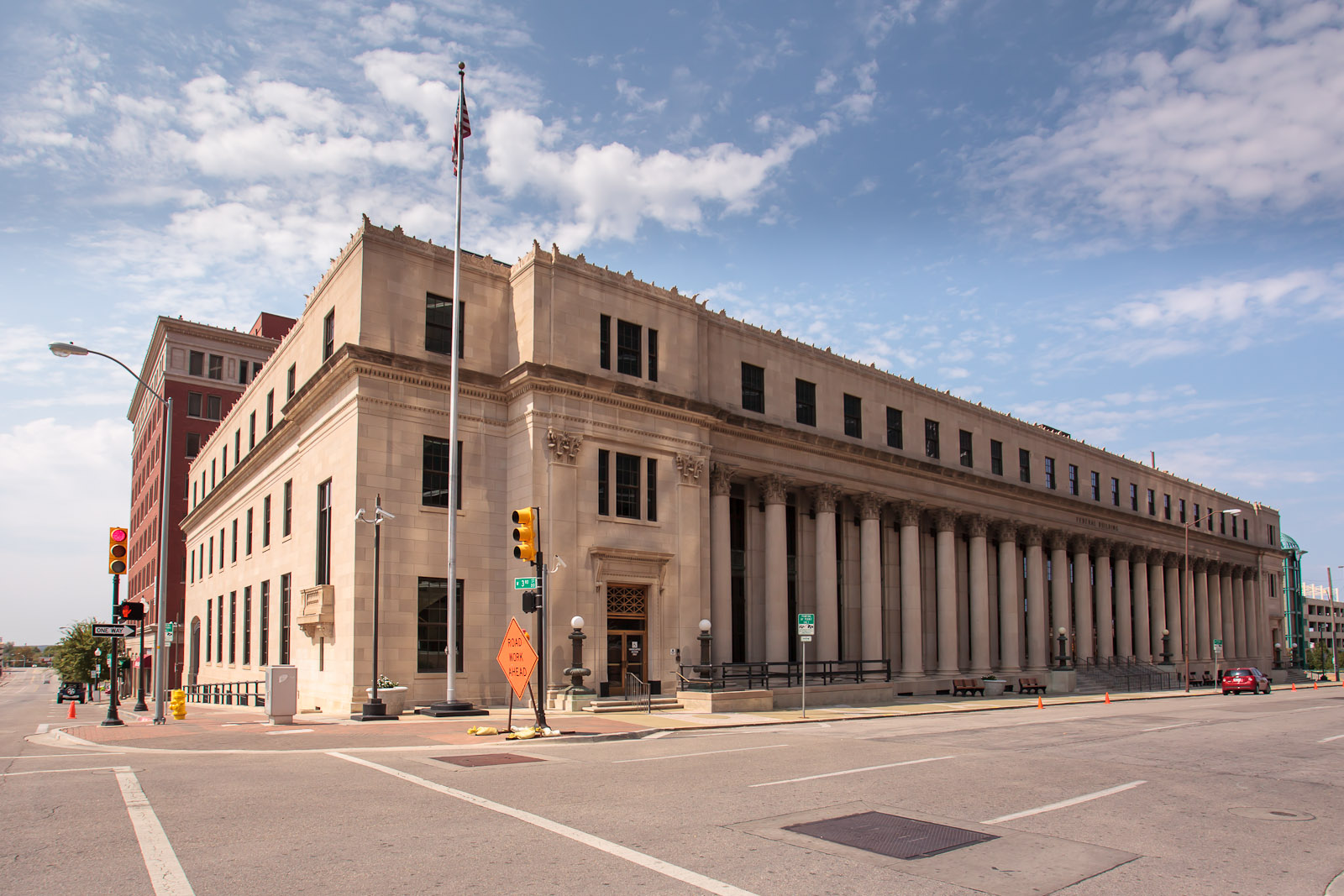
Former main post office

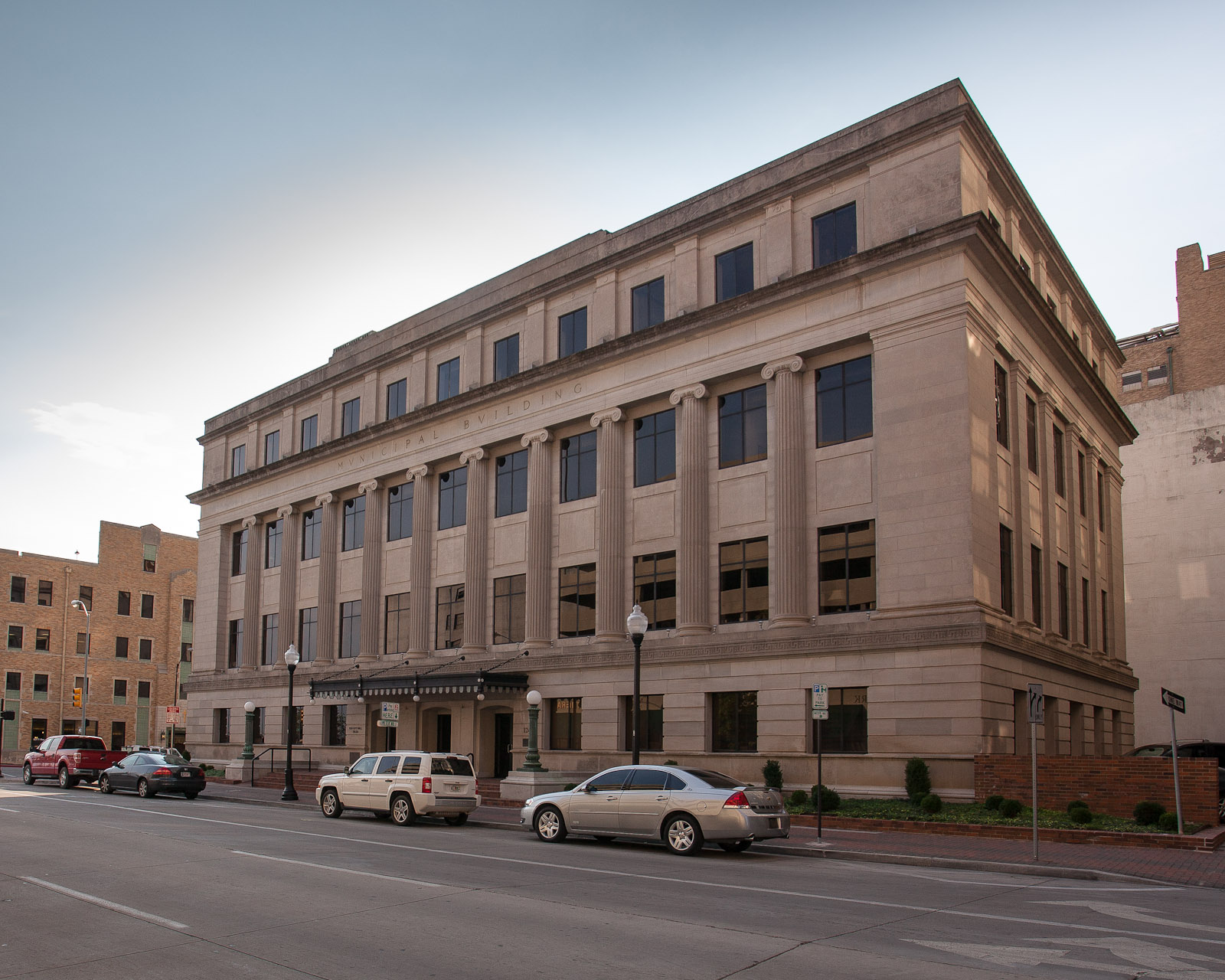
Former Tulsa Municipal Building
115 East 4th Street

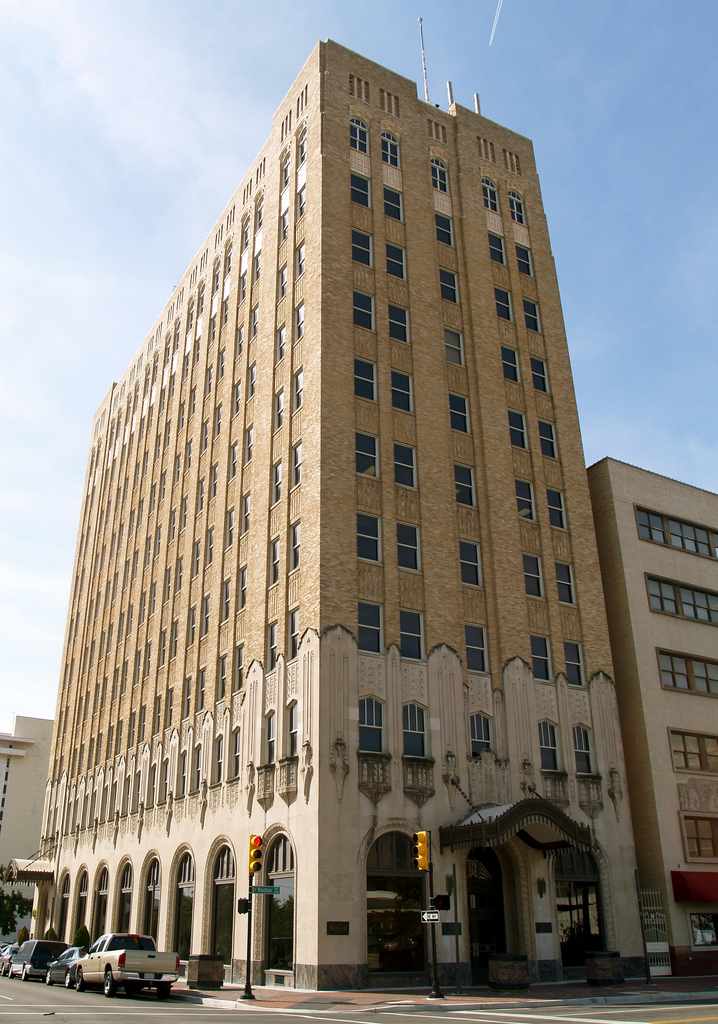
Oklahoma Natural Gas Co. Building
624 South Boston Avenue

=== Non-contributing buildings ===
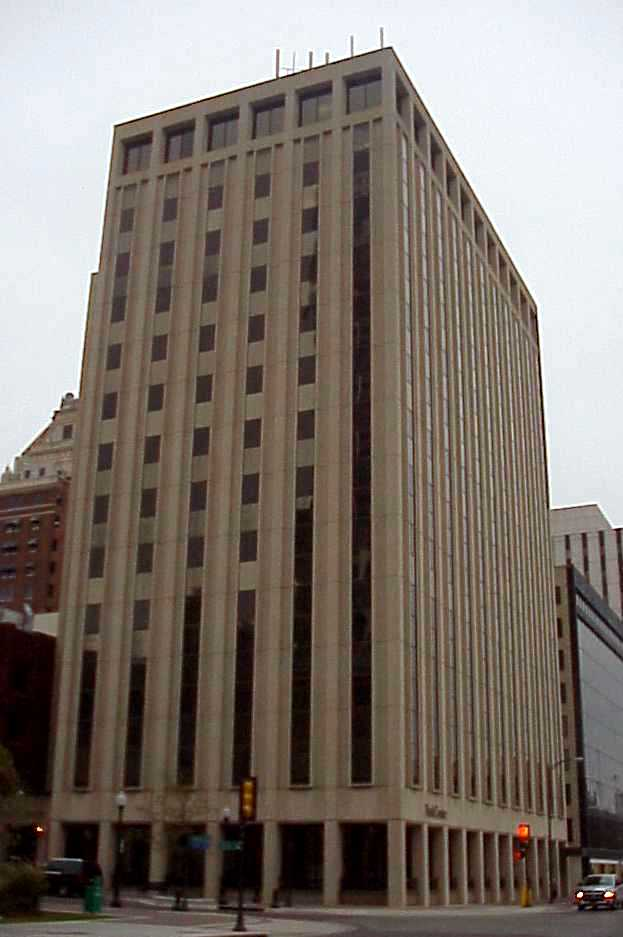
Park Centre Building (1973)
525 Main Street

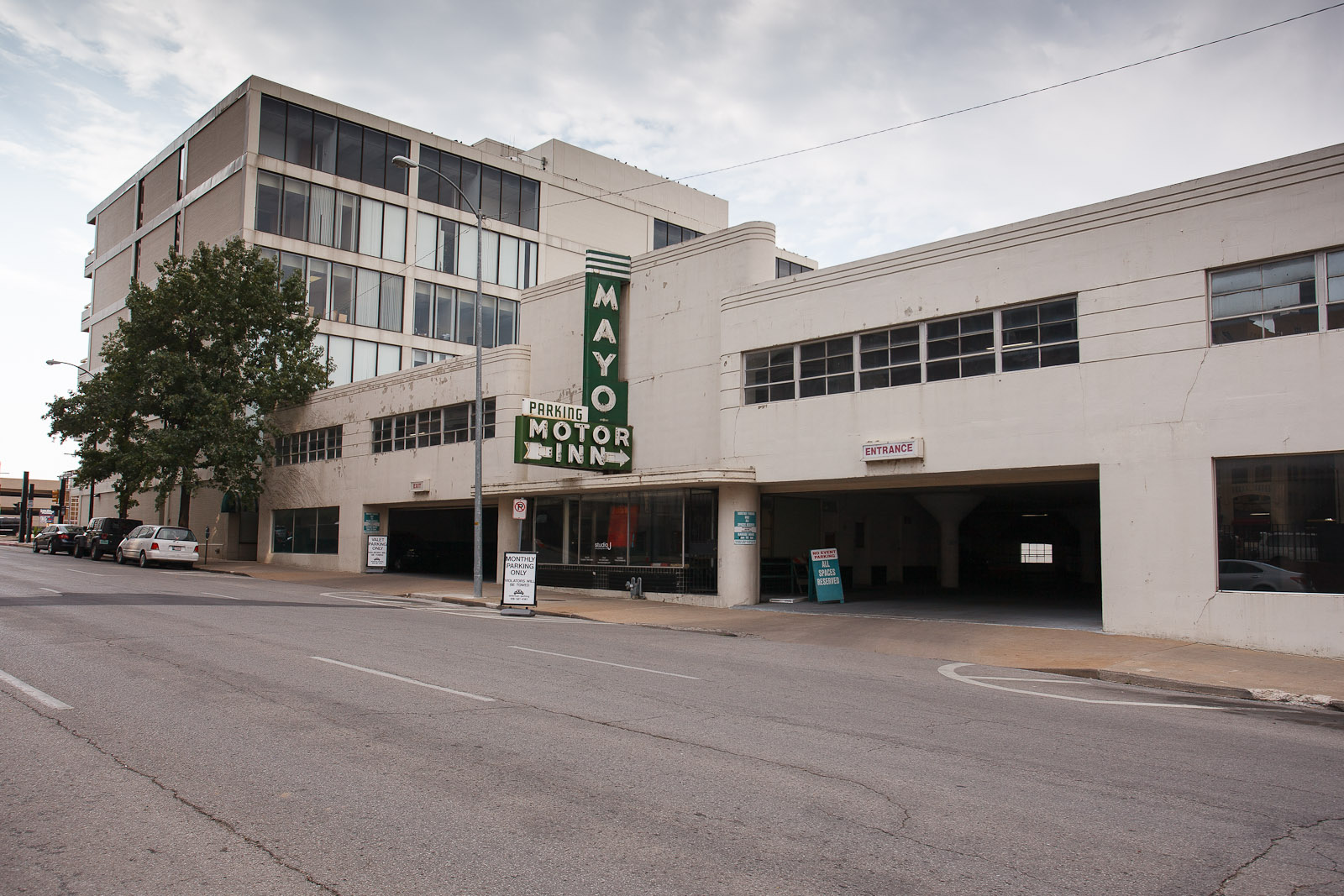
Former Mayo Hotel Garage

== Additional information ==
National Register of Historic Places Registration Form Retrieved June 19, 2014. (Also available here.)
