= Petroleum Building (Tulsa) =

Building in Tulsa, Oklahoma

- U.S. National Register of Historic Places
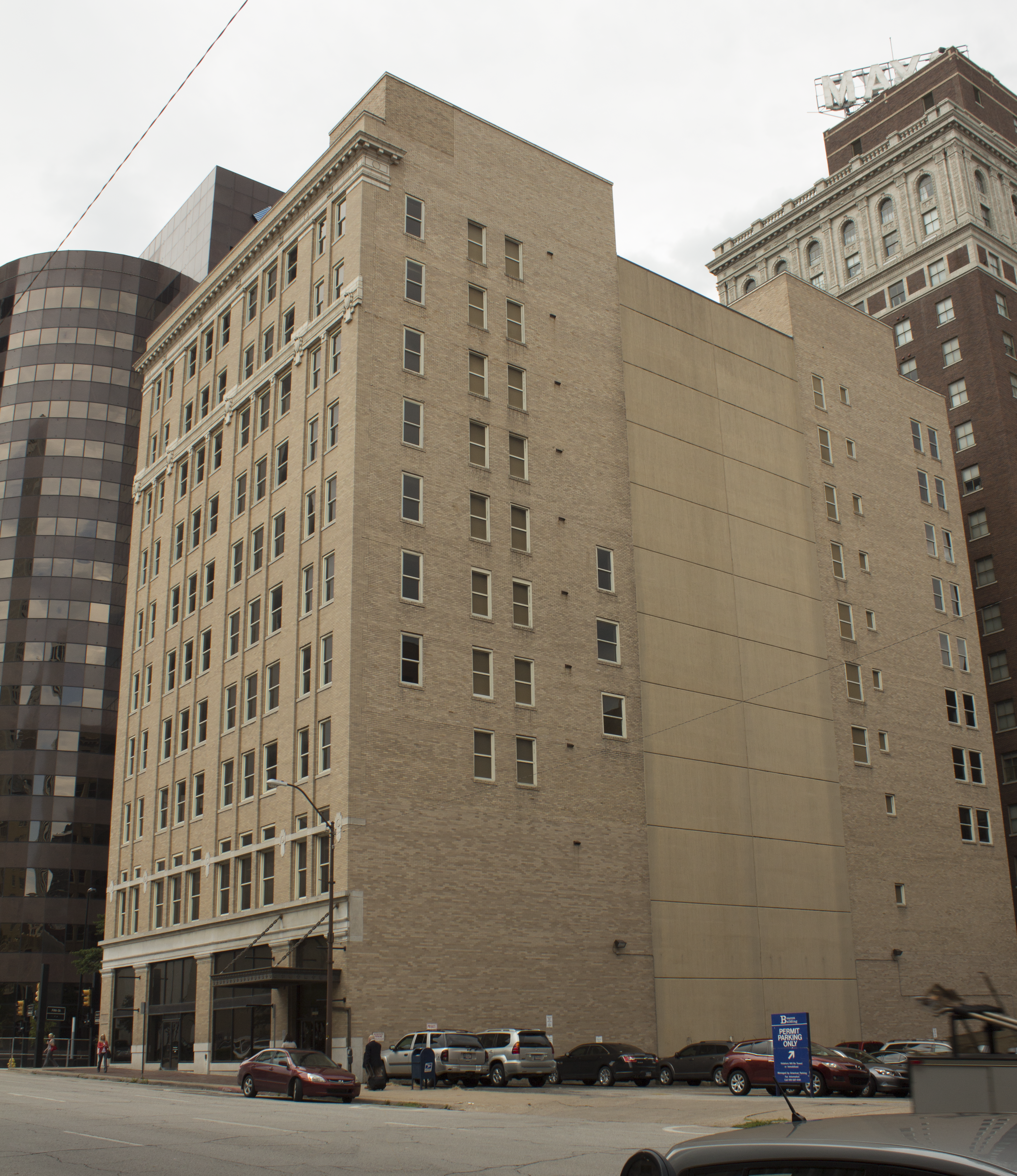

- Location within Oklahoma Location within the United States
- Location: 420 S. Boulder Street; Tulsa, Oklahoma
- Coordinates: 36°9′4″N 95°59′29″W
- Area: 0.90 acres (0.36 ha)
- Built: 1921
- NRHP reference No.: 82003706
- Added to NRHP: April 15, 1982

The Petroleum Building is a 50 m (164 ft) 10-floor building at 420 South Boulder in Tulsa, Oklahoma. It was built in 1921, and is a steel and reinforced concrete structure faced with buff brick. The name was given because most of the early tenants were associated with the petroleum industry. Later, it housed the Mayo Brothers Furniture Company. It was identified as one of the supporting structures during the creation of the Oil Capital Historic District.

The simple facade is said to be typical of the pre-Art Deco designs used in many downtown Tulsa buildings.
