= Oklahoma City Convention Center =

Convention center in Oklahoma City, Oklahoma

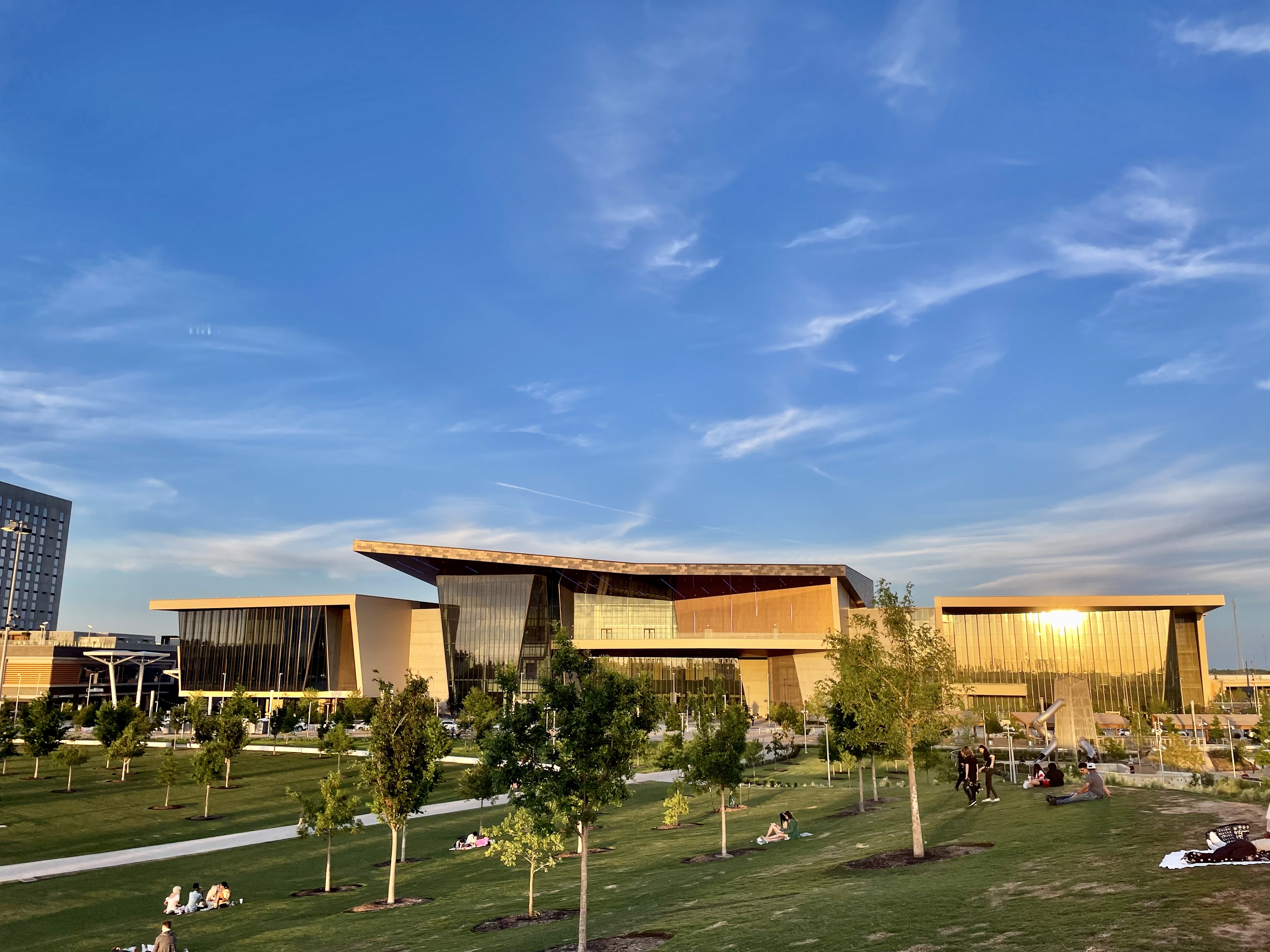
- The Oklahoma City Convention Center
- Interactive map of Oklahoma City Convention Center
- Address: 100 Mick Cornett Drive
- Location: Oklahoma City, Oklahoma, U.S.
- Coordinates: 35°27′37″N 97°30′54″W
- Owner: City of Oklahoma City
- Operator: ASM Global
- Public transit: Oklahoma City Streetcar

Construction
- Built: 2018–2020
- Opened: January 5, 2021
- Construction cost: $288 million
- Architect: Populous

Website
- okcconventioncenter.com

The Oklahoma City Convention Center is a convention center in downtown Oklahoma City, Oklahoma just east of Scissortail Park adjacent to the Omni Hotel. The center opened in 2021 as part of OKC's MAPS 3 initiative. it replaced the former Cox Convention Center as Oklahoma City's main convention venue.

== History ==
The new convention center was approved by Oklahoma City voters in 2009 in the MAPS 3 program, which funded development and infrastructure projects throughout the city including the convention center.

Early renders for the center were released in 2015, showing a modern glass exterior near Scissortail Park and Interstate 40.

Construction on the project began in June 2018. During development, the city also worked on traffic improvements, including a roundabout to reduce congestion surrounding the facility and nearby streets.

By late 2019, the structure was nearing completion. Media tours of the building began in early 2020, several months before its official opening.

The convention center opened to the public on January 5, 2021. Public tours were later offered following completion of the convention center.

== Design ==
The convention center contains approximately 500,000 square feet (46,000 m^{2}) of meeting and event space, including a 200,000 square foot main exhibit hall, 45,000 square feet of meeting space that can be subdivided into 27 different meeting rooms, a 30,000 square foot ballroom on the 4th floor, and a 4,000 square foot balcony.

The facility was designed by the architecture firm Populous, and built by Flintco. Large glass walls, open areas, and exterior balconies were built into the building's design to showcase the next-door Scissortail Park and the surrounding downtown area. The facility also has loading docks, kitchens, and other features to attract bigger events.

The convention center is located next to the Omni Oklahoma City Hotel, which was developed alongside the center to support convention activity.

== Events ==
The convention center hosts conventions, exhibitions, sporting competitions, corporate meetings, and community events, including a LEGO-themed convention.

In 2026, the facility hosted the Women’s and Men’s Development Program National Championships, hosting nearly 1,600 athletes.

== Impact ==
The convention center was the largest project completed under MAPS initiatives.

The project was intended to draw national conventions to expand tourist activity in Oklahoma City. Its construction coincided with other major development efforts (some of which were part of MAPS initiatives) including Scissortail Park, the Oklahoma City Streetcar system, and the nearby Omni hotel.

== See also ==
- MAPS 3
- Scissortail Park
- Cox Convention Center
- Omni Oklahoma City Hotel
