= City Place Tower (Oklahoma City) =

Skyscraper in Oklahoma City, Oklahoma

City Place
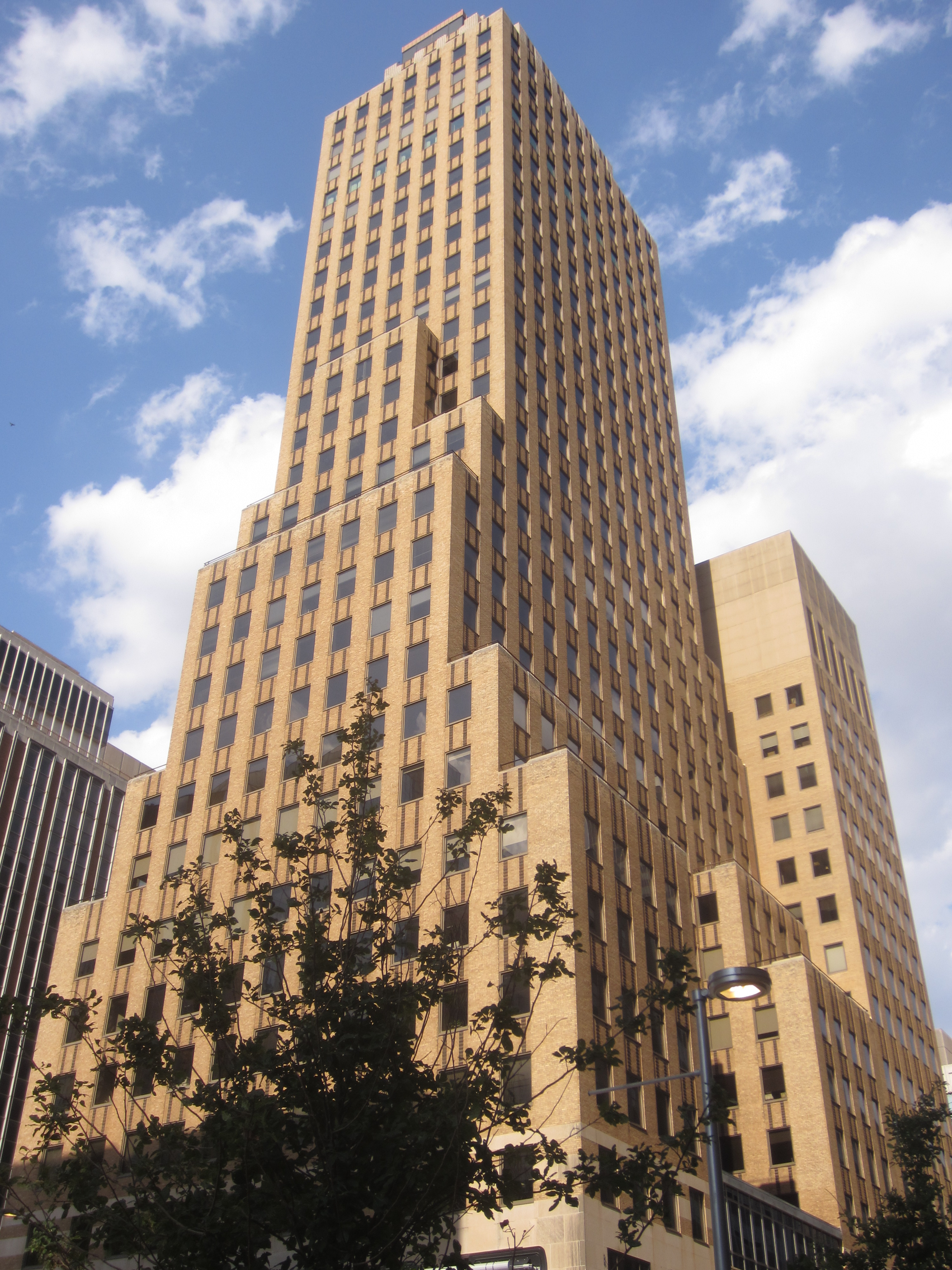
- City Place Tower in the CBD of Oklahoma City.
- Interactive map of the City Place area

General information
- Status: Completed
- Type: Office/Residential
- Location: 200 Park Avenue, Oklahoma City, Oklahoma; United States
- Coordinates: 35°28′08″N 97°30′57″W
- Completed: 1931
- Opening: 1931
- Cost: $3M

Height
- Roof: 391 ft (119 m)

Technical details
- Floor count: 33
- Floor area: 292,305 sq ft (27,156.0 m^{2})

Design and construction
- Architects: Walter W. Ahlschlager and Clair Drury

City Place is a mixed-use skyscraper in downtown Oklahoma City, in the U.S. state of Oklahoma. At 391 ft (119m), it is the 7th tallest building in the city and has 33 floors. Finished in 1931, it was Oklahoma City's tallest building for a short time before it lost the title to First National Center in the same year. In 2010, the top seven floors were converted into six condos; the penthouse condo occupies the top two floors.

It is currently the 13th tallest building in Oklahoma.

== History ==
Constructed as the Ramsey Tower in 1931 by oilman W.R. Ramsey, City Place was involved in the "Great Race" with the First National Tower to become the first to top out, a race that Ramsey won. The building was constructed in nine months by the Starrett Corporation, known for the construction of the Empire State Building. Ramsey's fortunes were short-lived, victim of the Great Depression, and the building was soon leased to the Anderson-Prichard Company (APCO) and the APCO Tower Corporation was formed where J. Steve Anderson served as President. The building was later leased to Liberty National Bank, who remained its primary tenant until completion of the Liberty Tower in 1971. During Liberty's tenure, a skybridge was constructed at the 16th floor, connecting it to the Dowell Center. The bridge was, at the time, the highest such structure in the world. After Liberty Bank moved out, City National Bank moved in and constructed what was once the building's most distinctive feature, a rooftop marquee, which was removed when the building was renovated in the 1980s. Another unique feature of City Place is the original fire escape, which is still in use. It consists of a spiral slide traveling the full height of the building. This was supplemented by a traditional staircase during Liberty Bank's tenure. Previous names of the building are: Ramsey Tower, APCO Tower, Liberty Bank Tower, City National Tower, Sonic Plaza, and First City Place.

== Architecture ==
Although it was constructed in the Art Deco style in 1931, the building was renovated in the 1980s, modifying its architectural style by giving it a massive rooftop marquee, now removed.

The building was designed by Walter W. Ahlschlager and Claire Drury.

== Notable tenants ==
Newmark Grubb Levy Strange Beffort, a real estate firm with ties to Cantor Fitzgerald and BGC Partners.

Anderson Prichard Oil Corporation

Oklahoma Commissioners of the Land Office

Oklahoma Department of Securities

UMB Financial Corporation, based in Kansas City, Missouri, has offices in the building.

== See also ==
- List of tallest buildings in Oklahoma City
- List of tallest buildings in Oklahoma

Preceded by Dowell Center	Tallest Buildings in Oklahoma City; 1931; 134m	Succeeded by First National Center
