= Leadership Square =

Skyscraper in Oklahoma City, Oklahoma

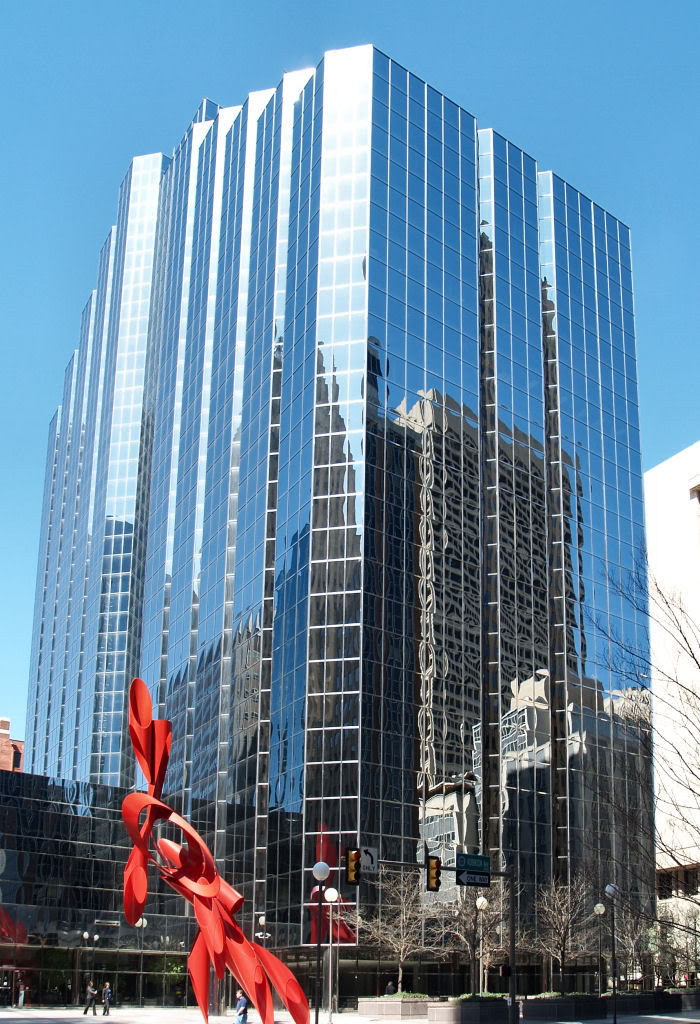
- One Leadership Square and Galaxy sculpture
- Interactive map of the Leadership Square area

General information
- Status: Completed
- Type: Office
- Location: 211 North Robinson Avenue, Oklahoma City, Oklahoma, United States
- Coordinates: 35°28′10″N 97°31′00″W
- Construction started: 1982
- Opening: 1984
- Cost: $94 million
- Owner: Oliver Investments
- Operator: Newmark Grubb Levy Strange Beffort

Height
- Roof: 285 ft (87 m)

Technical details
- Floor count: 22 and 16
- Floor area: 782,315 feet^{2}

Design and construction
- Architects: Robert B. Roloff, Bozalis & Roloff
- Developer: Leadership Properties Inc.
- Structural engineer: Grossman-Keith Engineering; ZFI Engineering
- Main contractor: H.A. Lott, Inc.

Leadership Square is a mixed-use office tower complex in downtown Oklahoma City, Oklahoma, United States. The complex was completed in 1984 and comprises One Leadership Square (North Tower) and Two Leadership Square (South Tower). One Leadership Square is taller at 285 feet (87 m) and 22 stories. Two Leadership Square is 224 feet (68 m) and 16 stories. They are the 10th and 19th tallest buildings in Oklahoma City, respectively.

== History ==
The Pei Plan is a master redevelopment plan prepared for Oklahoma City in the 1960s. The plan called for the demolition of existing structures and construction of new commercial buildings in much of the downtown area, including that now occupied by Leadership Square. Plans for the site originally included an office tower of at least 60 stories. The collapse of Penn Square Bank in 1982 and softening oil market created tenancy concerns and the design was reduced. Daon Development Corporation was originally involved as the developer, but perceived antagonism toward non-U.S. entities and Daon's indebtedness resulted in a change to Leadership Properties Inc., the real estate subsidiary of Oklahoma Land and Exploration Company.

The building, when constructed in 1984, was owned by Metropolitan Life Insurance Company and managed by CB Richard Ellis. The total cost of $94 million was the most paid for a building in Oklahoma City to that date. The Leadership Square building replaced, in part, the seven-story Local Federal Savings and Loan tower, built in 1958. The oil price collapse in the mid-1980s adversely impacted occupancy and value immediately after its opening.

In April 2000, MetLife sold Leadership Square to LSQ Investors, an affiliate of Dorchester Capital. This transaction placed the building in local ownership. The $45 million price equated to $57.52 per square foot, lower than expected. As of the sale in 2000, the building was 78 percent leased, with a lease rate of $13.50 per square foot per year. Price Edwards & Company assumed management responsibilities. In 2000, major tenants included Bank of America, Massachusetts Mutual Life Insurance Company, Merrill Lynch, Paine Webber, Smith Barney, and Grant Thornton, as well as local law firms McAfee & Taft, Phillips McFall McVay, and Gable & Gotwals.

In May 2005, Oliver Investments purchased Leadership Square for $61 million. The property had an appraised value of $77 million. The lease rate ranged from $14.50 to $16.00 per square foot. Newmark Grubb Levy Strange Beffort facilitated the transaction and assumed management of the building. Leadership Square's major tenants were Bank of America, McAfee & Taft, Phillips McFall McVay, Massachusetts Mutual Life Insurance Co., Merrill Lynch, Paine Webber, Smith Barney, Gable & Gotwals Attorneys and Grant Thornton.

In 2012, the annual lease rate was $18.50 per square foot. As of 2017, the annual lease rate is $24 per square foot.

== Features ==
The Leadership Square building contains 782,315 square feet, with 735,000 leasable square-feet. A four-story atrium connects the two towers. The lot is 2.24 acres in central downtown Oklahoma City. The building has a two-level 340-car parking garage and a direct connection to the Oklahoma City Underground green tunnel.

The east plaza includes the 14 ton, 45 feet high sculpture "Galaxy" by Alexander Liberman. The sculpture was commissioned from Liberman by art advisor Sharon Corgan Leeber of Architectural Arts Company for her client Leadership Properties, Inc. The piece was dedicated in 1985.

== Architecture ==
Leadership Square employs a classic International Style Modernist glass-and-steel design. The design implements PPG solarban glass technology to block solar heating.

== Tenants ==
- BKD, LLP
- Bank of America
- Cardinal River Energy
- Conner & Winters, LLP
- Elias, Books, Brown & Nelson, PC
- Enable Midstream Partners, LP
- Gable Gotwals Counsel
- Gardner Tanenbaum Holdings
- Grant Thornton
- McAfee & Taft
- Moricoli Kellogg & Gleason, PC
- PricewaterhouseCoopers
- Tomlinson, Rust, McKinstry & Grable, PC
- Valiant Artificial Lift Solutions
- Wells Nelson and Associates
- Wilguess & Garrett

== Events ==
The Little Willie's Triple Dog Dare is a tower running event held annually from 2012 to 2021. The race involved running 138 flights of stairs in both towers and the adjacent 31-story Oklahoma Tower. Race sponsors claim that the event is the only tower running race in which participants run down as well as up stairs. Divisions include individuals, teams, and firefighters in full gear. A Triple Dog Squared option doubles the flights. Proceeds benefit local charities.

In 2017, the OKC Over the Edge fundraising event for the Central Oklahoma Habitat for Humanity involved rappelling from the top of Two Leadership Square.

== See also ==
- List of tallest buildings in Oklahoma City
