= BOK Park Plaza =

Office skyscraper in Oklahoma City, Oklahoma

Coordinates: 35°28′0.88″N 97°31′11.98″W

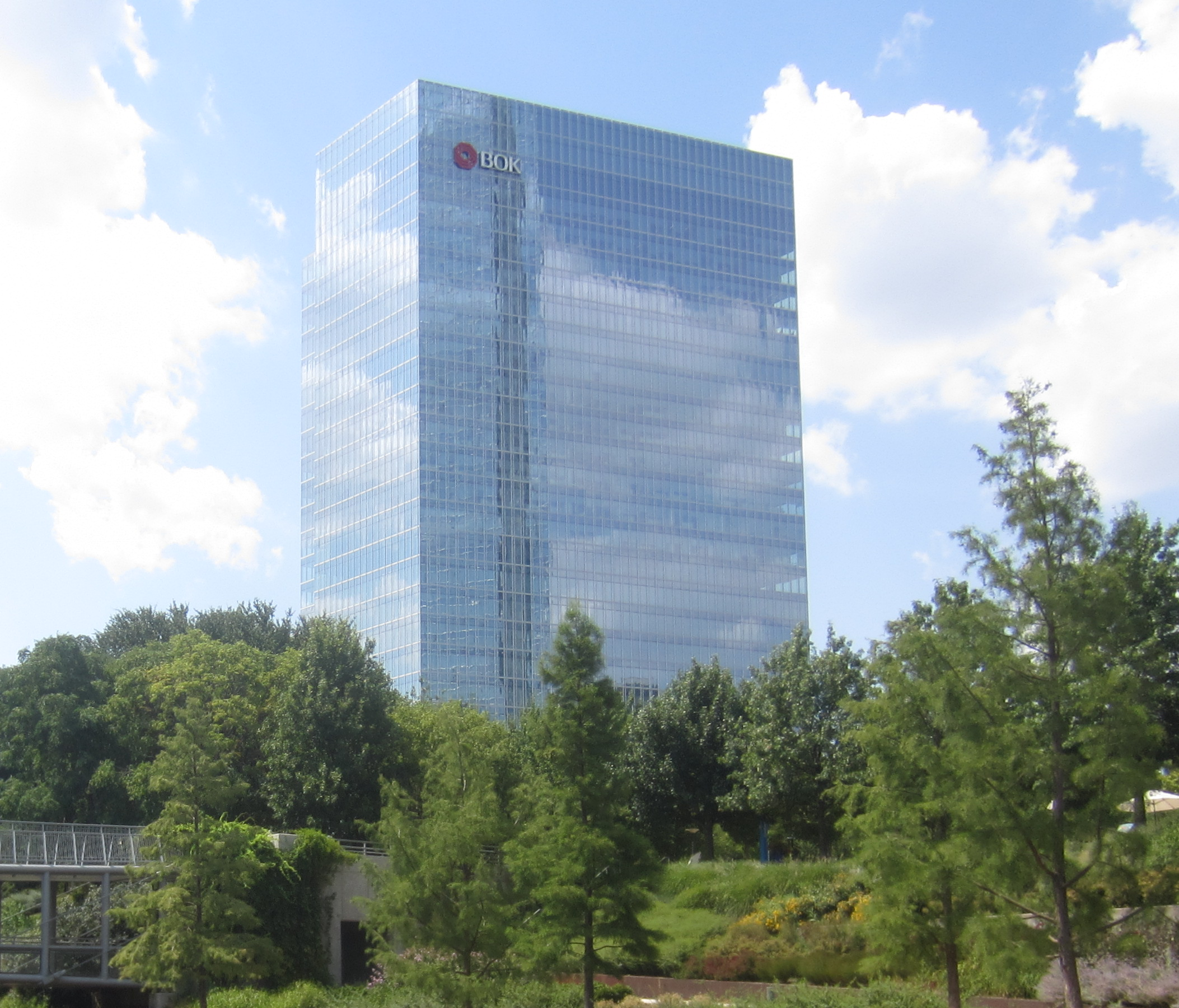

General information
- Status: Completed
- Type: Office
- Architectural style: Modern
- Classification: skyscraper
- Location: central business district, 427-499 West Sheridan Avenue
- Construction started: 2015
- Topped-out: 2017
- Completed: 2018
- Owner: Hines Interests Limited Partnership

Height
- Height: 433 ft (132 m)

Technical details
- Material: Steel, Glass
- Size: 750,000 square feet (69,700 m^{2})
- Floor count: 27

Design and construction
- Architect: Pickard Chilton
- Structural engineer: Walter P. Moore
- Main contractor: JE Dunn

BOK Park Plaza is an office skyscraper in Oklahoma City, Oklahoma. Construction began in 2015 and the building was completed in 2018. At a height of 433 ft (132 m), it is the fourth tallest building in Oklahoma City. The building contains 27 floors and received an LEED-CS GOLD energy label.

Bank of Oklahoma has their Oklahoma City headquarters offices here.

== Construction ==
In 2015, One North Hudson, the Motor Hotel, the Union Bus Station, and several other small buildings were demolished to make way for the BOK Park Plaza. In November 2015, the crane was installed. On May 27, 2017, the building topped-out.

== Tenants ==
- Bank of Oklahoma Oklahoma City Headquarters
- Devon Energy Corporation
- Enable Midstream Partners World Headquarters

== See also ==
- List of tallest buildings in Oklahoma City
- List of tallest buildings in Oklahoma
