= Union Plaza =

Union Plaza may refer to:

- Union Plaza (Oklahoma City), U.S.
- Union Plaza Hotel or Union Plaza Casino, former names of Plaza Hotel & Casino, Las Vegas, U.S.
