= Devon Energy Center =

Skyscraper in Oklahoma City, Oklahoma

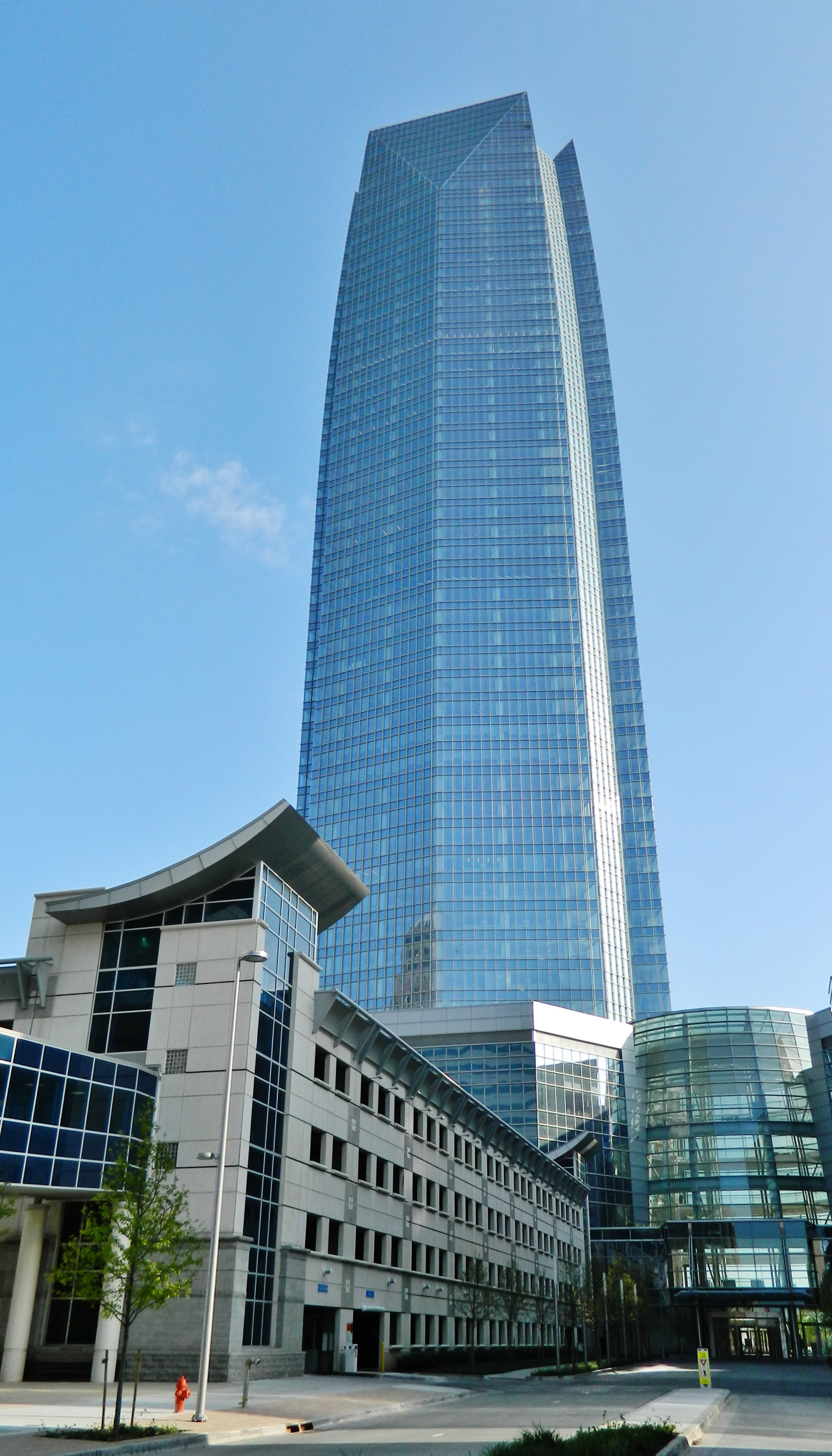
- Devon Energy Center, April 2012

Record height
- Tallest in Oklahoma since 2011^{[I]}

General information
- Status: Completed
- Type: Office with restaurant
- Location: 333 W Sheridan Ave; Oklahoma City, Oklahoma, United States
- Coordinates: 35°28′00″N 97°31′03″W
- Named for: Devon Energy Corporation
- Construction started: October 6, 2009
- Completed: October 23, 2012
- Cost: $750 million (est.) (c. $1.05 billion today)
- Owner: Devon Energy Corporation

Height
- Architectural: 844 ft (257 m)
- Roof: 844 ft (257 m)
- Top floor: 746 ft (227 m)

Technical details
- Floor count: 50 (+2 basement floors)
- Floor area: 1,800,000 square feet (167,000 m^{2})
- Lifts/elevators: 52 (total)

Design and construction
- Architect: Pickard Chilton
- Developer: Devon Realty Advisors Inc.
- Main contractor: Hines

The Devon Energy Center (also known as the Devon Tower) is a 50-story corporate skyscraper in downtown Oklahoma City, Oklahoma. The building was designed by architecture firm Pickard Chilton. It is the tallest building in the state, though it has fewer floors than the 52-story BOK Tower in Tulsa. It is tied with Park Tower in Chicago as the 75th tallest building in the United States; at its completion Devon Tower was tied as the 39th tallest. Construction began October 6, 2009, and was completed in October 2012. The tower is located next to the historic Colcord Hotel, which Devon currently owns, on Sheridan Avenue between Hudson and Robinson Avenues.

The office tower, a six-story rotunda, and a six-story podium structure comprise more than 1,800,000 square feet (170,000 m^{2}) and was initially estimated to cost $750 million; however, the first formal appraisal of the tower and complex came in at only $707.9 million. It serves as the northern anchor of Oklahoma City's aggressive Core to Shore downtown redevelopment project.

== Background ==
Devon World Headquarters LLC, a subsidiary of Oklahoma City-based Devon Energy Corporation, built the new skyscraper to replace their existing corporate office, which was located inside the Mid America Tower (now the Continental Resources Center), as well as other commercial space that the company had been leasing in a number of office buildings in the central business district.

The Devon Energy Center was originally planned to be 54 stories and 925 feet (282 m) tall. However, subsequent space planning revisions—including a decision to locate the data center to a separate facility for security reasons—resulted in a reduced height to 844 feet (257 m), including 50 stories.

Site preparation and demolition began October 6, 2009. The Holder Construction Company served as primary general contractor, and Flintco, Inc. the minority partner in the joint venture.

== History ==
=== Construction ===
Construction started on October 6, 2009. The first crane was installed on February 25, 2010, and the second crane was installed on June 25, 2010. In July 2010, construction had reached above street level. In September 2010, construction topped the 10th floor. In November, workers started installing glass on the bottom levels of the tower. In December 2010, the building reached the 22nd floor.

Upon completion of the 34th floor, Devon Energy Center surpassed the 500-foot (150 m) Chase Tower (since renamed BancFirst Tower) as the tallest building in Oklahoma City on March 10, 2011. On May 17 of that year, the Devon Energy Center became the tallest building in Oklahoma, rising above Tulsa's 667-foot (203 m) BOK Tower. In June 2011, the building reached the 46th floor. On July 5, 2011, the building reached the 46th floor while the glass reached the 36th floor. The building marked its topping out at 50 stories in a ceremony held on September 21, 2011, as the Devon Energy Center reached its final height of 844 feet (257 m).

=== Completion and opening ===
On October 23, 2012, the building marked its opening ceremony. It was confirmed by Devon Energy CEO, J. Larry Nichols that there would not be an observation deck; however, a restaurant named "Vast" on the 49th and 50th floors would be open to the general public. Oklahoma City Mayor Mick Cornett attended the opening ceremony and stated, "The visual impact it has on the city is so striking and so identifiable. It took just over three years to complete the building that has quickly become a staple in our city's skyline."

On June 14, 2022, conservative activist Maison Des Champs conducted a free solo climb along the tower as part of an anti-abortion protest. (Incidentally, weeks prior to his feat, the Oklahoma Legislature passed several laws severely restricting abortion access in the state, including one banning the practice from the moment of conception.) He had previously gained media attention for climbing The New York Times Building in Manhattan, the Aria Resort and Casino in Las Vegas and the Salesforce Tower in San Francisco to protest abortion or COVID-19 safety protocols. Des Champs—who only used chalk for gripping—was arrested after reaching the roof of the building, and was subsequently charged on two trespassing complaints.

== Tenants ==
- Devon Energy Corporation

== Gallery ==
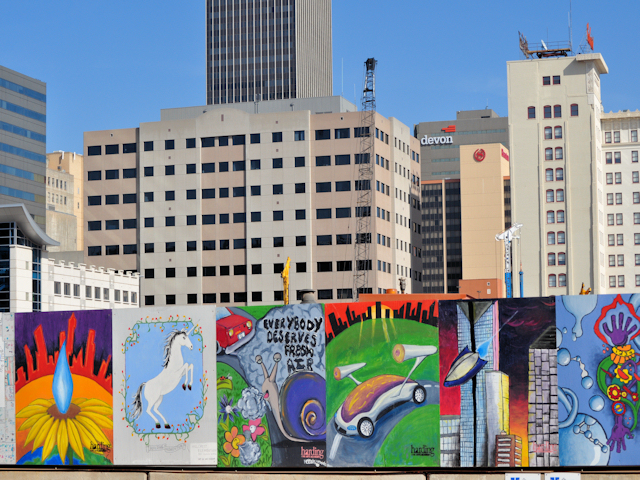
Work site February 2010

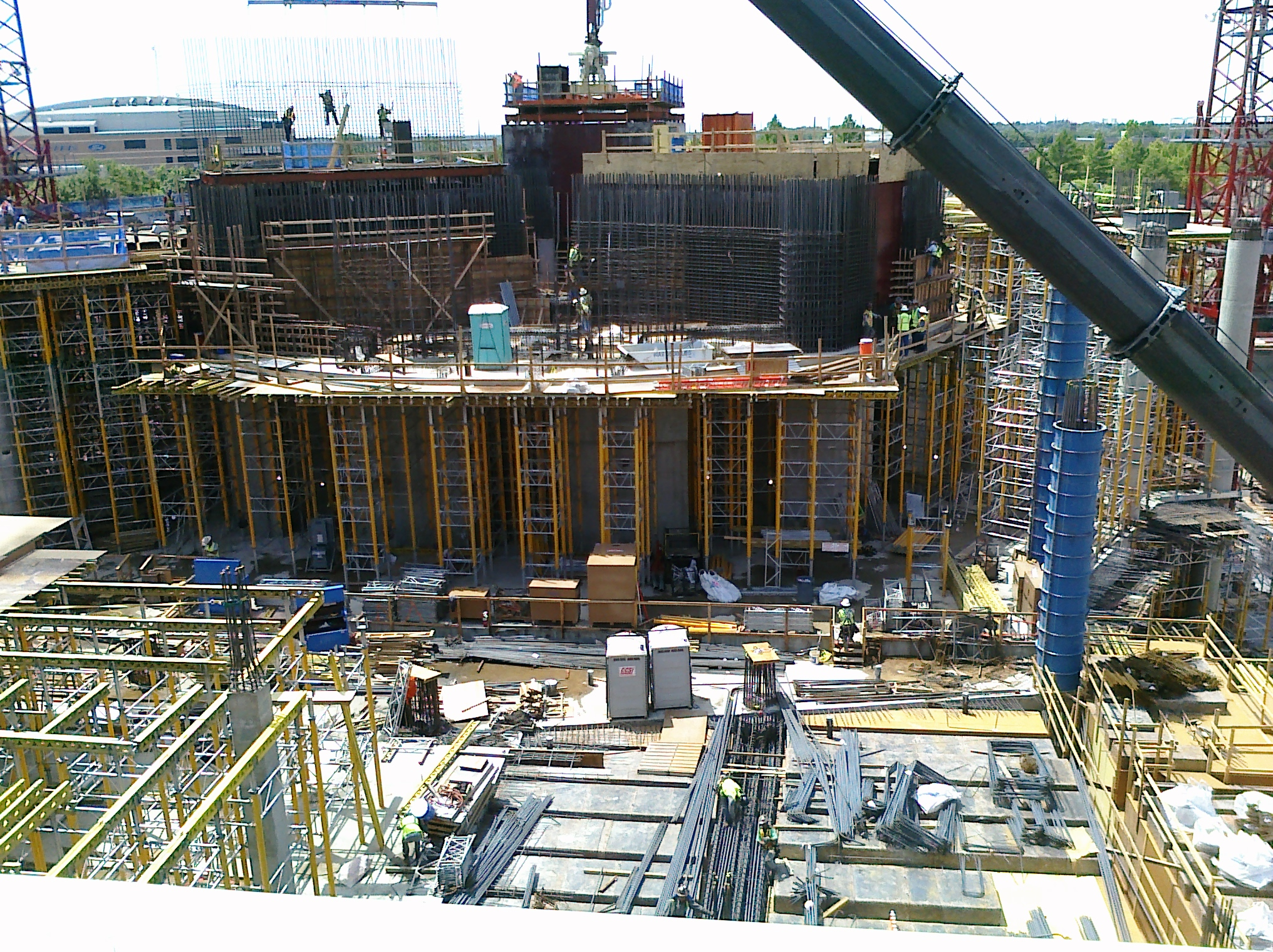
June 2010

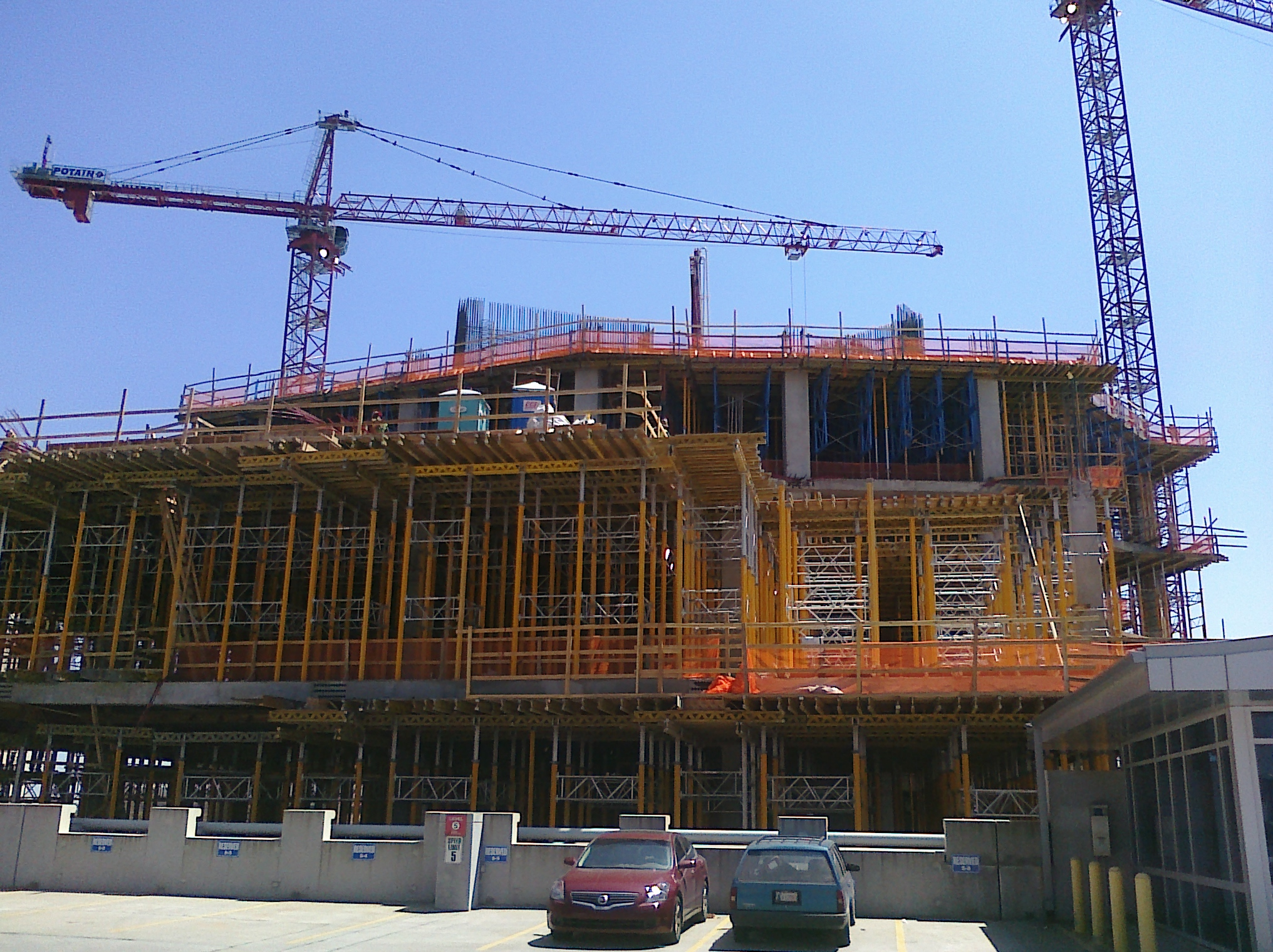
August 2010

March 2011

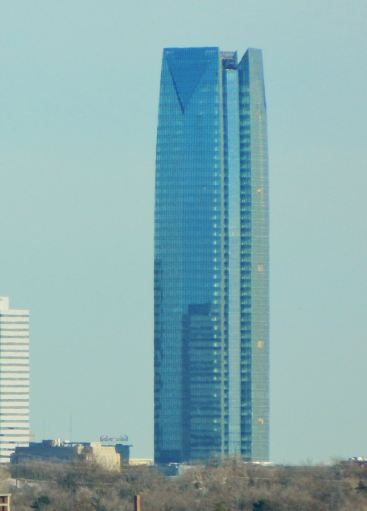
February 25, 2012

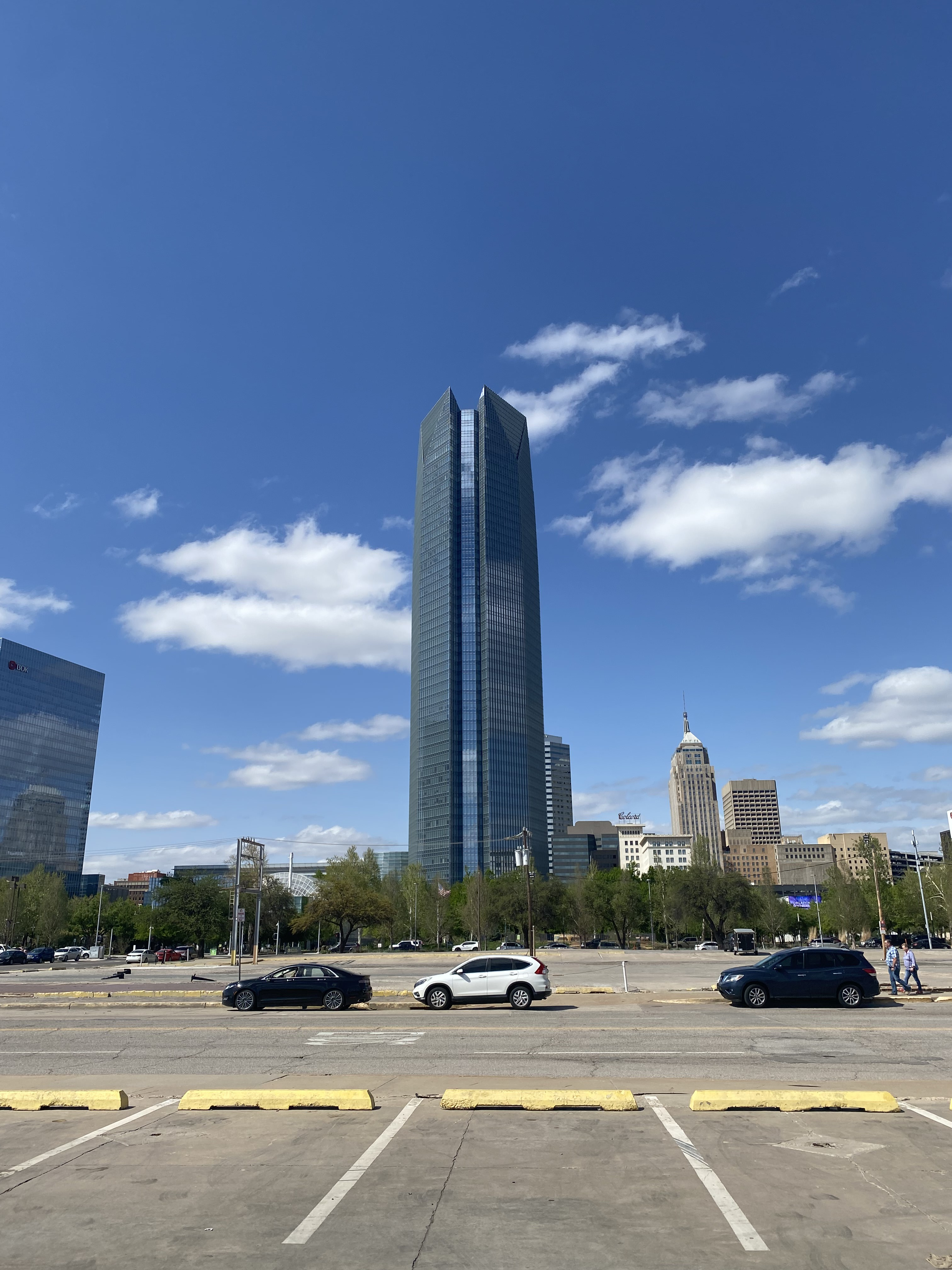
Looking north

== See also ==
- List of tallest buildings in Oklahoma City
- List of tallest buildings in Oklahoma
- List of tallest buildings in the United States

Preceded by Chase Tower	Tallest Building in Oklahoma City; 2011—current 257m	Succeeded by incumbent
