= The Classen =

Residential building in Oklahoma City, Oklahoma

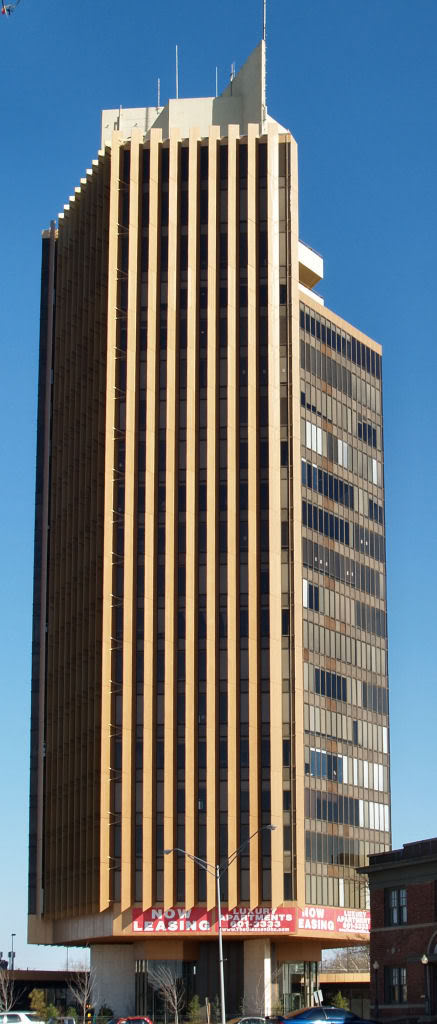
- Interactive map of the The Classen area
- Former names: Citizens Bank Tower

General information
- Status: Completed
- Type: Residential
- Location: 2200 North Classen Boulevard, Oklahoma City, Oklahoma; United States
- Coordinates: 35.4919°N 97.5308°W
- Opening: 1967
- Owner: Vesta Realty
- Operator: Vesta Realty

Height
- Roof: 273 ft (83 m)

Technical details
- Floor count: 21
- Floor area: 10,890 m^{2} (117,200 sq ft)

Design and construction
- Architects: Bozalis & Roloff; Merriman Associates/Architects, Inc
- Citizens Bank Tower
- U.S. National Register of Historic Places
- Location within Oklahoma Location within the United States
- Coordinates: 35.4919°N 97.5308°W
- Area: 2 acres (0.81 ha)
- Built: 1965–66
- NRHP reference No.: 09000978
- Added to NRHP: March 8, 2010

The Classen (originally Citizens Bank Tower) is a residential high-rise in the uptown section of Oklahoma City, near the city's Paseo Arts District and Asian District. The tower has 21 floors and is 273 feet tall. It is currently the third tallest residential building in the city. It was listed on the National Register of Historic Places in 2010.

The building was finished in 1967 as the headquarters of the defunct Citizens National Bank. The tower was later renovated and now consists of residential apartments for rent. The luxury apartments are known for their tall picturesque windows with breathtaking city views and sleek interior finishes. As of 2023, the property is undergoing renovations, including the addition of lighted double vanity mirrors and other spa-like features in the bathrooms, top-of-the-line appliances and stylish finishes in the kitchens. Additionally, the property boasts an array of amenities, including a car charging station, pickleball court, sundeck, basketball court, putting greens, and a 24-hour fitness center.

== History ==
The Citizens Bank Tower is an architecturally significant building in Oklahoma City with its hexagonal plan, slender profile, unusual sunscreens and rigorously sculpted crown. It was among the first tall office buildings to be erected outside of downtown Oklahoma City, setting the standard for other distinctive large freestanding suburban skyscrapers. The Citizens Bank Tower was designed by Robert Roloff of Bozalis, who considered it a tribute to Frank Lloyd Wright and his Price Tower constructed in Bartlesville, Oklahoma. The interior of the tower has been adapted to apartment units for contemporary use. Citizens Bank Tower has been listed on the National Register of Historic Places since March 8, 2010. The listing was announced as the featured listing in the National Park Service's weekly list of March 19, 2010.

== Architecture ==
The Classen is modeled under the modern school of construction and has an exposed concrete narrow base.

== See also ==
- Price Tower
- List of tallest buildings in Oklahoma City
- National Register of Historic Places listings in Oklahoma County, Oklahoma
