= Strata Tower (Oklahoma City) =

Skyscraper in Oklahoma City, Oklahoma

- Kerr-McGee Tower, SandRidge Center (former)
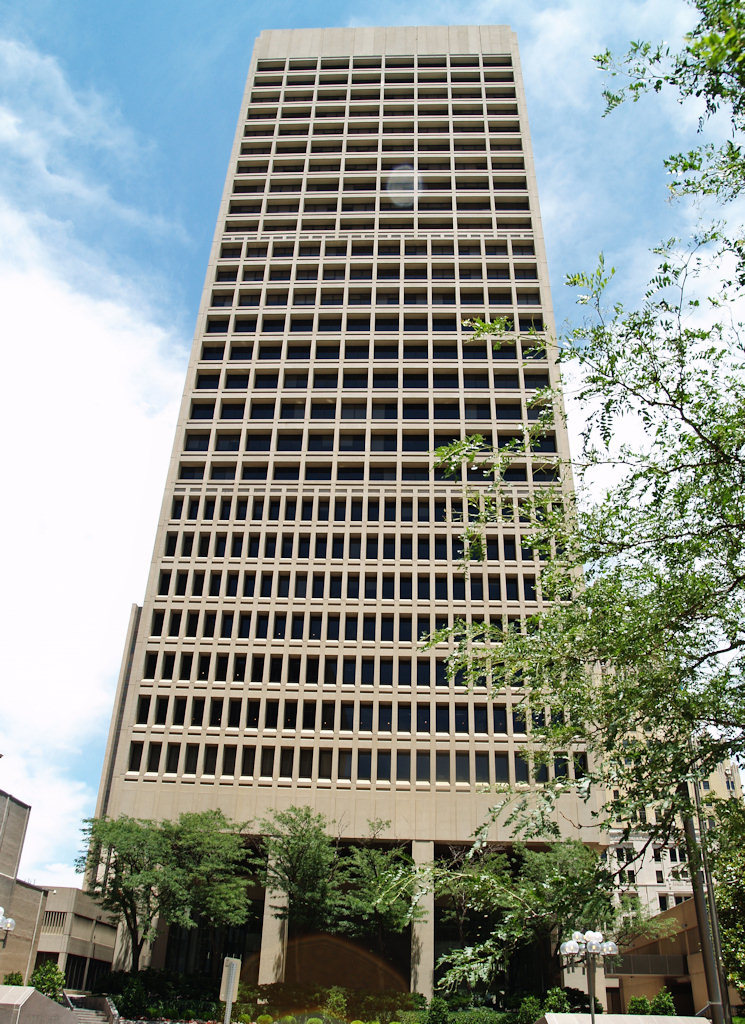
- Oklahoma Commons, in downtown Oklahoma City.
- Interactive map of the Strata Tower area

General information
- Status: Completed
- Type: Office
- Location: 123 Robert S. Kerr Avenue, Oklahoma City, Oklahoma; United States
- Coordinates: 35°28′13″N 97°30′53″W
- Opening: 1971
- Owner: State of Oklahoma

Height
- Roof: 393 ft (120 m)

Technical details
- Floor count: 30
- Floor area: 599,991 sq ft (55,741.0 m^{2})

Design and construction
- Architects: Pietro Belluschi; Frankfurt-Short-Bruza Architects

Strata Tower at Oklahoma Commons is a prominent skyscraper in the central business district of downtown Oklahoma City, in the U.S. state of Oklahoma. The tower has 30 floors and is 393 feet (120 m) tall, making it the sixth-tallest building in Oklahoma City and the eleventh-tallest in the state. It was the headquarters of gas production and exploration company SandRidge Energy Corporation. In January 2010, SandRidge announced a $100 million renovation, designed by Rogers Marvel Architects, for the building and four other buildings to be called SandRidge Commons.

In September 2020 the State of Oklahoma purchased the building and renamed it to the Oklahoma Commons. In June 2021, it was renamed to Strata Tower at Oklahoma Commons.

After the state government departments moved in, government workers criticized the complex for not being accessible to people with a disability. The complaints focused on parking and other issues.

== History ==
Until 2008, the building was known as the Kerr-McGee Tower. The former oil and gas company Kerr-McGee Corporation constructed the building in 1971 and the tower served as its corporate headquarters. The Kerr-McGee building was sold to Chesapeake Energy in August 2006 after Kerr-McGee Corp was acquired by Anadarko Petroleum. Chesapeake Energy then sold the building to SandRidge Energy in July 2007.

== Architecture ==
The building received a "25-Year Award of Excellence" from the American Institute of Architects, Oklahoma Chapter, in November 1999. In 1991, architects Frankfurt-Short-Bruza Associates were recognized as "Firm of the Year" by the American Institute of Architects' Central Oklahoma chapter. The 2010 renovation, its architects, and adjacent buildings were recognized in 2012 by the American Institute of Architects.

== Gallery ==
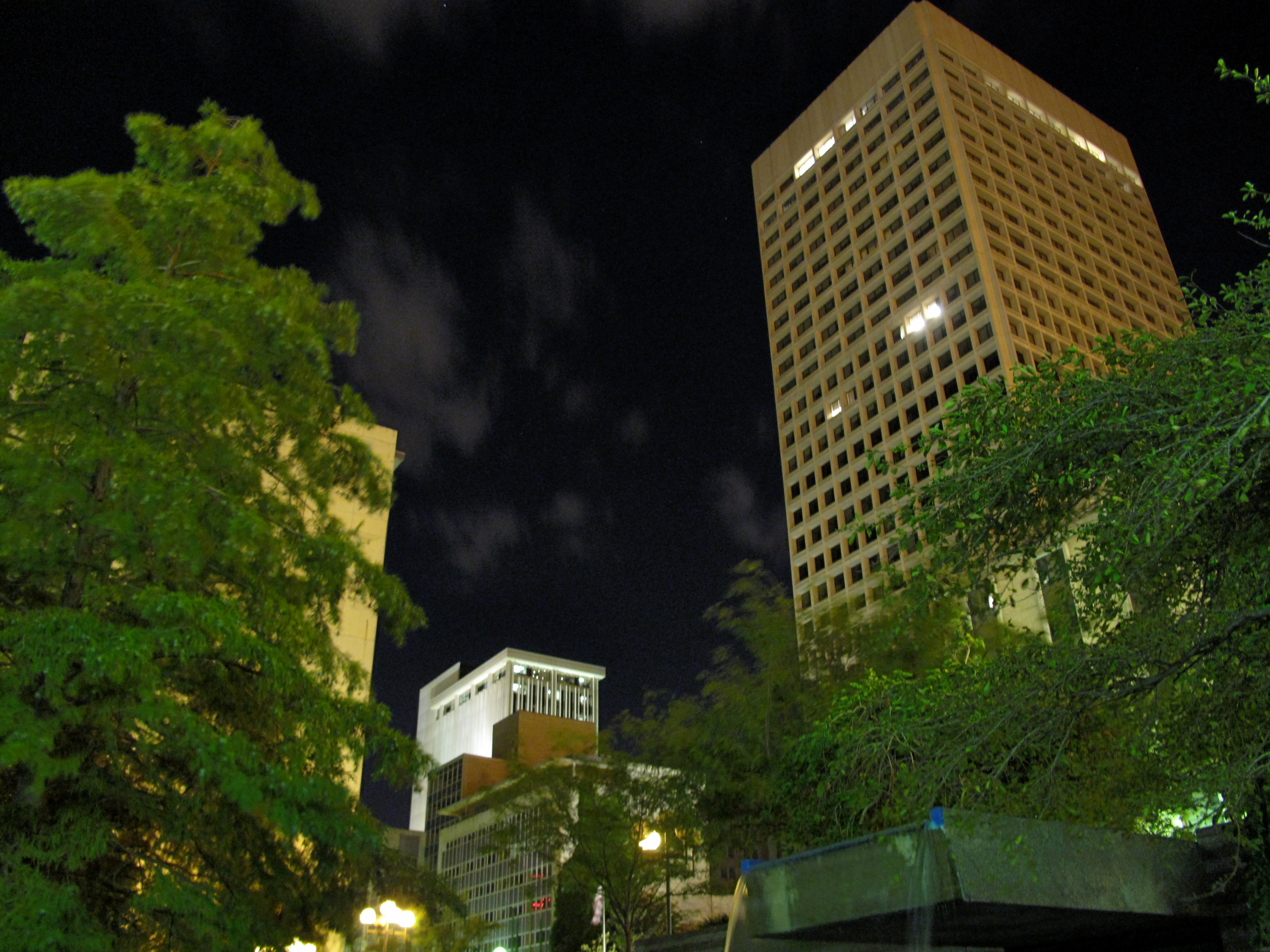
SandRidge Center at night August 2009

== Tenants ==
- Oklahoma Tax Commission
- Oklahoma State Department of Health

== See also ==
- List of tallest buildings in Oklahoma City
