= 100 Park Avenue Building =

Building in Oklahoma City, Oklahoma

- Medical Arts Building
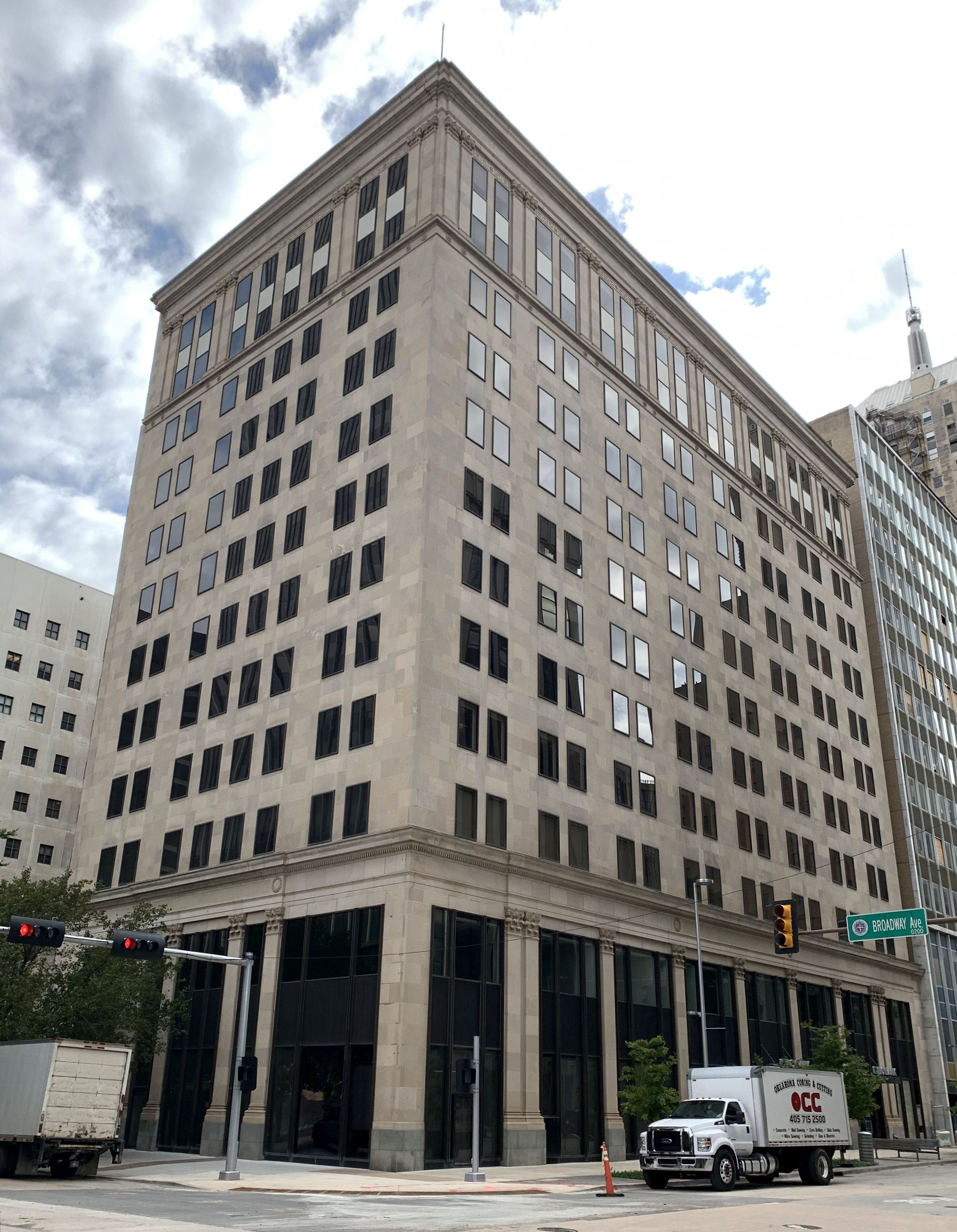
- Interactive map of the 100 Park Avenue Building area

General information
- Status: Completed
- Type: Office
- Location: 100 Park Avenue, Oklahoma City, Oklahoma; United States
- Coordinates: 35°28′07″N 97°30′52″W
- Completed: 1923
- Opening: 1923
- Renovated: 1964
- Owner: SL Green Realty

Height
- Roof: 160 ft (49 m)

Technical details
- Floor count: 12
- Floor area: 9,104 m^{2} (97,990 sq ft)

The 100 Park Avenue Building, formerly known as the Medical Arts Building, is a high-rise in downtown Oklahoma City. The 100 Park Avenue Building has 12 stories and is 160 feet (49 m) tall. The building is constructed in the Art Deco style and was designed by Solomon Andrew Layton. It opened in 1923, at which point it was the tallest building in Oklahoma City.

== Architecture ==
Art Deco style emphasizes geometric forms: spheres, polygons, rectangles, trapezoids, zigzags, chevrons, and sunburst motifs. Elements are often arranged in symmetrical patterns. Modern materials such as aluminum, stainless steel, Bakelite, chrome, and plastics are used. Colors tend to be vivid and high-contrast.

== See also ==
- List of tallest buildings in Oklahoma City

Preceded by Colcord Building	Tallest Buildings in Oklahoma City; 1923—1927; 49m	Succeeded by Dowell Center
