= Galaxy (sculpture) =

Sculpture in Oklahoma City, Oklahoma, U.S.

- The sculpture in 2019
- Artist: Alexander Liberman
- Medium: Steel
- Movement: Geometric abstraction
- Dimensions: 14 m × 8.2 m (45 ft × 27 ft)
- Weight: 14 tons
- Location: Oklahoma City, Oklahoma, U.S.
- 35.469360°N 97.516591°W
- Owner: Leadership Square

Galaxy is an outdoor sculpture by Alexander Liberman, installed outside Oklahoma City's Leadership Square, in the U.S. state of Oklahoma.

== Description ==
The abstract (geometric) welded steel sculpture is approximately 45 feet (14 m) tall and 27 feet (8.2 m) wide. It is painted red and weighs 14 tons.

== History ==
The sculpture was commissioned by art advisor Sharon Corgan Leeber of Architectural Arts Company, for her client Leadership Properties, Inc. It was constructed at Liberman's studio in Connecticut and relocated to Oklahoma City in three pieces. Liberman visited Oklahoma City to present the maquette and for the unveiling.

The work was surveyed by the Smithsonian Institution's "Save Outdoor Sculpture!" program in 1994.
