= Dowell Center =

Skyscraper in Oklahoma City, Oklahoma

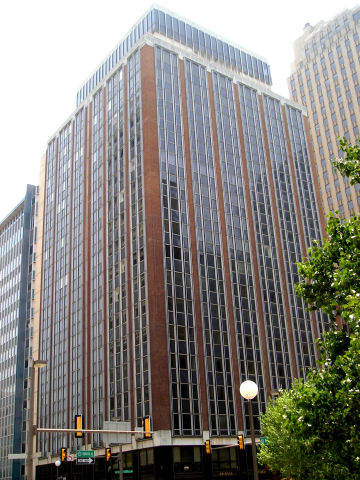
- Interactive map of the Dowell Center area

General information
- Status: Completed
- Type: Office
- Location: 134 Robert S. Kerr Avenue, Oklahoma City, Oklahoma, United States
- Coordinates: 35°28′17″N 97°31′50″W
- Opening: 1927

Height
- Roof: 243 ft (74 m)

Technical details
- Floor count: 20

Design and construction
- Architect: Layton & Forsyth
- Main contractor: J. W. Mann

The Dowell Center is a 20-story skyscraper in downtown Oklahoma City, Oklahoma. Construction on the original 18-story tower began in 1926, and was completed in 1927. The tower's footprint was doubled and two stories added in 1964 by then owner Kerr-McGee Corporation. The Dowell Center comprises more than 205,000 ft^{2} (19,045 m^{2}) and is located adjacent to Kerr Park.

== History ==
Originally planned as a ten-story structure during Oklahoma City's early century building boom by Oklahoma City general contractor J. W. Mann. Designed as the first building to appeal to Oklahoma City's oil fraternity the building the 18-story Petroleum Building broke ground in 1926 and was completed in 1927. At the time it was the tallest building in Oklahoma City. Financial difficulties developed and in 1934 ownership of the building changed through a $500,000 federal court foreclosure and was later sold to R. D. Cravens and Associates in 1946. The Petroleum Building was sold again in 1952 to Kerr-McGee Oil Co. who would rename it the Republic Building in 1953 after its tenant Republic Supply Co and use it as additional space for the oil company and other Kerr-McGee interests. In 1962 Kerr-McGee began a significant expansion of the newly christened Kermac Building that would see the structure double its east/west foot print and add 2 stories. The expansion reportedly cost $4 million and took 2 years to complete.

== See also ==
- List of tallest buildings in Oklahoma City

| Preceded by 100 Park Avenue Building | Tallest Buildings in Oklahoma City; 1927—1931; 74m | Succeeded by City Place |
