= BancFirst Tower =

Skyscraper in Oklahoma City, Oklahoma

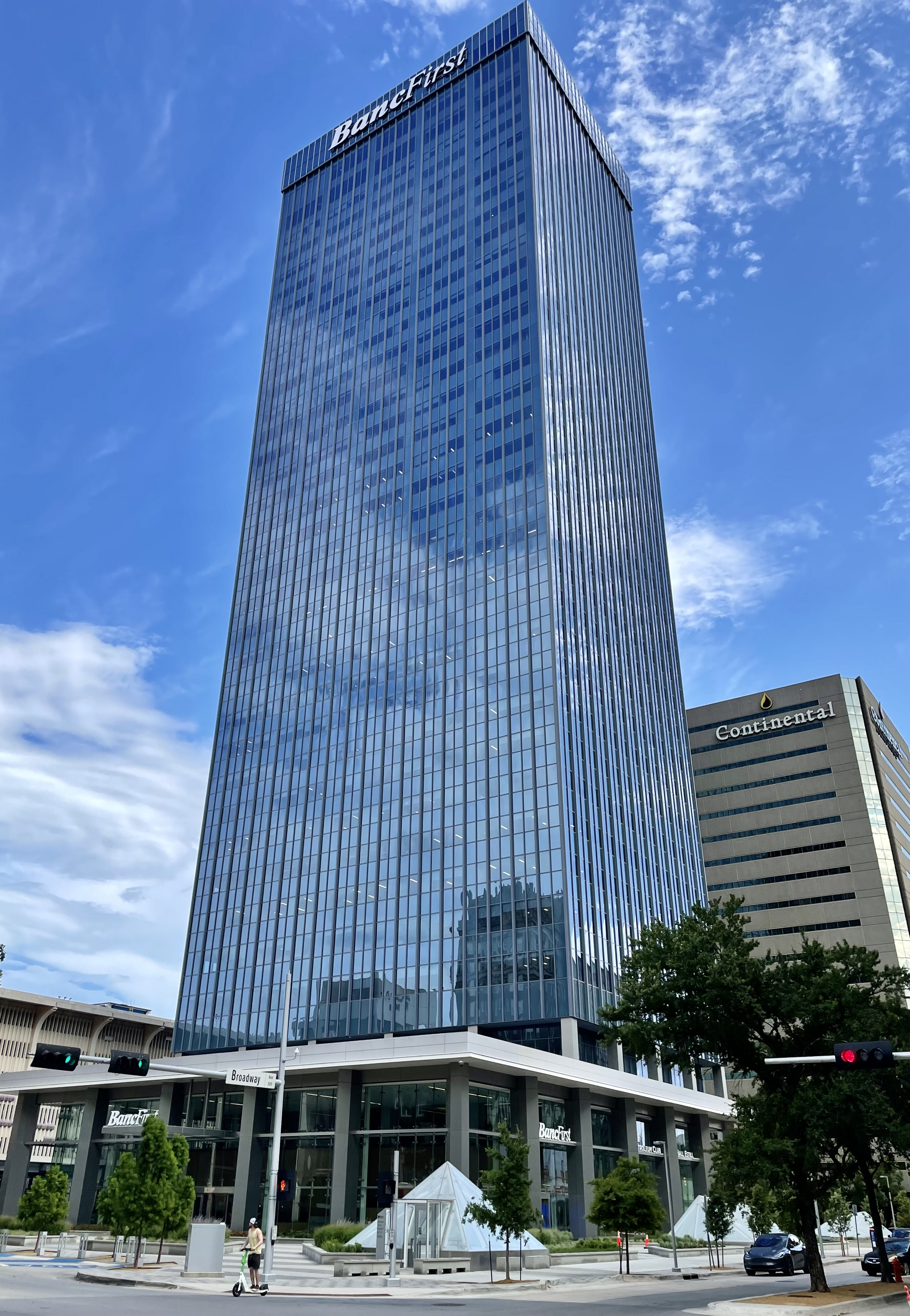
- BancFirst Tower in 2023
- Interactive map of the BancFirst Tower area

General information
- Status: Completed
- Type: Office; Communication; Restaurant/Private Club
- Location: 100 North Broadway Ave, Oklahoma City, Oklahoma, United States
- Coordinates: 35°28′05″N 97°30′50″W
- Completed: 1972
- Renovated: 2020–2023
- Owner: BancFirst

Height
- Roof: 500 ft (150 m)

Technical details
- Floor count: 36
- Floor area: 515,000 square feet (47,800 m^{2})
- Lifts/elevators: 10

BancFirst Tower, is a signature office skyscraper in the downtown area of Oklahoma City, Oklahoma, United States. At 152.4 meters (500 feet), it is the second tallest building in the city and the sixth tallest in the state of Oklahoma.

Previously known as Liberty Tower (the name it had upon completion), Bank One Tower then Chase Tower (BankOne later merging into JP Morgan, Chase), and most recently Cotter Ranch Tower/Cotter Tower, after real estate holdings owner James Cotter of San Antonio, Texas.

== History ==
Located at 100 North Broadway Avenue, the 36-floor skyscraper was completed in 1971 for Liberty National Bank and Trust Company, once one of Oklahoma City's largest banks. Liberty Bank was purchased by Bank One in 1997. After the bank's acquisition by Bank One, the tower displayed the Bank One logo. Chase held the naming rights for the building and the building displayed the Chase logo before the building was purchased by BancFirst. Presently, the building displays the BancFirst logo.

The anchor of the USS Oklahoma, salvaged after the battleship was sunk at Pearl Harbor on December 7, 1941, was located on the Park Avenue median between Chase Tower and the Skirvin Hilton Hotel until it was moved to its current location at 12th Street and Broadway. The USS Oklahoma was second in casualties only to the USS Arizona on the day of the attack.

7,437 interior lighting fixtures were upgraded in May 2001. The tower was acquired by Cotter Ranch Properties in 2004.

In 2016, Tyler Toney of Dude Perfect set the Guinness World Record for the world's highest basketball shot from the roof of the tower.

In the summer of 2018 the building was bought by BancFirst for $21 million after being placed in bankruptcy receivership. Following the acquisition of the tower, it was extensively renovated due to the lack of maintenance the previous owners neglected to provide. The renovations began in 2020 and consisted of a major overhaul to the plaza and lobby along with the building’s facade being completely replaced by bright blue glass. According to BancFirst CEO David Harlow, “… We’ll basically have a brand-new building when we are done.” The renovation of BancFirst Tower and the surrounding plaza was completed in 2023.

== Tenants ==
- Anadarko Minerals, Inc. (AMI)
- Anderson McCoy & Orta Attorneys at Law
- BancFirst Headquarters
- Business Aircraft Title International, Inc. (BATI)
- Fellers Snider Attorneys at Law
- Globe Life Insurance
- Hall Estill Attorneys at Law
- Mesa Natural Gas Solutions
- JPMorgan Chase Financial Services
- Morgan Stanley Financial Services
- National Aircraft Finance Association (NAFA)

In addition to hosting other prominent Oklahoma City businesses, the building is home to The Petroleum Club of Oklahoma City, which hosts meetings of Rotary Club Chapter 29, the fourth largest private club in the world.

A transmission tower on the roof offers Sprint Broadband Direct fixed wireless internet service to customers within a 35-mile radius of the tower. Sprint Broadband Direct stopped accepting new customers in Oklahoma City in 2001, before briefly starting again in 2005. Sprint officially terminated services on June 30, 2008.

== Gallery ==
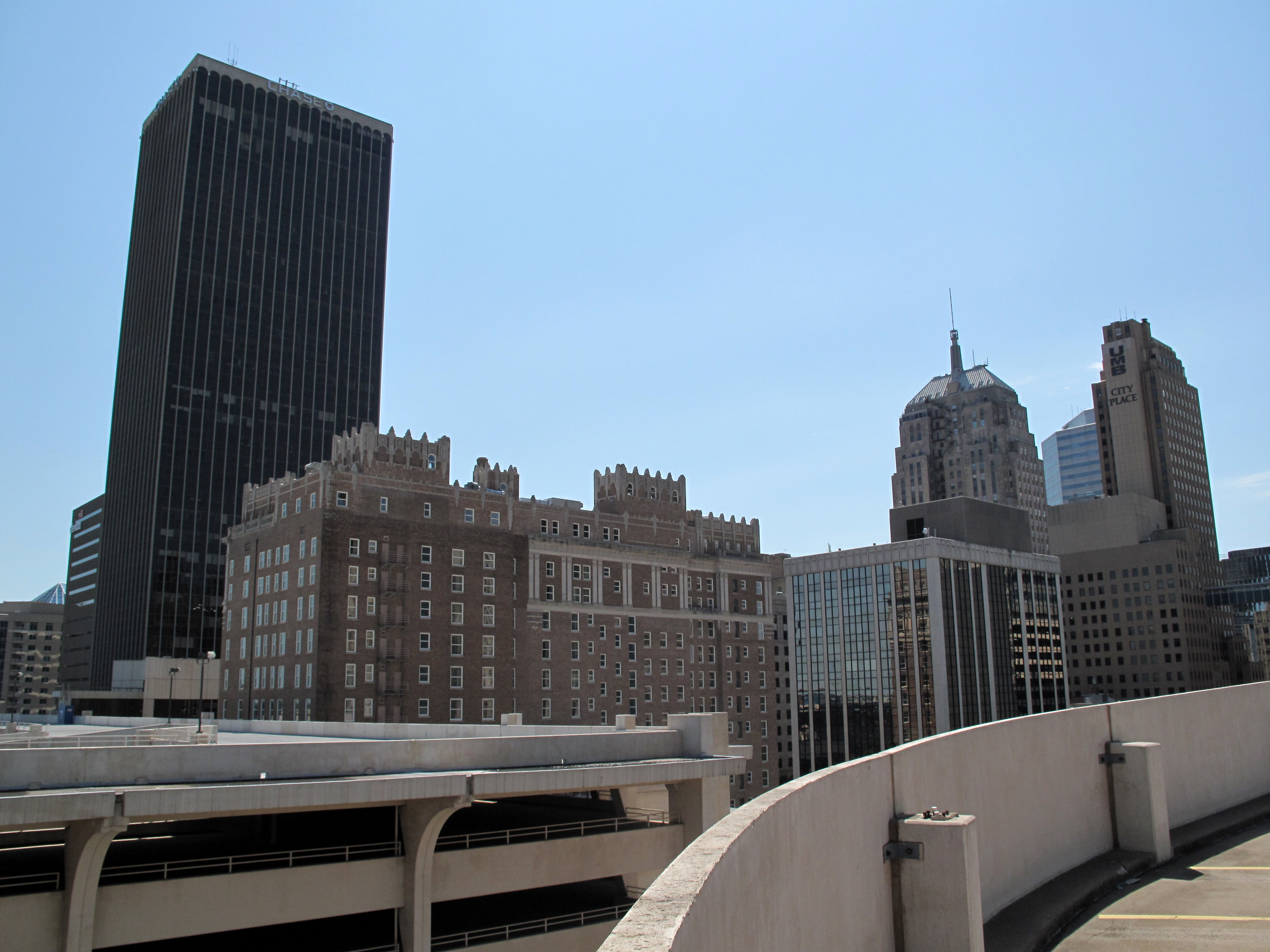
BancFirst Tower with Skirvin hotel and City Place Tower August 2009

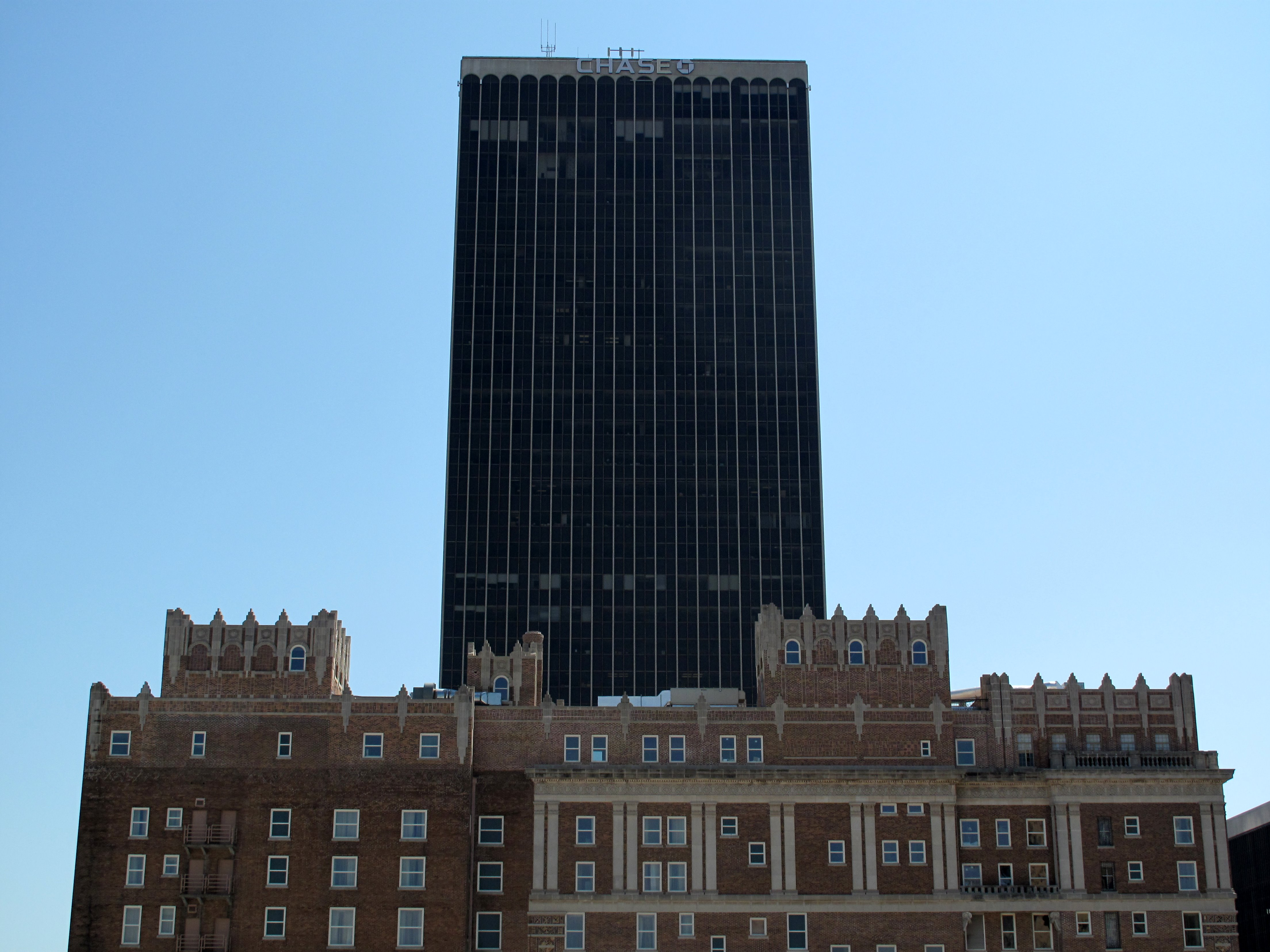
BancFirst Tower

== See also ==
- List of tallest buildings in Oklahoma City

Preceded by First National Center	Tallest Building in Oklahoma City; 1971—2011; 152m	Succeeded by Devon Tower
