= Regency Tower =

Skyscraper in Oklahoma City, Oklahoma

The Regency
- Regency Tower
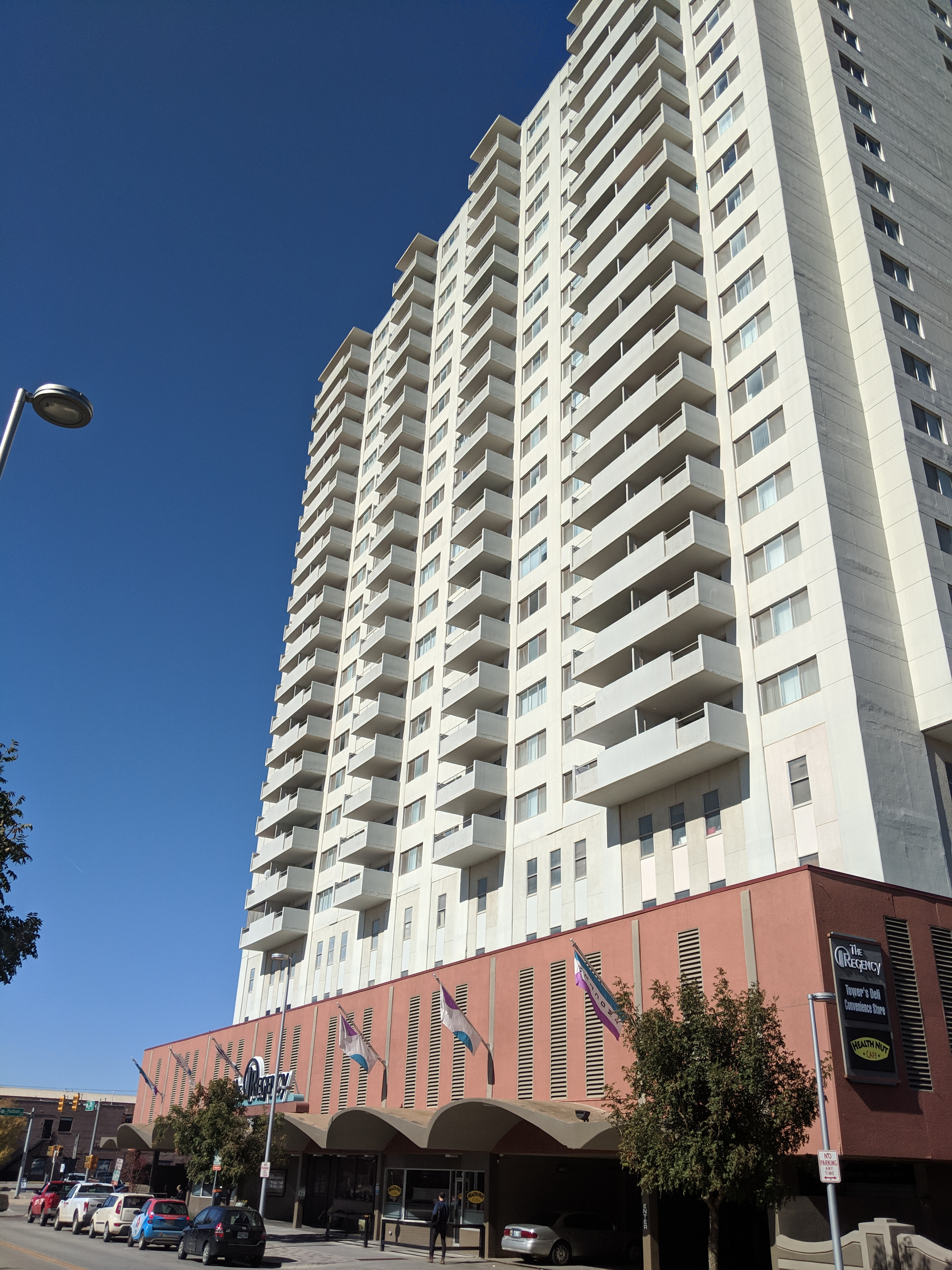
- Interactive map of the The Regency area

General information
- Status: Completed
- Type: Residential
- Location: 333 Northwest 5th Street, Oklahoma City, Oklahoma, United States
- Coordinates: 35°28′23″N 97°31′07″W
- Opening: 1967

Height
- Roof: 238 ft (73 m)

Technical details
- Floor count: 24
- Lifts/elevators: 5

Website
- www.theregencyapartmentsokc.com

The Regency (formerly known as the Regency Tower and Oklahoma Continental Apartments) is a 24-story residential building located at 333 Northwest 5th Street, in the northwest section of Downtown Oklahoma City, Oklahoma. The building is 238 feet tall and contains 274 apartments. Construction of the building began in 1964 and was completed in 1966, and subsequently opened in 1967.

The pedestal contains a 4-level parking garage with single and tandem spaces on floors B (basement), and 1–3. Floor 1 also contains the lobby with concierge desk and leasing office, as well as two retail spaces (Tower Deli and an empty space formerly occupied by Health Nut Café). Floor 4 (top of the pedestal) contains the club house (with kitchen, lounge, TV, and pool table), outdoor pool, fitness center, and leasable office spaces. Floor 5 contains the mail room, laundry room, and maintenance offices. Floors 6-24 are residential. There are studio, one bedroom, two bedroom, and three bedroom units. Most units have outdoor balconies, though some studio units do not.

== History ==
The location of the tower being roughly one city block from the bombing of the Alfred P. Murrah Federal Building led to a severe impact which proved the integrity of the structure. Aside from broken glass, internal ceiling and wall damage, and a few injuries to residents the building was deemed structurally sound and residents were able to return just months after one of the largest terrorist bombings in American history.

Residents began moving back into the tower on 2 October 1995. It was officially reopened on 26 October 1995 following repairs which reportedly cost $5 million.

== See also ==
- List of tallest buildings in Oklahoma City
