= List of tallest buildings in Oklahoma City =

Skyline of Oklahoma City
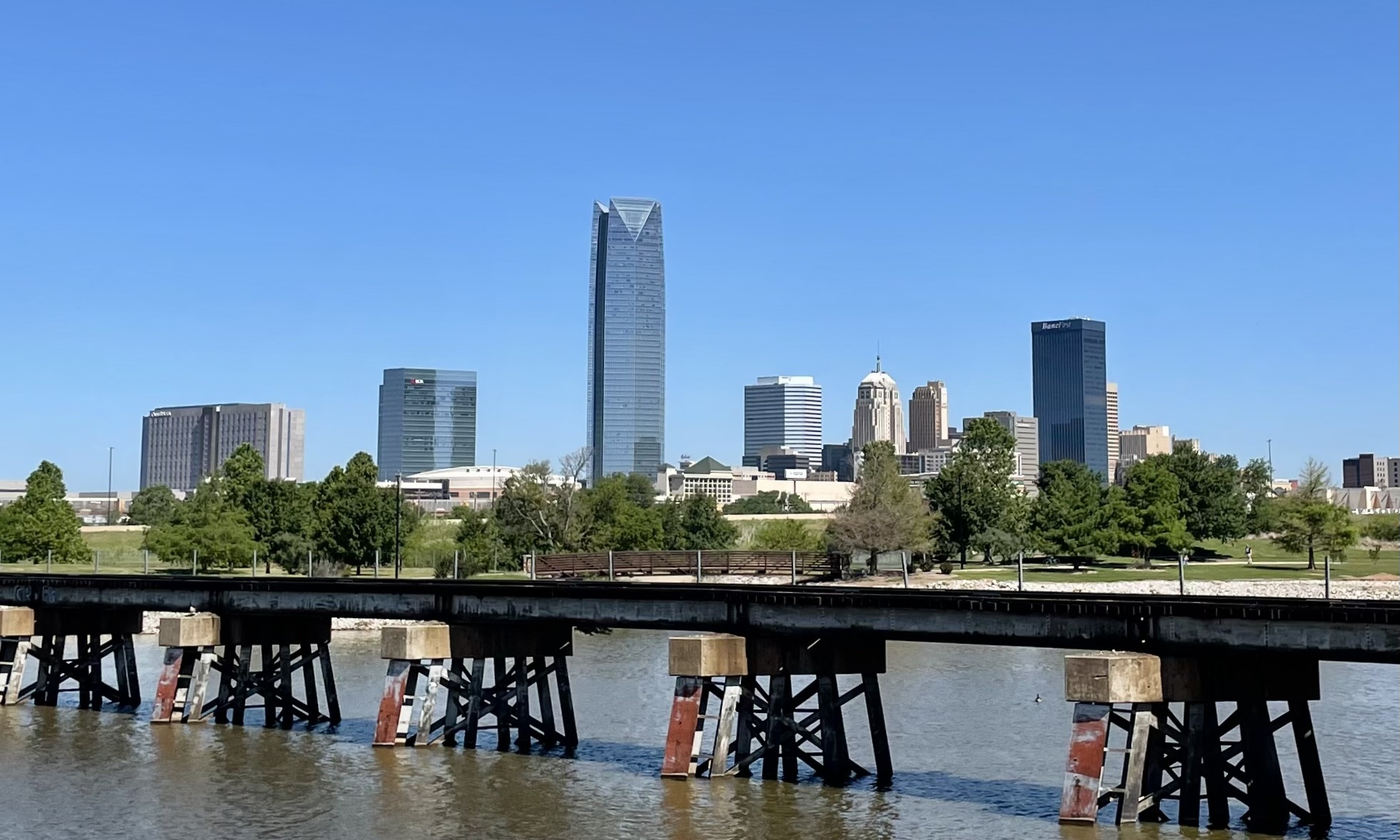
- Oklahoma City in 2024
- Tallest building: Devon Energy Center (2012)
- Tallest building height: 844 ft (257.2 m)
- First 150 m+ building: BancFirst Tower (1971)

Number of tall buildings (2026)
- Taller than 100 m (328 ft): 7
- Taller than 150 m (492 ft): 2
- Taller than 200 m (656 ft): 1

Number of tall buildings — feet
- Taller than 200 ft (61.0 m): 26
- Taller than 300 ft (91.4 m): 8

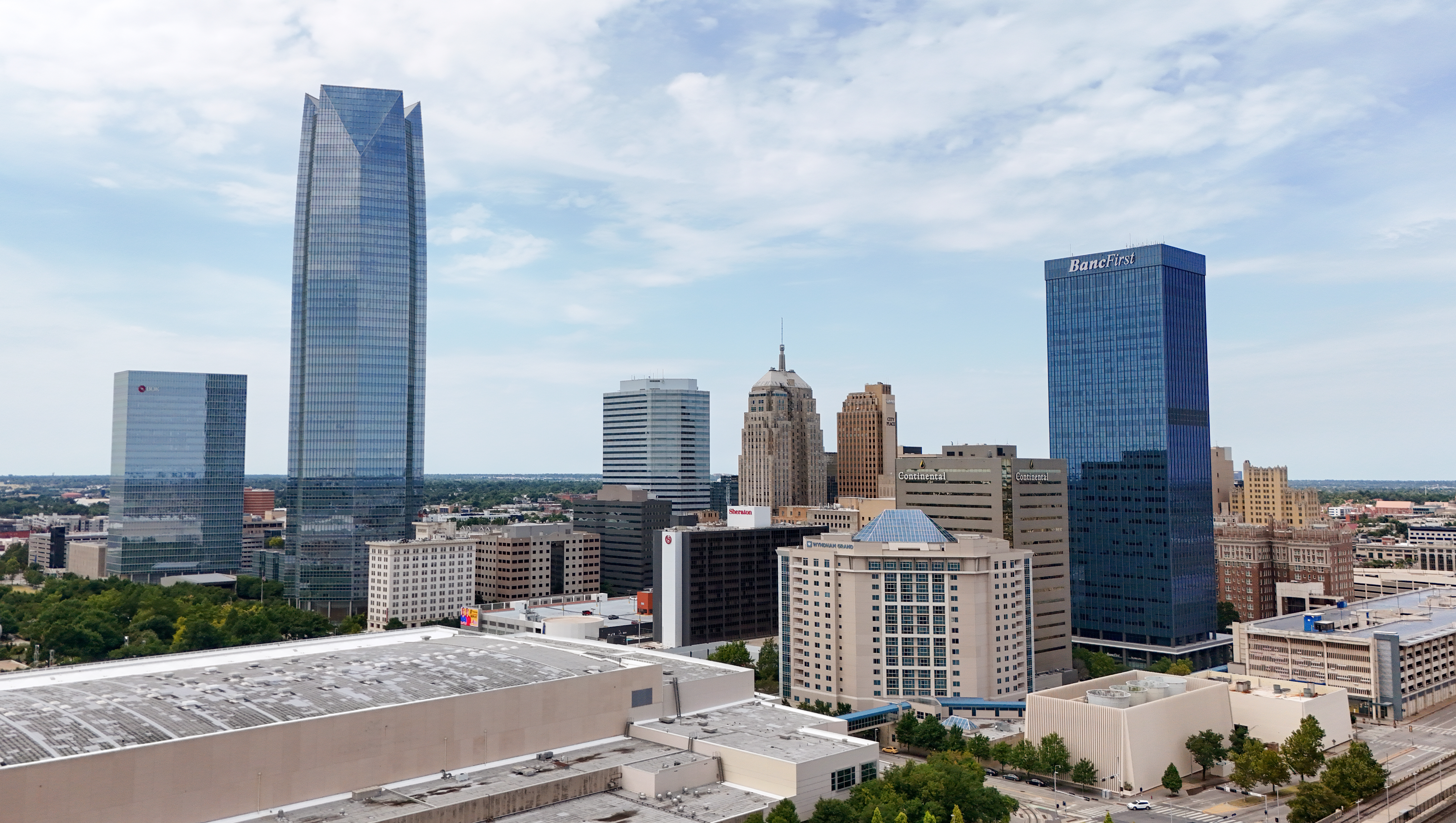
Downtown Oklahoma City from a drone in 2024

Oklahoma City is the capital and largest city of the U.S. state of Oklahoma. There are over 40 completed high-rises in Oklahoma City. 26 buildings reach a height of 200 feet (61 m) as of 2026, seven of which are taller than 300 feet (91 m). On these metrics, Oklahoma City ranks as the second largest skyline in the state, behind Tulsa. The Oklahoma City skyline is dominated by the Devon Energy Center, which rises 844 feet (257 m) and was built in 2012. Built as the headquarters of petroleum company Devon Energy, (Note: Devon Energy has since moved its headquarters to Houston in 2026.) the skyscraper reflects Oklahoma City's role in the oil industry. The 50-story building is the tallest in the state. It occupies over 1,800,000 square feet (170,000 m^{2}) and had an estimated construction cost of $750 million. Devon Energy Center is considerably taller than the city's second tallest building, BancFirst Tower, being 344 ft (105 m) taller.

The history of skyscrapers in Oklahoma City begins with the 14-story Colcord Hotel, which was built in 1909. After oil was discovered in the area in the 1920s, the population of Oklahoma City grew significantly. As a result, the city's skyline expanded, which featured a "race to the top" with the synchronous construction of First National Center and City Place Tower in downtown. Both buildings were built in 1931. Following a pause beginning with the Great Depression, high-rise construction resumed in the 1950s. The 18-story Gold Star Memorial Building of Oklahoma City University was completed in 1954.

From the 1960s to the mid-1980s, Oklahoma City's skyline expanded significantly. The 1960s saw the construction of two notable residential high-rises outside of downtown: The Classen and the Googie-style Founders Tower. The BancFirst Tower was completed in 1971, becoming the city's tallest building at 500 ft (152 m). Other commercial developments during this period include the Oklahoma Tower and the Leadership Square complex. In 1993, Oklahoma City voters approved the MAPS (Metropolitan Area Projects) program, which featured the construction of several distinct domestic facilities and restorations and expansions of other older ones. It was completed in 2004 and is deemed to be the first program of its kind for a city the size of Oklahoma City. Two major skyscrapers were added to the skyline in the 2010s, these being Devon Energy Center in 2012 and BOK Park Plaza in 2017.

Most of the city's tallest buildings stand in Downtown Oklahoma City, the city's central business district, which is north of Scissortail Park and Interstate 40. A few buildings taller than 200 ft (61 m) can be found northwest of downtown around the Northwest Expressway, including the 22-story Valliance Tower, the tallest building in the city outside of downtown. Oklahoma City and Tulsa make up the majority of the tallest buildings in Oklahoma.

== History ==
Number of buildings by height in Oklahoma City by the end of each year, based on the information in this article. This takes into account the addition of the dome of the Oklahoma State Capitol in 2002. Click on the legend to toggle a specific height on or off. View chart definition.

== Map of tallest buildings ==
The map below shows the location of buildings taller than 200 ft (61 m) in Downtown Oklahoma City. Each marker is numbered by the building's height rank, and colored by the decade of its completion.

Buildings taller than 200 ft (61 m) in Oklahoma City. An asterisk (*) next to the building's name indicates it is located outside the map.
- 1950s and before
- 1960s
- 1970s
- 1980s
- 1990s
- 2000s
- 2010s
- 2020s
1 Devon Energy Center
2 BancFirst Tower
3 First National Center
4 BOK Park Plaza
5 Oklahoma Tower
6 Strata Tower
7 City Place Tower
8 Valliance Tower*
9 The Classen*
10 Leadership Square North
11 Arvest Tower
12 Founders Tower*
13 50 Penn Place*
14 Gold Star Memorial Library*
15 AT&T Annex
16 Continental Oil Center
17 Oklahoma State Capitol*
18 Union Plaza*
19 Dowell Center
20 Regency Tower
21 AT&T Building
22 Leadership Square South
23 Omni Oklahoma City Hotel
24 Corporate Tower
25 American Assurance Fidelity Corporate Office*
26 Wyndham Grand Hotel

== Tallest buildings ==
This list ranks completed buildings in Oklahoma City that stand at least 200 ft (61 m) tall as of 2026, based on standard height measurement. This includes spires and architectural details but does not include antenna masts. The “Year” column indicates the year of completion. Buildings tied in height are sorted by year of completion with earlier buildings ranked first, and then alphabetically.

Was the tallest building in Oklahoma City upon completion

| Rank | Name | Image | Location | Height ft (m) | Floors | Year | Purpose | Notes |
|---|---|---|---|---|---|---|---|---|
| 1 | Devon Energy Center | | 35°28′01″N 97°31′03″W | 844 (257.2) | 52 | 2012 | Office | Topped out on September 21, 2011. Tallest building in Oklahoma and tallest building in the Great Plains states, between Chicago and Dallas. Tallest building completed in Oklahoma City in the 2010s. |
| 2 | BancFirst Tower | | 35°28′05″N 97°30′50″W | 500 (152.4) | 36 | 1971 | Office | Tallest building in Oklahoma City for 40 years from 1971 to 2011; sixth-tallest in the state of Oklahoma. Built as Liberty Tower; also formerly known as Bank One Tower, Chase Tower, and Cotter Ranch Tower. Renovated from 2020 to 2023, replacing the facade with blue glass. |
| 3 | First National Center | | 35°28′07″N 97°30′58″W | 443 (135) | 33 | 1931 | Mixed-use | Seventh-tallest building in Oklahoma. Tallest building in Oklahoma and Oklahoma City from 1931 to 1971. Tallest building completed in Oklahoma City in the 1930s. Originally an office building. It was converted into a mixed-use hotel and residential building in 2022. |
| 4 | BOK Park Plaza | | 35°28′01″N 97°31′12″W | 433 (132) | 27 | 2017 | Office | Topped out in early 2017. The new home to Oklahoma City's Bank of Oklahoma offices. |
| 5 | Oklahoma Tower | | 35°28′07″N 97°31′02″W | 410 (125) | 31 | 1982 | Office | Formally known as Two Galleria. Tallest building completed in Oklahoma City in the 1980s. |
| 6 | Strata Tower | | 35°28′13″N 97°30′55″W | 393 (119.8) | 30 | 1973 | Office | Home office of the Oklahoma State Department of Health. Former corporate headquarters of Kerr-McGee and SandRidge Energy Corporation. |
| 7 | City Place Tower | | 35°28′09″N 97°30′58″W | 391 (119.2) | 33 | 1931 | Office | Tallest building in Oklahoma City for a brief period in 1931. |
| 8 | Valliance Tower | | 35°31′23″N 97°32′21″W | 322 (98) | 22 | 1983 | Office | Tallest building in Oklahoma City located outside the central business district. Headquarters of Valliance Bank. |
| 9 | The Classen | | 35°29′31″N 97°31′51″W | 287 (87.5) | 21 | 1967 | Residential | Tallest all-residential building in Oklahoma City, formerly an office building known as Citizen's Tower. Its design was inspired by Frank Lloyd Wright's Price Tower in Bartlesville. Tallest building completed in Oklahoma City in the 1960s. |
| 10 | Leadership Square North | | 35°28′11″N 97°31′02″W | 285 (86.9) | 21 | 1984 | Office | Part of the Leadership Square complex. Also known as One Leadership Square. |
| 11 | Arvest Tower | | 35°28′14″N 97°31′01″W | 281 (85.7) | 17 | 1972 | Office | Formerly known as Bank of Oklahoma Plaza and Bank of America Center. |
| 12 | Union Plaza | | 35°31′36″N 97°34′10″W | 276 (84) | 18 | 1982 | Office | |
| 13 | Founders Tower | | 35°31′53″N 97°34′16″W | 275 (83.8) | 20 | 1963 | Residential | Second tallest all-residential building in Oklahoma City. Formerly an office building for United Founders Life Insurance. Also formerly known as The 360 at Founders Plaza. An example of mid-century modern architecture. |
| 14 | 50 Penn Place | | 35°31′19″N 97°32′45″W | 268 (81.7) | 16 | 1973 | Office | |
| 15 | Gold Star Memorial Library | | 35°29′39″N 97°32′31″W | 264 (80.5) | 18 | 1954 | Education | Part of the Oklahoma City University campus. Tallest building completed in Oklahoma City in the 1950s. |
| 16 | AT&T Annex | | 35°28′16″N 97°30′54″W | 263 (80.2) | 15 | 1968 | Office | The 1965 building was built as a 9-story expansion next door to Southwestern Bell Telephone's location at 405 N. Broadway (the current AT&T Building). In 1968, six more stories were added on top of the 1965 building bringing it to 15 stories. Another 15-story addition was built adjacent to the 1965 building in 1977. |
| 17 | Continental Oil Center | | 35°28′03″N 97°30′51″W | 262 (79.9) | 19 | 1981 | Office | World headquarters of petroleum and natural gas company Continental Resources. Also known as Mid America Tower. |
| 18 | Oklahoma State Capitol | | 35°29′32″N 97°30′12″W | 255 (77.7) | 5 | 1917 | Government | The state capitol was originally built without its planned dome, at a height of approximately 100 ft (30 m). In 2002, a 155-foot (47 m) dome was constructed above the roof with a 17-foot (5 m) tall bronze Native American statue on top of the dome. |
| 19 | Dowell Center | | 35°28′10″N 97°30′58″W | 242 (73.8) | 20 | 1927 | Office | Originally built as an 18-story building at a height of 210 ft (61 m). Tallest building in Oklahoma City from 1927 to 1928. The building's footprint was doubled and two more floors were added in 1964, bringing it to its current height. |
| 20 | Regency Tower | | 35°28′24″N 97°31′08″W | 238 (72.5) | 24 | 1966 | Residential | Third tallest all-residential building in Oklahoma City. Was impacted and closed for a few months after the bombing of the Alfred P. Murrah Federal Building on April 19, 1995. |
| 21 | AT&T Building | | 35°28′16″N 97°30′53″W | 236 (72) | 16 | 1928 | Data center | Built as the Southwestern Bell Telephone Building. Tallest building in Oklahoma City from 1928 to 1931. |
| 22 | Leadership Square South | | 35°28′09″N 97°31′02″W | 224 (68.3) | 16 | 1984 | Office | Part of the Leadership Square complex. Also known as Two Leadership Square. |
| 23 | Omni Oklahoma City Hotel | | 35°27′43″N 97°30′56″W | 214 (65.2) | 17 | 2021 | Hotel | Largest hotel in Oklahoma City, containing 605 rooms. |
| 24 | Corporate Tower | | 35°28′05″N 97°31′01″W | 208 (63.4) | 14 | 1980 | Office | Originally known as One Galleria upon completion. |
| 25 | American Assurance Fidelity | | | 208 (63.4) | 12 | 1991 | Office | |
| 26 | Wyndham Grand Hotel | | 35°28′01″N 97°30′50″W | 200 (61) | 15 | 2000 | Hotel | Formerly known as Renaissance Oklahoma City Hotel. Rebranded as a Wyndham hotel in 2021. |

== Tallest under construction or proposed ==
=== Under construction ===
As of 2026, there are no buildings planned to be taller than 200 ft (61 m) that are under construction in Oklahoma City. The most recent building constructed taller than that height is the Omni Oklahoma City Hotel, which was completed in 2021.

=== Proposed ===
The following table includes approved and proposed buildings in Oklahoma City that are expected to be at least 200 ft (61 m) tall as of 2026, based on standard height measurement. The “Year” column indicates the expected year of completion. A dash “–“ indicates information about the building’s height, floor count, or year of completion is unknown or has not been released.

| Name | Height ft (m) | Floors | Year | Purpose | Status | Notes |
|---|---|---|---|---|---|---|
| Legends Tower | 1,907 (581) | 136 | 2030 | Mixed-use | Proposed | Mixed-use hotel and residential proposal. Would be by far the tallest building in Oklahoma City if completed, and the tallest building in the United States. |

== Timeline of tallest buildings ==
This table lists buildings that once held the title of tallest building in Oklahoma City.

| Name | Image | Street address | Years as tallest | Height ft (m) | Floors | Notes |
|---|---|---|---|---|---|---|
| Colcord Hotel | | 15 North Robinson Avenue | 1909–1923 | 145 (44.2) | 14 | |
| 100 Park Avenue Building | | 100 Park Avenue | 1923–1927 | 160 (48.8) | 12 | |
| Dowell Center | | 134 Robert S. Kerr | 1927–1928 | 210 (64) | 18 | Height was later extended. |
| Southwestern Bell Telephone Building | | 405 N Broadway | 1928–1931 | 237 (72.2) | 16 | |
| City Place Tower | | 204 North Robinson Avenue | 1931 | 391 (119.2) | 33 | |
| First National Center | | 120 North Robinson Avenue | 1931–1971 | 446 (136) | 33 | |
| BancFirst Tower | | 100 North Broadway Avenue | 1971–2011 | 500 (152.4) | 36 | |
| Devon Energy World Headquarters | | 333 W Sheridan Ave | 2011–present | 845 (257.6) | 52 | |

== See also ==
- List of tallest buildings in Oklahoma
- List of tallest buildings in the United States
- List of tallest buildings
