= Founders Tower (Oklahoma City) =

Skyscraper in Oklahoma City, Oklahoma

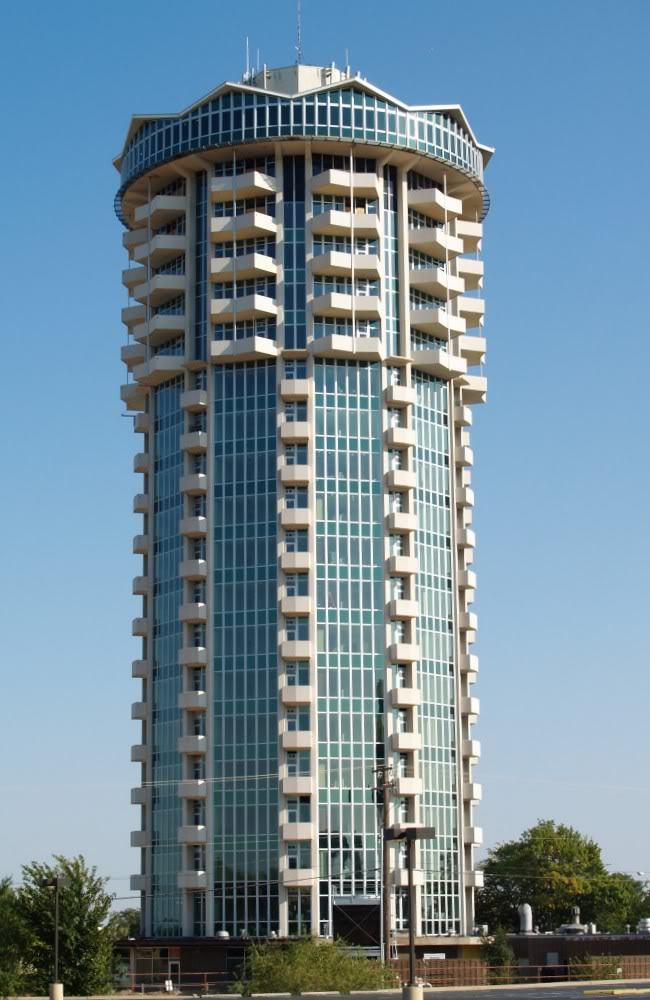
- Former names: United Founders Life Tower; The 360 at Founders Plaza

General information
- Type: Residential
- Architectural style: Googie
- Location: 5900 Mosteller Dr., Oklahoma City, Oklahoma
- Coordinates: 35°31′53″N 97°34′17″W
- Construction started: 1962
- Completed: 1964
- Renovated: 2007–2008

Height
- Roof: 275 ft (84 m)

Technical details
- Floor count: 20
- Floor area: 178,000 ft^{2} (17,000 m^{2})
- Lifts/elevators: 4

Design and construction
- Architects: Hudgins, Thompson, Ball & Associates

U.S. National Register of Historic Places
- Official name: United Founders Life Tower
- Designated: April 15, 2013
- Reference no.: 13000076

Founders Tower (formerly known as the United Founders Life Tower and The 360 at Founders Plaza) is a Googie-style residential skyscraper located northwest of downtown Oklahoma City in Oklahoma, United States. The tower is one of the most well-known landmarks in the city skyline. It has a height of 275 feet (84 m) and 20 stories, with a restaurant called 360 on its top floor, featuring 360-degree panoramic views of Oklahoma City.

Founders Tower was the second building in the nation to have a revolving restaurant—the first being at the Space Needle, though the restaurant no longer revolves. The building was originally finished in 1964 as an office building but was redeveloped into upscale residences. It was listed on the National Register of Historic Places in 2013.

== Architecture ==
Founders Tower consists of a 275-foot (84 m), cylindrical tower. From the ground floor to the 19th floor, the building has a diameter of 92 feet (28 m), which expands to 108 feet (33 m) at the 20th. Small, cantilever balconies are located at the vertices of each of the buildings ten faces from the 3rd floor to the 14th; wider balconies protrude from each face from the 15th to the 19th floor. Founders Tower contains a total of 63 condominiums: four each on floors 3 through 17, one that takes up the entire 18th floor, and two penthouses on the 19th. Unusual for a skyscraper is its "folded plate" concrete roof, rather thin-shell concrete. In addition to creating the distinctive zigzag pattern of the building's crown, it enabled the 20th floor to be free of load-bearing columns. The 20th floor includes the tower's restaurant space, which houses The George Prime Steakhouse as of 2013. The restaurant no longer revolves.

The design of Founders Tower is representative of the Googie, also called "Populuxe", architectural style prevalent at a time when much of the United States was enamored with spaceflight. It was also largely influenced by the Frank Lloyd Wright-designed Price Tower in Bartlesville, Oklahoma and the Space Needle in Seattle, Washington. Because the available offices in Founders Tower "were small, awkward—and shaped like slices of pie" as a consequence of its circular design, it could have only been used for "small, low-rent" offices That layout and the presence of balconies, something that was irrelevant in an office setting, made it suitable, however, as a residential building.

== History ==
The United Founders Life Tower was built by the real estate development arm of the United Founders Life Insurance Corporation. In addition to being the primary tenants of the skyscraper, the company expected to profit from the development of the mostly rural land surrounding the tower. When it was completed in 1964, the Founders Tower was the first skyscraper to be built in Oklahoma City outside of downtown. Its relatively isolated location in northwestern Oklahoma City and its unusual design spurred the development of the area. At the time the Space Needle inaugurated the first revolving restaurant in the United States at the World's Fair in Seattle, the design of Founders Tower was the first one changed to incorporate its own revolving restaurant in the United States. Founders Tower is one of only three office buildings in the U.S. to include a revolving restaurant.

It was purchased by 1978 by Northwest Investors Limited for $15.5 million; Northwest Investors also received a $5.8 million loaned at the same time. The building was sold in 1981 for $11.1 million to California-based National Capitol Real Estate Trust in 1981, with Northwest Investors retaining 25 percent ownership. The building was certified as a nuclear fallout shelter by the United States Army Corps of Engineers in 1983. United Founders foreclosed on Founders Tower in 1986 after National Capitol defaulted on loan payments for the remaining $4.92 million. It was sold at sheriff's sale on November 5, 1986 to the Protective Life Insurance Corporation, the parent company of United Founders. The tower was sold on April 24, 1989 to the U.S.–Swedish investment group, Growth Fund International Limited for $2.5 million. In 1996, Founders Tower was sold to Hebron Corporation, a subsidiary of the long-distance calling provider AmeriVision, for $3.3 million.

In 2005, Founders Tower was purchased, along with 7.5 acres (3.0 ha) of surrounding land, for $4.6 million by the Bridgeport Development Group. The next year, a $50 million renovation, to convert the office building into condominiums and to reverse the 15 years of neglect from the constant buying-and-selling by out-of-state investors, was announced. At the same time, the building was renamed "The 360 at Founders Plaza", a reference to the view from the building and its revolving restaurant. During the renovations from 2007 to 2008, the building's original, darkly-tinted, glass panes were replaced with modern, energy-efficient, turquoise-colored glass. The building's name was returned to Founders Tower in January 2010. It was listed on the National Register of Historic Places on April 15, 2013.

== See also ==
- List of tallest buildings in Oklahoma City
- List of revolving restaurants
- National Register of Historic Places listings in Oklahoma County, Oklahoma

== Sources ==
- McQuillin, Steven (March 13, 2013). "United Founders Life Tower" (PDF). National Register of Historic Places Registration Form. National Park Service.
