= BancFirst =

Oklahoma-based bank

BancFirst Corporation
- Type: Public
- Traded as: Nasdaq: BANF; Russell 2000 Component; S&P 600 Component
- Industry: Financial services
- Founded: 1966; 60 years ago
- Headquarters: Oklahoma City, Oklahoma, U.S.
- Key people: David Rainbolt, chairman David Harlow, CEO
- Products: Banking
- Revenue: ▲US$908.7M (FY 2024)
- Net income: ▲US$216.4M (FY 2024)
- Total assets: ▲US$13.6B (FY 2024)
- Total equity: ▲US$1.6B (FY 2024)
- Number of employees: 2135
- Website: www.bancfirst.bank

BancFirst Corporation is an Oklahoma-based financial services holding company. The company operates three subsidiary banks, BancFirst, an Oklahoma state-chartered bank; and Pegasus Bank and Worthington Bank, both Texas state-chartered banks.

== History ==
The roots of BancFirst date back to 1966, when lead investor and Chairman H.E. "Gene" Rainbolt purchased Federal National Bank in Shawnee, Oklahoma. Federal National had $16 million in assets at the time of purchase. Throughout the 1970s, Rainbolt acquired interests in many rural Oklahoma banks and formed Thunderbird Financial Corporation to assist each bank with management services. In 1985, Rainbolt's banks in seven communities were brought under the ownership of United Community Corporation.

On April 1, 1989, BancFirst was formed and established its corporate headquarters in downtown Oklahoma City. Changes in Oklahoma's banking laws that allowed multiple banks to merge in such a fashion were largely due to Rainbolt's efforts to modernize the law.

David Rainbolt became CEO in 1992, and took the company public in 1993 through an initial public offering; BancFirst began trading on the NASDAQ under stock symbol BANF. David Rainbolt became chairman in 2017 after having led the bank through more than 37 bank acquisitions over the years. David Harlow is currently CEO of BancFirst Corporation.

== Currently ==
BancFirst operates in 65 Oklahoma communities in 35 of 77 counties, with over 110 service locations. The bank has a network of more than 250 ATMs across the state, including in all Oklahoma Walgreens and Costco stores.

BancFirst's recognitions include:

- Ranked by Bank Director Magazine as one of the safest and strongest banks in the nation for 20 consecutive years.
- Ranked by Newsweek as one of America's Best Banks and Credit Unions of 2026.

BancFirst Corporation's recognitions include:

- For the 14th consecutive year, BancFirst was included on the KBW Bank Honor Roll. Keefe, Bruyette & Woods, Inc., is a full‐service, boutique investment bank that names U.S. banking institutions to its coveted “Bank Honor Roll” of superior performers every year.
- Listed #8 in American Banker's top-performing banks in 2025.

As of October 23, 2026 BancFirst Corporation's assets totaled $15 billion while the bank's deposits totaled $12.7 billion.
