= Colcord Hotel =

Hotel in Oklahoma City, Oklahoma

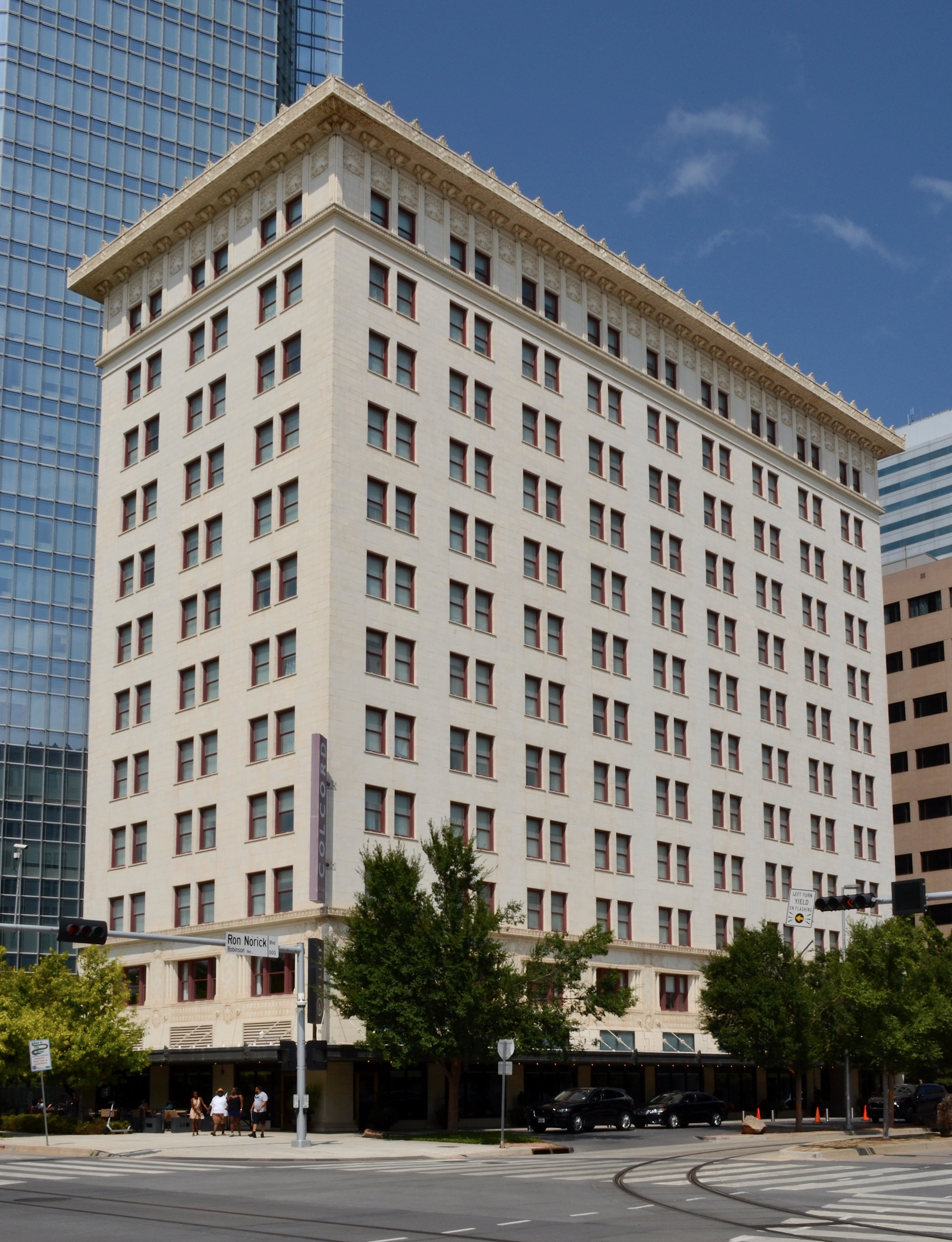
- Viewed from the southeast in 2021
- Interactive map of the Colcord Hotel area

General information
- Status: Completed
- Type: Hotel; Restaurant
- Location: 15 North Robinson Avenue, Oklahoma City, Oklahoma, U.S.
- Coordinates: 35°28′00″N 97°31′00″W
- Opening: 1909, 2006 (redevelopment)
- Cost: $16 million (redevelopment)
- Owner: Devon Energy Corporation
- Management: Coury Hospitality

Height
- Roof: 145 ft (44 m)

Technical details
- Floor count: 14
- Floor area: 9,217 m^{2} (99,210 sq ft)
- Lifts/elevators: 6

Design and construction
- Architects: William Wells; Paul M. Coury (redevelopment)
- Developer: Charles Colcord
- Main contractor: Manhattan Construction Company (redevelopment)

Colcord Hotel is a luxury boutique hotel located in downtown Oklahoma City, in the U.S. state of Oklahoma. The building was finished in 1909 and has been considered Oklahoma City's first skyscraper. It is 145 feet (44 m) tall and has 14 floors.

Originally an office tower developed by Charles Colcord, the building was renovated by Coury Hospitality and reopened as a luxury hotel in 2006. Colcord Hotel is a member of Historic Hotels of America, the official program of the National Trust for Historic Preservation.

== History ==
Colcord built the Colcord Building, now known as the Colcord Hotel, which was the first skyscraper in Oklahoma City. It was also the first steel-reinforced concrete building in Oklahoma, because Colcord had seen the devastation to lesser buildings in San Francisco following the 1906 San Francisco earthquake and resulting fires. Originally designed with two wings, only the east wing and connecting elevator/stair segment were constructed. Architect William A. Wells was a protégé of Louis Sullivan, a founder of the Chicago School style of architecture. Sullivan designed the molds for the decorative terra cotta ornamentation on the first, second, and twelfth floors of the Colcord.[20] The building survived Oklahoma City's Urban Renewal efforts and is listed on the National Register of Historic Places. Developer Paul Coury, with the help of investors including Beck Design and Manhattan Construction, has transformed the office building into a boutique hotel adjacent to the state's tallest building, the new 51 story, 274 metres/900 feet Devon Tower. The Colcord Building is now owned by Devon Energy. Colcord also built the Commerce Exchange Building and the Biltmore Hotel.

== Architecture ==
When the Colcord Building was completed in 1910, at 12 stories, it was the first skyscraper in Oklahoma City. It was constructed by Charles Francis Colcord, who chose William A. Wells as the architect. Wells was a protégé of Louis Sullivan, a founder of the Chicago School style of architecture. Sullivan was also the designer of the molds for the decorative terra cotta, which adorns the first, second, and twelfth floors of the Colcord Building.

The building was constructed of reinforced concrete after Colcord witnessed terrible devastation associated with the San Francisco earthquake and resulting fires in 1906. He wanted to avoid the same catastrophic loss of his building. Every luxury of the time was incorporated in the construction. Marble adorned the columns and walls of the main lobby, the original nickel and bronze letterbox and elevator doors shone, and an ornamental plaster ceiling crowned the space. The landmark building was listed on the National Register of Historic Places on November 7, 1976.

== See also ==
- List of tallest buildings in Oklahoma City

Preceded by Incumbent	Tallest Buildings in Oklahoma City; 1909—1923; 44m	Succeeded by 100 Park Avenue Building
