= Oklahoma City Bus Station =

Intercity bus station in Oklahoma City, Oklahoma

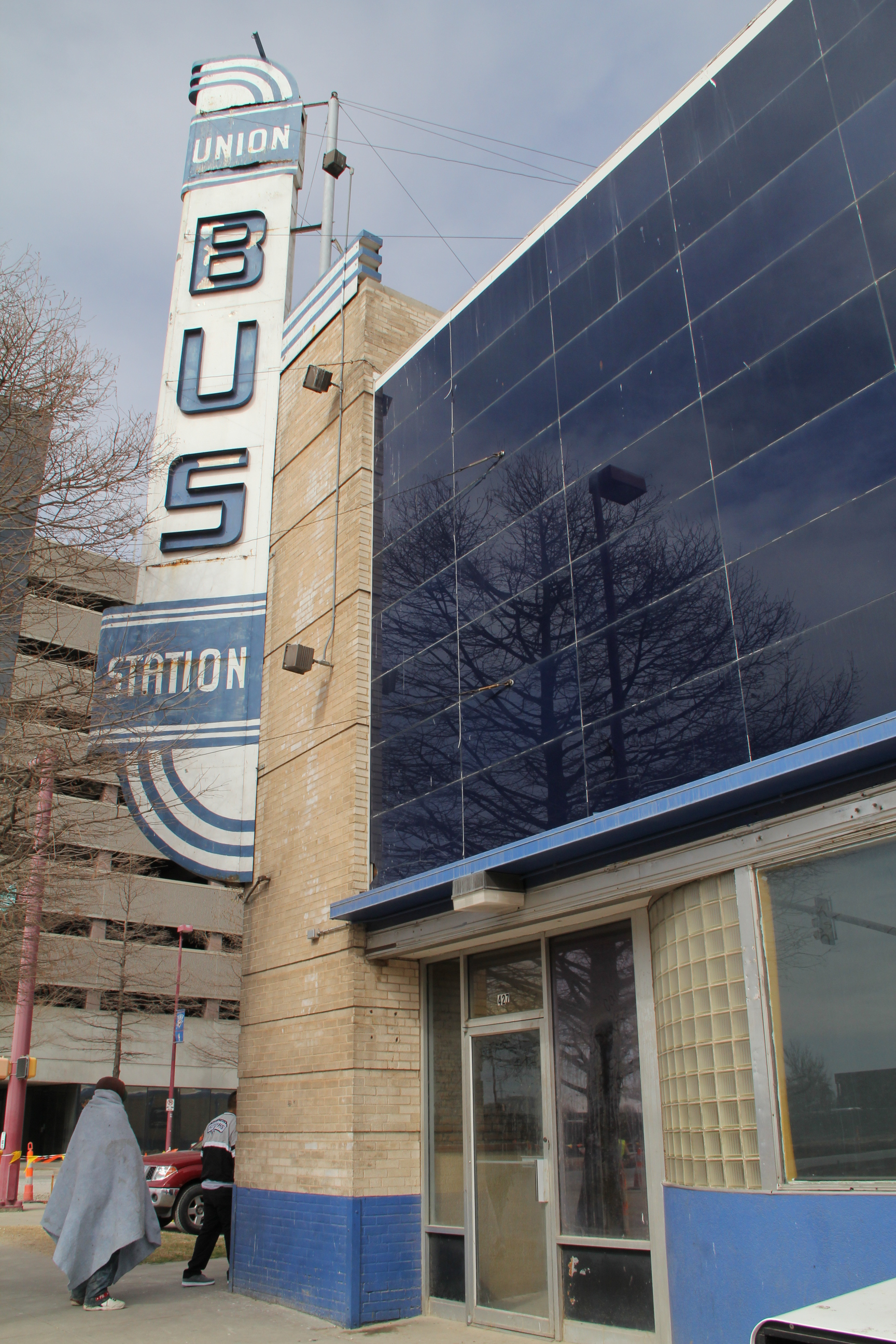
- The former bus station in 2012

General information
- Location: 1948 E Reno Ave, Oklahoma City, Oklahoma
- Coordinates: 35.463732°N 97.477301°W
- Operator: Greyhound Lines
- Bus stands: 5
- Bus operators: Greyhound Lines; Beeline Express
- Connections: Embark 22

Other information
- Website: Official website

History
- Opened: March 22, 1941
- Rebuilt: October 31, 2013

Passengers
- 1940 2012: 184,000; 75,000
Location

The Oklahoma City Bus Station is an intercity bus station situated east of downtown Oklahoma City, Oklahoma. The station, managed by Greyhound Lines, also serves the Beeline Express. The current building was repurposed to a bus station in 2013.

Oklahoma City has seen intercity bus transit since at least 1928, when a union bus terminal opened at on South Santa Fe Street. Later stations included an American Buslines station on Sheridan Avenue and a new union station which continued to serve Greyhound until 2013, when bus services moved to the present location on Reno Avenue.

== Attributes ==
The Greyhound station building sits at the southwest corner of East Reno Avenue and North Martin Luther King Avenue east of downtown Oklahoma City. The main entrance is located on Reno Avenue. The bus station is managed by Greyhound Lines, but also serves Beeline Express with five bus stands.

== History ==
=== Early stations ===
The first bus station in Oklahoma City and the state of Oklahoma opened June 9, 1928 at northwest corner of California Avenue and Santa Fe Avenue. Between 13 and 16 bus operators would serve the station with 45 departures and an estimated 1,200 passengers daily. The two story structure cost between $70,000 to $75,000 and contained office space for the bus companies on the second floor.

However, this station would soon be outgrown, and a new union station was planned for the corner of Walker Avenue and Grand Avenue. The new station began construction in September 1940 at a cost of $100,000. This location, now at 427 West Sheridan Avenue, would measure 50 by 140 feet and include a coffee shop, concession stand, baggage room, waiting room, and ticket office. Eight bus lines would use the terminal, serving the 184,000 passengers that the former station saw in 1940. These operators were the Southwestern Greyhound Lines, Oklahoma Transportation Co., Missouri, Kansas & Oklahoma Transportation Co., Red Ball Transportation Co., Santa Fe Trailways, Texas & Oklahoma Stages, Southwest Trailways, and Panhandle Trailways. While originally planned to open in December 1940, this was pushed back to March 22, 1941, when a grand opening ceremony was held with music and entertainment throughout the day.

Less notable stations in this time period included an American Buslines station at 400 West Sheridan Avenue and a Trailways station at 15 South Santa Fe Street. However, neither of these stations lasted as long as the Union Bus Station at 427 West Sheridan Avenue.

=== Current station ===
By the 2010s, the union bus station saw 26 daily departures, a significant decline from the 80 daily departures it saw at the time of its 1941 opening. It also now only served two carriers, Greyhound Lines and Jefferson Lines. With the redevelopment of this part of downtown, the station was sold to Nicholas Preftakes in 2012 for $2 million. Greyhound would continue to lease the station until a new station could be constructed.

In order to be close to Interstate 40, Greyhound originally chose the JRS Travel Center site, at 1901 East Reno Avenue, with plans to move in November 2011. However, this site could not be secured, so a smaller site at 1948 East Reno Avenue was chosen. This was home to an abandoned former restaurant, but would be able to accommodate five bus bays and the necessary infrastructure to convert the building to a bus station. Construction took place in 2013, with a small opening ceremony on October 28, and bus service beginning on October 31.

As of 2025, Jefferson Lines no longer serves Oklahoma City, and Greyhound Lines and Beeline Express are the only operators.

=== Union station preservation ===
While the new owner of the former union station promised to preserve the building soon after purchasing it, by 2015 developers had submitted a plan to the city to raze the building in order to construct a 27 story office tower and two parking garages. This was approved by the city in January, however Councilmember Ed Shadid filed an appeal to prevent demolition of the streamline moderne structure. The appeal was dismissed by the Downtown Design Review Committee and so the councilmember filed a lawsuit to stop the demolition. Ultimately, this too was unsuccessful, however, the signage was saved and preserved as part of a parking garage.

== See also ==
- Oklahoma City station
