= Oklahoma Tower =

Skyscraper in downtown Oklahoma City

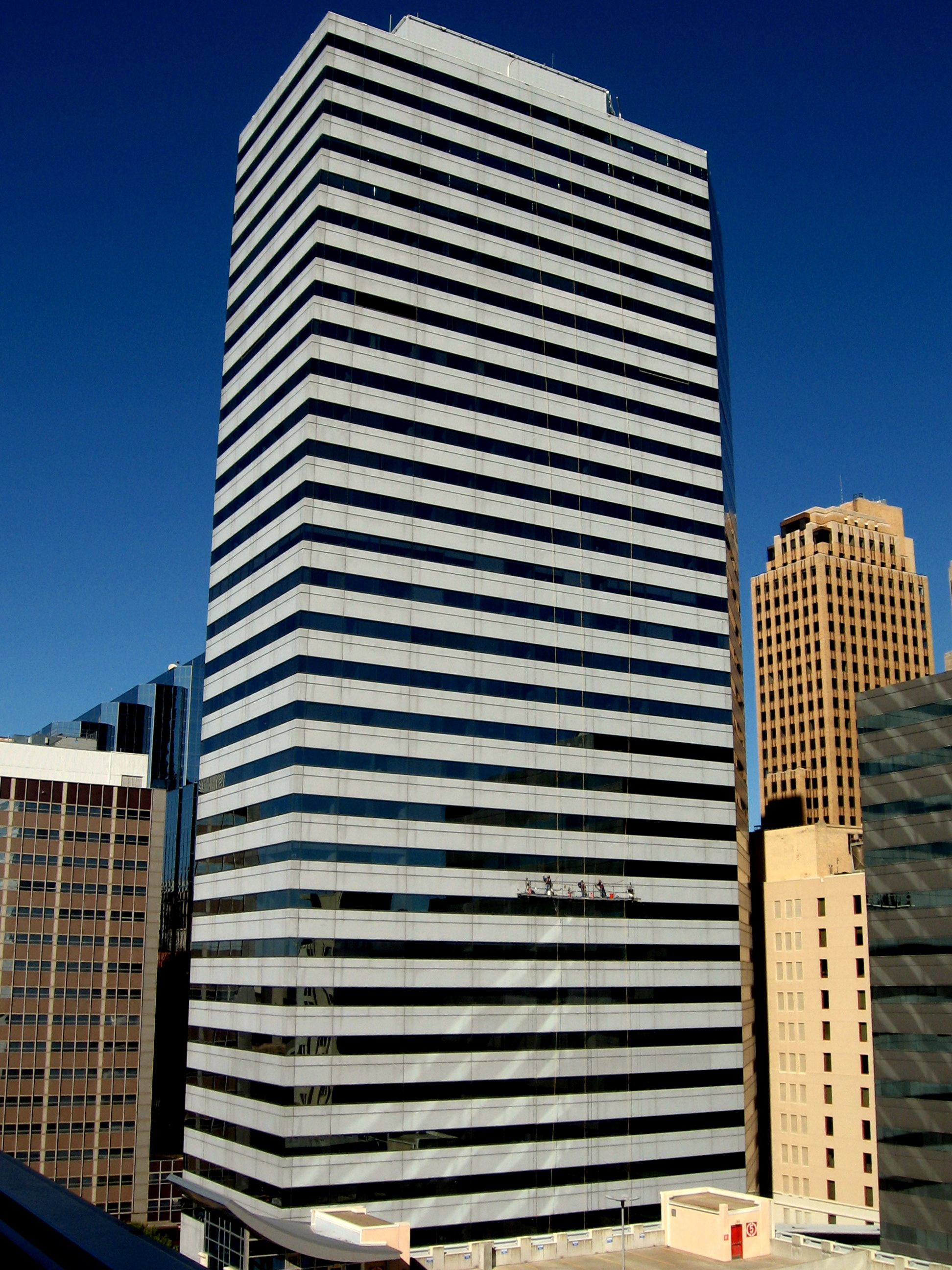
- Interactive map of the Oklahoma Tower area
- Former names: Two Galleria

General information
- Status: Completed
- Type: Office
- Location: 210 Park Avenue, Oklahoma City, Oklahoma; United States
- Coordinates: 35°28′07″N 97°30′59″W
- Opening: 1982

Height
- Roof: 410 ft (120 m)

Technical details
- Floor count: 31
- Floor area: 568,960 ft^{2}

Design and construction
- Architects: I. M. Pei & Partners

Oklahoma Tower is a prominent skyscraper in downtown Oklahoma City's central business district. It is 410 feet tall and has 31 floors. It was built in 1982 and is the fifth tallest building in Oklahoma City and 10th tallest in Oklahoma.

== History ==
The Oklahoma Tower was built in 1982 with a total commercial space of 610,375 square feet. The tower was purchased in 2005 for $30 million by owners Roy T. Oliver and Mark Beffort. In 2011 it was offered for sale with an asking price of $62.5 million.

Current amenities in the building include 24 hour availability, conferencing facility, onsite retail stores, banking, Skywalk connection to parking and several restaurants.

== Architecture ==
Architecture for the Oklahoma Tower was done by Morris-Aubry. The Morris-Aubry firm was popular during the 1980s oil boom, but the firm was later known as Morris Architects. After March 1, 2017 it became Huitt-Zollars.

== See also ==
- List of tallest buildings in Oklahoma
- List of tallest buildings in Oklahoma City
