= Omni Oklahoma City Hotel =

Hotel located in Oklahoma City, Oklahoma

- Interactive map of Omni Oklahoma City Hotel
- Location: Oklahoma City; 100 Oklahoma City Blvd; 35°27′41.668″N 97°30′55.303″W
- No. of rooms: 605
- Owner: Omni Hotels & Resorts
- Architect: Rule Joy Trammell Rubio, Bill Rooney Studio, Jeffrey Beers International
- Website: https://www.omnihotels.com/hotels/oklahoma-city

Omni Oklahoma City Hotel is an Omni Hotel in Oklahoma City, Oklahoma. It opened on January 26th, 2021, and was the first Omni Hotel in Oklahoma. The hotel has 17 floors, 605 guest rooms, 76,000 square feet of meeting space, a full-service spa, a fitness center, and a rooftop pool. The meeting space/ballrooms allow for up to 200 guests. The hotel is in Downtown Oklahoma City near Paycom Center and Scissortail Park, which can be seen from Omni’s suites.

== Food and beverage ==
There are seven restaurants and bars at Omni Oklahoma City:

- Basin Bar
- OKC Tap House
- Bob’s Steak and Chop House
- Park Grounds
- Seltzer’s
- Catbird Seat
- Double Double Burger Bar

== Awards ==
- 2024 Convention South Readers Choice Award
- 2024 Smart Meetings Smart Stars: Best City Hotel
- 2023 Smart Meetings Platinum Choice Award
- 2023 Tripadvisor Travelers’ Choice Award
- 2021 Liv Hospitality Design Awards

== See also ==
- List of tallest buildings in Oklahoma City
