= Scissortail Park =

Park in Oklahoma City

Coordinates: 35.460°N 97.518°W

Scissortail Park is a park in Oklahoma City, just south of the Myriad Gardens. It is a large interactive park.

== History ==
The northern part of the park opened in 2019, and the southern part in 2022.

== Facilities ==
This park contains a large lake with paddleboats, a dog park, a concert stage with a great lawn, a promenade including the Skydance Bridge (which connects the two sections of the park), a children's interactive splash park and playground, and numerous athletic facilities. Farmers Market is a common attraction at Scissortail Park during the season, and there are multiple film showings, food trucks, concerts, festivals, and civic gatherings.
