= Oklahoma City Underground =

Pedestrian tunnel and skyway system in Downtown Oklahoma City

The Oklahoma City Underground is a series of pedestrian tunnels and skyways connecting skyscrapers, hotels and venues in sections of Downtown Oklahoma City's central business district.

Oklahoma City Underground - 2017

== History ==
The original tunnel was dug in the early 1930s because William Balser Skirvin wanted to have an underground passage from his "Skirvin Hotel" on one side of Broadway to his new hotel, The Skirvin Towers, on the other side of Broadway. The rest of the tunnel was a result of the urban renewal of the late 1960s and early 1970s as designed by I. M. Pei, with major construction between 1972 and 1974. The tunnels were a vibrant part of the OKC landscape, including several shops and restaurants, but lost much of their popularity with the end of the last oil boom.

Originally named the Conncourse, in honor of Oklahoma City banker Jack Conn, it was renamed the Underground after an extensive facelift conducted by architect Rand Elliott. With the 2006 facelift, Rand Elliott has turned what had become a somewhat dated appearance of the old tunnels into a "walk-in work of art".
