= Layton & Forsyth =

Oklahoma architectural firm

Layton & Forsyth was a prominent Oklahoma architectural firm that also practiced as partnership including Layton Hicks & Forsyth and Layton, Smith & Forsyth. Led by Oklahoma City architect Solomon Layton, partners included George Forsyth, S. Wemyss Smith, Jewell Hicks, and James W. Hawk.

== Layton & Smith ==
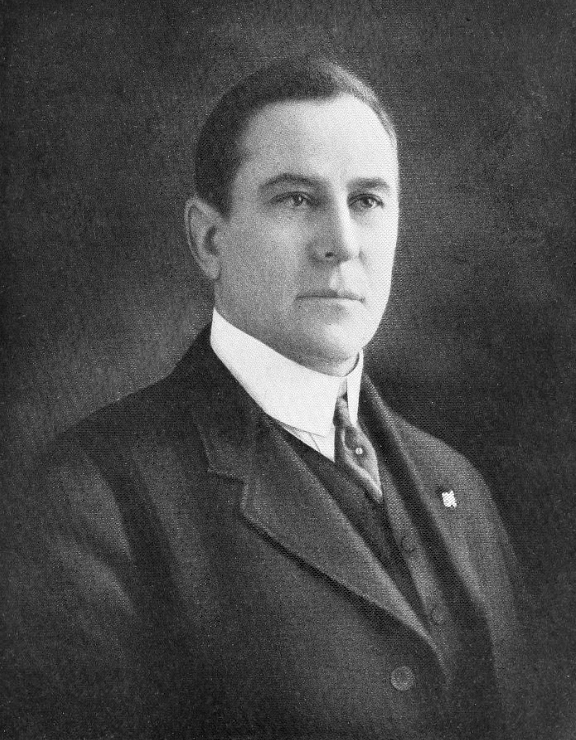
Solomon Layton

- Baum Building (1910), a building said to have been inspired by Doge's Palace in Venice, Italy, located at 131 West Grand Avenue (now Sheridan). It was demolished in 1973 to make way for a small shopping center, and several of its finials are "scattered" throughout Oklahoma City as sculptures "in parks or medians".
- El Reno High School (1911), located at 405 S. Choctaw in El Reno, Oklahoma.
- Original Oklahoma City Public Schools Administration Building (1919) at 400 N. Walnut, Oklahoma City, Oklahoma. Currently being rehabilitated for occupation by the Ryan Whaley law firm.

== Layton Smith & Hawk ==
- Odd Fellows Building, designed in 1909 and assigned building number 1313 in their portfolio. The building stood at the Southwest corner of Walker Avenue and Grand Avenue (now Sheridan Avenue) in Oklahoma City, Oklahoma.
- Old Douglass High School (1910) in Oklahoma City, designed in 1910, with later additions, added to the National Register of Historic Places (NRHP) in 2007.
- Beckham County Courthouse in Sayre, Oklahoma was designed in 1911 and added to the National Register of Historic Places (NRHP) in 1984. Said to be a blend of Neo-Classical and Second Renaissance Revival styles, it is one of the few courthouses in Oklahoma to be surmounted by a dome.

== Layton Smith & Forsyth ==
- Ponca City Hall (1917), a Spanish Colonial architecture style building at 516 E. Grand Avenue in Ponca City, Oklahoma. Two wings were added in 1923.
- Moose Lodge (1920) at 111-113 N. 2nd in Ponca City, Oklahoma, a Classical Revival architecture style that was the Ponca City Post Office, and contained "bowling lanes, a billiard room, shower area, and lounging room" and its third floor was later used for community dances were held on the 3rd floor.
- Home State Theatre, a 2,200 seat Neo-Classical architecture style building with a Byzantine architecture style interior, remodeled into a Streamline design in the 1940s, operated from 1923 to 1951. It is currently used as office space.

== Layton Hicks & Forsyth ==
- Journal Record Building (originally the India Temple Shrine Building), Oklahoma City (1923), a Classical Revival style building listed on the National Register of Historic Places in 1980. It was damaged in the 1995 Oklahoma City bombing and now houses the Oklahoma City National Memorial Museum.
- Bizzell Library, University of Oklahoma (1928), a collegiate Gothic architecture style building designed in what Frank Lloyd Wright deemed "Cherokee Gothic" at 401 West Brooks Street. Rear addition made in 1958 and Neustadt Wing built in 1982.(planned 1929)
- Broadway Tower (Enid, Oklahoma) (1931) is a 14-story Art Deco highrise listed on the National Register of Historic Places.
- Kirkpatrick Auditorium, Oklahoma City, 1928
- Taft Junior High School (1931) in Oklahoma City is an Art Deco styles building shaped like an arrowhead as a design paying tribute to Native American culture. It is located at NW 23rd and May Avenue and includes painted ceilings. It is listed in the National Register of Historic Places. Additions were made in 1940.
- Skirvin Hotel (1911) ten floors building with two towers built by William Balser Skirvin at 1 Park Avenue Park. A third tower was added in the 1920s and three additional floors in 1930. The hotel, Oklahoma City's oldest, closed in 1988, and was finally renovated and reopened in 2007.

== Layton & Forsyth ==
- Oklahoma County Courthouse (1937)
