= Solomon Andrew Layton =

American architect

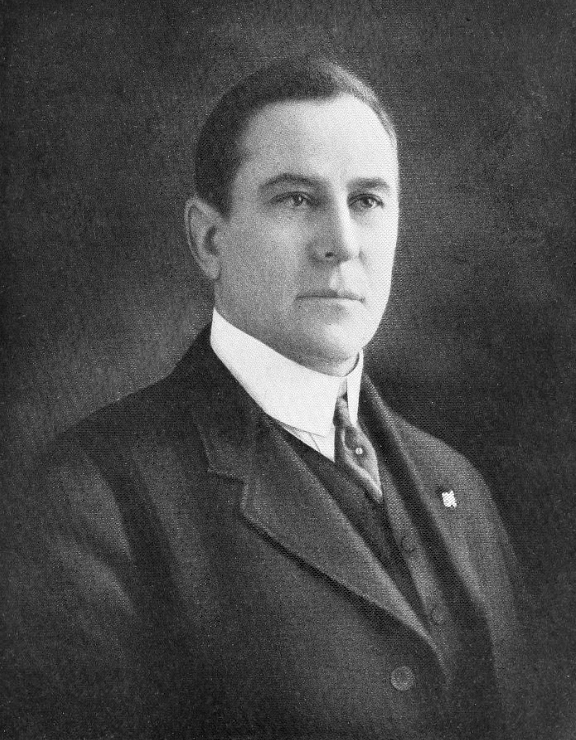
- Born: July 22, 1864; Lucas County, Iowa
- Died: February 6, 1943 (aged 78); Oklahoma City, Oklahoma
- Occupation: Architect
- Buildings: Oklahoma State Capitol; Skirvin Hilton Hotel; Oklahoma County Courthouse
- Projects: University of Oklahoma

Signature
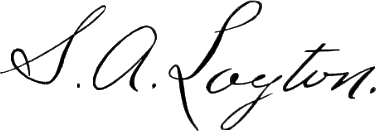

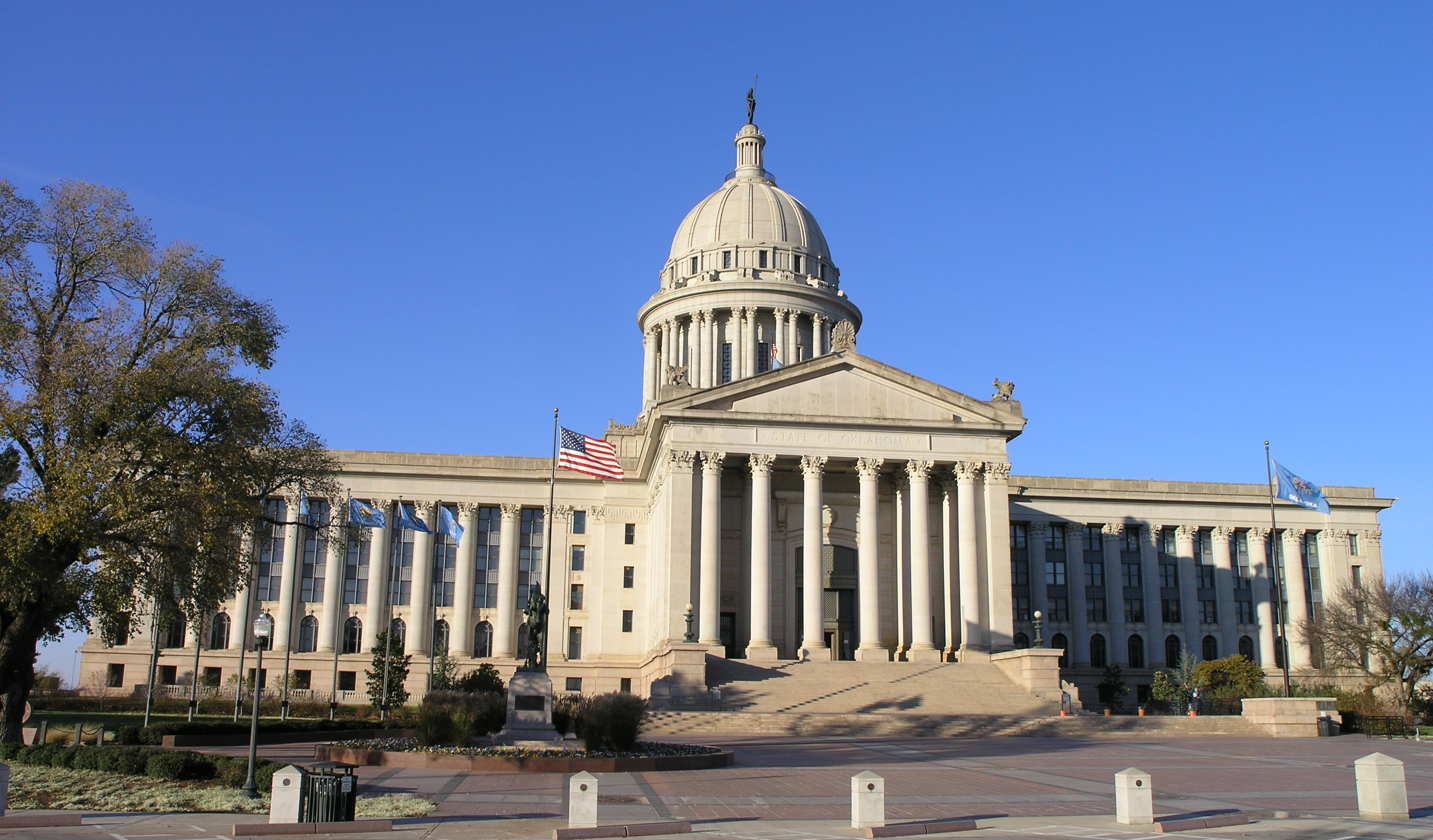
Oklahoma State Capitol, Oklahoma City, built 1914-1917

Solomon Andrew Layton (July 22, 1864 – February 6, 1943) was an American architect who designed over 100 public buildings in the Oklahoma City, Oklahoma area and was part of the Layton & Forsyth firm. Layton headed partnerships in Oklahoma from 1902 to 1943; his works included the Canadian County Jail in El Reno, Oklahoma State Capitol, sixteen Oklahoma courthouses, and several buildings on the University of Oklahoma campus. Layton had a considerable influence on the area's architecture, and he became known as the "dean of Oklahoma City architecture".

== Biography ==
Layton was born on July 22, 1864, in Lucas County, Iowa, to Andrew and Jennette Miller Layton. Most of his family was employed in carpentry or building, giving Layton early experience in building. In 1885, Layton married Alice Wood; the couple later had two daughters. Layton began practicing architecture in Denver in 1887; in 1902, he moved to El Reno, Oklahoma and began to design buildings in El Reno - Oklahoma City area, the most notable being the Canadian County Courthouse, (Note: The Canadian County Courthouse was found to be structurally unsound during 1962–1964, and was demolished.) and the Canadian County Jail. He moved to Oklahoma City in 1907. By 1911, Layton had become a recognized architect in Oklahoma City, and he bid successfully to build the Oklahoma State Capitol. He originally intended the Capitol to have a dome, but due to budgetary constraints, his vision was not realized until a dome was added to the Capitol in 2002. After the Capitol, Layton began designing skyscrapers in downtown Oklahoma City such as the Baum Building, the Medical Arts Building, and the Skirvin Hotel. During this time, Layton also designed buildings at the University of Oklahoma and Oklahoma City University. Layton died on February 6, 1943; he is buried in Rose Hill Cemetery.

== Architectural work ==
Layton designed over one hundred public buildings in Oklahoma during his career. Twenty-two of his buildings are listed on the National Register of Historic Places, an Oklahoma state record. He designed the neoclassical Oklahoma State Capitol in 1914 and created the original plans to add a dome to the building, a feature which was not installed until 2002. His works also include sixteen courthouses, including Oklahoma City's Oklahoma County Courthouse, and forty-six public schools, including the first five high schools in Oklahoma City. Layton's major projects include the campuses of the University of Oklahoma and Oklahoma City University. He designed some of the most prominent buildings on the University of Oklahoma campus, including the administration building, Bizzell Memorial Library, and Oklahoma Memorial Stadium. Several of Layton's skyscrapers still remain in Oklahoma City, including the Skirvin Hilton Hotel and the Medical Arts Building, now known as the 100 Park Avenue Building. Layton also designed the since-demolished Halliburton department store, the Patterson and Mercantile Buildings, and the Baum Building, a replica of the Doge's Palace in Venice. Eleven of Layton's buildings, including seven on the National Register of Historic Places, survived the 1995 Oklahoma City bombing.

== Projects ==
- For buildings designed by one of Layton's firms see Layton & Forsyth

- Home of E.W. Marland (1916) at 1000 East Grand Avenue in Ponca City, Oklahoma. Houses the 101 Ranch and Indian Museums and is owned by the City of Ponca City. (Not to be confused with the E. W. Marland Mansion.)
- Original Oklahoma City Public Schools Administration Building (1919) at 400 N. Walnut, Oklahoma City, Oklahoma. Currently being rehabilitated for occupation by the Ryan Whaley law firm.

== National Register of Historic Places Buildings ==
- Beckham County Courthouse, Courthouse Square in Sayre, Oklahoma (NRHP #84002968)
- Braniff Building (1923) 324 North Robinson Street in Oklahoma City (NRHP #80003281)
- Canadian County Jail 300 S. Evans in El Reno, Oklahoma (NRHP #85002790)
- Daniel J. Donahoe House 302 South 7th St. Ponca City, Oklahoma (NRHP #82003686)
- El Reno High School at 405 South Choctaw in El Reno, Oklahoma (NRHP #0000179)
- Greer County Courthouse at Courthouse Square in Mangum, Oklahoma (NRHP #85000682)
- Mid-Continent Life Building at 1400 Classen Drive in Oklahoma City (NRHP #79002009)
- Oklahoma Publishing Company Building at 500 North Broadway in Oklahoma City (NRHP # 78002249)
- Oklahoma State Capitol 22nd St. and Lincoln Blvd. Oklahoma City OK Layton, S.A. (NRHP #76001572)
- Science Hall at Northwestern Oklahoma State University in Alva, Oklahoma (NRHP #83002141)
- Taft Middle School at 2901 NW 23rd ST in Oklahoma City, Oklahoma (NRHP #07000515)

== See also ==
- Layton & Forsyth
