= Order of the Golden Bear =

Collegiate honor society in California, US

- Founded: 1900; 126 years ago University of California, Berkeley
- Type: Secret
- Affiliation: Independent
- Status: Active
- Emphasis: Service
- Scope: Local
- Colors: Blue and Gold
- Symbol: Golden Bear
- Chapters: 1
- Headquarters: Berkeley, California; United States
- Website: ogb.berkeley.edu

The Order of the Golden Bear (the Order, OGB) is an secret honor society at the University of California, Berkeley, composed of students, faculty, and alumni committed to serving the University of California.

== History ==
Founded in 1900, the Order serves as a forum for discussion, where fellows gather to exchange ideas on a variety of topics pertinent to the well-being of the campus community. Fellows are free to discuss ideas amongst themselves, but never to attribute opinions or remarks to their authors.

Despite its mystique, the order is not a traditional secret society per se, although membership is usually kept in strict confidence, and many of its traditions rival those of typical collegiate secret societies. In its earliest years, and through members like Robert Gordon Sproul, John McCone, and Clark Kerr, the order was commonly associated with the Bohemian and California Clubs.

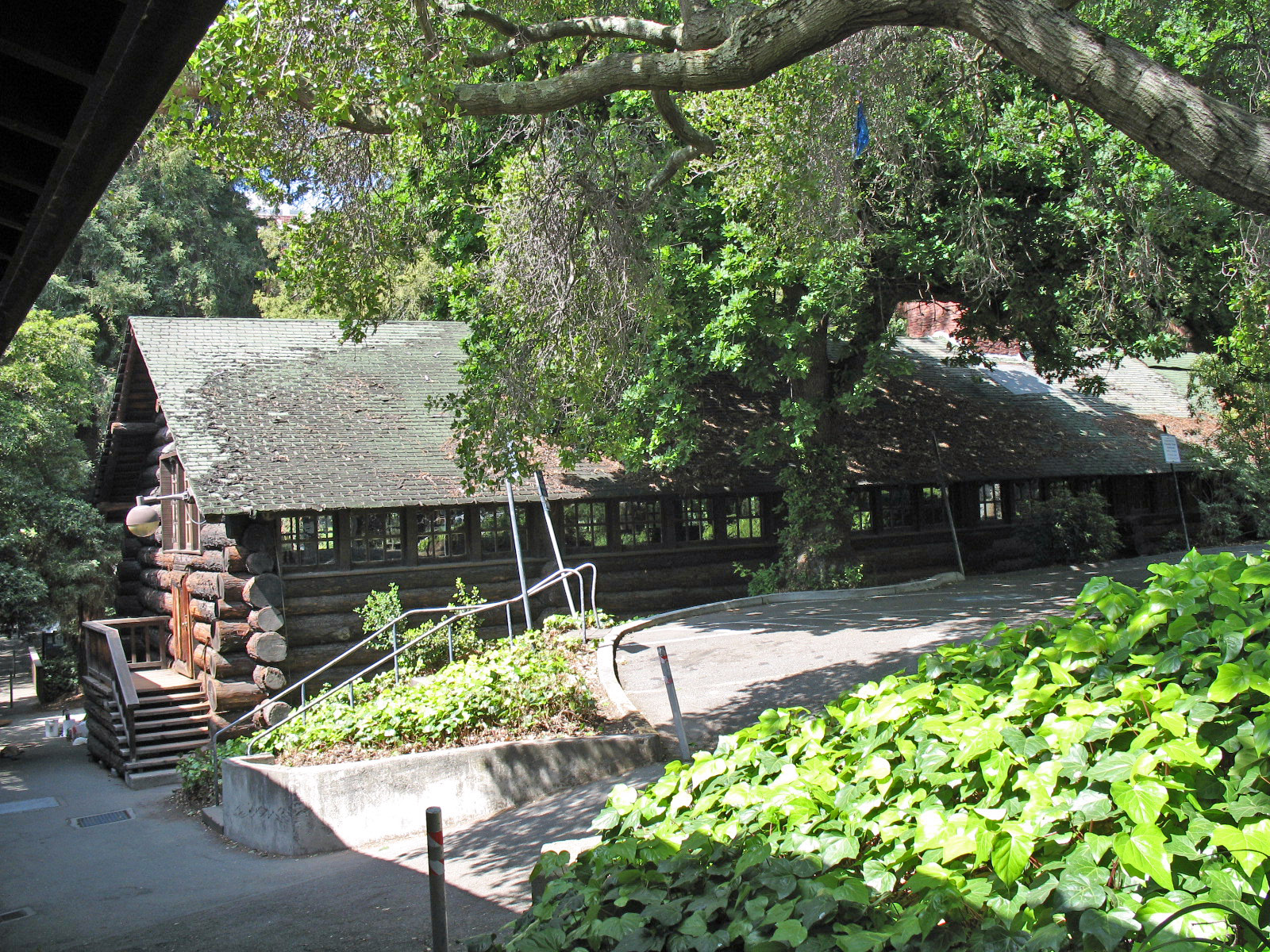
Senior Hall

Since 1906, the order has been housed in Senior Hall, a log cabin on the Berkeley campus designed by John Galen Howard. In recent years, however, the order has been forced to relocate due to building renovations.

== Activities ==
Every fall semester, the order hosts one event open to the general public during Homecoming weekend called the Arleigh Williams Forum, either featuring a prominent speaker or a panel of engaged student and faculty to discuss campus issues.

== Membership ==
Membership in the order includes influential members of the university administration, California government, and the Board of Regents. When it was founded, student membership was limited to undergraduate senior men; in 1972, this restriction was lifted and all students, with at least sophomore standing, have been eligible for fellowship.

== Notable members ==
The order's fellows have included:

- Charles Mills Gayley, English and Classics Professor, and Academic Dean of the University of California (1889-1932).
- Phoebe Apperson Hearst, philanthropist and first female UC Regent, granted honorary Order membership due to her donation to Senior Hall.
- Robert Gordon Sproul, President of the University of California, Berkeley (1930–1952) and President of the University of California (1952–1958).
- John A. McCone, Director of the CIA during the height of the Cold War (1961-1965); assisted the FBI in blacklisting Clark Kerr.
- Walter A. Haas, President of Levi Strauss & Co.
- Benjamin Ide Wheeler, President of the University of California, Berkeley (1899–1919).
- Arleigh Williams, Cal football player (1932-1934) and University administrator (1957-1976).
- Lynn O. "Pappy" Waldorf, head football coach for the California Golden Bears (1947-1956).
- Glenn T. Seaborg, Nobel laureate in chemistry and Chancellor of the University of California, Berkeley (1958-1961).
- Clark Kerr, Chancellor of the University of California, Berkeley and President of the University of California (1958–1967).
- Earl Warren, Governor of California and Chief Justice of the U.S. Supreme Court
- William Knowland, United States Senator from California (1945–1959) and Senate Majority Leader (1953–1955).
- Zoë Baird, President of the Markle Foundation.
- Robert McNamara, the 8th United States Secretary of Defense (1961–1968) and President of the World Bank Group (1968–1981).
- Leigh Steinberg, American sports agent.
- Carol T. Christ, first female Chancellor of the University of California, Berkeley (2017–2024).
- John Pérez, Chair of the Regents of the University of California (2019–present).

== See also ==
- Honor society
- Collegiate secret societies in North America
