= Central High School (Oklahoma City) =

- U.S. National Register of Historic Places
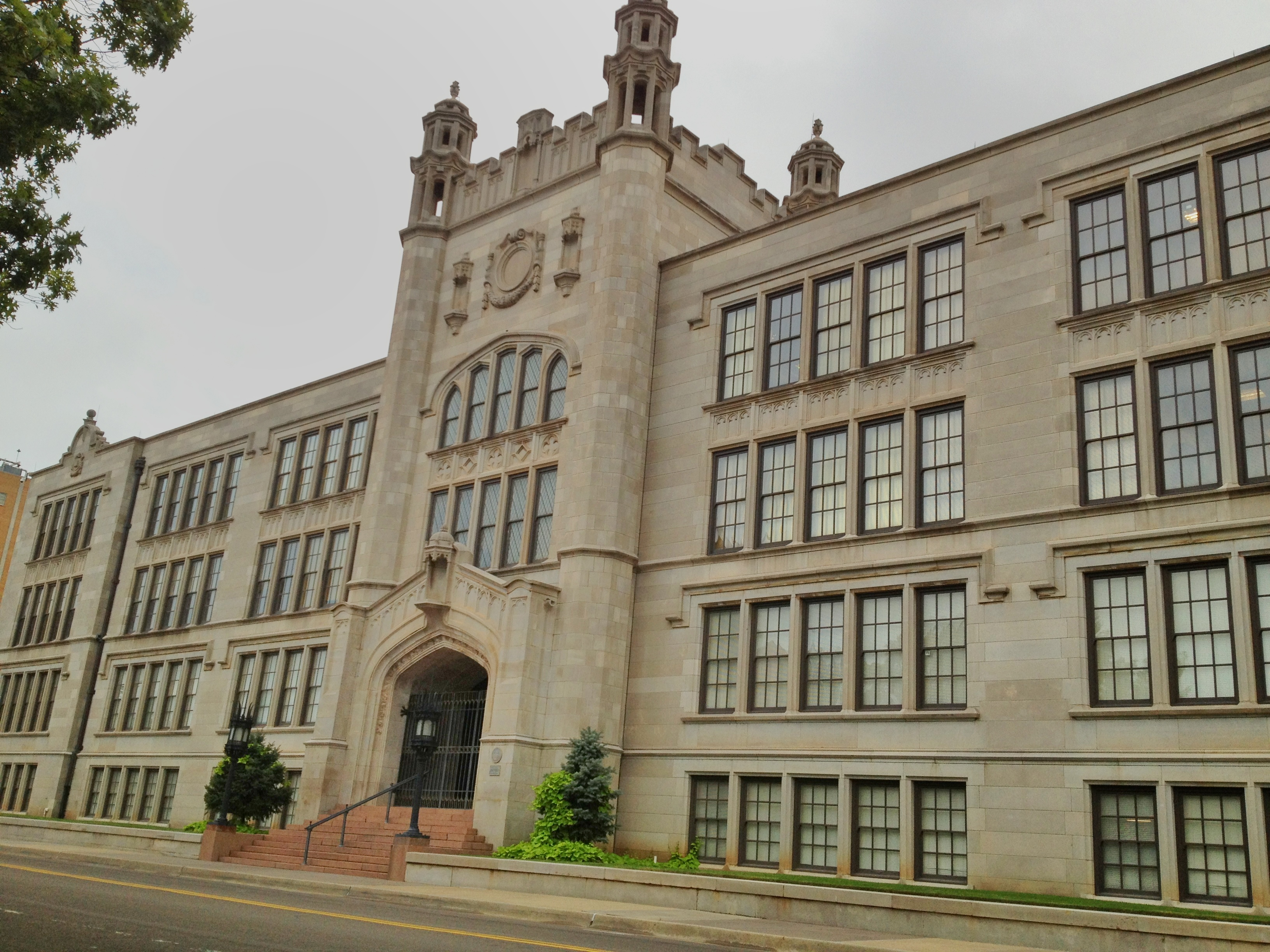
- Front view of the building, 2012
- Location: Oklahoma City, Oklahoma
- Built: 1910
- Architect: Solomon Andrew Layton
- Architectural style: Collegiate Gothic
- NRHP reference No.: 76001570
- Added to NRHP: November 7, 1976

Central High School is a historic former school building in downtown Oklahoma City, Oklahoma, designed by Solomon Andrew Layton. The school opened in 1910, and operated as a high school until 1968. The building was listed on the National Register of Historic Places in 1976. It was converted to offices in the 1980s by Southwestern Bell, who renamed it One Bell Central.

One Bell Central was damaged in the Oklahoma City bombing of 1995, which destroyed the Alfred P. Murrah Federal Building two blocks west. Following the bombing, the president of Southwestern Bell offered the building as an incident command headquarters, a role which it served in for multiple weeks during the rescue operations. Southwestern Bell vacated the building in 2005, and it was briefly owned by an insurance company before being sold to Oklahoma City University in 2012. Since 2015, the Central High School building has housed the Oklahoma City University School of Law.

== History ==
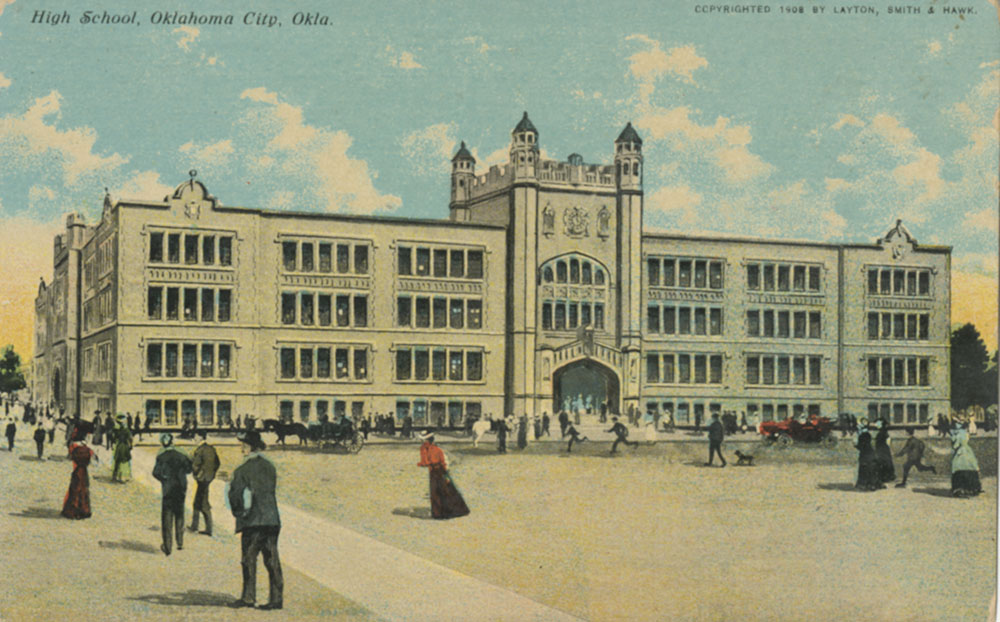
1908 postcard of the future high school

=== Construction ===
Secondary education in Oklahoma City began in the early 1890s, with the establishment of a high school in a one-room structure at 313 West California Avenue in 1892. Oklahoma High School grew rapidly, and moved out of its original building the next year. The first graduating class of six students graduated in the spring of 1895.

By the turn of the 20th century, the need for a new high school building for Oklahoma City was clear. The construction of the new high school was to be financed by a $300,000 ($8.1 million in 2024) bond issue, which was promoted by Oklahoma High School students, especially the class of 1910. Solomon Andrew Layton, a prolific architect who also designed the Oklahoma State Capitol, designed the building. The new school was built on Robinson Avenue between 7th and 8th Streets, on a site occupying half a city block.

Cost overruns raised the expenditure for the building to over $500,000, and delays in construction meant that the building was not fully complete in time for the graduation of the class of 1910. The school board insisted that the construction contractor complete the auditorium by May 1910, and the first graduation ceremony in the new building was held on May 26, 1910, for a graduating class of 72 students.

=== Operation as Central High School ===
The first classes in the new Oklahoma High School building began in the fall of 1910, and the building was completed after classes began. In 1911, 1500 students were enrolled, with a faculty of 50. Originally known as Oklahoma High School, the school was renamed Central High School in 1919. The name change reflected the growth of the school district, which by 1920 had three high schools.

The school went through a number of iterations throughout its over seven decades of existence, serving as a high school, a junior high school, a middle school, and finally as the alternative school Central Innovative High School. 1981 was the final school year for Central Innovative High School, and Oklahoma City Public Schools sought buyers for the building.

=== Conversion to offices ===
Southwestern Bell bought the school building in 1981, and purchased two adjacent parcels of land on the same block in 1982. The school district sold the property to Southwestern Bell for $2.7 million ($7.9 million in 2024), over the objections of the Oklahoma Museum of Art, which was attempting to raise the necessary funds to purchase the building for itself. Southwestern Bell renovated the building and renamed it One Bell Central, and included a museum to Central High School in the building's lobby. The renovations included the conversion of the school's auditorium into a courtyard, retaining the proscenium arch as an architectural feature.

=== 1995 Oklahoma City bombing ===
On April 19, 1995, the Oklahoma City bombing destroyed the Alfred P. Murrah Federal Building, located two blocks west of the former school. One Bell Central was damaged in the bombing, but remained structurally sound. The day of the bombing, Southwestern Bell president David Lopez offered the Oklahoma City fire chief the use of the building as an incident command post, and it served in that capacity for weeks. Southwestern Bell was able to support the communications needs of the hundreds of first responders. Some functions at One Bell Central were moved to the Myriad Convention Center in the days following the bombing, as the recovery effort continued.

As part of the incident response, a group of chaplains established themselves in the building's parking garage, using organizational strategies developed from a "Chaplain's Corner" program at the Oklahoma State Fair. A total of 255 chaplains participated in the response, caring for rescue workers, survivors, and families of the victims.

=== Oklahoma City University School of Law ===
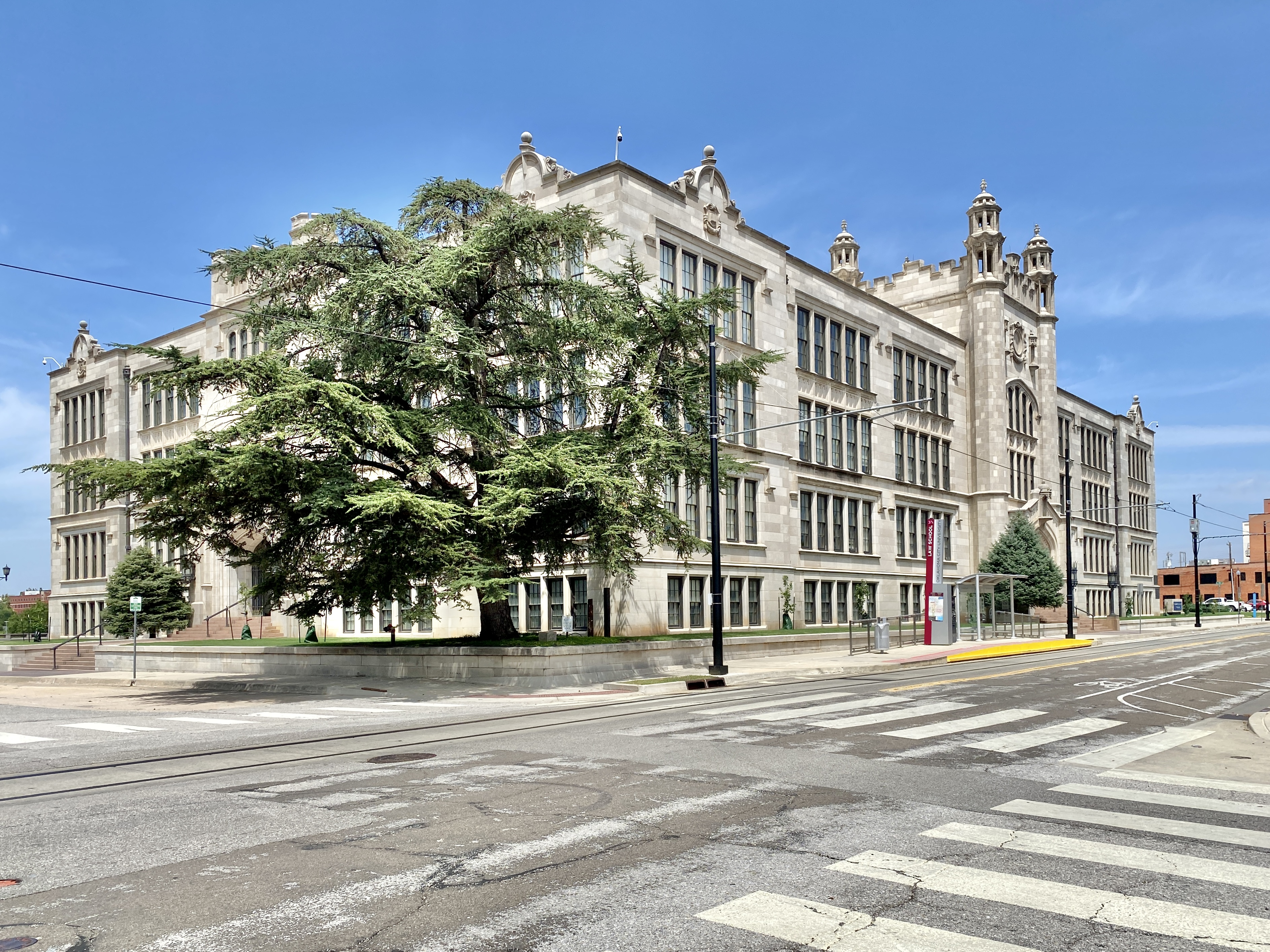
View from the southeast, with Oklahoma City Streetcar stop, 2023

One Bell Central served as Southwestern Bell and later SBC Communications' Oklahoma headquarters until 2005, when SBC Communications consolidated its Oklahoma City offices and vacated the building. SBC sold the building to the Oklahoma Farmers Union Mutual Insurance Company in 2005. The insurance company never fully occupied the space, and announced that it would sell the building in 2010. Oklahoma City University expressed interest in the building for an expansion of its campus, and Oklahoma City Public Schools sought to repurchase the building for use as administrative offices. Oklahoma City University outbid the school district, and purchased the building in 2012.

Oklahoma City University renovated the building after purchasing it, and moved its law school to the building beginning in 2015. OCU Law established a museum on the third floor of the building, documenting the building's history.

The Law School stop of the Oklahoma City Streetcar is located in front of the building. Streetcar service began in 2018, and operates daily. The Law School stop serves southbound streetcars towards Bricktown; northbound streetcars operate on Broadway Avenue, one block east.

== Alumni ==
- Cal Clemens (1911-1965), NFL football player
- Donald W. Reynolds (1906-1993), news publisher, owner of Donrey Media Group
- Phil White (1900-1982), NFL football player and medical doctor; class of 1918
