= Senior Hall =

Senior Hall may refer to:

- Senior Hall (Berkeley, California), listed on the NRHP in California
- Senior Hall (Columbia, Missouri), listed on the NRHP in Missouri
