= Canadian County Jail and Stable =

- Canadian County Jail
- U.S. National Register of Historic Places
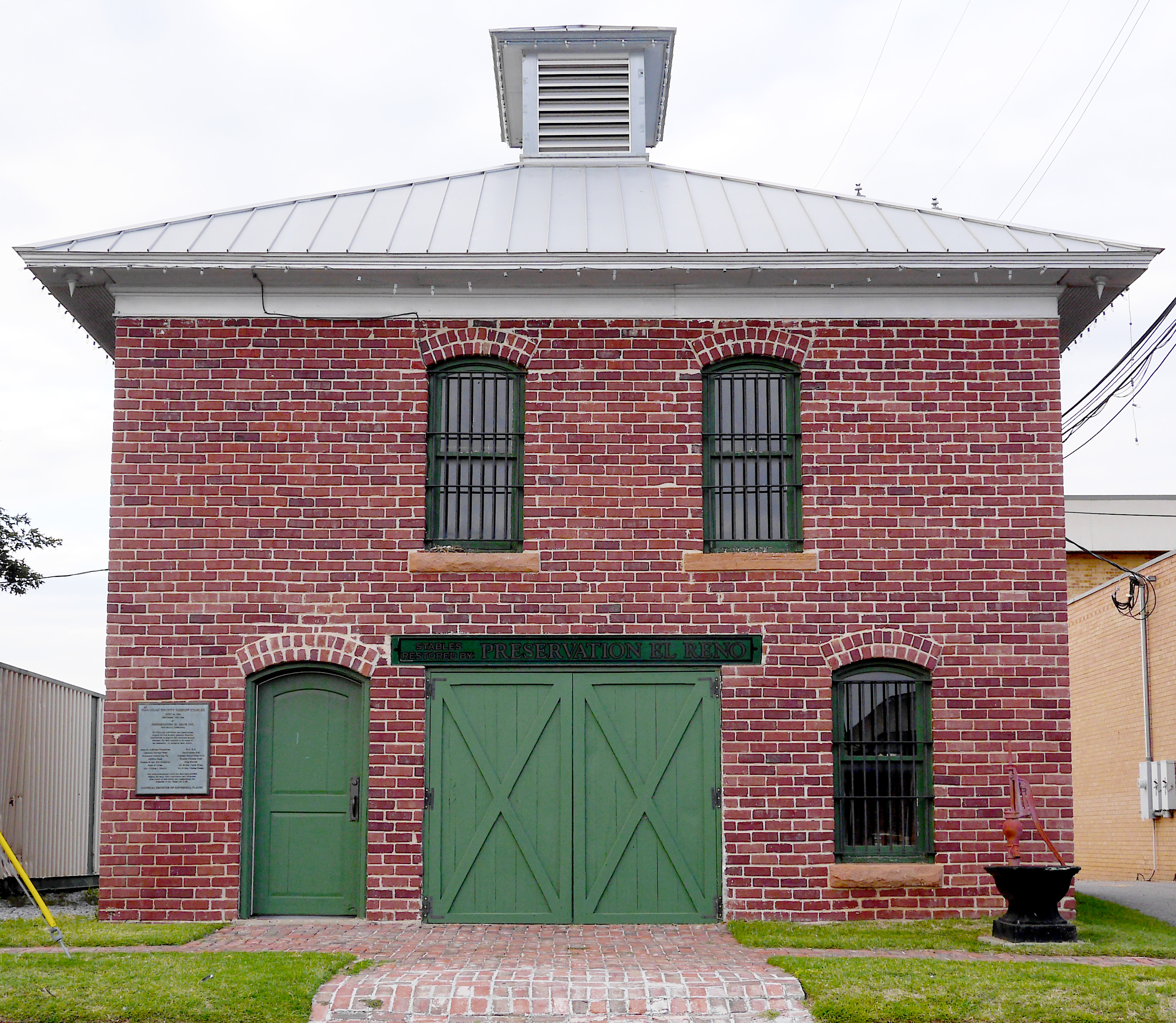
- Canadian County Stables, El Reno, Oklahoma 2014

- Location within Oklahoma Location within the United States
- Location: 301 N. Choctaw, El Reno, Oklahoma
- Coordinates: 35°32′7″N 97°57′19″W
- Area: less than one acre
- Built: 1907
- Architect: Solomon A. Layton; A.C. Kreipke
- NRHP reference No.: 85002790
- Added to NRHP: November 14, 1985; December 14, 1995

The Canadian County Jail and Stable comprises two buildings constructed at different times. The jail is a building located at 318 North Evans in El Reno, Oklahoma. It is the abandoned site of the county jail of Canadian County, and sits west of the current county jail on the same block.

The stable, located at 261 W. Rogers was listed in 1995. The stable was built sometime between 1908 and 1913. It was listed on the National Register of Historic Places (NRHP) in 1985.

The jail and stable are the oldest remaining county government structures in Canadian County.

== Jail Building ==
Designed by noted Oklahoma architect Solomon Andrew Layton, in partnership with W. J. Riley, and built by A.C. Kreipke, the jail was designed and built between 1904 and 1907, while the stable was built between 1908 and 1913. The jail is an example of Layton's early Oklahoma work, and features unusual Italian Renaissance characteristics for a utilitarian building like a county incarceration facility. It is the only public building that Layton designed in El Reno which is still standing; it is also the oldest intact county government building in Canadian County. (Note: Solomon Andrew Layton (1864 - 1943), was a native of Iowa who began his architectural career in Denver, Colorado in 1877. He moved to El Reno, in what was then Oklahoma Territory, where he partnered with W. J. Riley and first designed the Canadian County Courthouse in 1903. After completing the county courthouse design, they began designing the new county jail. The jail building was considered quite modern for its time. It had cells to hold 24 prisoners (all male), a women's ward, a separate detention room for boys, and offices for the sheriff's department.)

=== Jail description - exterior ===
The jail is a two-story, masonry building that has a symmetrical, T-shaped floor plan, about 47 feet (14 m) by 58 feet (18 m). The exterior walls have alternating horizontal bands of rustic faces and smooth wide surfaces. These are interrupted by the vertical openings of windows and doors. The banded walls appear to rest on a base of smooth stone that terminates about 4 feet (1.2 m) above grade with a water table. The west elevation is the front of the building. The main entrance has two doors, with a Doric column at each side, topped with a pediment and entablature. The other major wall openings contain tall, wood-framed windows. Except for the windows flanking the main entrance, the windows are covered with iron bars and red-painted screens. The upper windows contain diagonal muntins.

A single brick chimney penetrates the roof, which is covered with composition shingles. Inspection of the chimney about the time of the NRHP application showed that it needed unspecified repairs.

Several alterations have been made during the building's history. For example, air-conditioning units project from three of the windows. A structure added during the 1970s connected the jail with an existing building described as a carriage house (sic). (Note: The "carriage house" was almost certainly the building now known as the Stable - Ed.) The additional structure was removed in 1991, and the door that connected it to the jail was filled with concrete blocks. Another exterior addition, providing more office space, was constructed along the east wall between 1954 and 1960. It connected the jail to the stable. This addition was also removed in 1991.

== Jail closure ==
The Oklahoma State Health Department ordered Canadian County officials to close the upper floor jail cells in October, 1982, because the building did not have a fire escape. The first floor of the building was allowed to remain open until a new jail facility could be finished. Part of the old jail was used for county offices until October 1986, and was then used to store guns, alcohol and drugs confiscated by county deputies.

== See also ==
- Layton & Forsyth
- Solomon Andrew Layton
