= 1934 All-Pacific Coast football team =

American all-star college football team

The 1934 All-Pacific Coast football team consists of American football players chosen by various organizations for All-Pacific Coast teams for the 1934 college football season. The organizations selecting teams in 1934 included the Associated Press (AP), the Newspaper Enterprise Association, and the United Press (UP).

== All-Pacific Coast selections ==
=== Quarterback ===
- Joe Salatino, Santa Clara (AP-1; UP-1)
- Frank Alustiza, Stanford (NEA-1)
- Ed Goddard, Washington State (UP-2)

=== Halfbacks ===
- Bob "Bones" Hamilton, Stanford (AP-1; NEA-1; UP-1)
- Arleigh Williams, California (AP-1; NEA-1; UP-1)
- Frank Sobrero, Santa Clara (AP-2; UP-2)
- Cal Clemens, USC (AP-2)
- Charles "Chuck" Cheshire, UCLA (UP-2)

=== Fullback ===
- Bobby Grayson, Stanford (AP-1; NEA-1; UP-1)
- Paul Sulkosky, Washington (AP-2; UP-2)

=== Ends ===
- Butch Morse, Oregon (AP-1; NEA-1; UP-1)
- Monk Moscrip, Stanford (AP-1; NEA-1; UP-1) (College Football Hall of Fame)
- Eddie Erdelatz, St. Mary's (AP-2; UP-2)
- Keith Topping, Stanford (AP-2)
- Louis O'Bryan, Loyola (UP-2)

=== Tackles ===
- Bob Reynolds, Stanford (AP-1; NEA-1; UP-1) (College Football Hall of Fame)
- George Theodoratus, Washington State (AP-2; NEA-1; UP-1)
- Jim Barber, Univ. of San Francisco (AP-1; UP-2)
- Claude Callaway, Stanford (AP-2)
- John Yezerski, St. Mary's (UP-2)

=== Guards ===
- Verdi Boyer, UCLA (AP-1; NEA-1; UP-1)
- Charles Mucha, Washington (AP-1; NEA-1; UP-1)
- Louis Spadafore, Santa Clara (AP-2; UP-2)
- Lawrence Rouble, Stanford (AP-2)
- Frank Stojack, Washington State (UP-2)

=== Centers ===
- Larry Siemering, San Francisco University (AP-1; UP-1)
- Wes Muller, Stanford (AP-2; NEA-1; UP-2)

== Key ==
AP = Associated Press, selected by "a jury of nearly 60 sports writers, coaches and officials"

NEA = Newspaper Enterprise Association, selected by NEA sports writers in the Far West

UP = United Press, selected by a board "composed of leading sports writers of the coast and United Press writers who covered the games during the season"

Bold = Consensus first-team selection of the majority of the selectors listed above

== See also ==
- 1934 College Football All-America Team
