= Kirkpatrick Auditorium =

Performance venue in Oklahoma City, Oklahoma, U.S.

Coordinates: 35°29′41″N 97°32′23″W

Kirkpatrick Fine Art Center
- Established: 1928
- Affiliations: Oklahoma City University - College of Performing Arts
- Location: Oklahoma City, Oklahoma, USA

The Kirkpatrick Fine Art Center is the main performance venue at Oklahoma City University. It connects to the Wanda L. Bass Music Center. Combined they house the Wanda L Bass School of Music and the newly formed School of Theatre.

The Kirkpatrick Fine Art Center contains the Kirkpatrick Auditorium, Burg Theatre, Petree Recital Hall, and the School of Theatre Scene Shop.

== History ==
The Kirkpatrick Auditorium was designed by architectural firm Layton Hicks & Forsyth, and constructed by JH Frederickson & Co. John A Brown (Chairman of Board), Eugene Mantrin (President), Building Committee: PT Stuart (chairman), EB Galloway, CSMC Creight, EDS Vaught in 1928.

Col. Charles Lindbergh broke ground on the KFAC September 28, 1927. When it was decided to attach the Bass Music Center to the KFAC, ground was broken on September 28, 2006. The ground breaking team consisted of Mary Coffee (Vice President), Tom McDaniel (University President), William Shdeed (Chairman Board of Trustees), Noah Bass, Wanda L. Bass, Eric Lindbergh, Mark Parker (Music School Dean), Steven Hughes (Music Student), Mandy Heaps (Student Senate President), Florence Birdwell (Music Professor), and Anne Hoover (Music School: Executive Advisory Board President)
The Kirkpatrick Fine Arts Center was renovated and renamed in honor of Mr & Mrs James Nelson Kirkpatrick in 1967. (The Kirkpatrick Fine Arts Center was dedicated on January 12, 1968, and named after John E. and Eleanor Blake Kirkpatrick). Please see https://www.newspapers.com/newspage/452033441/ for appropriate citation
The Kirkpatrick Fine Arts Auditorium was rededicated on November 21, 1980, in a co-op project with OKCU and Lyric Theatre of Oklahoma City.

== Kirkpatrick Auditorium ==
The Kirkpatrick is used for Opera, Musical Theatre, Theatre, and Dance Mainstage performances. The Venue is often utilized as a rental hall. The Kirkpatrick seats approximately 1,095. Seating is separated into orchestra, rear orchestra (under balcony), and balcony.
