= Braniff Building =

Historic building in Oklahoma City

- U.S. National Register of Historic Places
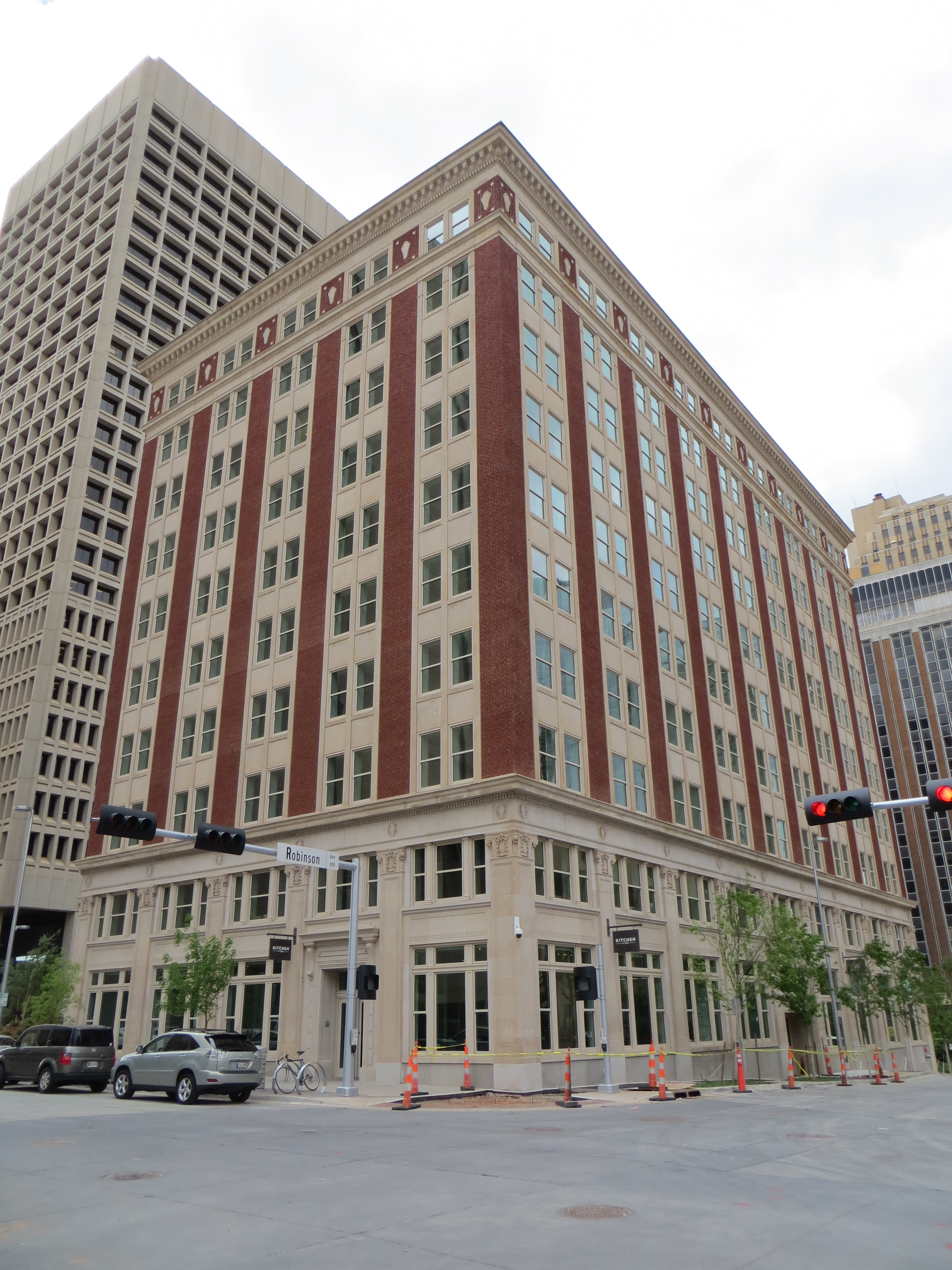

- Location within Oklahoma Location within the United States
- Location: 324 N. Robinson St., Oklahoma City, Oklahoma, US
- Coordinates: 35°28′15″N 97°30′57″W
- Area: 1 acre (0.40 ha)
- Built: 1923
- Architect: Solomon Layton
- Architectural style: Classical Revival
- NRHP reference No.: 80003281
- Added to NRHP: February 28, 1980

The Braniff Building is a historic 10-story office building in Oklahoma City, Oklahoma. It was designed by Solomon Andrew Layton and built in 1923. It was the first office for Braniff Airlines and is located at 324 North Robinson Street. It is listed on the National Register of Historic Places.

The Braniff Building was purchased by Kerr-McGee Oil Company in 1964 and signage for Braniff removed. It was damaged in the Oklahoma City bombing. It sat empty for 30 years before it was purchased and renovated by SandRidge Energy. The building sold for $15.9 million in 2016. It is home to restaurant Kitchen No. 324 and the law firm Crowe Dunlevy.

== See also ==
- National Register of Historic Places listings in Oklahoma County, Oklahoma
