= Oklahoma County Courthouse =

Historic building in Oklahoma, United States

- U.S. National Register of Historic Places
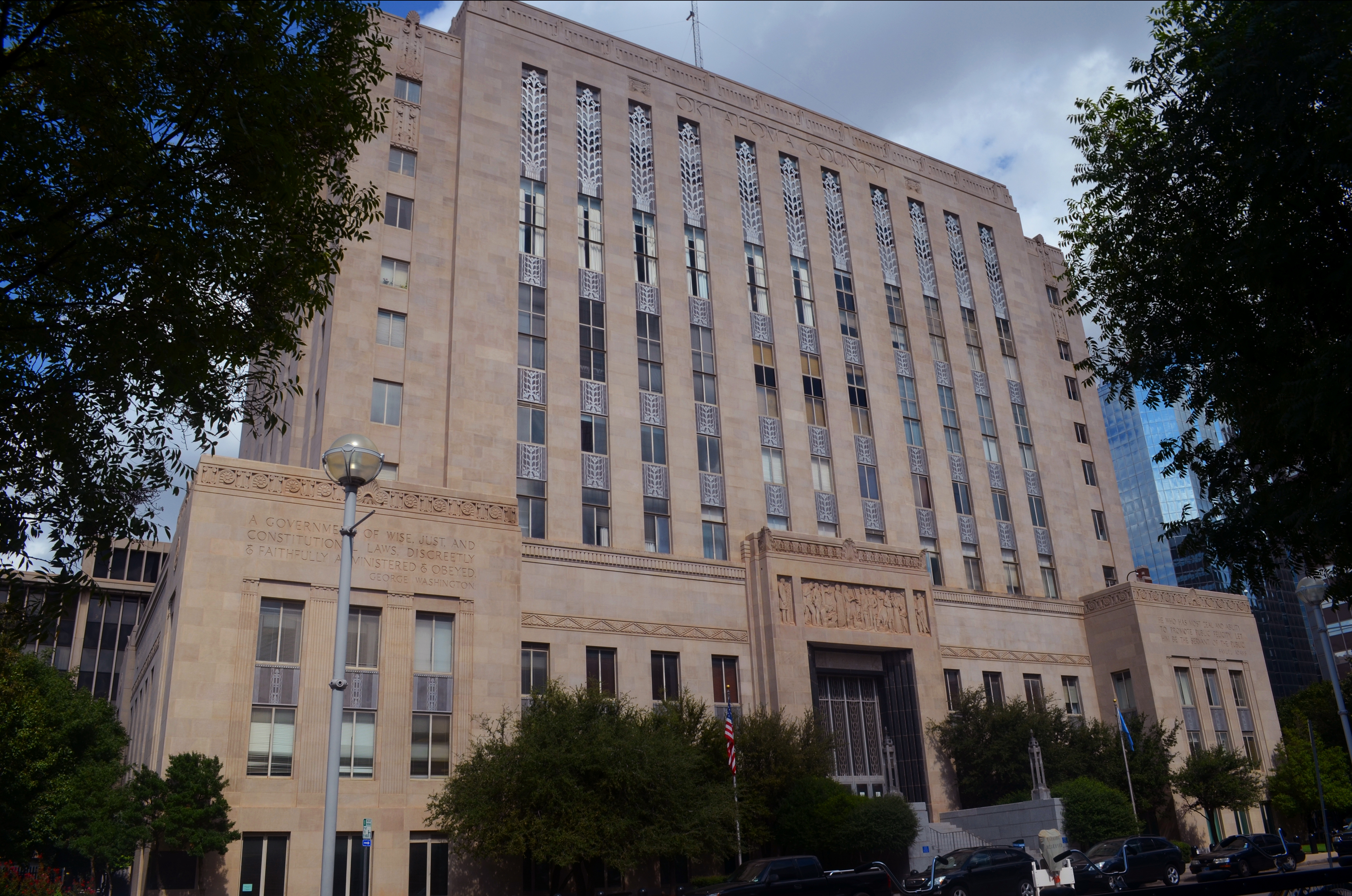

- Location within Oklahoma Location within the United States
- Interactive map showing the location of Oklahoma County Courthouse
- Location: 321 Park Ave., Oklahoma City, Oklahoma
- Coordinates: 35°28′8″N 97°31′14″W
- Area: 1.3 acres (0.53 ha)
- Built: 1937
- Built by: Manhattan Construction Co.
- Architect: Layton & Forsyth
- Architectural style: Art Deco
- MPS: County Courthouses of Oklahoma TR
- NRHP reference No.: 92000126
- Added to NRHP: March 5, 1992

Oklahoma County Courthouse in Oklahoma County, Oklahoma was designed by prominent Oklahoma architect Solomon Layton and partners George Forsyth and Jewel Hicks of the firm Layton & Forsyth, and was built in 1937. It replaced the original courthouse that was built with $100,000 in bonds issued and located at the intersection of California and Robinson at 520 West Main Street in the 1900s.

The building is located at 321 Park Avenue. It cost $1.5 million paid for with a bond issue and money from the Public Works Administration (PWA), "a federal program to create jobs in The Great Depression.

The 11-floor concrete courthouse building is considered art deco / art moderne and was listed on the National Register of Historic Places in 1992. Quotes are inscribed in the "sandy-brown Indiana limestone" and a carved mural depicts "a scene of Oklahoma friendship" between a Native American figure and a Mountain Man.

The building is said to be "loosely abstracted from stepped-back Mayan temples" and includes a two-story lobby with terrazzo floor with a compass design as well as abstracted wagon wheel chandeliers and third story overlooks. In 1967 a modern architecture building was constructed next to the courthouse and connected by a walkway.

The courthouse was listed on the National Register of Historic Places on March 5, 1992.

Rick Warren is the Court Clerk.

== See also ==
- List of tallest buildings in Oklahoma City
- List of tallest buildings in Oklahoma
- National Register of Historic Places listings in Oklahoma County, Oklahoma
