= 101 Park Avenue (Oklahoma City) =

Building in Oklahoma City, Oklahoma

101 Park Avenue Building
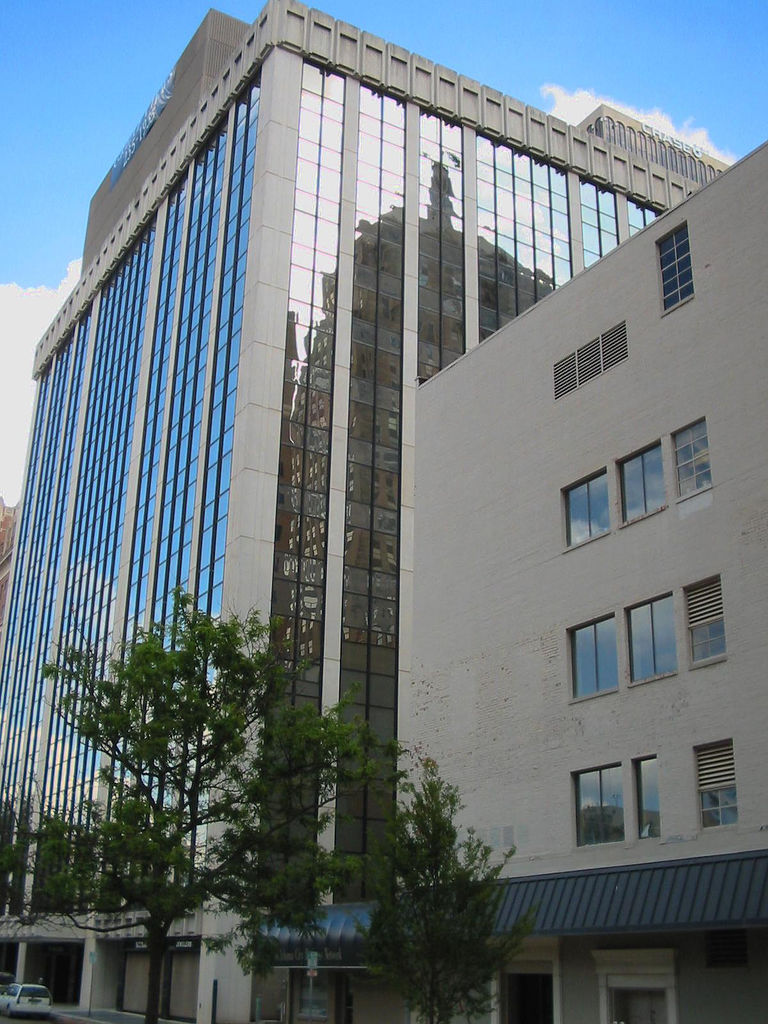
- 101 Park Avenue Building
- Interactive map of the 101 Park Avenue Building area

General information
- Status: Completed
- Type: Office
- Location: 101 Park Avenue, Oklahoma City, Oklahoma; United States
- Coordinates: 35.4690°N 97.5148°W
- Completed: 1938
- Opening: 1938
- Renovated: 1974

Height
- Roof: 55.0 m (180 ft)

Technical details
- Floor count: 16
- Floor area: 17,567 m^{2} (189,090 sq ft)
- Lifts/elevators: 8

101 Park Avenue is a building in Oklahoma City, Oklahoma. It was formerly known as the Skirvin Tower, built in 1932 as a luxury apartment-hotel annex to the Skirvin Hotel.

== History ==
Crews broke ground on the Skirvin Tower in March 1931. Work continued until suddenly in January 1932 when William Balser Skirvin ran out of funds for the project. Work was halted until 1934, and completed in 1938.

In 1974, the building was remodeled into a glass-enclosed office building.

== Architecture ==
The building is an example of Modern architecture, and specifically International Style, characterized by its rectangular form, horizontal lines, and use of steel.

== See also ==
- List of tallest buildings in Oklahoma City
