= John Yezerski =

American football player (1913–1979)

- Yezerski in 1935

No. 12
- Position: Tackle

Personal information
- Born: September 22, 1913; Portland, Oregon, U.S.
- Died: January 18, 1979 (aged 66); Boring, Oregon, U.S.
- Listed height: 6 ft 4 in (1.93 m)
- Listed weight: 240 lb (109 kg)

Career information
- High school: Portland (OR) Washington
- College: Saint Mary's

Career history
- Brooklyn Dodgers (1936)

Awards and highlights
- First-team All-American (1933); Second-team All-PCC (1934)

Career statistics
- Games played: 9
- Starts: 1

John Casimer "Turk" Yezerski (September 22, 1913 – January 18, 1979), sometimes spelled Jezierski, was an American football player.

== Biography ==
Yezerski was born in 1914 in Portland, Oregon, and attended Portland's Washington High School.

He played college football for the Saint Mary's Gaels football team in 1933 to 1934. He was selected by the Newspaper Enterprise Association (NEA) as a first-team tackle on the 1933 College Football All-America Team. He was dropped from the football team in January 1935 due to scholastic deficiencies.

He also played professional football as a tackle in the National Football League for the Brooklyn Dodgers in 1936. He appeared in nine games for the Dodgers.

Yezerski died in 1979 in Boring, Oregon.
