= Cal Clemens =

American football player (1911–1965)

No. 33
- Position: Blocking back

Personal information
- Born: July 1911 (Note: July 6 according to Pro Football Reference and July 26 according to Pro Football Archives.); Omaha, Nebraska, or Oklahoma City, Oklahoma, U.S.
- Died: October 21, 1965 (aged 54); Los Angeles, California, U.S.
- Listed height: 6 ft 1 in (1.85 m)
- Listed weight: 195 lb (88 kg)

Career information
- High school: Central (Oklahoma City)
- College: USC (1931–1934)

Career history
- Los Angeles Maroons (1935); Green Bay Packers (1936); Los Angeles Bulldogs (1937)

Awards and highlights
- NFL champion (1936); National champion (1932); Second-team All-PCC (1934)
- Stats at Pro Football Reference

Charles Calvin Clemens Jr. (July 1911 – October 21, 1965) was an American professional football player who was a blocking back. He played college football for the USC Trojans, earning All-Pacific Coast Conference (PCC) honors as a senior in 1934. After college, he played professionally with the Los Angeles Maroons in 1935, before joining the Green Bay Packers of the National Football League (NFL) in 1936. He won the NFL Championship with the Packers and concluded his career in 1937 with the Los Angeles Bulldogs.

== Early life ==
According to Pro Football Reference and Pro Football Archives, Clemens was born in July 1911 (July 6 or 26), in either Omaha, Nebraska, or Oklahoma City, Oklahoma. His father worked in the hotel business and the family moved several times as Clemens grew up. While living in Kansas, Clemens received a job working for a coal company, near a high school. After finishing his work, he watched the football team at the high school practice, which was how he started his career in the sport. After attending the high school for a year, his family moved to Oklahoma City. There, he attended Central High School and competed in football basketball, track and field and swimming. In football, he played as a two-way back and was one of Central's top players, while in swimming he broke a 40-year city record in the 40-yard freestyle event. His parents moved to Los Angeles at the start of Clemens's senior year but thought that he "was doing so well that he might as well finish his schooling at Oklahoma City". After graduating from high school, he moved to Los Angeles.

== College career ==
Clemens enrolled at the University of Southern California (USC) in 1931. He played for the freshman football team that year and the Los Angeles Evening Post-Record noted that he "kicked, caught passes and played defensive football that must have made Trojan followers wish there were no such thing as a freshman rule (Note: Referring to the rule at the time that freshmen were not eligible to play on the varsity team.)". He served as captain of the freshman team. He then made the varsity team in 1932 and became the replacement for Erny Pinckert at right halfback. He was also used as a kicker. Similar to Pinckert, he was mainly used as a blocker. He contributed to the 1932 USC Trojans team which compiled an undefeated record of 10–0 and won the national championship. He remained a starter in 1933 as USC compiled a record of 10–1–1 with another national championship. That year, he was the "star" in USC's 19–0 win against Notre Dame and recorded an interception. Clemens returned in 1934 and played "consistently good ball in every appearance". After the season, he was invited to the East–West Shrine Game and was named the MVP for the West, which defeated the East by a score of 19–13. He was also selected All-PCC for the 1934 season.

== Professional career ==
Clemens signed with the Los Angeles Maroons of the American Legion League in 1935. He appeared in four games, all as a starter, for the Maroons, including one game where he threw for two touchdowns and scored another two himself. He was selected to the American Legion All-Star team that played against the Detroit Lions of the NFL after the season. In August 1936, he signed to play for the Green Bay Packers. He appeared in nine games, three as a starter, for the Packers as a blocking back. After a game against the Boston Redskins, the Green Bay Press-Gazette reported that Clemens "broke up half a dozen forward passes and tackled like a sledge hammer". He helped the Packers win the 1936 NFL Championship Game. He played with the Los Angeles Bulldogs of the American Football League (AFL) in 1936, playing in four games and scoring a touchdown as the team won the league title with a record of 9–0.

== Later life and death ==
After his playing career, Clemens served as a high-ranking official for the Shriners. He also worked as an assistant coach for the Loyola Marymount Lions and worked at a defense plant. With his wife, Susan, Clemens had two daughters. He was sick with cancer in his last years and died on October 21, 1965, at the age of 54.
