= Daniel J. Donahoe House =

Historic house in Oklahoma, United States

- U.S. National Register of Historic Places
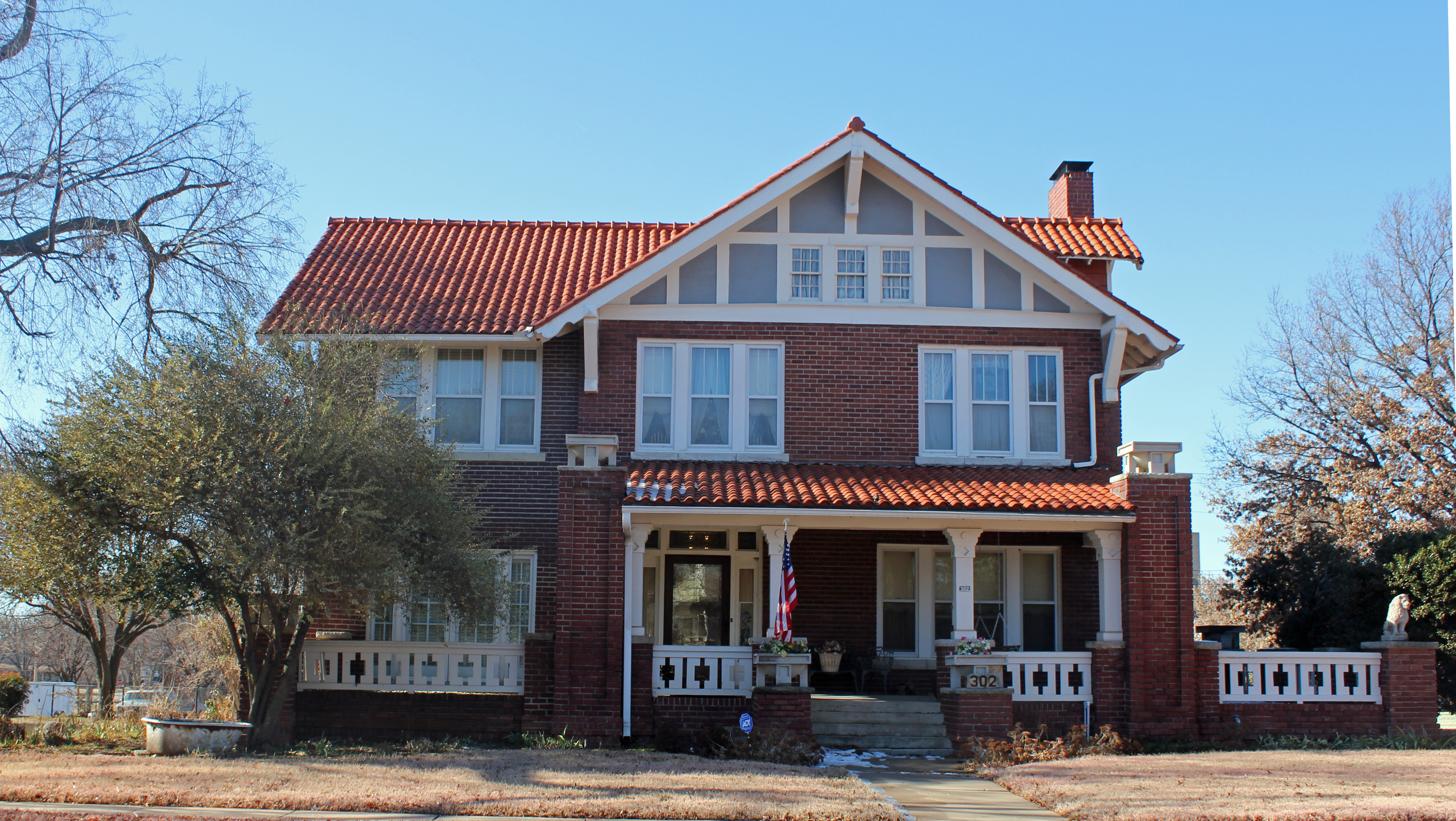

- Location within Oklahoma Location within the United States
- Location: 302 S. 7th St., Ponca City, Oklahoma
- Coordinates: 36°42′04″N 97°04′33″W
- Area: 1 acre (0.40 ha)
- Built: 1910
- Built by: O.F. Keck
- Architect: Solomon A. Layton
- Architectural style: Bungalow/craftsman
- NRHP reference No.: 82003686
- Added to NRHP: March 10, 1982

The Daniel J. Donahoe House is a historic residence in Ponca City, Oklahoma. It is listed on the National Register of Historic Places. The house was designed by Solomon Layton and constructed by O.F. Keck in 1910.

It was deemed a "fine example" of Craftsman architecture.
