= Oklahoma Publishing Company Building =

Historic building in Oklahoma, United States

- U.S. National Register of Historic Places
- U.S. Historic district – Contributing property
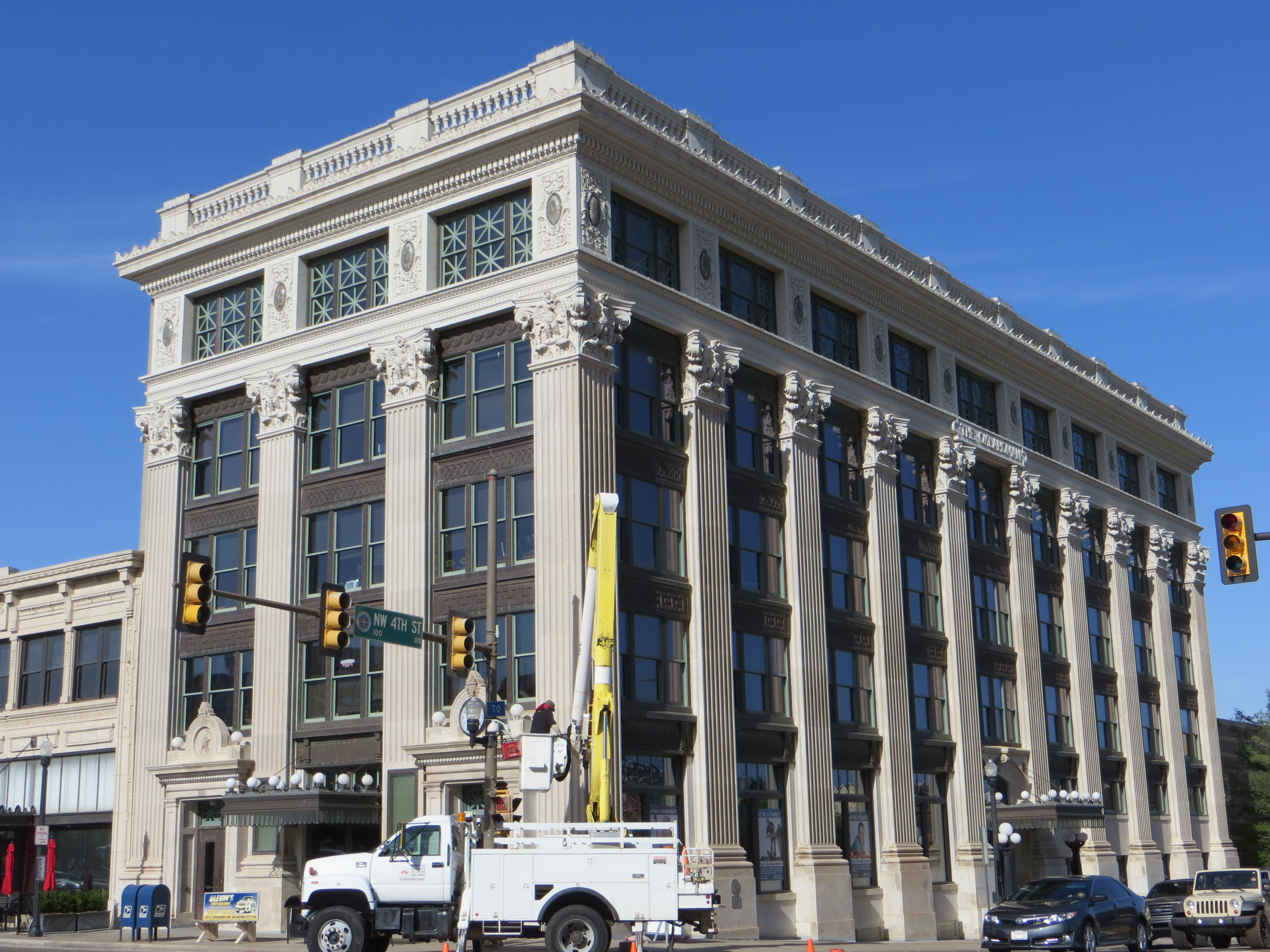
- Oklahoma Publishing Company Building

- Location within Oklahoma Location within the United States
- Location: 500 N. Broadway, Oklahoma City, Oklahoma
- Coordinates: 35°28′19″N 97°30′50″W
- Area: less than one acre
- Built: 1909
- Built by: Westlake Construction Co.
- Architect: Layton, Solomon Andrew Layton
- Part of: Automobile Alley Historic District (ID99000351)
- NRHP reference No.: 78002249
- Added to NRHP: September 18, 1978

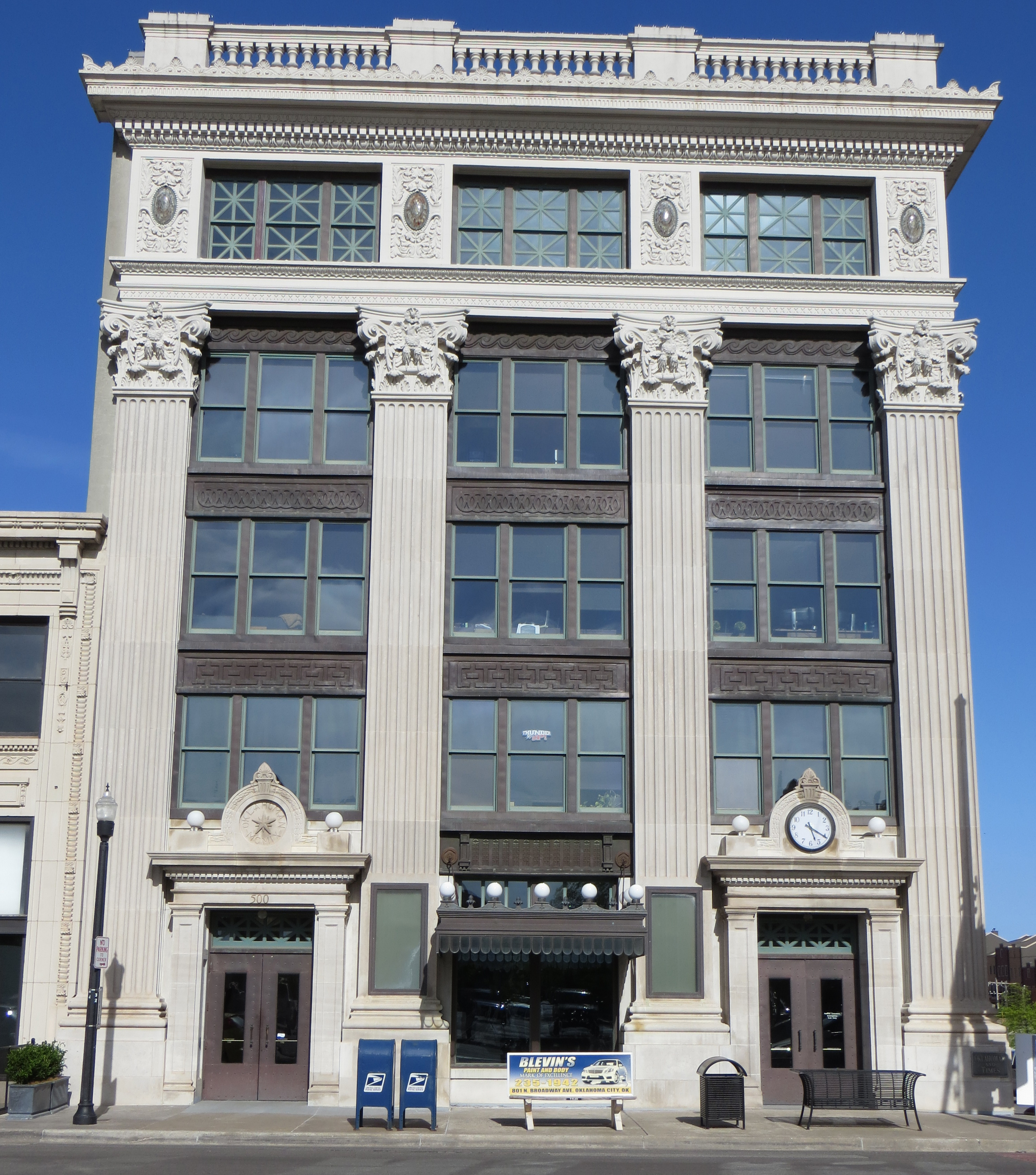
Side view of building

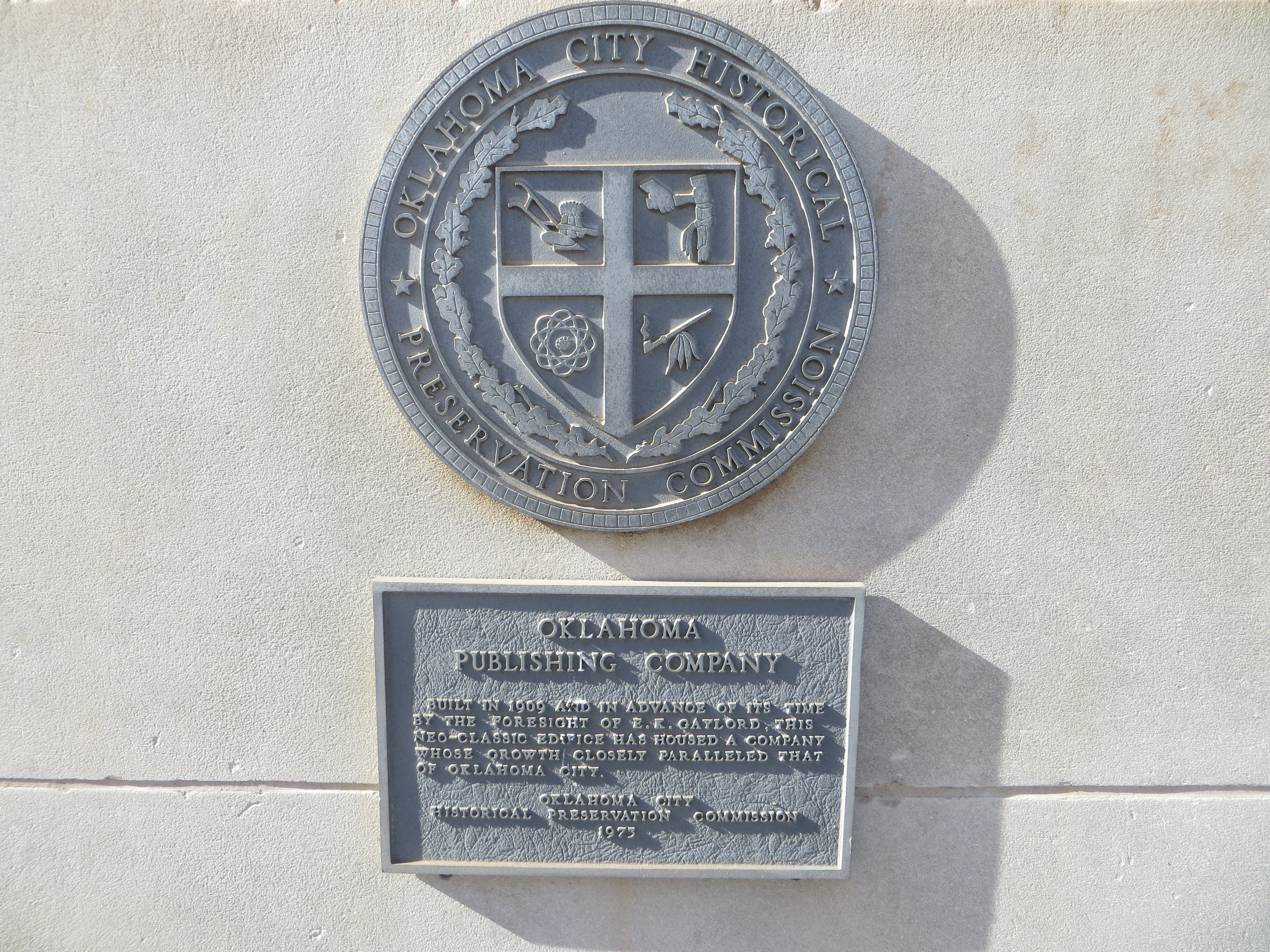
Plaque

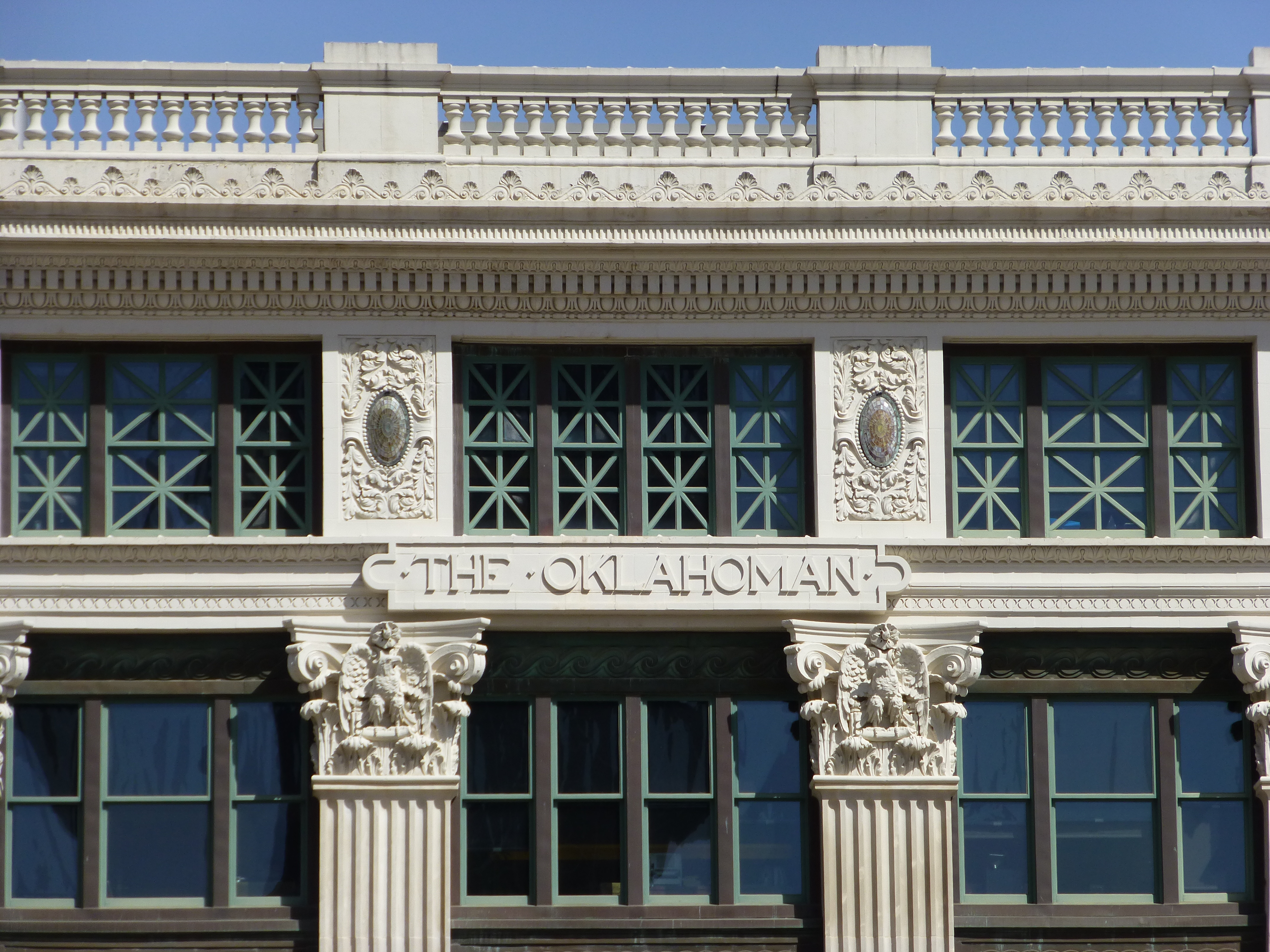
Detail of building

The Oklahoma Publishing Company Building, also referred to as the Daily Oklahoman Building, is an historic structure on 4th and Broadway in Oklahoma City. It was built for the publishing company behind The Oklahoman. It was designed by Solomon Layton and built in 1909 after the paper's previous building was destroyed by fire. It is listed on the National Register for Historic Places. Layton also designed the Oklahoma State Capitol, governor's mansion, numerous county courthouses, public schools, and other significant structures.

It is a five-story building. The Oklahoma Publishing Company has a history in offering financial support in Oklahoma's educational, civic and social infrastructure.
