= Perle Mesta =

American diplomat

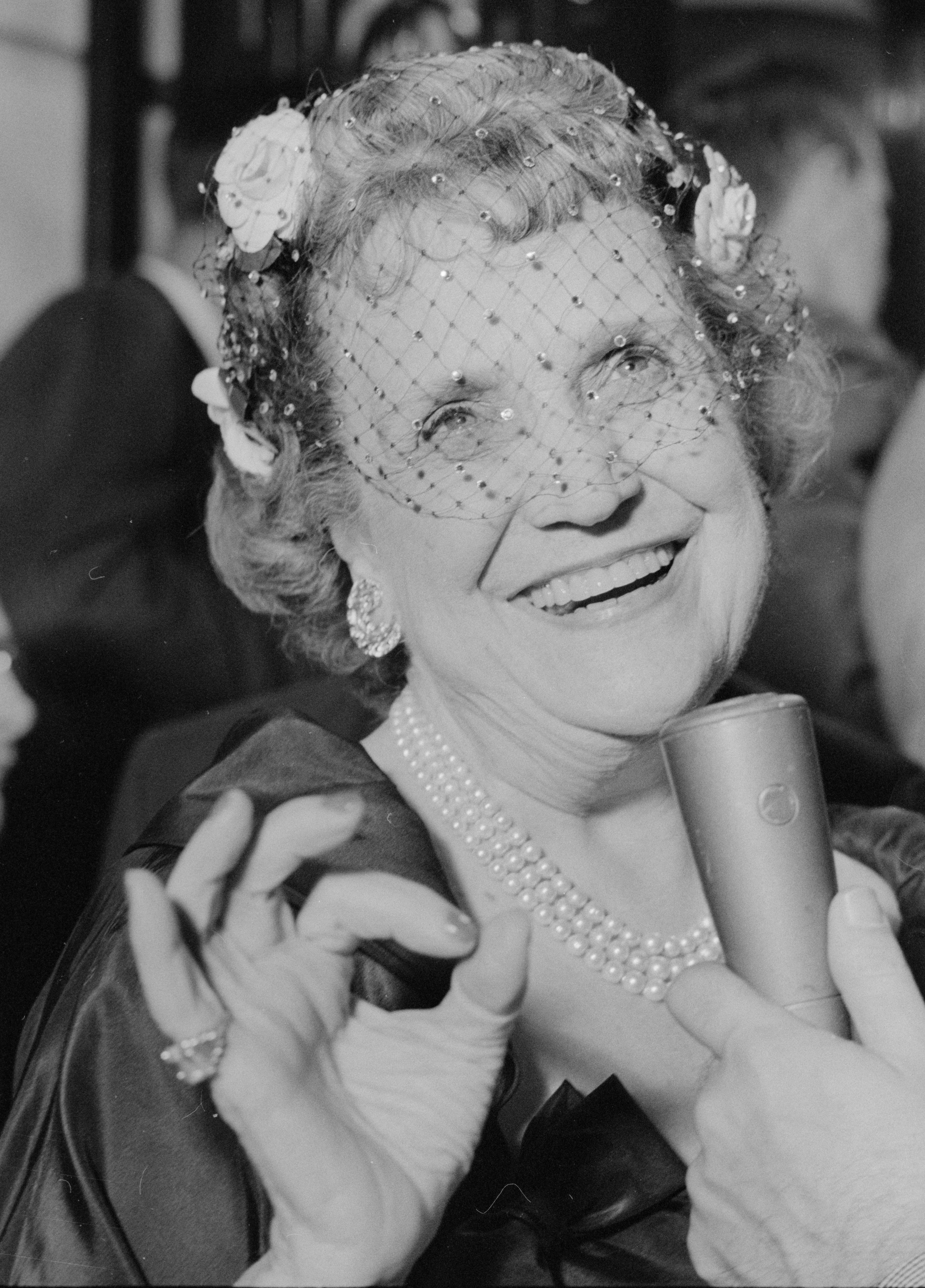
- Mesta in 1959

United States Ambassador to Luxembourg
- In office July 6, 1949 – April 13, 1953
- President: Harry S Truman
- Preceded by: Alan G. Kirk
- Succeeded by: Wiley T. Buchanan Jr.

Personal details
- Born: Pearl Skirvin; October 12, 1882 Sturgis, Michigan, U.S.
- Died: March 16, 1975 (aged 92) Oklahoma City, Oklahoma U.S.
- Party: Democratic (after 1940); Republican (before 1940)
- Spouse: George Mesta

Perle Reid Mesta (born Pearl Skirvin; October 12, 1882 – March 16, 1975) was an American socialite, political hostess, and United States ambassador to Luxembourg (1949–53).

Mesta was known for her lavish parties for Washington, D.C., society. Attendees included artists, entertainers and many national political figures.

She was the inspiration for Irving Berlin's musical Call Me Madam, which starred Ethel Merman as the character based on Mesta in both the Broadway play and the movie. She appeared on the March 14, 1949, cover of Time. She was the title character played by Shirley Booth in the Playhouse 90 feature "The Hostess with the Mostess" in 1957. In a 2009 essay by Thomas Mallon, Mesta has been identified as a model for the character Dolly Harrison in Allen Drury's 1959 novel Advise and Consent.

== Biography ==
She was born Pearl Skirvin in Sturgis, Michigan, a daughter of William Balser Skirvin, an original '89er who became a wealthy Oklahoma oilman and founder of the lavish Skirvin Hotel located in downtown Oklahoma City. Her younger sister was a silent-film actress, Marguerite Skirvin Tyson (1896–1963) and her younger brother was an oil man, rancher and investor, Oren William Skirvin (1897-1981). Mesta married Western Pennsylvania steel manufacturer and engineer George Mesta in 1916, but was widowed in 1925; she was the only heir to his $78 million fortune ($1.43 billion today). Mesta settled in Newport, Rhode Island, but moved to Washington, D.C. in 1940. She also maintained a home in the Pittsburgh suburb of West Homestead, Pennsylvania, the location of her late husband's Mesta Machinery plant and headquarters, but spent little time there, as she felt largely unaccepted by the Pittsburgh social scene. Four years later, Mesta changed the spelling of her first name to Perle.

She was active in the National Woman's Party and was an early supporter of an Equal Rights Amendment. She switched to the Democratic Party in 1940 and was an early supporter of Harry S. Truman, who rewarded her with an ambassadorship to Luxembourg.

Mesta is most noted for her festive parties, which brought together senators, congressmen, cabinet secretaries and other government figures in bipartisan soirées of high-class glamour. Invitation to a Mesta party was a sure sign that one had reached the inner circle of Washington political society. Her influence peaked during the Truman era; being an old friend of the Eisenhowers, she maintained her social position throughout the 1950s despite her support of the Democratic Party. Her power waned significantly with the rise of the Kennedys in 1960. Perle was, in fact, a friend of Rose Kennedy, but a generation gap between her and Jacqueline Kennedy had made it impossible for her to stay relevant during the Kennedy era. Nevertheless, she remained an avid hostess until her later years.

She was apparently the inspiration for the Black Russian cocktail when the bartender at the Hotel Metropole in Brussels decided to make a signature drink for her.

Mesta wrote the autobiography Perle: My Story, published in 1960, and was the subject of a book by Paul Lesch titled Playing Her Part: Perle Mesta in Luxembourg. Lesch also directed a documentary film about Mesta's stay in Luxembourg titled Call Her Madam (Samsa Film, 1997).

In 1951, she was inducted into the Oklahoma Hall of Fame.

Mesta died of hemolytic anemia on March 16, 1975, aged 92 in Oklahoma City, Oklahoma. She is interred with her late husband in the nonsectarian Homewood Cemetery in Pittsburgh.

Mesta is the namesake of the Mesta Park neighborhood in Oklahoma City.

== Other reference ==
- Various clippings and articles located in the Pennsylvania section of the Carnegie Library of Pittsburgh, PA.
- Gordon, Meryl (2025). The Woman Who Knew Everyone: The Power of Perle Mesta, Washington's Most Famous Hostess. Grand Central Publishing. ISBN 9781538751244.
- Mentioned in the Upton Sinclair book "O Shepard, Speak" the 10th book in his Lanny Budd Series.
