= Rhett Kouba =

York Revolution – No. 31
- Pitcher
- Born: September 3, 1999 (age 26); Woodward, Oklahoma, U.S.
- Bats: Right Throws: Right

Rhett Owen Kouba (born September 3, 1999) is an American professional baseball pitcher for the York Revolution of the Atlantic League of Professional Baseball.

== Amateur career ==
Kouba attended El Reno High School in El Reno, Oklahoma. As a senior, he went 6–2 with a 0.94 ERA and 79 strikeouts. He then played two seasons of collegiate baseball at North Central Texas College and one season at Dallas Baptist University. During his lone season at Dallas Baptist in 2021, Kouba appeared in 16 games (ten starts) and went 6–2 with a 2.77 ERA. After the season, he was selected by the Houston Astros in the 12th round of the 2021 Major League Baseball draft.

== Professional career ==
=== Houston Astros ===
Kouba signed with the Astros and played his first professional season with the Florida Complex League Astros and the Fayetteville Woodpeckers, pitching 18 1/3 innings. He split the 2022 season between the Woodpeckers and the Asheville Tourists, appearing in 18 games (ten starts) and going 6–3 with a 4.08 ERA and 85 strikeouts over 70 2/3 innings. He was selected to play in the Arizona Fall League for the Surprise Saguaros. Kouba opened the 2023 season with the Corpus Christi Hooks. In late August, he was promoted to the Sugar Land Space Cowboys. Over 28 games (24 starts) between the two teams, Kouba went 8–7 with a 3.45 ERA and 136 strikeouts over 128 innings. After the season, he won the 2023 Texas League Pitcher of the Year Award for his performance with Corpus Christi. Kouba was assigned to Sugar Land to open the 2024 season. Over 14 games (13 starts) for the season, he went 2–5 with a 6.43 ERA and 41 strikeouts over 49 innings. Kouber returned to Sugar Land for the 2025 season and pitched to a 4–3 record, 5.06 ERA, and 51 strikeouts over 80 innings. He was released on March 13, 2026.

=== York Revolution ===
On April 14, 2026, Kouba signed with the York Revolution of the Atlantic League of Professional Baseball.
