= Verdi Boyer =

American football player (1911–2003)

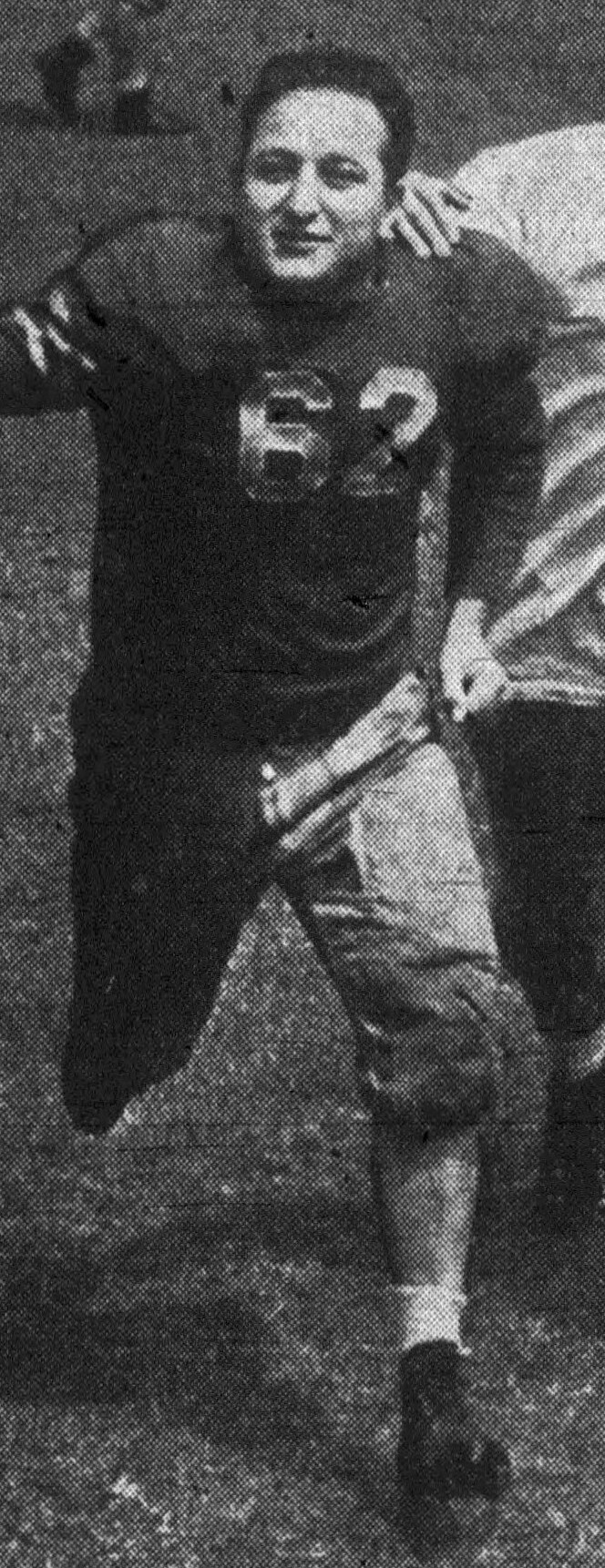
- Boyer in 1941

Profile
- Position: Guard

Personal information
- Born: September 2, 1911; San Francisco, California, U.S.
- Died: May 27, 2003 (aged 91); Pasadena, California, U.S.
- Listed height: 5 ft 10 in (1.78 m)
- Listed weight: 185 lb (84 kg)

Career information
- College: UCLA

Career history
- Brooklyn Dodgers (1936)

Awards and highlights
- First-team All-PCC (1934)

Verdi Boyer (September 2, 1911 – May 27, 2003) was an American football player. He played professionally as a guard for the Brooklyn Dodgers of the National Football League (NFL) for one season.
