= El Reno High School =

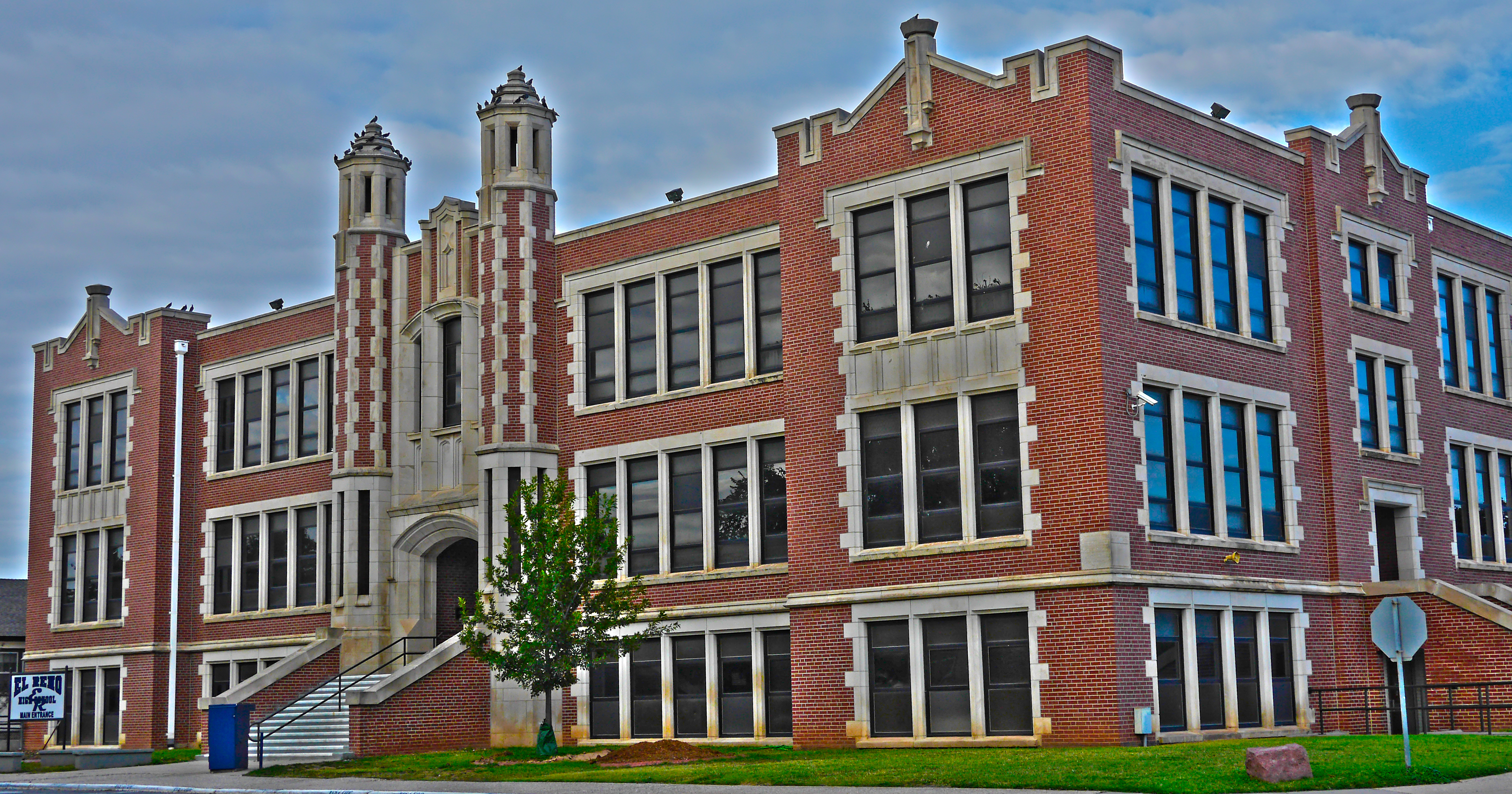

Location
- 407 S. Choctaw; El Reno, Oklahoma; United States; 35.5299°N 97.9544°W

Information
- Established: 1911
- School district: El Reno Public Schools
- Principal: Tim Pounds
- Teaching staff: 58.58 (FTE)
- Grades: 9-12
- Enrollment: 1,049 (2023-2024)
- Student to teacher ratio: 17.91
- Colors: Navy and white
- Mascot: Indian
- Website: www.elreno.k12.ok.us
- El Reno High School
- U.S. National Register of Historic Places
- Architect: Layton & Smith, S. Wemyss
- Architectural style: Late Gothic Revival
- NRHP reference No.: 00000179
- Added to NRHP: March 30, 2000

El Reno High School is a set of school buildings in El Reno, Oklahoma.

== Architectural history ==
El Reno High School, located at 407 South Choctaw, is a 2 1/2-story horizontally massed, detached building (two stories over raised basement). Measuring 175 feet east–west and 132 feet north–south, the building is oriented in an east–west direction, with the main (1911) entrance facing west on South Choctaw. The school is located in a mixed-use area, with residential areas to the west and southwest, and commercial areas to the north and east.

The building was constructed in two phases. The west half, or El Reno High School proper, constructed in 1911, was designed by the Oklahoma City firm of Layton and Smith, Oklahoma's premier architects and designers of the Oklahoma State Capitol as well as many public schools. The east half, originally built for junior high school classes, was designed by an unknown architect and was constructed in 1925–1926.

In style, the El Reno High School building incorporates many of the elements of Late Gothic Revival as applied to public buildings, also known as Collegiate Gothic, and resembles later buildings designed by Layton and Smith, such as Bizzell Memorial Library at the University of Oklahoma in Norman. The major features of this building include: flat roof with raised, shaped, and/or castellated parapet; towers with long, narrow "princess" windows; pinnacles rising from parapets or towers; and polychrome surfaces, or contrasting brick and stone work, with stone work forming copings, window and door hoods, arches, horizontal bands or water tables, and quoins. In general the two defining characteristics of the building were the decorative stonework and, before alteration, the windows. Bedford Indiana Limestone creates hood moldings that accentuate the openings and bands that emphasize the horizontal arches.

== Athletics ==
El Reno High School's mascot for its athletic teams is the Indians; their school's colors are navy blue and white, although before the 2000s the school colors were royal blue and white.

The school's athletic facilities are located primarily at El Reno's Adams Park and the nearby Canadian County Fairgrounds, both of which are along historic U.S. Route 66. The school's football stadium at Adams Park is named El Reno Public Schools Memorial Stadium; it opened and was originally dedicated in 1949 in memory of the former El Reno students who served in World War 2 and gave their lives. The stadium was rededicated on October 4, 2019, with a new monument unveiled to chronicle the 44 men that it was originally intended to honor. The school's basketball gym, the Jenks Simmons Field House, opened in 1954 as the Thunderbird Coliseum, and is known for its obscure tie to NCAA basketball history: In the 1955 NCAA basketball tournament, the Oklahoma City University Chiefs hosted a regional quarterfinal game there against the Bradley Braves, losing to Bradley 69–65. Bradley would go on to win in the Sweet Sixteen against SMU before losing to Colorado in the Elite Eight that year. For the Chiefs, this was their fourth straight tournament appearance, all losses, but they would turn it around and advance to the next two Elite Eights. The Chiefs also hosted the tournament in 1957, but this time at Capitol Hill High School in Oklahoma City.

== Notable alumni ==
- Steven Shell (Class of 2001), baseball player
- Cam Hill (Class of 2012), baseball player
- Rhett Kouba (Class of 2018), baseball player
