= Science Hall (Alva, Oklahoma) =

- U.S. National Register of Historic Places
- Location within Oklahoma
- Location: Northwestern Oklahoma State University, Alva, Oklahoma
- Coordinates: 36°47′48″N 98°40′06″W
- Area: less than one acre
- Built: 1906-07
- Architect: Solomon Andrew Layton
- Architectural style: Tudor Revival, Jacobean Revival
- NRHP reference No.: 83002141
- Added to NRHP: July 14, 1983

Science Hall is a historic building at Northwestern Oklahoma State University, and is also known as the Fine Arts Building. It was designed by Solomon Layton and completed in 1907. It was listed on the National Register of Historic Places in 1983.

It is the oldest remaining building on the campus and is an "excellent example" of Jacobean Revival architecture.
