= Cherokee Gothic =

Architectural style used on the campus of the University of Oklahoma

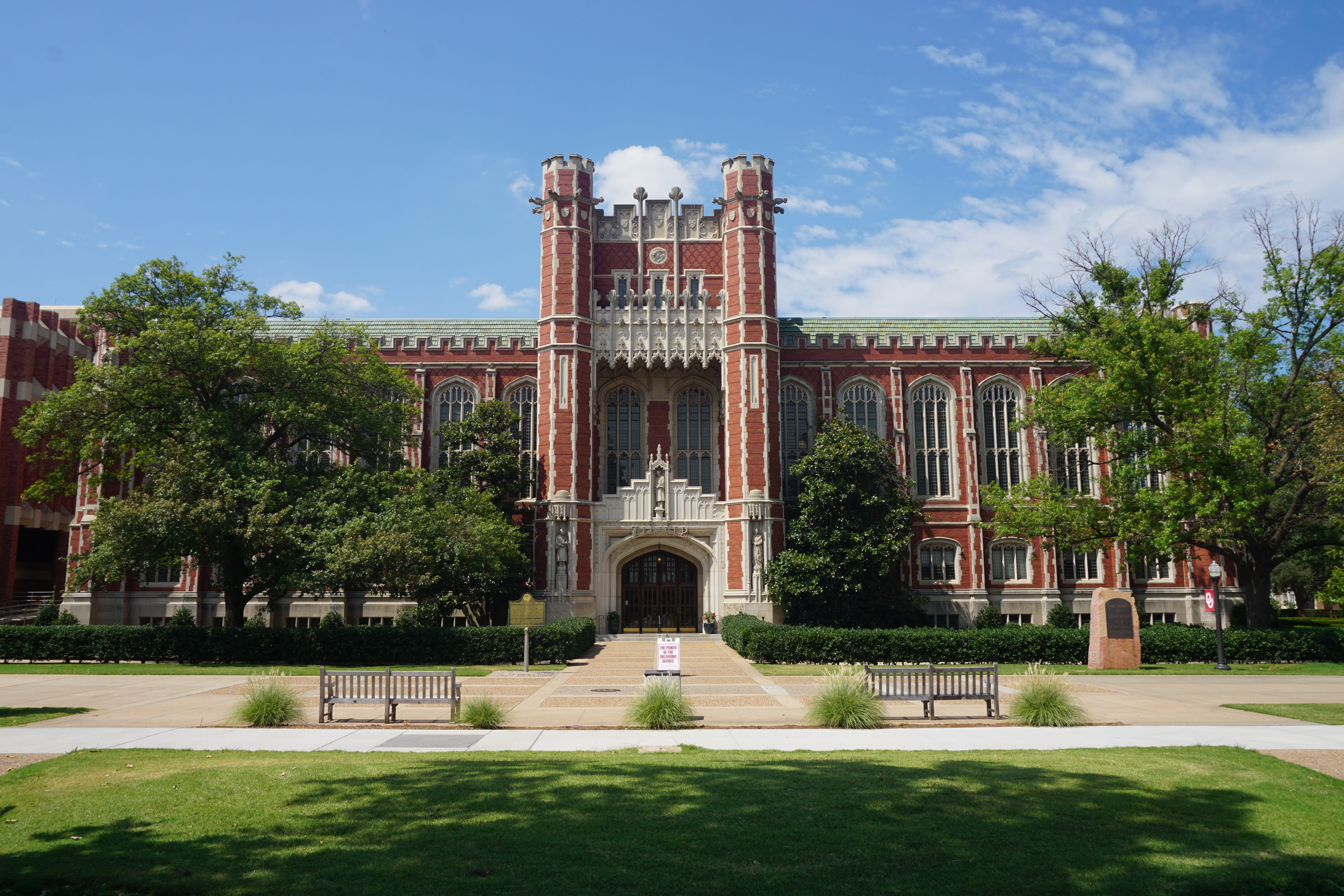
Bizzell Memorial Library

Cherokee Gothic is a term coined by Frank Lloyd Wright for a vernacular architectural style used on the campus of the University of Oklahoma. The term was invented by Wright while on a tour of the school's grounds, and, when coined, applied to Bizzell Memorial Library and Evans Hall. These buildings combined conventional Gothic Revival architecture with Native American elements. The buildings were constructed in dark and pale bricks and featured a decorative Gothic facade with light-gray stone buttresses and statues.

More recently, new construction under former university president David Boren have been designed to resemble and evoke the earlier Cherokee Gothic buildings. Buildings in the style resemble Collegiate Gothic structures found on other campuses, although they are made from brick and light stone.
