= Baum Building =

Historical building in Oklahoma

- Location within Oklahoma
- Alternative names: First Equity Building; The Insurance Center

General information
- Type: Commercial
- Location: Oklahoma City, Oklahoma, United States
- Coordinates: 35.46656°N 97.51623°W
- Groundbreaking: 1909
- Opened: May 1910
- Demolished: July-August 1972
- Cost: US$140,000

Technical details
- Floor count: 5 (+ basement)

The Baum Building was a historic building in Oklahoma City, Oklahoma. In 1909, Moses J. Baum, a Mississippi-born merchant who specialised in women's garments, leased the land at the northeast corner of Grand and Robinson and built a five-story commercial building on the site. The building was modeled after the Doge's Palace in Venice, Italy. The building was completed in 1910, with the Baum company moving in on May 5, 1910. The building was designed by Layton and Smith, and cost $140,000 to build.

During its lifespan, the building was also called the First Equity Building and the Insurance Center.

== Demolition ==
The building was demolished between July and August 1972. The beautiful and ornate building became a victim of urban renewal and I.M. Pei's street straightening project. After demolition, Robinson Street was widened from 74 feet to 134 feet.

The building's marble columns were removed and preserved, and a mural within the building was moved to a Fidelity Bank building.
