= Evans Hall =

Evans Hall is a common name for buildings on college and university campuses. Colleges which have (or had) an Evans Hall include:

- Agnes Scott College
- Becker College
- Berry College
- Carleton College
- Connecticut College
- Emory University
- Florida Institute of Technology
- Gordon College (Massachusetts)
- Henderson State University
- Indiana Wesleyan University
- Loma Linda University
- Mississippi State University (dormitory, 1964–2014)
- Ohio State University
- Philadelphia College of Osteopathic Medicine
- Point Loma Nazarene University
- Prairie View A&M University
- Ripon College
- Simmons College
- Southwestern Adventist University
- Sterling College
- University of Central Oklahoma
- University of Delaware
- University of California, Berkeley
- University of Illinois at Urbana–Champaign
- University of Oklahoma
- University of Wisconsin–Oshkosh
- Wilkes University
