= Senior Hall (Berkeley, California) =

- U.S. National Register of Historic Places
- Berkeley Landmark
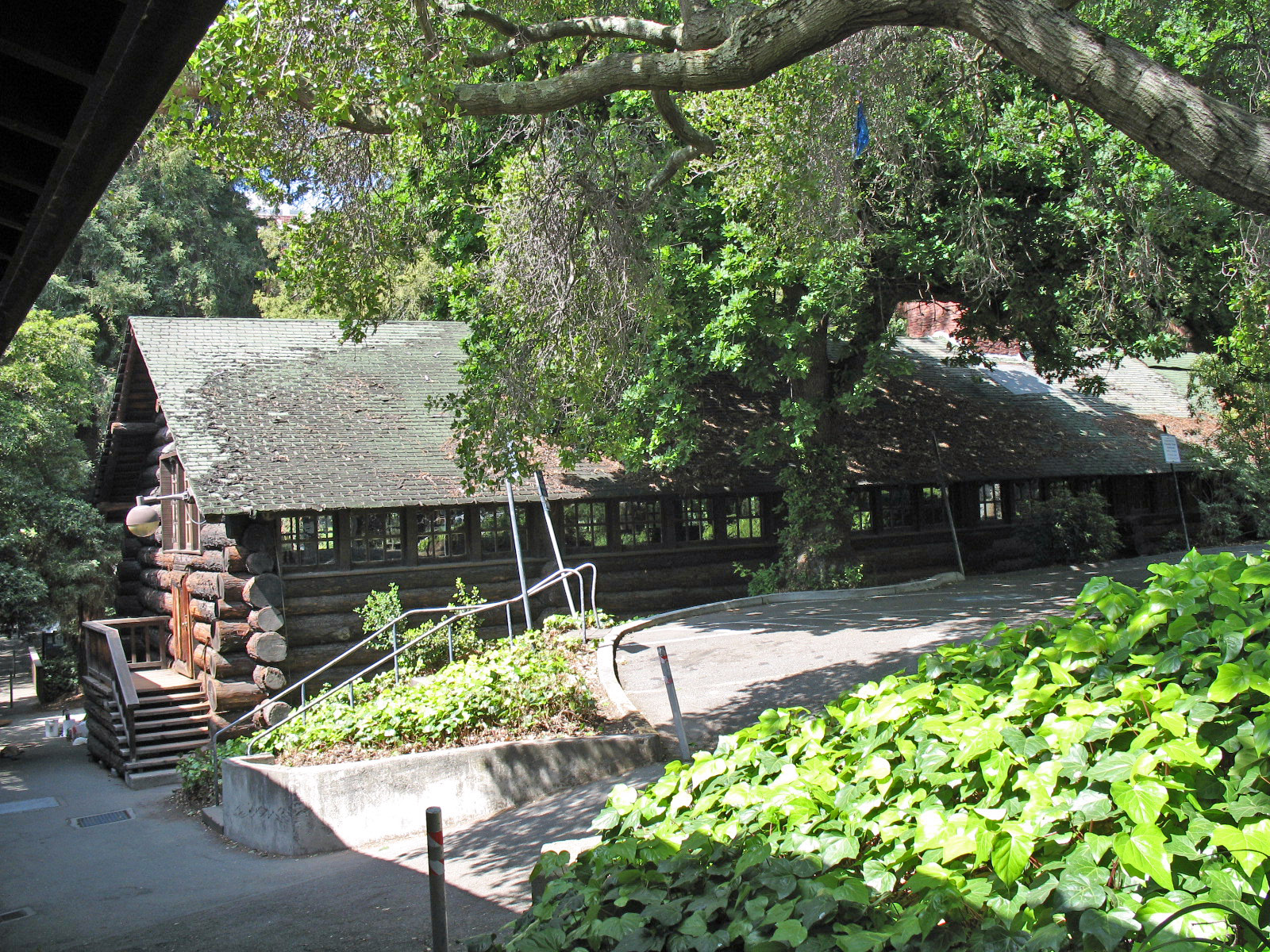
- Senior Hall, 2009

- Location within Oakland, California Location within California Location within the United States
- Location: University of California, Berkeley campus, Berkeley, California
- Coordinates: 37°52′19″N 122°15′16″W
- Built: 1906
- Architect: John Galen Howard
- Architectural style: Log cabin
- NRHP reference No.: 74000506
- BERKL No.: 17

Significant dates
- Added to NRHP: November 5, 1974
- Designated BERKL: February 25, 1991

Senior Hall, also known as Golden Bear Lodge and Senior Men's Hall, is a historic building on the University of California, Berkeley campus, in Berkeley, California. This log cabin was designed by John Galen Howard and built in 1906. It is currently used by the Order of the Golden Bear. Senior Hall was listed on the National Register of Historic Places in 1974.

== History ==
In 1905, the Order of the Golden Bear, a senior honor society at the University of California, Berkeley, proposed a building to serve as its meeting place for senior men. After receiving permission from the university to build a student hall, the Order raised money to construct its Golden Bear Lodge from private donors. The building was dedicated on September 19, 1906, and became known as Senior Men's Hall or Senior Hall.

Senior Hall is located on South Drive, in a redwood grove adjacent to Strawberry Creek on the campus of the University of California, Berkeley in Berkeley, California. Senior Hall was operated by senior male students; female students were excluded from Senior Hall in the early years. It was used as the university's student union and as a meeting place for the Order of the Golden Bear. According to the Daily Californian, Senior Hall was largely responsible for student self-governance at Berkeley, as the hall gave seniors a place to meet and discuss campus issues. Professor H. Morse Stephens called Senior Hall the "heart" of the university.

A new student union replaced the Senior Hall in 1923. However, it continues to be the home of the Order of the Golden Bear. Senior Hall had deteriorated by the 1970s and was considered for demolition to expand the nearby Faculty Club in 1973. Community and campus resistance led to the preservation of Senior Hall. It was listed on the National Register of Historic Places in 1974.

In the 1980s, Senior Hall was declared unfit for occupation. The Order of the Golden Bear raised funds to restore the building for limited use. After being closed for a couple of years for additional renovations, Senior Hall reopened in 2021 by the Order.

== Architecture ==
Senior Hall is a one-story rustic log cabin structure that is 99 by 32 feet (30.2 by 9.8 m) or 3,168 square feet (294.3 m^{2}). It was designed by architect John Galen Howard, the supervising architect for the university, pro bono. Howard wanted the building to be "characteristic California Architecture" and chose a primitive vernacular style often used for early buildings in the state.

Senior Hall was built from local redwood logs that are around twenty inches in diameter. The logs have bark on both the inside and outside of the building. It has a gable roof with wood shingles over a skip sheathing roof. It features copper flashing and gutters. The entrance is a large oak door.

Inside, Senior Hall consists of a large meeting room and a small hidden chamber for the Order of the Golden Bear. The entrance to the secret chamber is hidden, giving no indication of the room's presence when closed. A large brick fireplace is located in the central wall, with openings to both rooms. In the main room, the fireplace had a cornerstone dated 1905. The north and south sides of the building have casement windows; amber glass is used for the secret room.

Senior Hall still has its original furnishings and decor made from redwood. The secret room features a "throne".
