= Arleigh Williams =

- Arleigh Williams, 1979 (photo by Benjamin Ailes)

Biographical details
- Born: October 27, 1912; Chico, California, U.S.
- Died: October 1, 1991 (aged 78); Morro Bay, California, U.S.

Playing career
- 1932–1934: California
- Positions: Halfback, quarterback

Accomplishments and honors

Awards
- First-team All-American (1934); First-team All-PCC (1934); Second-team All-PCC (1933)

Arleigh Taber Williams (October 27, 1912 – October 1, 1991) was an American football and baseball player and university administrator.

He grew up in Oakland, California and graduated from Oakland Technical High School in 1930. He played at the halfback and quarterback positions for the California Golden Bears football team from 1932 to 1934. He was selected as a first-team All-American in 1934 by the International News Service and as a second-team All-American by the Associated Press.

He was later employed by UC-Berkeley as its director of student activities (1957–1959), dean of men (1959–1966), dean of students (1967–1970), and vice chancellor of student affairs (1970–1976).
