= Taft Middle School =

- Taft Junior High School
- U.S. National Register of Historic Places
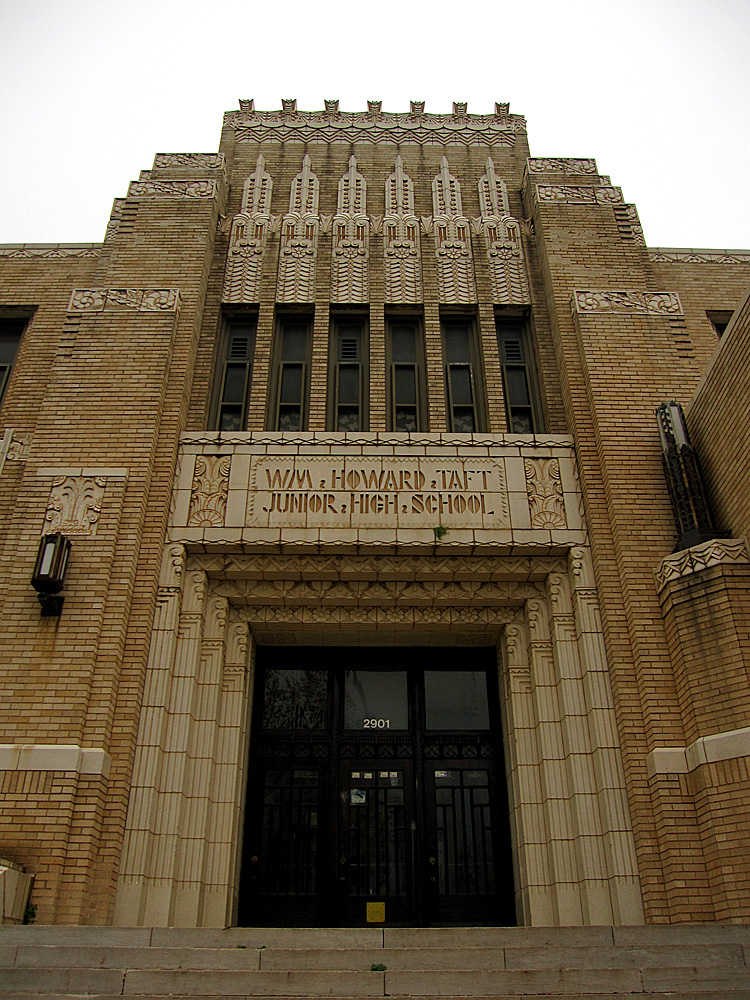
- Location: 2901 NW 23rd. St., Oklahoma City, Oklahoma
- Coordinates: 35°29′38″N 97°33′58″W
- Area: 5 acres (2.0 ha)
- Built: 1930
- Built by: Lambert Construction Co.
- Architect: Layton, Hicks & Forsyth
- Architectural style: Art Deco
- NRHP reference No.: 07000515
- Added to NRHP: June 5, 2007

Taft Middle School is a historic school in Oklahoma City, Oklahoma, listed on the National Register of Historic Places as Taft Junior High School. At 2901 NW 23rd Street, the school's art deco-style building was designed by Layton, Hicks & Forsyth and built in 1930. The two-story building includes intricate brickwork, terra cotta, and cast stone adornments as well as friezes. It is constructed of yellow brick.

Royals are the Taft mascot. The school has about 600 students.

== Athletics ==
=== Women's sports ===
- Basketball
- Cheerleading
- Cross Country
- Soccer
- Softball
- Track & Field
- Volleyball

=== Men's sports ===
- Baseball
- Basketball
- Cross Country
- Football
- Soccer
- Volleyball
- Track & Field
- Wrestling
