= Bizzell Memorial Library =

- Bizzell Library, University of Oklahoma
- U.S. National Register of Historic Places
- U.S. National Historic Landmark
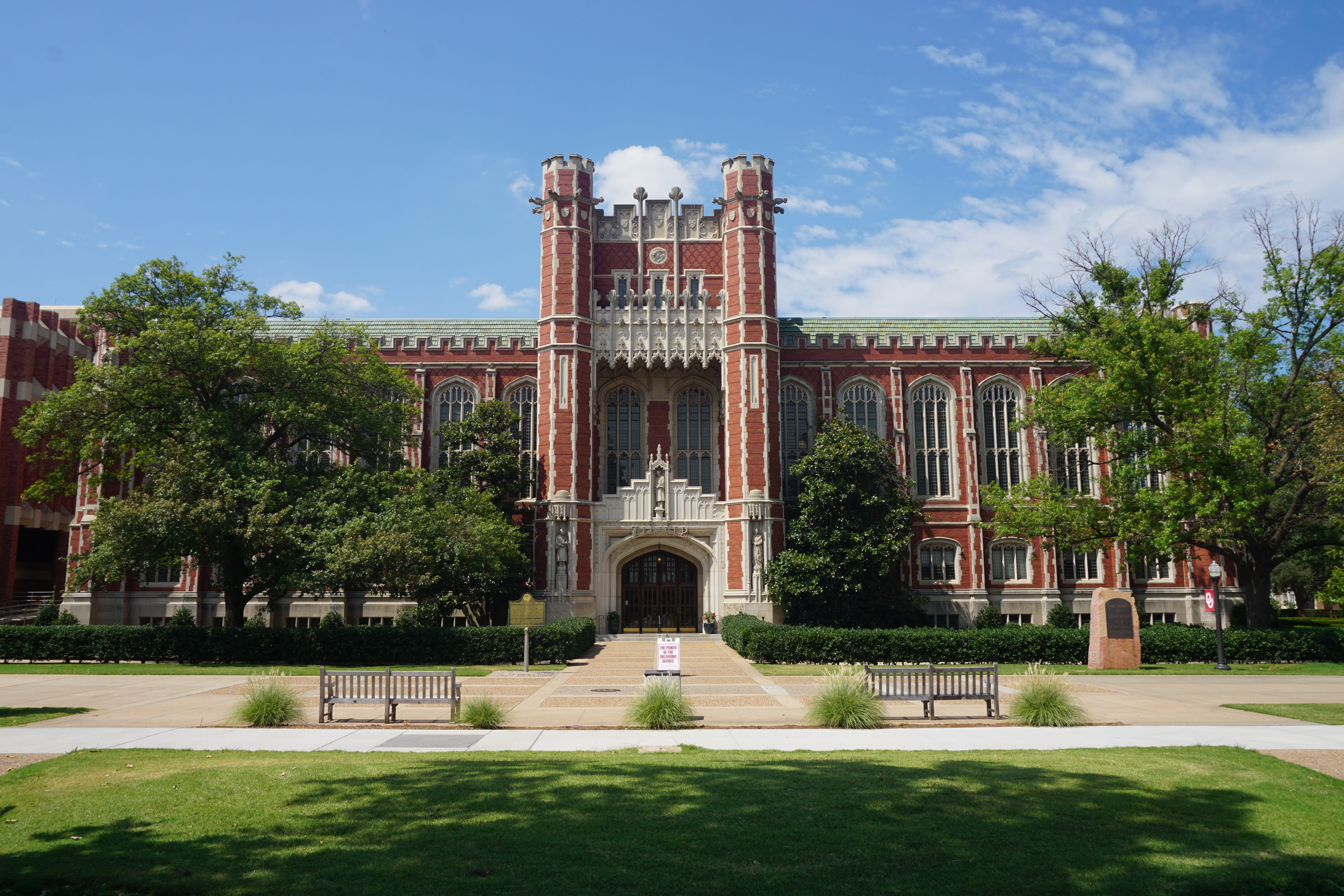
- The original entrance to Bizzell Memorial Library

- Location within Oklahoma Location within the United States
- Location: 401 W. Brooks Street, Norman, Oklahoma
- Coordinates: 35°12′28″N 97°26′44″W
- Architect: Layton Hicks & Forsyth
- Architectural style: Collegiate Gothic
- NRHP reference No.: 01000071

Significant dates
- Added to NRHP: January 3, 2001
- Designated NHL: January 3, 2001

The Bizzell Memorial Library, known also as Bizzell Library, is a five-story brick structure located at the University of Oklahoma in Norman, Oklahoma. It is an elaborate Collegiate Gothic or Cherokee Gothic building, designed by the architecture firm Layton Hicks & Forsyth and erected in 1928 during the administration of OU's fifth president, William Bennett Bizzell.

== Building history ==
When the university opened in 1890, the university library was located in the only campus building, which was destroyed by fire in 1903. A new library was constructed and opened in 1904, but the university's needs and collections quickly outgrew a space that was intended to last for decades. The Oklahoma Legislature appropriated $75,000 in 1917 to construct yet another library building that could be expanded in the future, but subsequent legislatures did not appropriate necessary funds to allow the project to move forward.

In 1927, state officials budgeted $500,000 for construction of a new, three-story library. New facilities included a "treasure room" to hold rare books and special collections and separate spaces for graduate and undergraduate work. A reading room, known today as the Great Reading Room, held the bulk of the 105,000 volumes the university then owned. The new library was dedicated on February 21, 1929.

Under George Lynn Cross, the University's seventh president, a 1958 addition effectively tripled the size of the structure. After a generous donation by Doris W. Neustadt, a 1982 addition was completed during the William S. Banowsky administration.

Presently, Bizzell serves as the flagship research library in the state of Oklahoma and of the University's system of eight libraries on the Norman campus that hold a combined 5 million volumes. Bizzell also houses the University Libraries administration; the History of Science, Nichols Rare Books, Bass Business and Bizzell Bible Special Collections; and the University of Oklahoma School of Library and Information Studies. The University of Oklahoma Library System is a member of the Association of Research Libraries.

== Desegregation landmark ==
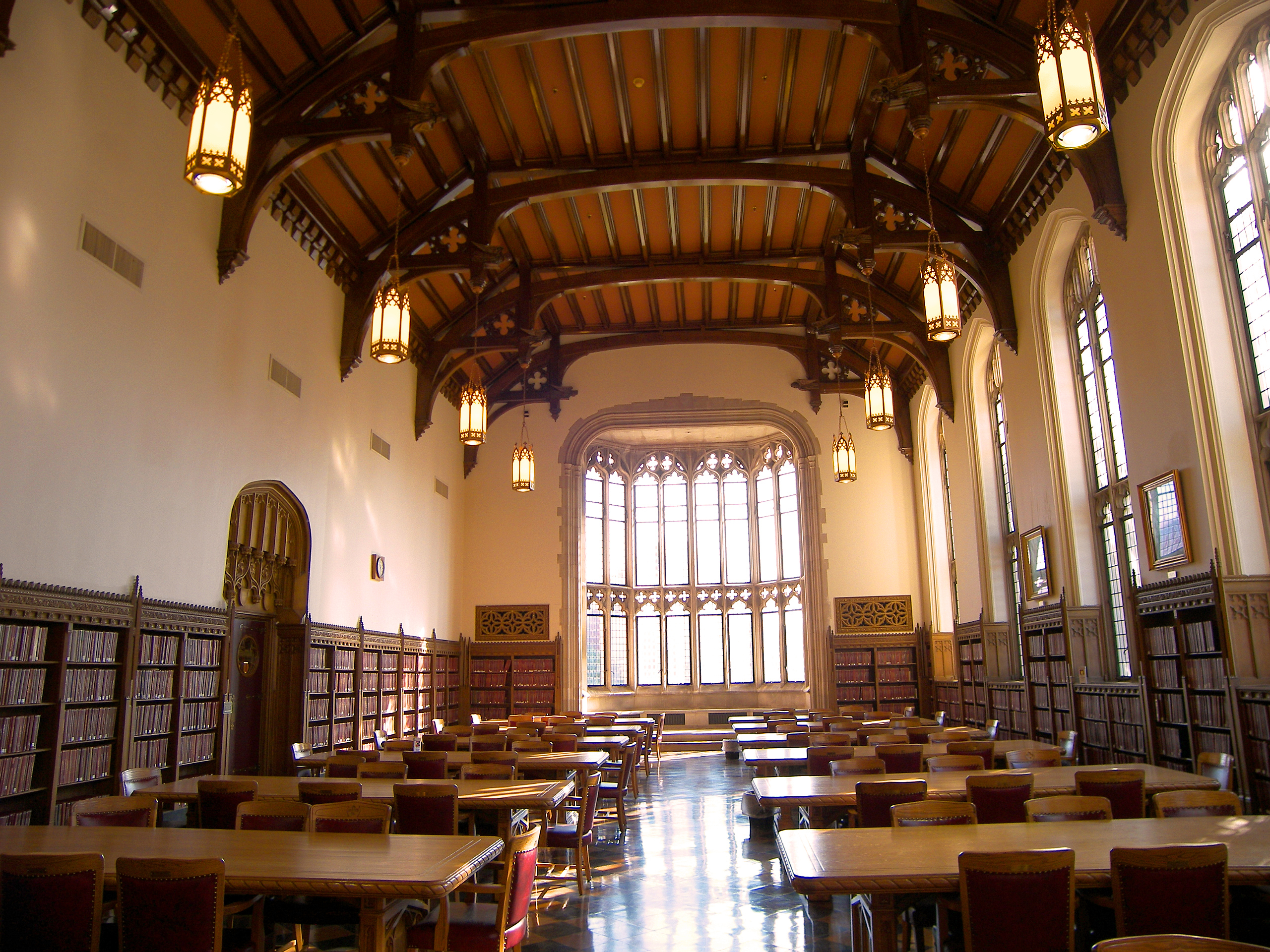
The Great Reading Room in 2006.

The library is historically significant for its association with the racial desegregation court case of George McLaurin, a retired black professor who applied to the university to pursue a doctorate in education. McLaurin was at first denied admission to the university solely on the basis of race, in accordance with Oklahoma law at the time. After a court ruling, he was admitted, but under the separate but equal doctrine he was given a desk in the mezzanine of this building, rather than being allowed use of the regular reading room. He appealed the segregation up to the Supreme Court, in McLaurin v. Oklahoma State Regents for Higher Education. In this, and a companion cases, Sweatt v. Painter, the Supreme Court limited Plessy v. Ferguson. The decisions were precedents for the more famous Brown v. Board of Education case in 1954.

For its association with segregation and the court case overturning it, the building was declared a National Historic Landmark in 2001.

== See also ==
- List of National Historic Landmarks in Oklahoma
- National Register of Historic Places listings in Cleveland County, Oklahoma
