= William Balser Skirvin =

American real estate developer and oil millionaire

William Balser Skirvin (November 10, 1860 – March 25, 1944) was an American real estate developer and oil millionaire. He is best known for his establishment of the Skirvin Hotel, an Oklahoma City landmark now listed on the National Register of Historic Places.

Born near Sturgis, Michigan, Skirvin left for the Oklahoma Territory in 1889 as an original 89er. He and a business partner acquired, and then sold, property in the new territorial capital of Guthrie, then moved to Galveston, Texas to engage in the real estate business. Skirvin developed the town of Alta Loma, and was present in Galveston at the time of the 1900 Galveston hurricane. Skirvin also engaged in the oil business with considerable success.

Skirvin returned to Oklahoma in 1906 to engage in both oil and real estate endeavors. In 1910-1911 he built the Skirvin Hotel; he and his children lived in a suite on the ninth floor. Repeatedly expanded, the hotel became the city's best known, and a center of its political and business life. In 1931 he and his family began a second hotel, the Skirvin Tower, but due to the economic instability of the era, it was not completed until 1938; it was converted into an office building in the 1970s.

Skirvin's wife Harriett Reid Skirvin had died in 1908, leaving Skirvin with their three children. His daughter, Perle Mesta, married a wealthy Pittsburgh businessman; widowed in 1925, she inherited her husband's fortune and became a socialite, political hostess, and U.S. ambassador to Luxembourg (1949–1953) under President Harry S Truman.

Skirvin was severely injured in an auto accident on March 12, 1944, and died on March 25.
