= Skirvin Hilton Hotel =

Hotel in Oklahoma City, Oklahoma

The Skirvin Hilton Oklahoma City
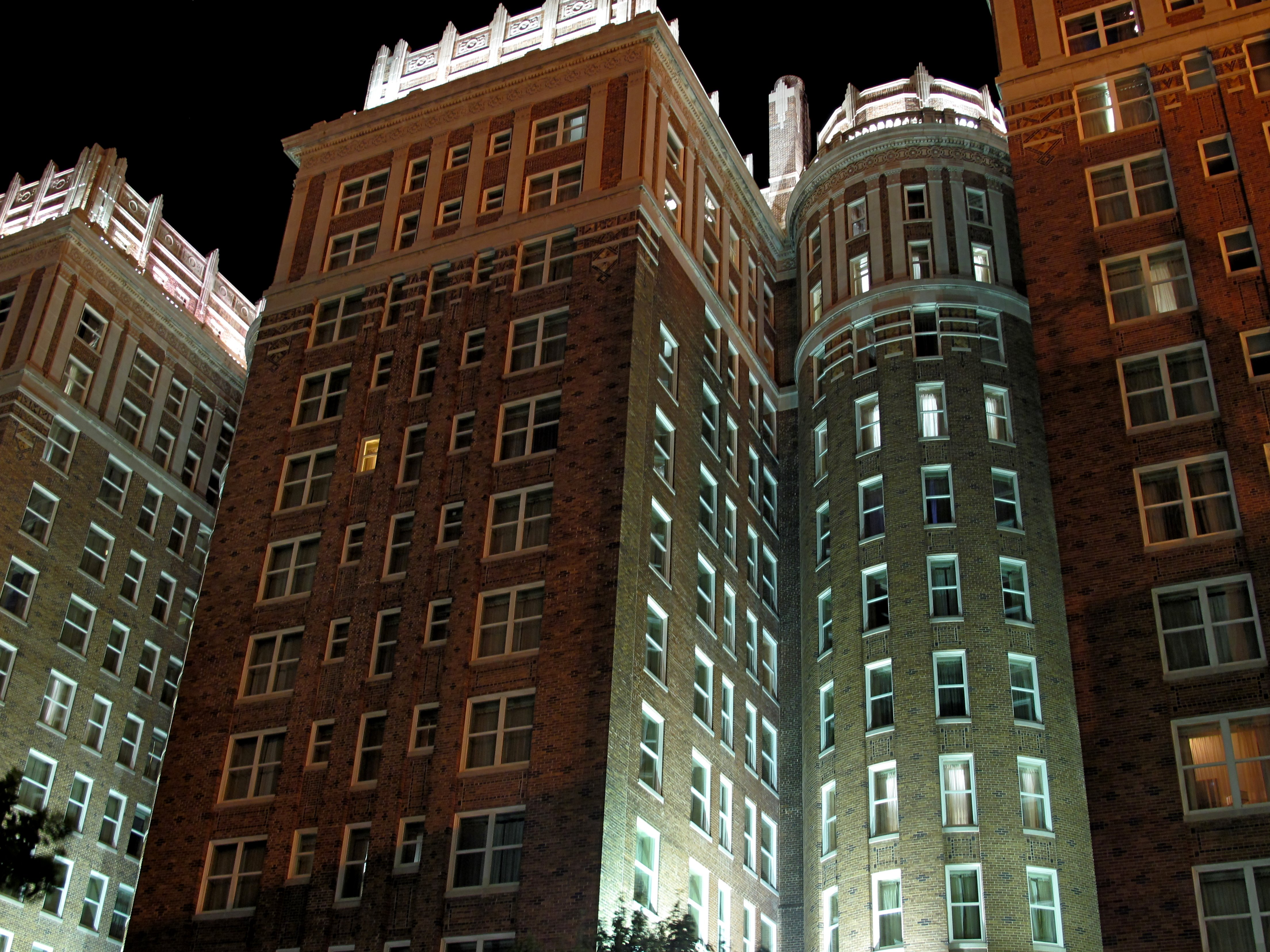
- Interactive map of the The Skirvin Hilton Oklahoma City area

General information
- Location: 1 Park Avenue; Oklahoma City, Oklahoma 73102; United States
- Opening: September 26, 1911 (Skirvin Hotel); 2007 (renovation and reopening)
- Closed: 1988 for renovation and improvement
- Owner: Ortus Hotel Investments; LLC, Sovereign Properties Holdco, LLC
- Operator: Marcus Hotels & Resorts, Inc.

Technical details
- Floor count: 13

Design and construction
- Architects: Solomon Layton; Hicks & Forsyth; Kahler Slater

Other information
- Number of rooms: 225
- Number of suites: 20
- Number of restaurants: 1
- Parking: Valet
- Skirvin Hotel
- U.S. National Register of Historic Places
- Location within Oklahoma Location within the United States
- Location: 1 Park Avenue, Oklahoma City, OK 73102
- Coordinates: 35°28′8″N 97°30′49″W
- Area: 1 acre (0.4 ha)
- Built: 1911
- NRHP reference No.: 79002010
- Added to NRHP: October 10, 1979

Website
- www.skirvinhilton.com

The Skirvin Hilton Oklahoma City is a historic 13-story, 225-room hotel in downtown Oklahoma City. It is the city's oldest hotel and is listed on the National Register of Historic Places.

The hotel is managed by Marcus Hotels & Resorts under the Hilton brand, and is a member of Historic Hotels of America, the official program of the National Trust for Historic Preservation.

== History ==
The Skirvin Hotel opened on September 26, 1911, with 224 rooms in a ten-story two-winged tower. A third 12-story wing was added in 1925, and in 1929–30 all three wings were raised up to 13 floors, with a total of 525 rooms. The hotel is named for its founder, William Balser "Bill" Skirvin, whose daughter, Perle Mesta, became the ambassador to Luxembourg under Harry Truman. Former President and Candidate Theodore Roosevelt spoke to a large crowd of supporters from a balcony of the Skirvin Hotel on September 24, 1912 during his tour through Oklahoma as a Bull Moose Party candidate.

In 1945, the Skirvin Hotel and Skirvin Tower were sold to local hotelier Dan James. Over the years, James executed several renovation works to revitalize the hotel and attract tourists visiting Oklahoma. Some of the new amenities included air conditioning, a new swimming pool, and new furniture. The hotel closed in 1988, due to low occupancy. For the next 19 years, it sat abandoned.

In 1999, Oklahoma City Mayor Kirk Humphreys appointed a Skirvin Solutions Committee, to evaluate whether the historic building could be saved. The committee started by touring other restored historic hotels, looking at how those projects were paid for, and recommended in October 2000 that the City of Oklahoma City explore creating a public-private partnership to re-open the Skirvin. In May 2002, Oklahoma City acquired the building, for $2.875 million and issued a request for proposals from potential developers late that same year. Partners in Development, a firm put together by principal John Weeman, made a proposal to renovate the building for $42.1 million and to re-open it as a full-service Hilton-branded hotel, operated by Marcus Hotels and Resorts. The Oklahoma City Urban Renewal Authority selected Partners in Development as the developer in January 2004. Weeman bought the building from Oklahoma City in 2005. Using money he invested, plus funds from various other public sources, including tax increment financing, grants, Empowerment Zone credits, historic tax credits and New Markets tax credits, he completed its renovation for about $51 million.

The Skirvin Hilton re-opened in 2007. The renovation project restored the original exterior finish, installed historically accurate windows, reconfigured guest rooms and added new guest elevators. The larger rooms brought the number of rooms down to 225 with 22,000 square feet (2,000 m^{2}) of meeting rooms and common areas.

In 2022, the hotel was sold to a joint venture of Ortus Hotel Investments, LLC (a group of local investors), and the Chickasaw Nation's Sovereign Properties Holdco, LLC.

In 2025, the hotel completed a $22 million renovation.

== Haunting ==
Rumors of a haunting in the hotel persist, and have been cited by National Basketball Association (NBA) teams. The most notable examples occurred in 2010, when the New York Knicks famously blamed their loss to the Oklahoma City Thunder on the haunting and when the Chicago Bulls reported doors slamming shut on their own and strange sounds outside their rooms. The story received national attention again in June 2012, when the Miami Heat were staying in the hotel for the NBA Finals. More recently, the Baylor Lady Bears, who were the defending National Collegiate Athletic Association (NCAA) Division I women's basketball champions, were put up at the Skirvin. In one of the biggest upsets in tournament history, the Lady Bears unexpectedly lost 82–81 to Louisville in the regional semifinals of the 2013 NCAA Division I women's basketball tournament. In January 2019, Brooklyn Nets star Kyrie Irving announced that he was producing a feature film about the purported paranormal activity at the hotel.

Room 1015 is rumored to be the most haunted room in the hotel. As the story goes, the hotel's original owner, W. B. Skirvin, had an affair with a maid named "Effie", which led to a pregnancy. To protect his reputation and avoid a scandal, Skirvin locked the maid in room 1015. She eventually jumped out a window, killing herself and the baby. To avoid negative press attention, the death was written off as a suicide by a saleswoman who killed herself.

Over the years, hotel staff say they have seen objects moving by themselves and have heard strange noises at night. According to Steve Lackmeyer (who also co-wrote a book about the hotel) and Jason Kersey (both reporters from The Oklahoman), Skirvin was "a notorious womanizer and drinker" and the 10th floor was known for various incidents of gambling and other vices, but there is no real-life evidence corresponding to the "Effie" story: Skirvin's family did believe that he had an employee (his assistant and bookkeeper, Mabel Luty) who was also his mistress, but she outlived him.

== See also ==
- List of Historic Hotels of America
