= Neighborhoods of Oklahoma City =

The City of Oklahoma City uses Special Zoning Districts as a tool to maintain the character of many neighborhood communities.

== Downtown ==
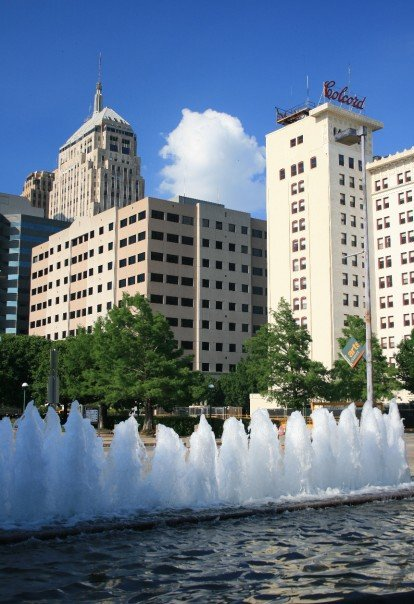
Downtown Oklahoma City.

Downtown Oklahoma City itself is currently undergoing a renaissance. Between the mid-1980s and 1990s, downtown was unchanged and largely vacant. It was the scene of the bombing of the Alfred P. Murrah Federal Building on 5th Street between Robinson and Harvey Avenues, caused by convicted domestic terrorist Timothy McVeigh; most buildings within a 1-mile (1.6 km) radius were structurally damaged by the explosion, including the old Journal Record Building (now home to the National Memorial museum). Many other buildings, such as the unique international style YMCA building, supposedly one of few remaining in the United States were damaged or destroyed.

White flight during the 1950s and 1960s left much of the inner city abandoned. During the Urban Renewal days of the early 1980s, controversial urban planning allowed for the destruction of almost 50 historic buildings and skyscrapers. Examples include the Biltmore Hotel, which was imploded to make way for the I. M. Pei-designed Myriad Botanical Gardens, the only major Urban Renewal project completed as planned. Many of the buildings which were not destroyed in the Central Business District were covered by new façades or left to Class-C office space. The removal of historic structures left downtown without much retail presence.

The Myriad Gardens.

In stark contrast to the promise of Urban Renewal, Downtown had not seen a new skyscraper or any sort of major construction project for many years. The last major skyscraper built downtown was the First Oklahoma Tower in 1982 and the Leadership Square complex built in 1984. Leadership Square was originally intended to be a single 60+ floor skyscraper but was later scaled down to two connected towers due to economic downturn.

Downtown and surrounding areas such as Bricktown and Midtown have seen a significant revival in the wake of the MAPS program, which created new venues and attractions in the downtown area. Today, as Downtown and the Central Business District continue in their economic revival, there are numerous condo and apartment developments being built around downtown, along with older buildings that are being converted into apartments and hotels. Leading this charge is the renovation of the historic Skirvin Hotel, where numerous presidents and dignitaries have stayed. The historic Colcord Building, Oklahoma City's first skyscraper, was also converted from office space to a boutique hotel in 2006.

Devon Energy, which had previously been occupying space in five separate downtown buildings, revealed plans in August 2008 for a new 1,900,000-square-foot (180,000 m^{2}), 925-foot (282 m)-tall skyscraper at the corner of Sheridan and Hudson, a space originally planned for a "Galleria" mall under the Pei urban renewal plan. The building is expected to bring new life to the west side of downtown, which has seen less growth compared to Bricktown on the eastern edge and Midtown to the north. The Devon Tower, which became the tallest building in the state of Oklahoma at 844 feet (257 m), was completed in 2012.

Other development projects, which are either in planning or have since been completed, include:

- $100 million in proposed improvements to the Ford Center were approved by voters in March 2008. The improvements allowed for offices and new locker rooms for the Oklahoma City Thunder NBA team, new restaurants and bars, rooftop terraces, a new grand entrance, and a family fun center.
- Block 42 is a high-end condominium project offering luxury condos with a modern, urban aesthetic. The project was completed in the summer of 2008.
- The Hill is a project with almost 200 town homes being built on a hill overlooking the Deep Deuce district and Bricktown. The project is currently under construction.
- The Triangle (encompassing the Flatiron District and some of Deep Deuce) is a project by TAP Architecture that will include 700 loft units, office and retail space.
- The Central Avenue Villas which has 30 loft units.
- A new Hampton Inn and Suites in Bricktown.

The area due south of the Paycom Center is anticipated to become OKC's latest downtown district following the long overdue move of the I-40 Crosstown bridge that is in the process of being completed as of 2013. The master plan for the "Core to Shore" area shows a boulevard running through downtown – where the original alignment of the Crosstown bridge was located, as well as a large new city park stretching from the Myriad Botanical Gardens down to the Oklahoma River. It is also assumed that the Central Business District would be extended south, and new highrise construction will take place there.

=== Bricktown ===
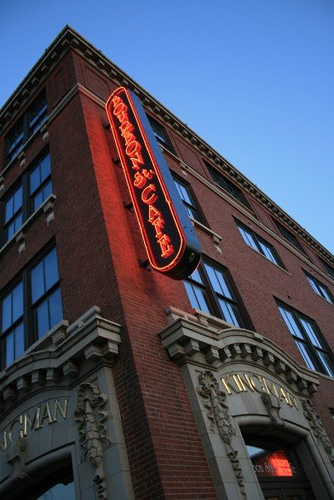
The Bourbon St. Cafe in Bricktown.

Bricktown is an entertainment district located on the east side of Downtown Oklahoma City. Before a recent renaissance, the area was a warehouse district that had begun to get run down. Today, it is bustling with restaurants, dance clubs, live music venues, upscale retail shops, and offices. Top attractions include the Chickasaw Bricktown Ballpark and a navigable Bricktown Canal, both the result of the city's MAPS projects.

The Bricktown Canal stretches one mile (1.6 km) through the district toward to a new park past the Oklahoma Land Run Monument. When completed, the Land Run Monument will be a series of 77 giant statues stretching over an area the size of two football fields on the south canal, and will be one of the largest sculptural monuments in the world.

Lower Bricktown (a newly constructed area south of existing warehouses) boasts a brand-new 16-screen movie complex and several upscale retail establishments and restaurants. The Centennial on the Canal is Bricktown's first new residential construction, and contains three levels of high-end condos with retail on the canal and street levels. The area also includes the corporate headquarters of Sonic Drive-In.

The brick buildings of the district were created between 1898 and 1930 to aid in the freight operations by the four major railroad companies that used the area. Oklahoma City's first black newspaper, the Black Dispatch was officed in Bricktown at 228 E. First, along with the first local branch of the National Association for the Advancement of Colored People.

=== Deep Deuce ===
Deep Deuce, located directly north of Bricktown, ignited the downtown urban housing boom in the late 1990s with the Deep Deuce Apartments. The area consists mostly of low-rise apartment buildings and various formerly vacant mixed use buildings. Deep Deuce was once the largest African-American neighborhood downtown in the 1940s and 1950s and was the regional center of culture and jazz music. Bands such as the Count Basie Orchestra, the Blue Devils, the Charlie Christian Band, and others resided in this downtown neighborhood. It is also noteworthy that Reverend Martin Luther King Jr. was rejected for an executive position at the Calvary Baptist Church in Deep Deuce for being "too young."

Much of the original neighborhood was bulldozed to make way for the I-235 Centennial Expressway in the late 1980s. While the area was neglected during the 1990s, the downtown renaissance has made the area attractive to developers, despite how little remains of the neighborhood's earlier character and architecture. The first phase of The Triangle (a large masterplanned community between Bricktown, the elevated railroad tracks, and I-235) is the Brownstones at Maywood Park, which includes three- to five-story brownstones over several blocks of Deep Deuce, along with a park and a large sculpture. Also in the construction or planning phases are several other residential developments, including The Lofts at Maywood Park, Block 42, The Hill, Central Ave. Villas, and Flatiron Lofts. The area is also home to the Oklahoma City campus of Oklahoma Baptist University. All these newly developed properties have rental prices a minimum of 150% of the average income per capita of the populace of the state.

=== The Arts District ===
The Oklahoma City Museum of Art.

The area now known as the Arts District wraps around part of west downtown that encompasses the Civic Center Music Hall, the Oklahoma City Museum of Art, the Myriad Botanical Gardens, Stage Center, the Ron Norick Downtown Library, several local theaters, headquarters of the American Choral Directors Association and at its northern edge, the Oklahoma City National Memorial. The district is also home to the nation's third largest arts festival, the annual Festival of the Arts. The area saw new residential development open several years ago when developers converted a former Montgomery Ward department store into condominiums, and in 2007 with Legacy Summit at Arts Central, a $40-million, 200-unit across from the Civic Center Music Hall. Also in this district is City Hall, the art-deco Oklahoma County Courthouse, and the central station for Metro Transit buses.

=== Film Row ===
The Film Exchange District encompasses 42 square blocks and lies between Classen Boulevard and Walker Avenue along Sheridan Avenue. It is also bordered by S.W. 2nd Street, SW 1st Street and Colcord Drive. The district's history includes the likes of Warner Bros., Paramount Pictures, Metro-Goldwyn-Mayer, and Fox Films starting with silent films. The first film exchange appeared in Oklahoma City as early as 1907, and in 1910, the General Film Exchange was established on West 2nd Street.

Paramount Pictures operated at 123 S.W. 3rd and by 1929 relocated to 701 W. Grand (Sheridan Ave.), now in the heart of the Film Exchange District and backed the opening of the Plaza Theatre in 1935. By 1930, most studio offices had moved along what is now Sheridan Avenue.

The 1930s came to know the area as Film Row, where theater owners came to screen and lease films for their movie houses. J. Eldon Peek, a graduate student of Oklahoma State University, and his wife Maxine opened the Oklahoma Theatre Supply Company and Missouri Theatre Supply Company at 708 W. Grand (Sheridan) in 1930. By 1988, she and her granddaughter Sharon Allen were still operating the business, which closed in 2004. The Peeks landed contracts to install sound systems in former silent theatres across Oklahoma and relocated to their newly constructed building at 628 W. Grand (Sheridan) in 1946.

In the 1950s, cable television first came to Oklahoma in Bartlesville, where the "Telemovies" system was started by Video Independent Theatres. Television and the advent of new technology and introduction of inexpensive air freight, hurt the film exchange business and by the 1970s and early 1980s, film row became a haven for bars, prostitution and drugs. Several of the historic buildings in the district are now listed on the National Register of Historic Places. In 2003, a part of downtown Oklahoma City was developed into the new Film Row, to honor its roots as a film exchange district.

In 2003, a part of downtown Oklahoma City was developed into the new Film Exchange District, to honor its roots as a film exchange. In August 2011, Oklahoma City: Film Row was published under Arcadia Publishing's Images of America series. The book was written by historian Bradley Wynn.

In 2025, the last remaining film exchange building in Film Row re-opened as the Oklahoma Film Exchange.

== Midtown ==
Midtown is the area roughly bounded by 4th Street to the south, I-235 to the east, 22nd Street to the north, and Pennsylvania Avenue to the west. Central Midtown is the area south of N.W. 13th Street, and north of 6th Street between Robinson and Classen. Like much of the inner city, Midtown is also experiencing a “renaissance” of its own, although some believe the changes more closely represent gentrification.

In the inner city, there are many heritage conversions and new construction projects. Central Midtown is the area around N.W. 10th and North Walker. A number of new housing developments and numerous heritage building conversions where abandoned hotels and retail structures are being renovated into upscale condos, lofts, and apartments are taking place and continue to be announced. This area includes the historic Plaza Court building, St. Anthony Hospital, and the SoSA neighborhood.

=== Automobile Alley ===
This Midtown neighborhood (also known as "A-Alley" for short) along Broadway Avenue in Northeast Downtown was a popular retail district in the 1920s and was home to most of Oklahoma City's car dealerships. The area declined with the rest of Downtown in the 1960s and 1970s. Today, there is a considerable effort to turn Automobile Alley into Oklahoma City's newest upscale urban neighborhood. Efforts to redevelop the area will transform the showrooms and storefronts of Automobile Alley into upscale lofts, galleries, and offices.

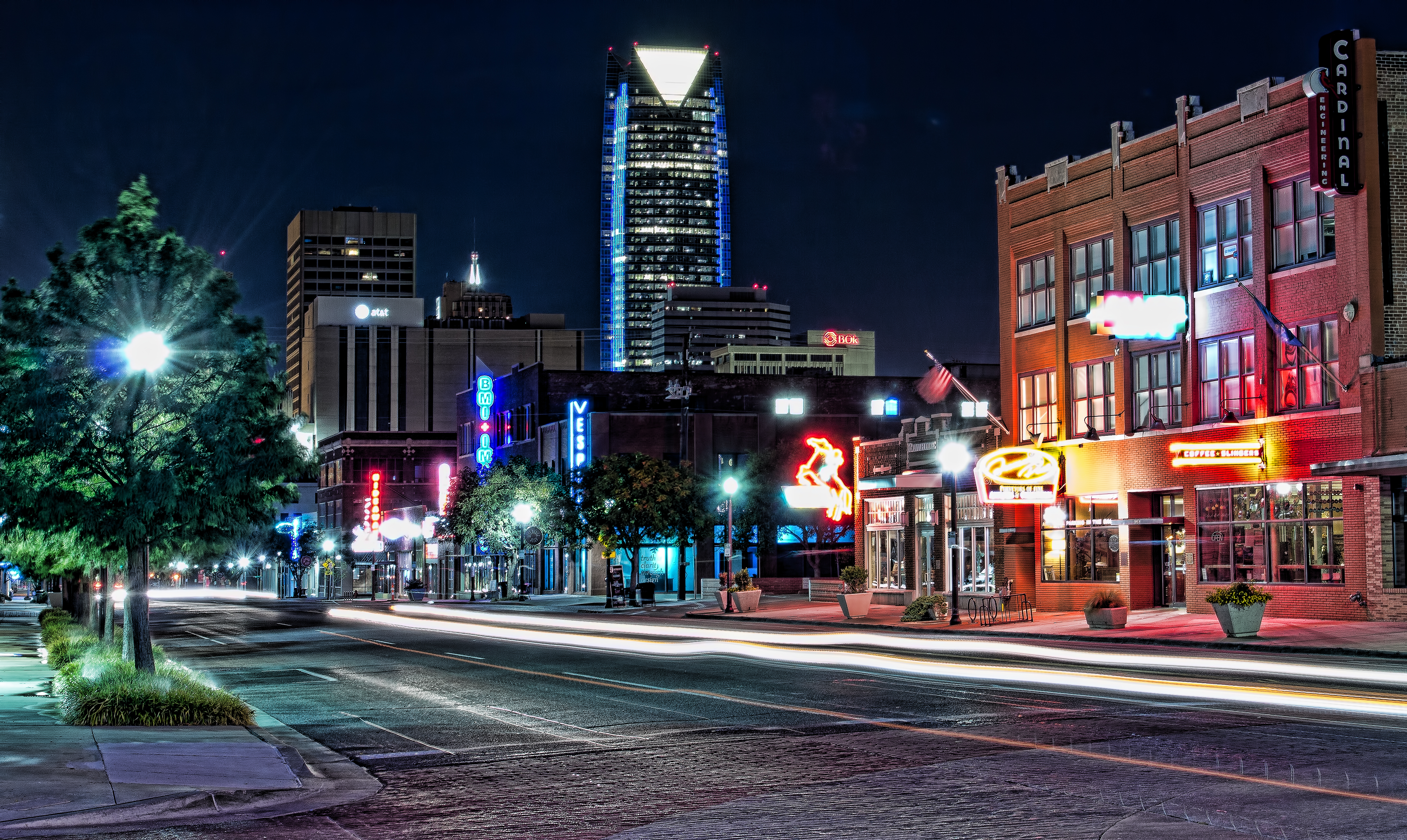
Automobile Alley in Oklahoma City.

Also in the area are many of downtown's earliest churches along Robinson Ave. (known as "Church Row") in Midtown, the flagship store for the CD Warehouse chain, and the downtown YMCA, which had to be rebuilt following the bombing of the Murrah building.

=== Plaza District ===
In the 1920s, a commercial niche formed along N.W. 16th Street between Blackwelder and Indiana Avenues. This development was in response to the area's location at the end of the trolley line as well as the growth of neighborhoods around the district. With the addition of the Plaza Theatre in the mid-1930s, the area became known as the Plaza District.

Located off NW 16th Street between Classen Ave. and Pennsylvania Ave., today the Plaza District is a neighborhood commercial district boasting Oklahoma City's local arts flavor and is home to art galleries, studios, retail shops, restaurants, and creative services. Several local businesses in this area are owned by young, creative entrepreneurs. The area is home to the renovated Plaza Theatre, which holds music and theatrical performances for Lyric at the Plaza. Also included in the area are the artist-made retail businesses, a quality custom tattoo shop, a popular local salon, a full-production modern local winery, and many shops for vintage and retro items. This district, once blighted by urban decay now boasts a renewed energy embraced by Oklahoma City's youth and diverse culture. Each second Friday of each month from 7-11 p.m., the district is home to "LIVE on the Plaza", a monthly artwalk featuring live music, featured artists, special events and local shopping.

The Plaza District is nestled between two neighborhoods, Gatewood Historic District on the north (16th, Classen, 23rd and Penn) and Classen Ten Penn Neighborhood on the south (Classen, 10th, Penn and 16th).

=== Heritage Hills & Mesta Park ===
The Heritage Hills neighborhood led the charge of development in the area, with wealthy businessmen and doctors restoring formerly abandoned oil mansions located north of downtown, between N. 13th and N. 22nd Streets. The Overholser Mansion and the Hales Mansion are located in Heritage Hills. Mesta Park to its west, is a slightly more affordable neighborhood located between N. Walker Ave. and N. Classen Blvd. It has also seen significant development. The entire inner city north central area is a patchwork of historic mansions and retail streetscapes that is a pleasant mix of urban grit and heritage residential monuments. Both Heritage Hills Historic District and Mesta Park along with Gatewood neighborhoods are on the National Register of Historic Places and are designated as Historic Preservation District and Historic Landmark Overlay Districts.

=== Cottage District ===
Cottage District is a neighborhood known for its unique mix of architecture and edgy style. It is an eclectic inner-city neighborhood characterized by a mix of early 20th century era cottages, blight, and striking contemporary architecture. Officially called the "Cottage District" by the City of Oklahoma City, "SOSA", (an acronym for "South of Saint Anthony") has become the district's popular name. Situated on the northwest corner of the Central Business District, SoSA is roughly bordered by Classen Boulevard, Walker Street, NW 6th Street, and NW 9th Street. The neighborhood still has pockets of blight, but spurred by the rehabilitation of two 1906 residential buildings in 2002, it has begun to transform its unsavory reputation. As of 2010, there are seven architect-designed residences within a two block radius, and three more in progress. The high density of architect-occupied, contemporary dwellings has caused some to call it "the architect's ghetto."

== Uptown ==
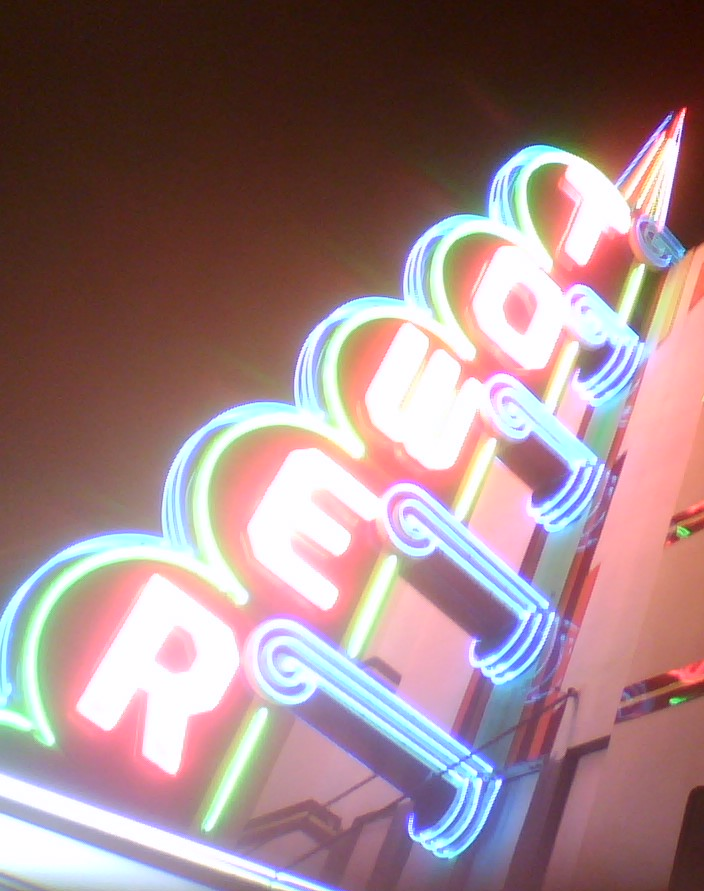
Tower Theater Oklahoma City.

Further north is Uptown, bounded roughly by N.W. 23rd Street on the south, I-235 on the east, I-44 on the north and Pennsylvania Ave on the west. The area is home to historic tree-lined neighborhoods, Oklahoma City University, and numerous ethnic shops and gritty enclaves.

N.W. 23rd, Classen Boulevard, Western Avenue and N.W. 39th west of Classen Blvd. are all current or historic alignments of U.S. Route 66 that snake through Uptown. This stretch is characterized by small Art Deco storefronts, repurposed bungalows, and Route 66 icons such as the Milk Bottle Building, the Gold Dome, and the neon signs of the Tower and Will Rogers Theaters.

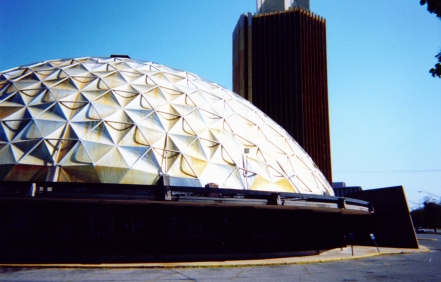
Gold Dome and "The Classen" buildings of the city's Asian District.

=== Asian District ===
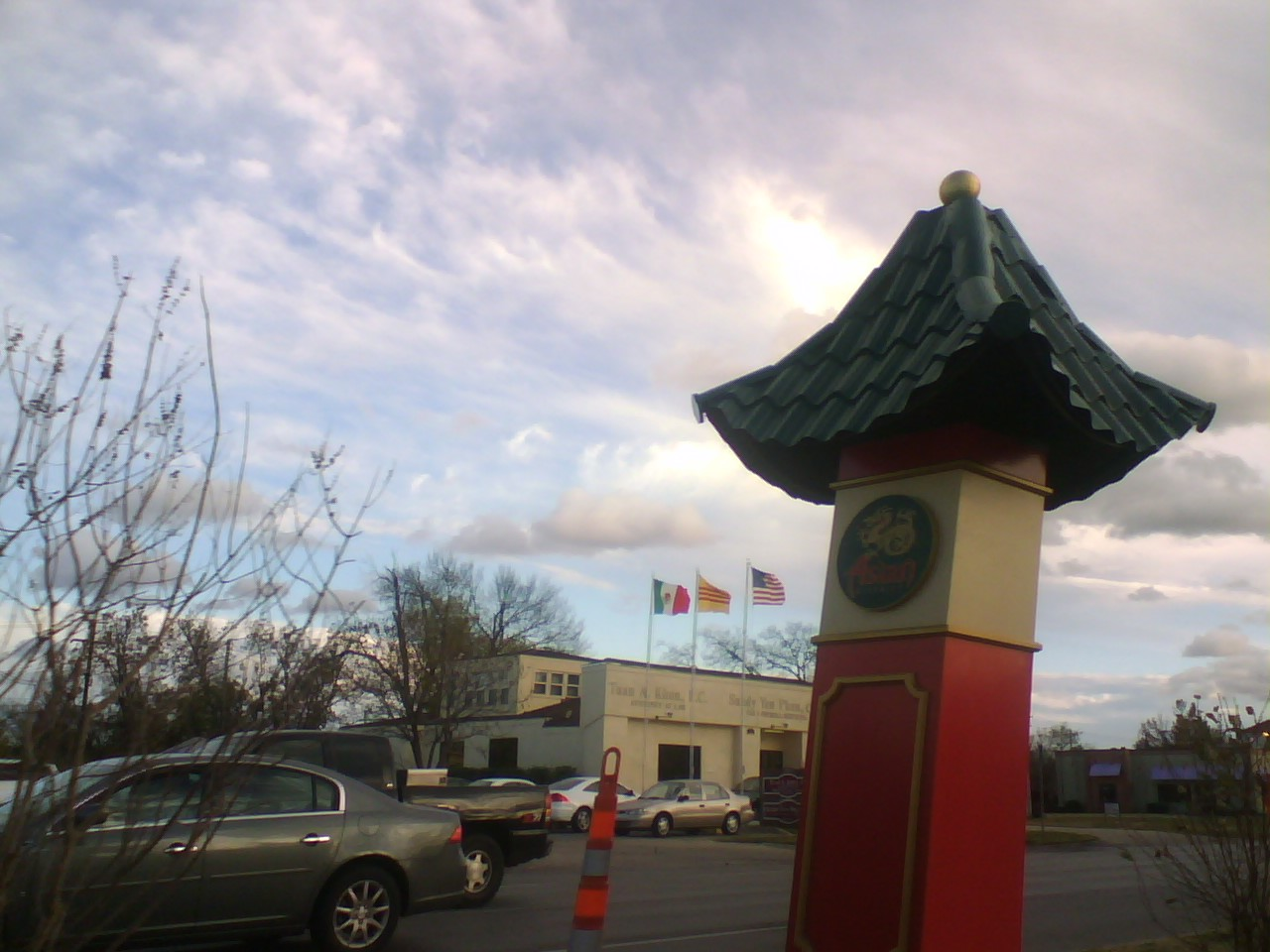
Pagoda along Classen Blvd. in the Asian District.

Oklahoma City has the largest Asian population in the state and is home to a rapidly growing cultural area, officially deemed Asia District, and more locally known as 'The Asian District.' Many cultures from all over Asia are represented in the shops and restaurants as well as the neighboring residential and commercial areas. The district is also referred to as 'Little Saigon' by local residents, as it was and still is popularly known, despite the official renaming as the 'Asian District.'

Centered primarily along Classen Boulevard from N.W. 22nd Street to N.W. 30th, the region is a culturally diverse Chinatown community, with the strongest visually identifiable influence being Vietnamese. Tens of thousands of Vietnamese refugees settled in the city during the 1970s after the fall of Saigon, leading the revival of what had previously been a declining neighborhood following a suburban "white flight" exodus of middle class residents. As the new Asian residents rebuilt the community, more immigrants moved into the area from countries beyond just Vietnam and Southeast Asia. It is now home to residents from all around the world.

=== The Paseo ===
Storefronts along the Paseo

The Paseo Arts District was built in 1929 as the first commercial shopping district North of downtown Oklahoma City. The Spanish village with its stucco buildings and clay tile roofs is the home of Oklahoma City's Artists' community, the only such district in the state.

Although the Paseo Arts District is in the near north quadrant of the city, it is quite central to Oklahoma City's most diverse and cultural neighborhoods. Located along Paseo Drive at roughly N. Walker Ave and N.W. 28th Street, the district is home to a number of bars and nightclubs as well as numerous upscale/ethnic restaurants and grills. The area also plays host to an annual Paseo Arts Festival in the spring, usually occurring on Memorial Day weekend.

The larger Paseo Historic Neighborhood area extends between Shartel and Walker, from N.W. 30 to about N.W. 25. In the immediate area are several historic neighborhoods including Mesta Park, Gatewood, Edgemere, Jefferson Park, and Heritage Hills. To the west of the Paseo is the Northwest Business District and the NW 39th Enclave and the Eastside is due east. Immediately southwest of the Paseo is the city's Chinatown/Little Saigon neighborhood known as Asia District as well as Oklahoma City University. The Paseo was originally developed by Dr. G. A. Nichols, who also developed the Nichols Hills neighborhood.

=== Crown Heights–Edgemere Heights ===
In October 1930, in an area that was part of the original golf course of the Oklahoma City Golf & Country Club, the first Crown Heights lots were offered for sale. Crown Heights is bounded by Western and Walker; it begins on the north side of 36th and includes the north side of 42nd. Edgemere Heights was developed in the 1940s and 1950s; it is bounded on the south and east by the Deep Fork Creek (and I-235), on the west by Crown Heights and has the same north–south borders.

In 1973, the Crown Heights - Edgemere Heights Homeowners Association was founded to promote fellowship, preservation and beautification. The Security Association founded in the 1980s provides 24-hour armed patrol and the area maintains a very low crime rate. In 1980, CH-EH Improvement, Inc., a 501(c)3 charity, was formed for "the improvement of conditions" in CH-EH.

=== Western Avenue Corridor ===
The Western Avenue district extends from N.W. 36th to just north of Wilshire Boulevard and encompasses the Shartel and Classen Curve areas. The area is defined by a business improvement district which area merchants established in order to assesses property owners for additional public and marketing services. The Western Avenue Association provides marketing services for the merchants of District. Many energy-related businesses have offices in the area, including Chesapeake Energy, L.L.C., one of the metro's largest employers.

=== 39th Street Enclave ===
Oklahoma City has the state's largest gay/lesbian population and gay village, known as the NW 39th Street Enclave or District 39 or simply "The Gayborhood". As with many of OKC's neighborhoods, the lack of established boundaries makes it hard to give an exact location, but generally speaking, this community is principally located along N.W. 39th Street between Pennsylvania Avenue and Youngs Street, although there are many gay-friendly businesses organizations and neighborhoods diffused throughout the surrounding area of the city.

The NW 39th Street Enclave rivals Bricktown in terms of sheer volume of clubs, bars, and nightlife and nearly 200 rooms all at the District motel, (formerly the Habana Inn). 39th Street is also home to the annual PRIDE celebration and other attractions.

== Inner City South and the Oklahoma River ==
"Inner City South" is used to describe the neighborhoods south of new Interstate 40 alignment to the areas within and immediately around South Grand Boulevard.

=== Boathouse District ===
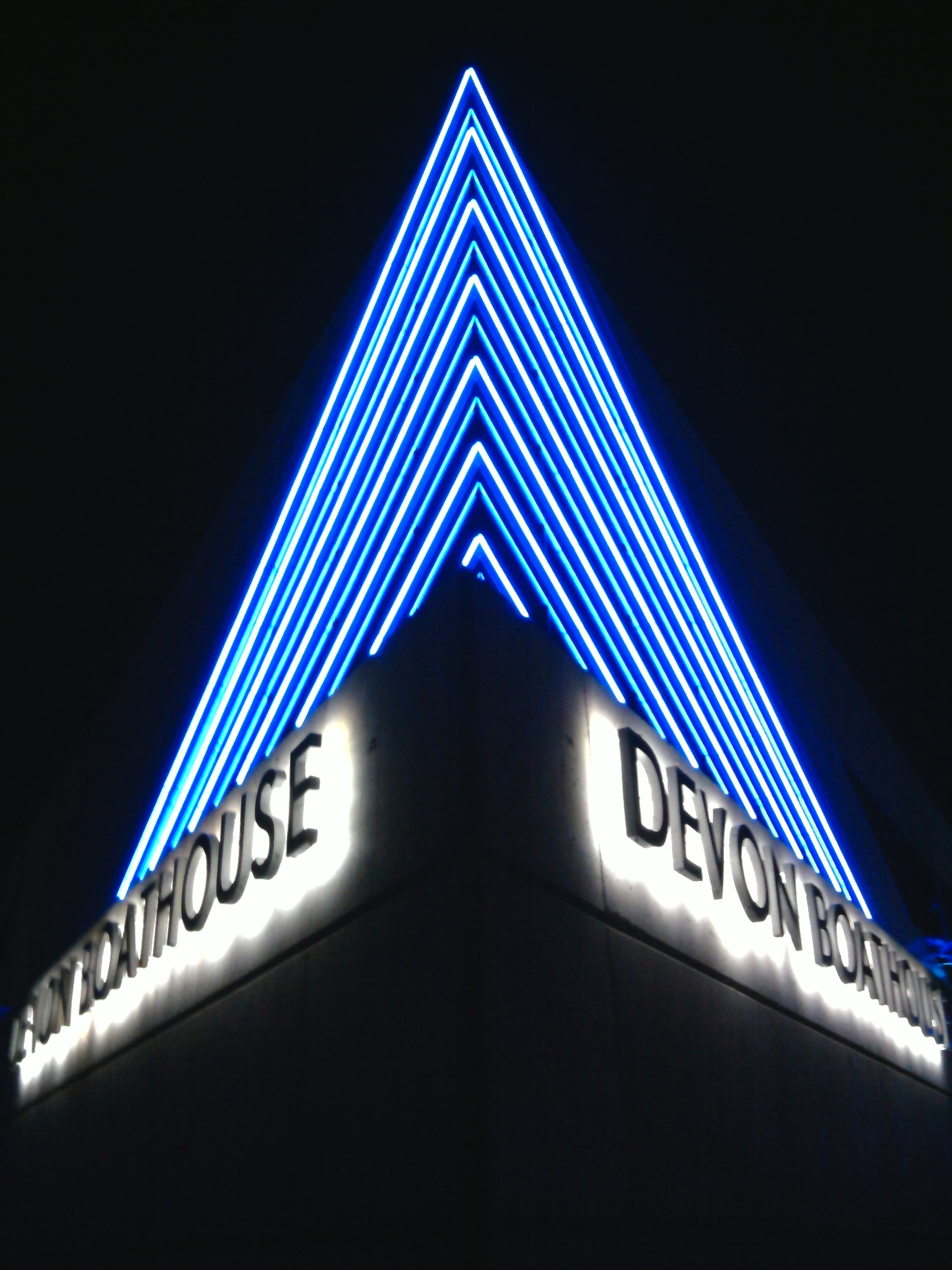
Devon Boathouse

North of Capitol Hill and due south of downtown Oklahoma City, the Boathouse District promises to be yet another major urban area for Oklahoma City made developable by the renovation of the Oklahoma River. The area north of the Oklahoma River is part of Oklahoma City's Core to Shore redevelopment area has a master plan that shows public park and recreation space, residential neighborhoods, office parks, several "urban waterfronts" and river taxi docks along the waterfront. The recently completed Chesapeake Boathouse is a new Oklahoma City landmark on the Oklahoma River and a promising symbol for the Riverside District. The Oklahoma Boat House Foundation is the sponsoring organization for the US Olympic & Paralympic Training Site for both rowing and canoe/kayak.

The area south of the Oklahoma River contains several parks. This area of Oklahoma City is also home to the Mat Hoffman Action Sports Park of Oklahoma City located at 1700 S. Robinson. The Skate Park is a 26,000-square-foot (2,400 m^{2}) mecca for skateboarders and other extreme sports enthusiasts.

=== Capitol Hill ===
A sports supply store with hand painted sign, Capitol Hill

Capitol Hill is located south of downtown Oklahoma City and borders the Oklahoma River. It was founded as a separate city during the land run and was later annexed into Oklahoma City. (It is not near the State Capitol campus.) It has its own well preserved main street business district along S. W. 25th Street, which has seen a revival in recent years.

=== Stockyards City ===
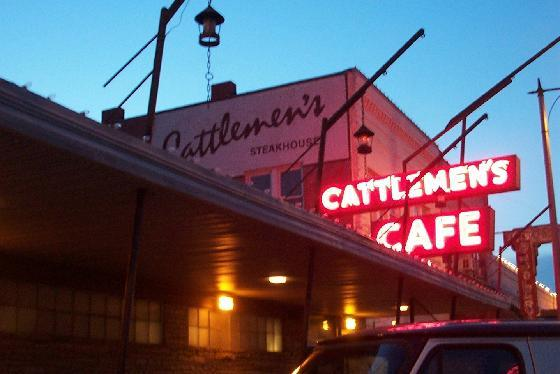
Cattlemen's Steakhouse is a local legend off of Agnew Avenue.

Located at the Agnew Exit South of I-40 and extending to S.W. 15th Street, the Stockyards City area is a unique public/private partnership designed to preserve the early 20th century historic flavor of the area. Many of the businesses in the area date to the 1910 area when the Oklahoma National Stockyards company began its public livestock market. At the heights of its operation during the middle of the 20th Century, the area's meat packing operations represented about 10% of the city's employment. Today, the Oklahoma-National Stockyards the stockyards remains the world's largest stocker and feeder cattle markets.

Historic Stockyards City recaptures the architectural flavor of the early 20th century with gaslights and wooden storefronts. Many businesses in Stockyards City date back to the early 20th century when the area was home to several major meat packing companies. The district still has weekly cattle auctions.

Stockyards City is also home to many western themed shops and boutiques, including the oldest western wear store in Oklahoma.

- The Merchants of the area have established a Business Improvement District that help fund a number of special events that occur in the district, including a Longhorn Cattle Drive each December, sidewalk sales between Thanksgiving and Christmas and the Annual Stockyards Stampede the first weekend in June.
- The Stockyards Urban Design Committee provides preliminary approval of new development, remodel, reconstruction, and building additions
- The area has a Main Street designation

For planning and zoning purposes, the area is divided into several areas:

- Oklahoma River's Scenic River Overlay Design District, Stockyards Section
- Stockyards City Transitional Overlay District (managed by the Stockyards Urban Design Committee)
- Stockyards City Development District (managed by the Stockyards Urban Design Committee)
- Oklahoma National Stockyards Company - original land housing the livestock auction as well as several meet packing plants, not an incorporated part of the City of Oklahoma City

== Northeast Oklahoma City ==
Northeast Oklahoma City is home to Oklahoma's largest African American community. It is located roughly east of I-235 and north of I-40. Neighborhoods in this district include the Medical District and the Lincoln Terrace neighborhood. This district includes the Oklahoma State Capitol, most of the state office buildings, and the Oklahoma Health Center. The district is well known as one of the culinary hubs of Oklahoma City, with world-famous BBQ and soul food being served. Due to gentrification, Northeast Oklahoma City has a mix of low, middle and upper income residents, often within only a few blocks of each other.

=== Adventure District ===
The Adventure District, roughly centered on N.E. 50th and Martin Luther King Avenue in northeast Oklahoma City, is home to many of the city's well-known attractions. These include Science Museum Oklahoma, Oklahoma City Zoo and Botanical Garden, ASA Hall of Fame Complex and Remington Park Racetrack and Casino among other attractions. The "Adventure District" designation was created in 2000 as part of a marketing effort by the various attractions in the area; in 2003, the City of Oklahoma City recognized the area as an official entertainment district.

=== Lincoln Terrace ===
The Lincoln Terrace neighborhood, is a historic and diverse neighborhood in northeast Oklahoma City, located on either side of Lincoln Blvd just south of the Oklahoma State Capitol and north of Oklahoma Health Center. Lincoln Terrace was designated as a Historic Preservation District in 1974. Many of the homes were built in the 1920s. Many of the homes are large two-story houses with spacious interiors, spiral staircases, two to three fireplaces and an abundance of windows. Architecture ranges from Colonial to French and Spanish styles. Many famous individuals have lived in the neighborhood, Senator Robert S. Kerr and Governor Roy Turner are a few notables. The neighborhood was also the home of the Oklahoma City MVS (Mennonite Voluntary Service) house from about 1965–1989 at 504 NE 16th Street (today the location of Joy Mennonite Church).

The Lincoln Terrace Neighborhood Association is aimed at strengthening the beauty, character and friendliness of the neighborhood.

== Northwest ==
=== NW Expressway / Belle Isle Corridor ===
Mayfair and Belle Isle are a pair of neighborhoods built in the 1950’s and 1960’s located near several major employers such as Penn Square Mall and INTEGRIS Baptist Medical Center. The core of Belle Isle, Wilemans Belle Isle, is located just west of Penn Square, north of Northwest Expressway, east of Villa, and south of 63rd Street. Mayfair is located south of Northwest Expressway, flanking both sides of May Avenue between Interstate 44 and Northwest Expressway.

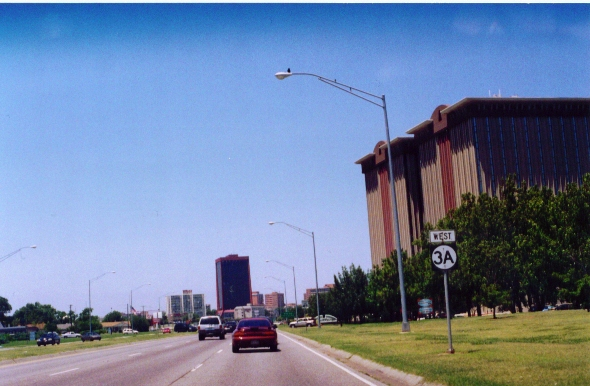
Northwest Expressway, Suburban NW OKC

Northwest Expressway, the city's main artery to the northwestern suburbs, is a congested six-lane boulevard with heavy retail and residential development along it. The Northwest Expressway Corridor includes most of the large scale high-rises, office towers, and hotels outside of downtown (including 360 at Founders Plaza).

The area contains many of Oklahoma City’s largest employers. INTEGRIS Health has a major presence here, with Baptist Medical Center and Baptist Medical Center - Portland Campus located just south of Northwest Expressway, flanking either side of Hefner Parkway. Many energy-related businesses have offices in the area.

=== Nichols Hills and The Village ===
Nichols Hills, located just north of Belle Isle, is an enclave with upscale housing, retail, and restaurants. Nichols Hills Plaza is a vital part of the gradual upscaling of broader Northwest Oklahoma City. Nichols Hills is also home to Oklahoma City Golf & Country Club, as well as numerous large parks.

The Village, located just north of Nichols Hills, is an enclave consisting of more moderately priced post-World War II housing. Property values in The Village have increased in recent years due to its proximity to Nichols Hills, Lake Hefner, and growing upscale retail in the area such as OAK, Penn Square Mall, and Nichols Hills Plaza.

=== Quail Springs/Memorial Corridor ===
At the far northern edge of the city along Memorial Road and the Outer Loop (John Kilpatrick Turnpike), bisected by the Lake Hefner Parkway, is a huge swath of suburban development rapidly creeping toward Edmond, the city's northern suburb.

The area gained its name from the Quail Creek residential development (founded in 1961) and its neighborhood Quail Creek Golf and Country Club. The just under two square mile Quail Creek residential development was one of the country's first neighborhood golf communities and was the vision of developers John W. "Jack" Johntson and his brother Paul Johntson. Work on the development started in 1960, with golf course designed by Floyd Farley and club house designed by Howard, Samis and Davies. Ernie Vossler, the original Golf Pro, later took the neighborhood golf community concept and created the Oak Tree developments (Oak Tree National) in Edmond, Oklahoma, as well as La Quinta Resort developments in the Coachella Valley (Palm Springs, California) area.

Since the early 1980s, this area has been transformed from grazing land and farm prairie into a broad ribbon of office parks, housing tracts, chain restaurants, a regional supermall – Quail Springs Mall, and a great number of strip malls and box stores. Growth here has been brisk, with corporate campuses, golf courses, and shopping centers opening up new opportunities for exploration. The area is also home to the Martin Park Nature Center, a fairly large nature preserve with several hiking trails and much natural wildlife. North of the Memorial Road corridor is Deer Creek, a rapidly growing section of the metro centered on well-regarded schools.

The area is home to some of the Metro's major employers. There is a concentration of health care services in the area, including Mercy Health System, the Oklahoma Heart Hospital as well as the Integris Cancer Institute and its adjoining ProCure Proton Therapy Center. The Quail Springs Business Park houses several hotels and a concentration of corporate administration services.

The Francis Tuttle Technology Center has two campuses in the area. Francis Tuttle is a tax-supported school that offers programs to adults, with career-specific training to maintain a quality workforce. Complete business and industry training and consulting services are offered to local businesses at nominal or no-cost. The general public is offered short-term training for career enhancement or leisure activities.The area is known for its golf courses

The Memorial Corridor is home to one of the most congested intersections in the city, Memorial Road and North Pennsylvania Avenue. However, area is popular due to a wide variety of shopping, dining and entertainment attractions within easy reach.

=== Deer Creek ===
North of the Memorial Road corridor is Deer Creek, a rapidly growing section of the metro centered on well-regarded schools. According to the State Department of Education A-F report cards, every Deer Creek elementary school received an "A" rating in 2013. Deer Creek is known for its schools and many people relocate to Deer Creek specifically for the award-winning public schools.

The Deer Creek area is located northwest of Oklahoma City, just north of the John Kilpatrick Turnpike, between Piedmont and Edmond. Deer Creek is home to many gyms and fitness centers. Much of the development that is going on in the Deer Creek area is happening in the elementary school districts in the Deer Creek catchment area. Especially Spring Creek and Grove Valley (the closest to Oklahoma City and Edmond respectively).

== Westside ==
=== Meridian Avenue "West End" Corridor ===
The Meridian West End Corridor is one of the largest, busiest and most industrially diverse areas of the city. The Corridor extends north of the Will Rogers World Airport to I-40, and from I-44 to Meridian.

The Meridian Avenue "Hospitality" District is along one of the city's busiest arteries, South Meridian Avenue, and extends from mid-tier West Oklahoma City to suburban Southwest Oklahoma City. At the Meridian/I-40 intersection, with its close proximity to the Oklahoma State Fair Park (which labels itself as the "Horse Show Capital of the World") and its many exhibition halls, the area has one of the largest concentrations of hotel rooms in the southwest. This Hospitality District and the area surrounding it is anchored on the north by the developing Oklahoma River (just before reaching I-40). City leaders have already written a very large check for water taxis to operate steamboats to shuttle people from the area to downtown, and possibly connect to a yellow water taxi in Bricktown. The Oklahoma River is a vast ribbon of former blight razed and developed into parkland, and developers already have placed bids for major projects. There are numerous hotels, restaurants, and night clubs located in the Hospitality District.

East of the Hospitality District is the Dell Customer Contact Center, with an original projection of 500 jobs. It is now the highest performing service center that Dell operates, and the current job projection is around 4,500, mostly due to typical economic development as practiced by the Greater OKC Chamber of Commerce. The Dell campus will have a dock for the Oklahoma River Taxi.

North of the Dell Campus, at the intersections of Portland Ave., I-40 and I-44 is the Furniture District, with several specialty furniture stores.

The busiest section of the corridor is just north of Will Rogers World Airport and stretches from Airport Road (a controlled-access freeway) to I-40 is the Airport District. Located on the west side of the airport is the largest FAA center outside of Washington, D.C. (and the third largest employer in the metro area). In the area north of the airport are several corporations, including Hobby Lobby and affiliated Mardel's, headquartered within a mile of the District. Land is cheap as you venture further from Meridian Avenue, and many manufacturing facilities and corporate headquarters have their sprawling campuses on the southwest side of the metro. Other manufacturing companies include IEC International Environmental, ClimateMaster, as well as a distribution center for Associated Wholesale Grocers.

== Southside ==
=== I-240 Corridor ===
Stretching from I-35 on the east and I-44 to the west and between 59th and 89th Street, this area in recent years has become the Southside's mecca for shopping, dining and car buying. This densely packed area attracts mainly big box retailers away from Crossroads Mall at I-240 & I-35. The homes in the area are mostly small and older (mostly built between the 1950s and 1970s); the eateries and shops attract wealthier customers from suburbs surrounding southwest Oklahoma City (such as the Westmoore area).

The I-240 corridor has many national chain and other restaurants. Oklahoma City Community College, built in 1972 as South Oklahoma City Junior College, is located in the I-240 Corridor at I-44, and is the state's third largest college with over 22,000 students enrolled.

== Southeast ==
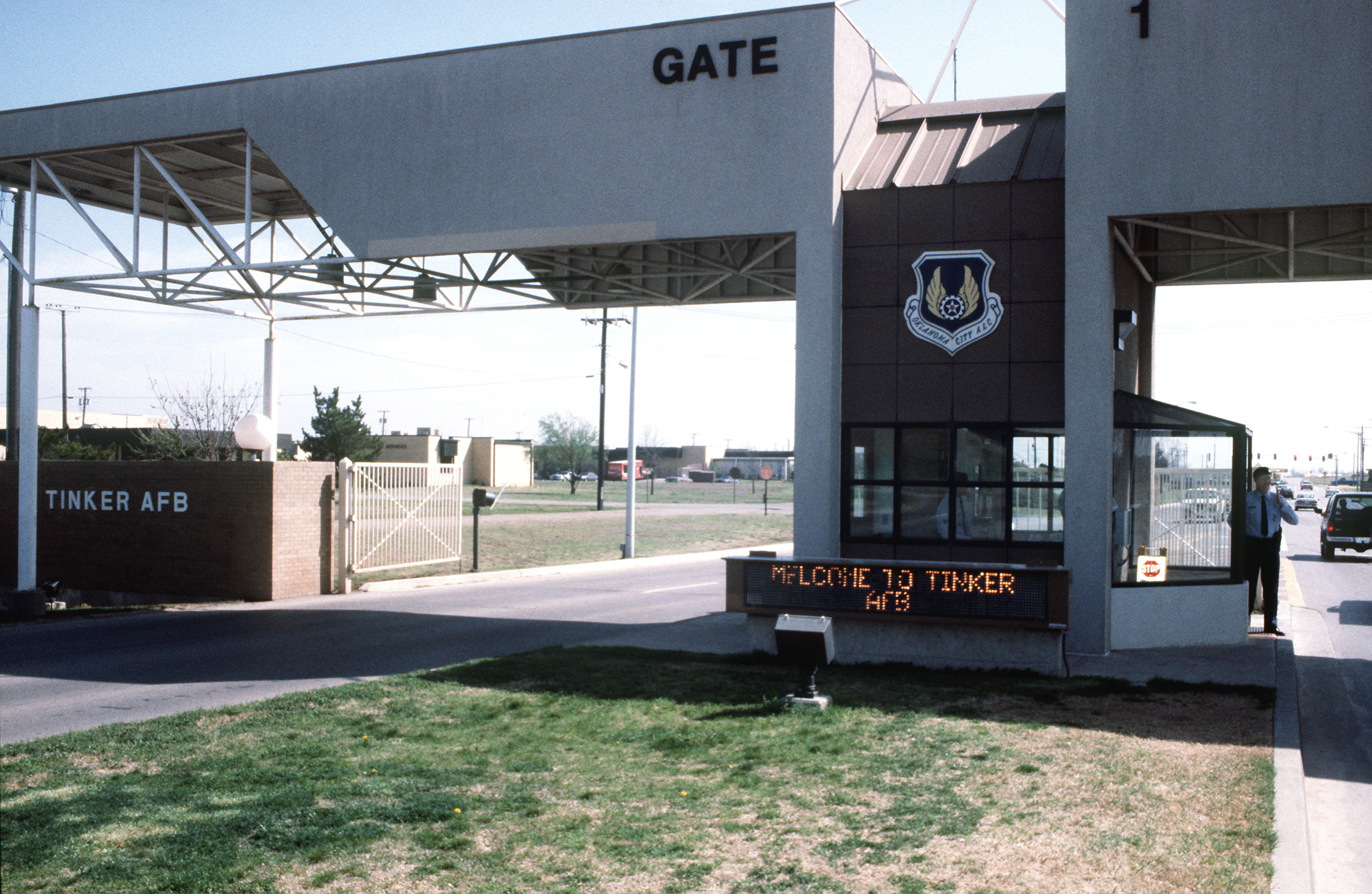
The main gate at Tinker Air Force Base, Oklahoma City.

The far southern sides of Del City almost touch I-240, where there are new housing additions, and numerous new manufacturing facilities along with a mountainous landfill. This area is very similar to the Memorial Road area. There are some new office buildings located in the area. Traffic often grinds to a halt on I-240 coming from Tinker Air Force Base, which lies between I-40 and I-240 in Oklahoma City, and touches Midwest City. Tinker is one of the nation's premier bases, employing over 30,000 people. The famously dismantled Oklahoma City Assembly plant, once operated by General Motors (now used by Tinker AFB), Quad Graphics, Amazon, and some other employers are scattered around the mostly industrial countryside. Several new industrial parks take advantage of the Tinker proximity, including the Boeing Defense facility.

Lake Stanley Draper is also in this area, and is the largest lake in the Oklahoma City limits. The lake is a 2,900 acre lake, and has very popular mountain biking trials nearby, which attract riders from around the state, with more than 14 miles (23 km) of single-track trails, varying in difficulty.
