= Uptown Oklahoma City =

Coordinates: 35°30′28″N 97°32′04″W

Uptown is an area of Oklahoma City. It is often bounded by the northernmost edge of downtown Oklahoma to south, and Northwest 23rd Street to the north. The area is known for its upper-scale classical houses, its bar and nightlife district, and being a major cultural hub of Oklahoma City.

== Geography ==
The neighborhood is bounded roughly by N.W. 23rd Street on the south, Interstate 235 on the east, Interstate 44 on the north and Pennsylvania on the west. However, "Uptown" has also been used to include Oklahoma City University, the Paseo Arts District, and practically anything in between downtown and Nichols Hills, though none of this has ever been officially recognized.

== History ==
=== Early history (1900s to 1960s) ===
The Uptown area began to expand after the creation of Oklahoma City, but saw major growth between the 1920s and 1930s. The Fairlawn Cemetery, Oklahoma City's oldest and largest cemetery, was started in 1892 and was considered one of the first major landmarks in what is now the Uptown District. The Overholser Mansion, built by "the father of Oklahoma City" Henry Overholser, was constructed in 1903 and was considered the first mansion in Oklahoma City, as among the first of many houses to be built in the Uptown area. Before long, other major figures of early Oklahoma City such as Charles Francis Colcord, G.A. Nichols, Jack C. Walton, Charles F. Urschel, and Robert L. Williams all developed the area and intended it be for "the elite" citizens. Nichols especially began purchasing hundreds of lots between 10th Street and 30th Street for the intent of real estate development.

In 1926, N.W. 23rd was designated as part of Route 66 and was seen as the "northern border of town". In 1936, the city began construction on the Tower Theatre, which originally caused negative feedback from citizens who said the location was "in the country". However, the Tower Theatre quickly became a major hub for arts in Oklahoma, and the remainder of N.W. 23rd Street began to blossom with business, recreation, and industry. As the population quickly grew past N.W. 23rd Street, the area began being called a "second downtown" and included several marketplaces, high-end restaurants, and shopping districts. By late 1940s, the area built the first, and for years the only, shopping district outside of downtown.

The Gold Dome was built on the corner of N.W. 23rd Street and Classen Boulevard in 1958. Originally a bank, The Gold Dome building was the fifth geodesic dome constructed in the world and the first to be used as a bank. It was described as “one of the nation’s most revolutionary bank designs.”

=== Later history (1960s to 2000s) ===
The area saw a massive decline entering the 1970s. Crime in the area was at one point the highest in Oklahoma, and neighborhoods in and around N.W. 23rd Street and Classen Blvd. were considered amongst the most dangerous neighborhoods in the southern United States, being seen as a major spot for the Crips.

Route 66 was dissolved and canceled in 1979, which further slowed down commerce in the area. In 1985, the iconic Tower Theatre closed down, as did many of the restaurants and marketplaces around it.

== Modern Uptown ==
Uptown has since seen a massive revisionist movement, primarily starting in the 2010s. The Tower Theatre was reopened and renovated in 2014, and has since become one of the most famous music venues and clubs in Oklahoma City.

=== Mesta Park & Heritage Hills ===
Considered one of the first residential areas on the north side of Oklahoma City, Mesta Park was founded in 1902 and began being heavily developed from 1906 to 1915, with further development expanding into the 1930s. Henry Overholser and his family constructed the Overholser Mansion in 1903, and is now a state historical landmark. Heritage Hills also began its conception around this time. The area is known for its classical Prairie, Foursquare, and Craftsman-style houses that makeup one of Oklahoma City's most upper-class neighborhoods.

=== The Gold Dome ===
The Gold Dome was built in 1958 and has since become one of the most distinguished and recognizable landmarks in Oklahoma City.

=== The Plaza District ===
The Plaza District lies along N.W. 16th Street and has become one of the major hubs for nightlife in Oklahoma City. The area, which began a modern revision in 2011, features dozens of bars, nightlife restaurants, and art exhibits.

=== N.W. 23rd Street ===
The modern N.W. 23rd Street is still considered to be a hub for nightlife. The Tower Theatre is one of the city's biggest music venues.
