= Overseas Hoa communities =

Overseas Hoa communities comprise ethnic Chinese originating from Vietnam who have established transnational networks linking Vietnam, China, and countries of settlement. Overseas Hoa occupy a "hybrid diaspora" position, simultaneously participating in Chinese, Vietnamese, and local ethnic communities rather than fitting neatly into a single national diaspora.

Research on return migration since the 1990s has shown that overseas Hoa who resettle, invest, or retire in Vietnam are often incorporated into the broader category of overseas Vietnamese (Việt kiều), despite having previously been identified as ethnic Chinese. Resulting in an identity complex emphasizing Chinese ancestry, Vietnamese cultural experience, and a combined Chinese-Vietnamese heritage. Family, business, and cultural networks commonly persist across multiple countries, reflecting the community's historical roots in regional migration systems across East and Southeast Asia.

== Hoa concentrations in Vietnam ==
- Ho Chi Minh City: Cho Lon
- Tiền Giang
- Đồng Nai
- Kiên Giang
- Trà Vinh Province
- Hai Phong (most emigrated or forced out during the 1979 crisis).
- Bạc Liêu
- Cà Mau

== Returned Overseas communities ==
=== Mainland China ===
The Chinese Vietnamese population in China now number up to 300,000, and live mostly in 194 refugee settlements mostly in the provinces of Guangdong, Guangxi, Hainan, Fujian, Yunnan and Jiangxi. More than 85% have achieved economic independence, but the remainder live below the poverty line in rural areas.

=== Hong Kong ===
In Hong Kong, the Hoa immigrants mostly live in Yuen Long.

=== Taiwan ===
- Penghu（澎湖越南華僑難民營）

== Hoa descent in other countries ==
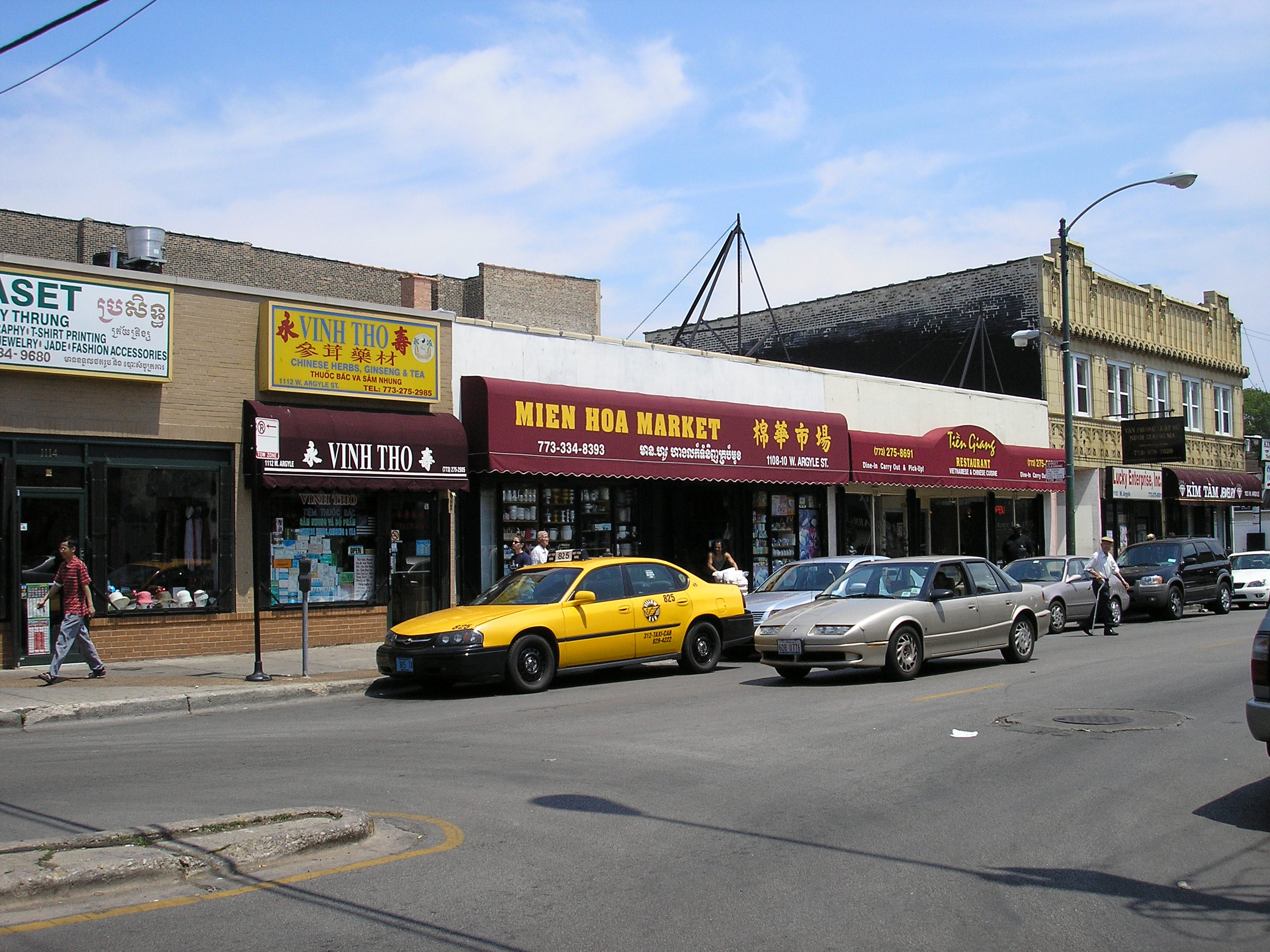
A mixed Hoa and Cambodian Chinese business district in Chicago

=== United States ===
- Boston: Chinatown; and larger presence in Dorchester section
- Chicago: New Chinatown
- Dallas
- Denver
- Detroit: Madison Heights
- Honolulu: Chinatown
- Houston: Chinatown
- Los Angeles metropolitan area: San Gabriel Valley, Orange County, Chinatown
- New York City: Chinatown
- Oklahoma City: Asia District
- Orange County: Little Saigon
- Philadelphia: Chinatown
- Sacramento: Little Saigon
- San Francisco Bay Area: San Francisco, San Jose, Fremont, Oakland
- Seattle: International District

=== Canada ===
- Calgary
- Edmonton
- Montreal: Chinatown, Brossard
- Ottawa
- Toronto: Chinatown, Toronto, Mississauga, North York, Kitchener, Ontario, Waterloo, Ontario
- Windsor, Ontario
- Winnipeg: Chinatown, Winnipeg
- Vancouver: Chinatown, East Vancouver, Richmond
- Victoria, British Columbia

=== Australia ===
- Melbourne: Box Hill, Footscray, Springvale
- Sydney: Cabramatta, Bankstown

=== France ===
- Paris: 13th arrondissement
- Marseille

=== United Kingdom ===
- London: Hackney, Lewisham
