= Asia District =

Asia District could refer to:

- Asia District, Oklahoma City for the Chinatown district in Oklahoma City
- Asia District, Peru for the district in Cañete Province, Peru
