= OSFA =

OSFA may refer to:

- Ozark Science Fiction Association (St. Louis, Missouri)
- Office of Student Financial Aid (or Financial Assistance), at institutions of higher education
- Oklahoma State Firefighters Association
- Old Scholars Football Association
- One size fits all
  - One Size Fits All (Frank Zappa album), a 1975 album by Frank Zappa
- Orthopedic Surgery of the Foot and Ankle
