= Commuter rail in North America =

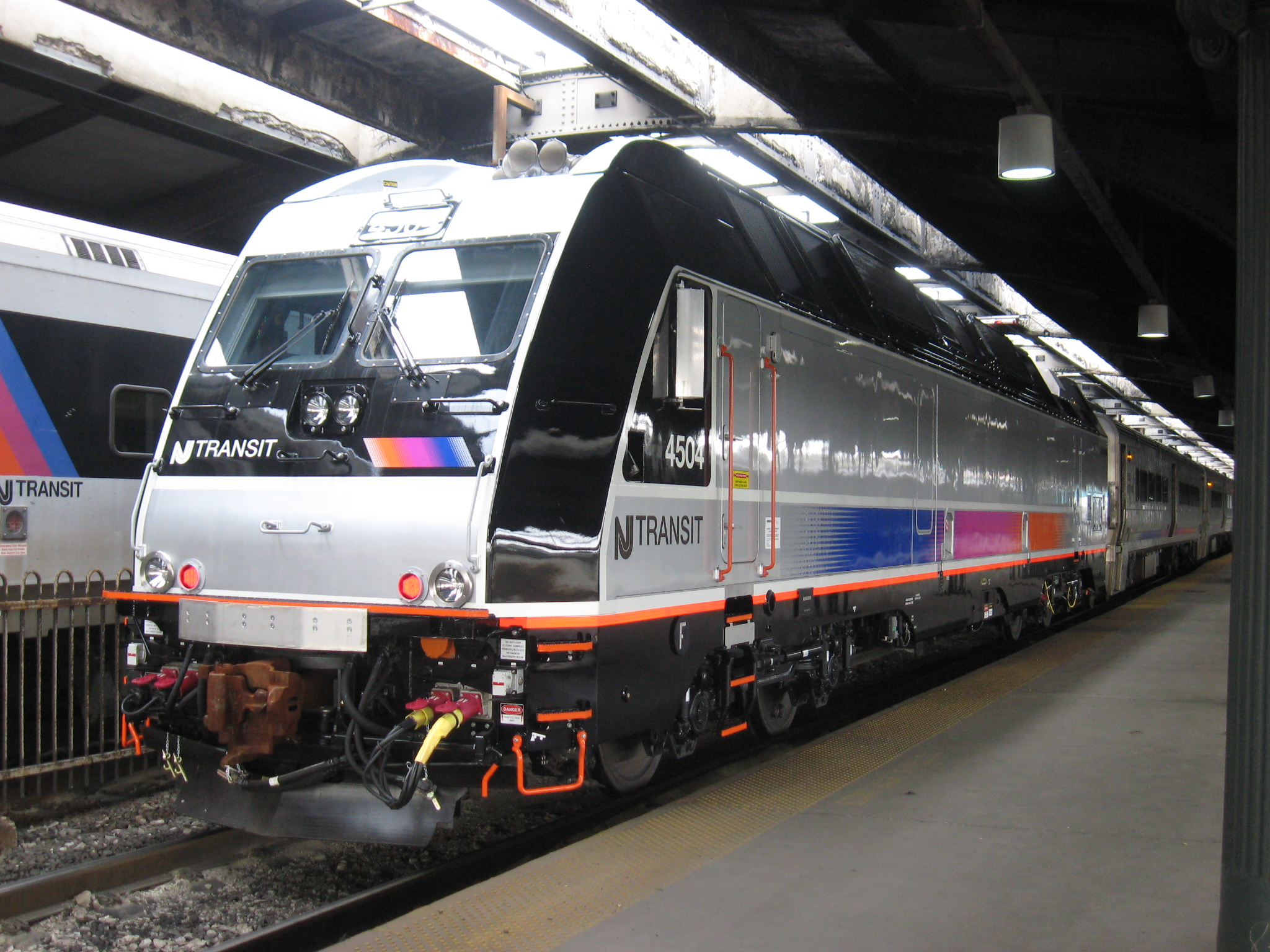
NJ Transit has an extensive commuter rail system connecting New Jersey to New York City and Philadelphia.

GO Transit operates a vast commuter rail system connecting Toronto to the Greater Golden Horseshoe region.

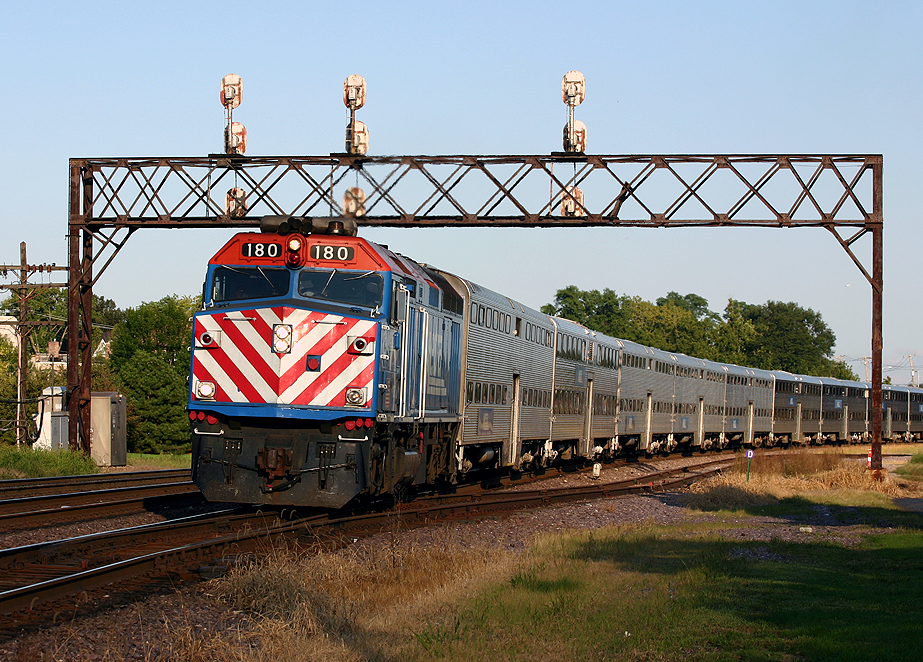
A Metra train in West Chicago, Illinois.

Commuter rail services in Canada, Costa Rica, Cuba, Mexico, Panama and the United States provide common carrier passenger transportation along railway tracks, with scheduled service on fixed routes on a non-reservation basis, primarily for short-distance (local) travel between a central business district and adjacent suburbs and regional travel between cities of a conurbation. It does not include rapid transit or light rail service.

== Services ==
Many, but not all, newer commuter railways offer service during peak times only, with trains into the central business district during morning rush hour and returning to the outer areas during the evening rush hour. This mode of operation is, in many cases, simplified by ending the train with a special passenger carriage (referred to as a cab car), which has an operating cab and can control the locomotive remotely, to avoid having to turn the train around at each end of its route. Other systems avoid the problem entirely by using bi-directional multiple units.

Other commuter rail services, many of them older, long-established ones, operate seven days a week, with service from early morning to after midnight. On these systems, patrons use the trains not just to get to and from work or school, but also for attending sporting events, concerts, theatre, and the like. Some also provide service to popular weekend getaway spots and recreation areas. The Long Island Rail Road (LIRR) is the only commuter railroad that operates 24 hours a day, 7 days a week in North America.

Almost all commuter rail services in North America are operated by government entities or quasi-governmental organizations. Most share tracks or rights-of-way used by longer-distance passenger services (e.g. Amtrak, Via Rail), freight trains, or other commuter services. The 600-mile-long (970 km) electrified Northeast Corridor in the United States is shared by commuter trains and Amtrak's Acela Express, regional, and intercity trains.

Commuter rail operators often sell reduced-price multiple-trip tickets (such as a monthly or weekly pass), charge specific station-to-station fares, and have one or two railroad stations in the central business district. Commuter trains typically connect to metro or bus services at their destination and along their route.

After the completion of SEPTA Regional Rail's Center City Commuter Connection in 1981, which allowed through-running between two formerly separate radial networks, the term "regional rail" began to be used to refer to commuter rail (and sometimes even larger heavy rail and light rail) systems that offer bidirectional all-day service and may provide useful connections between suburbs and edge cities, rather than merely transporting workers to a central business district. This is different from the European use of "regional rail", which generally refers to services midway between commuter rail and intercity rail that are not primarily commuter-oriented.

Some transit lines in the NYC metropolitan areas have commuter lines that act like a regional rail network, as lines often converge at one point and pass as a main line to the destination station. They also pass through large business areas (ie Harlem, Jamaica, Stamford, Metropark), and some lines operate every 5–10 minutes during peak hours, and roughly every 15 minutes during off hours.

== Spread ==
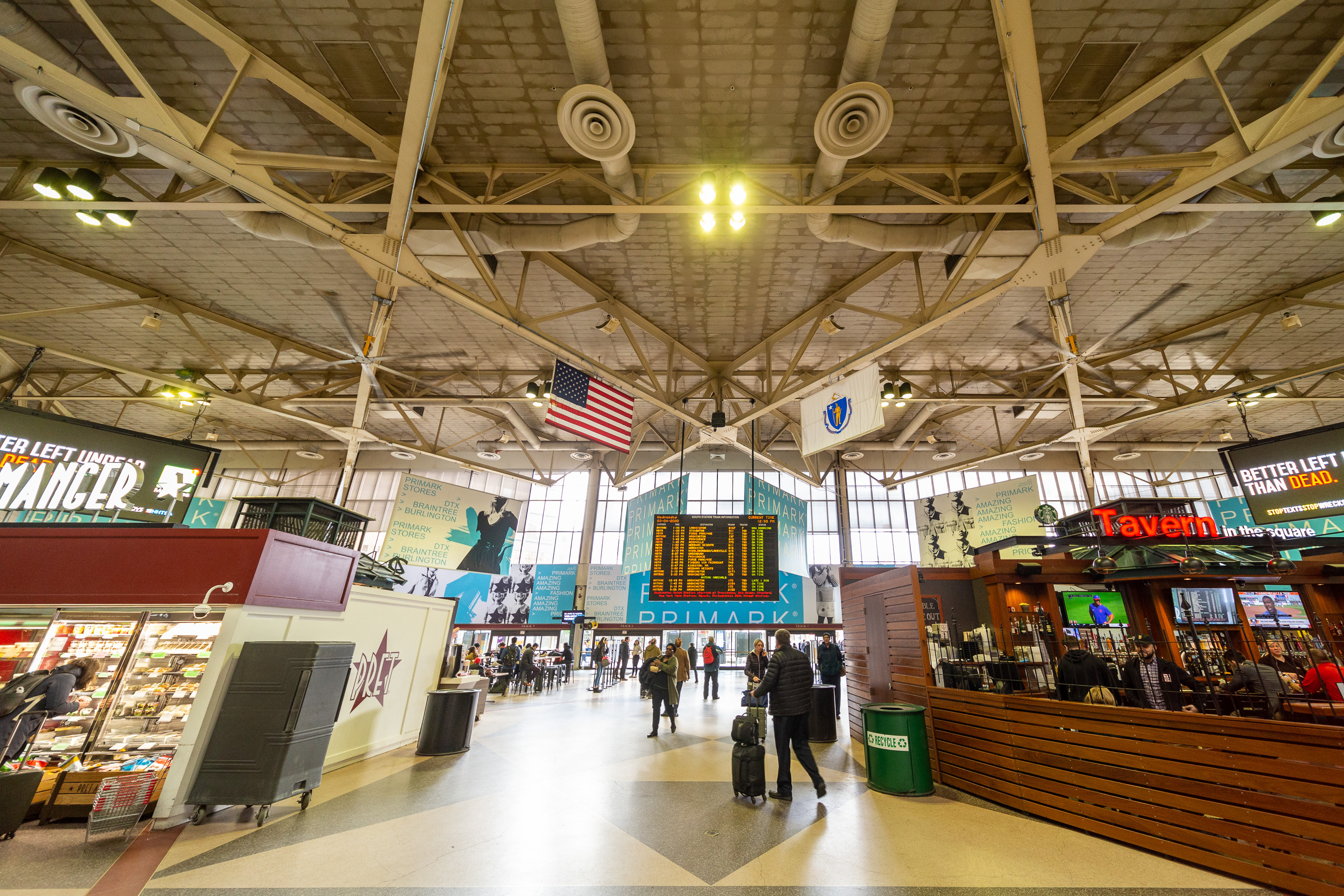
South Station in Boston, Massachusetts is a major transportation hub for the MBTA's commuter rail services.

The two busiest passenger rail stations in the United States are Pennsylvania Station and Grand Central Terminal, which are both located in the Borough of Manhattan in New York City, and which serve three of the four busiest commuter railroads in the United States (the Long Island Rail Road and NJ Transit at Penn Station, and the Metro-North Railroad and the Long Island Rail Road at Grand Central Terminal). The commuter railroads serving the Chicago area are Metra (the fourth-busiest commuter railroad in the United States) and the South Shore Line (one of the last surviving interurbans). Other notable commuter railroad systems include SEPTA Regional Rail (fifth-busiest in the US), serving the Philadelphia area; MBTA Commuter Rail (sixth-busiest in the US), serving the Greater Boston-Providence area; Caltrain, serving the area south of San Francisco along the peninsula as far as San Jose; and Metrolink, serving the 5-county Los Angeles area.

There are only three commuter rail agencies in Canada: GO Transit in Toronto, Exo in Montreal (eighth-busiest in North America), and West Coast Express in Vancouver. GO Transit's rail network is the third busiest commuter rail system in North America. The two busiest rail stations in Canada are Union Station in Toronto and Gare Centrale in Montreal.

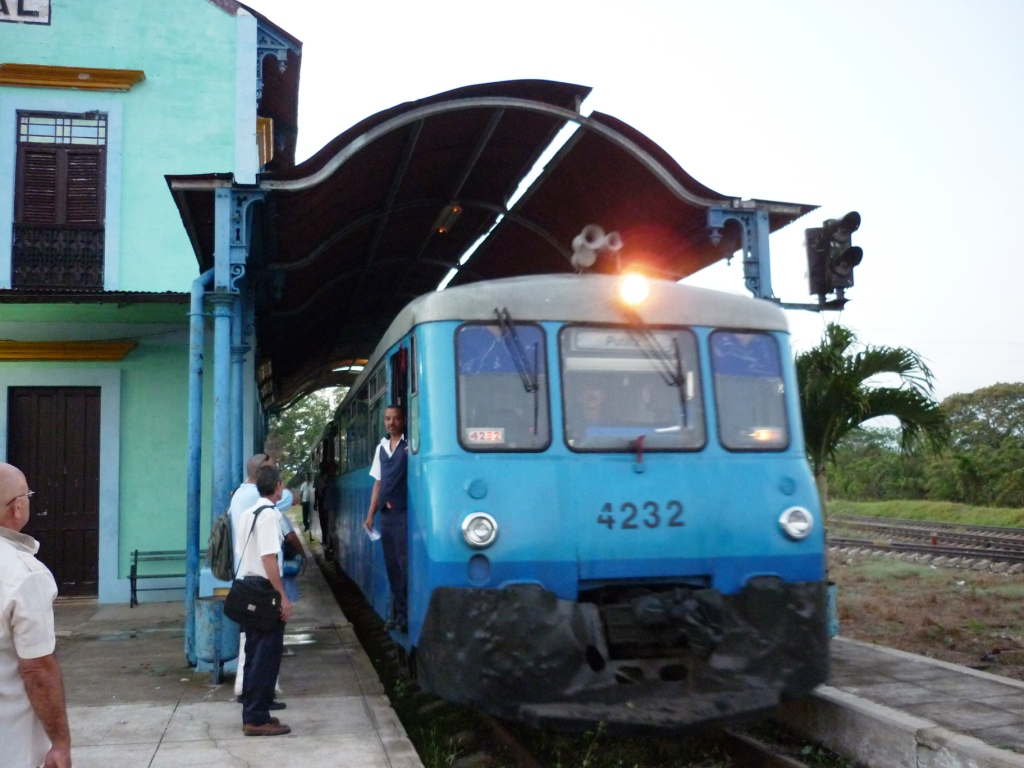
A suburban train in Bejucal, Cuba

Commuter rail networks outside of densely populated urban areas like the Washington D.C., New York, Chicago, Philadelphia, Boston, San Francisco, Montreal, and Toronto metropolitan areas have historically been sparse. Since the 1990s, however, several commuter rail projects have been proposed and built throughout the United States, especially in the Sun Belt and other regions characterized by urban sprawl that have traditionally been underserved by public transportation. Since then, commuter rail networks have been inaugurated in Dallas–Fort Worth, Los Angeles, San Diego, Minneapolis, Denver, Salt Lake City, and Orlando, among other cities. Several more commuter rail projects have been proposed and are in the planning stages.

== Rolling stock ==
Commuter trains are either powered by diesel-electric or electric locomotives, or else use self-propelled cars (some systems, such as the New York area's Metro-North Railroad, use both). A few systems, particularly around New York City, use electric power, supplied by a third rail and/or overhead catenary wire, which provides quicker acceleration, lower noise, and fewer air-quality issues. Philadelphia's SEPTA Regional Rail uses exclusively electric power, supplied by overhead catenary wire.

Diesel-electric locomotives based on the EMD F40PH design as well as the MP36PH-3C are popular as motive power for commuter trains. Manufacturers of coaches include Bombardier, Kawasaki, Nippon Sharyo, and Hyundai Rotem. A few systems use diesel multiple unit vehicles, including WES Commuter Rail near Portland and Austin's Capital MetroRail. These systems use vehicles supplied by Stadler Rail or US Railcar (formerly Colorado Railcar).

== List of North American commuter rail operators ==
UC=Under construction.

Metropolitan area(s)	Country	System	Province / State	Number of lines	Avg. weekday ridership (Q4 2018)	Avg. weekday ridership (Q4 2024)	Electrified
San Jose–Tri-Valley–Stockton	USA	Altamont Corridor Express (ACE)	California	1 (2 UC)	6,100	3,100	No
San Francisco–Gilroy	USA	Caltrain	California	1	57,000	25,800	Overhead line, 25 kV 60 Hz AC (partially, north of San Jose)
Sacramento–San Francisco Bay Area	USA	Capitol Corridor (Note: State sponsored Amtrak route with commuter rail focus)	California	1	5,700		No
San Diego–Oceanside	USA	Coaster	California	1	4,500	2,400	No
San Bernardino	USA	Arrow	California	1		416	No
Dallas	USA	DART Silver Line	Texas	1			No
Brunswick–Portland–Boston	USA	Downeaster	Maine / New Hampshire / Massachusetts	1	1,300		No
Montreal	CAN	Exo	Quebec	5	83,300	77,210	No
Ogden–Salt Lake City–Provo	USA	FrontRunner	Utah	1	19,200	15,000	No
Toronto–Greater Golden Horseshoe	CAN	GO Transit	Ontario	7	271,000	218,100	Planned, On Hold
New Haven / Hartford / Springfield / New London	USA	CT Rail	Connecticut / Massachusetts	2			No (Hartford Line); Overhead line, 12 kV 25 Hz AC and 25 kV 60 Hz AC (Shore Line East)
Havana	CUB	Havana Suburban Railway	La Habana / Artemisa / Mayabeque / Matanzas	8			No (Lines 1 to 7); Overhead line, 600 V DC (Hershey Railway)
Greater Metropolitan Area	CRI	Interurbano Line	San José / Alajuela / Cartago / Heredia	3			No
Mexico City–Toluca	MEX	El Insurgente	Mexico City / Mexico	1		10,000	Overhead line, 25 kV 60 Hz AC
Harrisburg–Philadelphia–New York City	USA	Keystone Service	Pennsylvania / New York	1	5,000		Overhead line, 12 kV 25 Hz AC
New York City–Long Island	USA	Long Island Rail Road	New York	11	360,000	276,800	Third rail, 750 V DC (only parts of the network)
Baltimore–Washington, D.C.	USA	MARC Train	Maryland / West Virginia / District of Columbia	3	23,500	14,000	No (Brunswick Line, Camden Line); Overhead line, 12 kV 25 Hz AC (Penn Line)
Boston / Worcester / Providence	USA	MBTA Commuter Rail	Massachusetts / Rhode Island	12 (1 UC)	121,600	109,300	No
Chicago metropolitan area	USA	Metra	Illinois / Wisconsin	11	277,100	168,600	Overhead line, 1,500 V DC (Metra Electric District); No (Other lines)
Los Angeles–Southern California	USA	Metrolink	California	8	37,600	19,200	No
New York City / New Haven / Poughkeepsie	USA	Metro-North Railroad	New York / Connecticut	8 (1 UC)	315,700	254,900	Overhead line, 12 kV 25 Hz AC (New Haven Line); Third rail, 750 V DC (only parts of the network)
Northern New Jersey–New York City; Philadelphia–Atlantic City	USA	NJ Transit Rail Operations	New Jersey / New York / Pennsylvania	12 (1 UC)	238,082 (FY2017) (Note: This figure is from NJ Transit's Fiscal Year 2017, which covers the calendar period July 2016 to June 2017.)	172,000	Overhead line, 25 kV 60 Hz AC; Overhead line, 12 kV 25 Hz AC (only parts of the network)
Albuquerque–Santa Fe	USA	New Mexico Rail Runner Express	New Mexico	1	2,500	2,800	No
Panama City–Colón	PAN	Panama Canal Railway	Panamá / Colón	1	1,500 (2013)		No
Denver	USA	RTD Rail	Colorado	4	28,700	32,000	Overhead line, 25 kV 60 Hz AC
Santa Rosa–San Rafael	USA	Sonoma–Marin Area Rail Transit	California	1		3,400	No
Chicago–South Bend	USA	South Shore Line	Illinois / Indiana	2	10,900	6,300	Overhead line, 1,500 V DC
Philadelphia	USA	SEPTA Regional Rail	Pennsylvania / New Jersey / Delaware	13	126,000	77,700	Overhead line, 12 kV 25 Hz AC
Everett–Seattle–Tacoma	USA	Sounder	Washington	2	18,300	6,900	No
Greater Orlando	USA	SunRail	Florida	1	5,600	5,100	No
Ixtepec and surroundings	MEX	El Tehuanito	Oaxaca	1 (1 UC)			No
Mexico City	MEX	Tren Suburbano	Mexico City / Mexico	1	195,000 (2017)		Overhead line, 25 kV 60 Hz AC
Mexico City	MEX	Felipe Ángeles	Mexico City / Mexico	1			Overhead line, 25 kV 60 Hz AC
Dallas–Fort Worth	USA	Trinity Railway Express	Texas	1	6,800	4,100	No
Greater Miami	USA	Tri-Rail	Florida	2	13,900	15,400	No
Washington, D.C.	USA	Virginia Railway Express	Virginia / District of Columbia	2	16,800	6,200	No
Nashville	USA	WeGo Star	Tennessee	1	1,100	300	No
Vancouver	CAN	West Coast Express	British Columbia	1	9,900	6,100	No
Portland	USA	WES Commuter Rail	Oregon	1	1,600	300	No

== List of under construction and planned systems ==
There are several commuter rail systems currently under construction or in development in Canada, Mexico and the United States.

Metropolitan Area	Country	Province/State	System	Official site	Other sites
Aguascalientes	MEX	Aguascalientes	Tren Suburbano (no official name yet)		
Guadalajara	MEX	Jalisco	Tren Suburbano		
Monterrey	MEX	Nuevo León	Tren Suburbano de Monterrey		
Alameda County / San Joaquin County	USA	California	Valley Link		
Anchorage	USA	Alaska	Alaska Railroad (existing long-distance railroad, proposed commuter service)		
Charlotte	USA	North Carolina	Lynx Red Line		
Detroit	USA	Michigan	SEMCOG Commuter Rail		
Durham	USA	North Carolina	GoTriangle commuter rail (no official name)		
Jacksonville	USA	Florida	First Coast Commuter Rail		
Miami-Dade	USA	Florida	Northeast Corridor Rapid Transit Project		
Milwaukee	USA	Wisconsin	Kenosha-Racine-Milwaukee Commuter Rail		
Minneapolis	USA	Minnesota	Dan Patch Corridor		
Oklahoma City	USA	Oklahoma	Oklahoma City commuter rail		
Phoenix	USA	Arizona	Arizona Passenger Rail Corridor Study		
San Diego	USA	California	SANDAG Purple Line		
San Luis Obispo	USA	California	Coast Rail Corridor Study		
Santa Cruz	USA	California	Santa Cruz Branch		

== Former ==
The following systems have ceased operations since the formation of Amtrak in 1971.

- Cannonball between Milwaukee and Watertown, Wisconsin (until 1972)
- Cleveland commuter rail, former Erie Lackawanna, later Conrail, service between Cleveland and Youngstown, Ohio (until 1977)
- Providence - Westerly service, New Haven, Penn Central and lastly Conrail service (until 1977)
- Los Angeles, California
  - El Camino, Los Angeles to San Diego (1978)
  - CalTrain, Oxnard to Los Angeles (1982–1983)
- Detroit, Michigan
  - SEMTA (1974–1983)
  - Penn Central, Michigan Executive between Detroit and Ann Arbor (until 1975 when service was commuted to Amtrak, operated until 1984)
- Pittsburgh, Pennsylvania
  - Parkway Limited, Pittsburgh, PA (1981)
  - Pittsburgh and Lake Erie Railroad service from Pittsburgh to Beaver Falls, Pennsylvania (until 1985)
  - PATrain, Pittsburgh, PA (1979–1989)
- Toronto to Havelock service on the Canadian Pacific Havelock Subdivision (until 1991) and further on to Peterborough (until 1990)
- Calumet, Penn Central, later Conrail service between Chicago and Valparaiso, Indiana (until 1979 when service was conveyed to Amtrak, operated until 1991)
- Champlain Flyer, Burlington, Vermont (2000–2003)
- City rail, La Ceiba, Honduras (until 2006)
- OnTrack, Syracuse, New York (1994–2007)
- FENADESAL service from San Salvador to Soyapango and Apopa, El Salvador (?–2000, 2004–2005, 2007–2013)
- Northstar Line, Minneapolis to Big Lake, Minnesota (2009–2026)

== See also ==
- Interurban
- List of airport circulators
- List of metro systems
- List of suburban and commuter rail systems
- List of rail transit systems in the United States
- List of tram and light rail transit systems
- List of United States commuter rail systems by ridership
- Northeast Corridor
- Public transport
- Regional rail
- Transit (transportation)
- Transportation in New York City
