= Transportation in Oklahoma City =

Oklahoma City is near the geographic center of the United States and is an integral point on the U.S. Interstate Network. The city is served by numerous roads and highways, toll roads, three major airports, a train station, a bus station, and a transit system.

== Roads and highways ==
Oklahoma City is served by an extensive freeway network. The city's network serves every major city in the region and are six to eight lanes. Most have a level of congestion significantly lower than most comparably sized cities. In fact, OKC's freeways are rarely congested with the "stop and go" commuter patterns of other major cities. It is often said that one can get from any part of the OKC Metro area to downtown in 30 minutes or less by freeway. The city streets are on a N–S–E–W grid network with major streets one mile separated.

The former section of I-40 directly adjacent to downtown was known as the "Crosstown Expressway". The I-40 Crosstown Construction Project relocated the original elevated stretch of highway several blocks to the south. It opened to the public in 2012.

=== Interstate highways ===
Three major interstate routes serve the city in addition to two auxiliary interstates. Oklahoma City is the only city in the nation dissected by two interstate highways that reach the entire length of the nation (Interstate 40 E-W and Interstate 35 N-S).

- Interstate 35 – Major cities connected:
  - Wichita, Kansas City and Minneapolis–Saint Paul to the north
  - Dallas-Fort Worth, Austin and San Antonio to the south
- Interstate 40 – Major cities connected:
  - Amarillo, Albuquerque and its terminus in Barstow, California to the west
  - Little Rock, Memphis and Nashville to the east
- Interstate 44 – Major cities connected:
  - Tulsa and its terminus in St. Louis to the east
  - Lawton and its terminus in Wichita Falls, Texas to the west
- Interstate 235 – Downtown Oklahoma City; I-35/I-40 junction to the I-44/Broadway Extension junction in North Oklahoma City
- Interstate 240 – SW Oklahoma City; I-344 to I-40 in Eastern Oklahoma County

=== Other major thoroughfares ===
- Broadway Extension (US-77) – North Oklahoma City
- Lake Hefner Parkway (SH-74) – Northwest Oklahoma City
- Kilpatrick Turnpike (Outer Loop Tollway/I-344) – North and West Oklahoma City
- Northwest Expressway (SH-3) – Northwest Oklahoma City
- 39th Expressway (SH-66) – West Oklahoma City
- Northeast 23rd Street (US-62) – East Oklahoma County
- Shields Boulevard (US-77) – South Oklahoma City
- Reno Avenue – West/East Central Oklahoma City

== Air ==
Oklahoma City is a major air transportation and maintenance center, with three major airports and numerous other smaller ones. OKC Will Rogers International Airport (OKC) is the principal commercial airport of the state and is the anchor of the city's network; located on the SW side of the city, the airport is completing the second phase of an expansion plan and is currently expanding its non-stop flight offerings (with emphasis on its top-15 O/D destinations). Will Rogers also serves as a major maintenance facility with numerous companies providing maintenance to large passenger aircraft. In addition, JPATS has its hub facility at the airport and numerous cargo carriers and air shuttles operate at the airport.

Wiley Post Airport (PWA) is located in the West Oklahoma City suburb of Bethany and is the FAA-designated reliever airport for Will Rogers World Airport. It also is the primary general and corporate aviation airport for the Oklahoma City metropolitan area.

Tinker Air Force Base is the largest military air depot in the nation and is located in SE Oklahoma County.

Clarence E. Page Municipal Airport is a city-owned public use airport located in Canadian County.

Sundance Airpark is a privately owned public use airport located in Canadian County.

== Rail ==
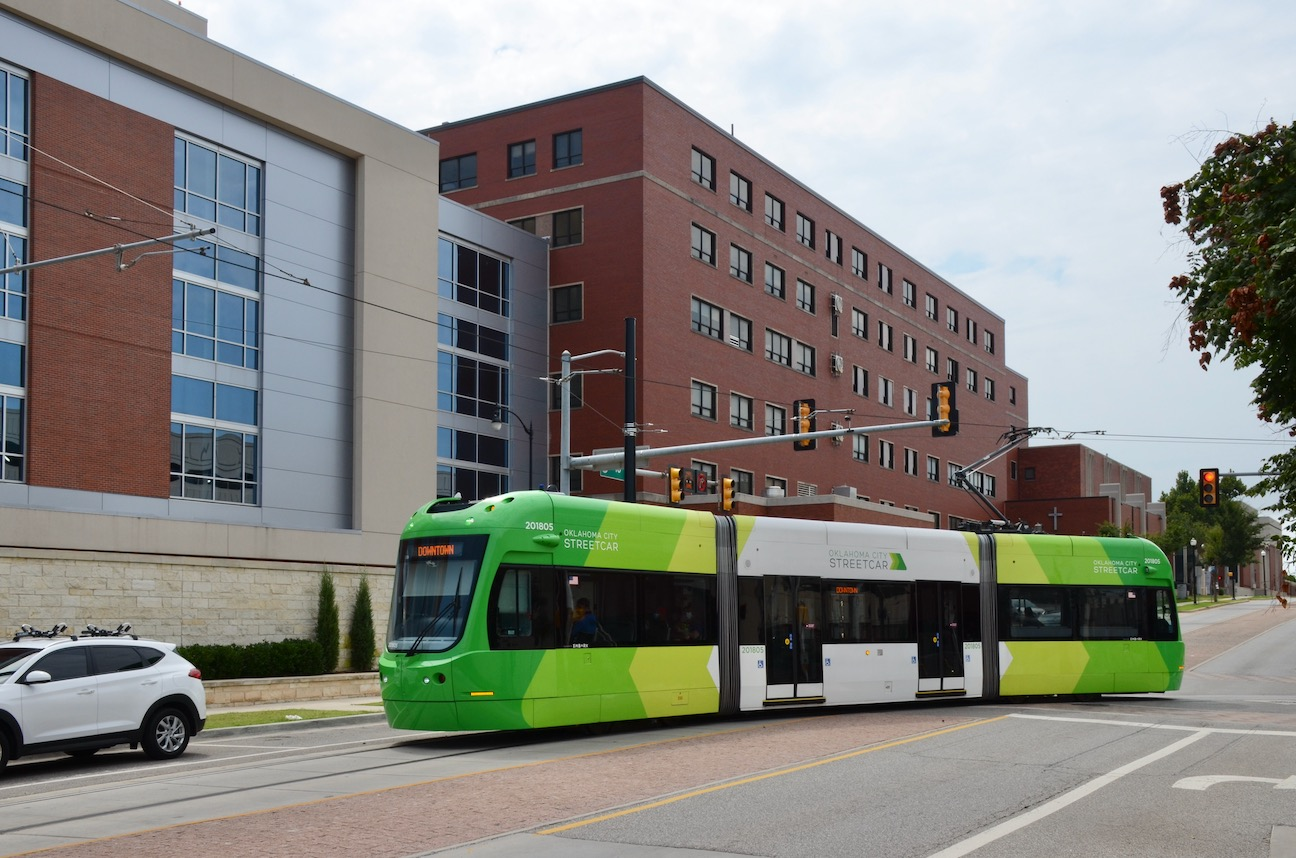
A streetcar on the 2018-opened OKC Streetcar system passing St. Anthony Hospital, in Midtown

Oklahoma City is experiencing a new renaissance in rail service. What began with only freight service in the early 1990s was transformed by the arrival of the Heartland Flyer. With its daily service to Fort Worth, the Heartland Flyer provides access to the nation's rail network and has given Oklahoma City yet another option for inter-state transportation.

There were plans in the early 1990s to build a light rail system for the city as part of the MAPS urban redevelopment program, but the project stalled repeatedly on issues of funding. Ernest Istook, 5th District Congressman and chairman of the congressional transportation committee, played a major role in killing federal funding for the project. However he played vital roles in getting other major cities funded for light rail like Los Angeles.

A downtown streetcar (or trolley) system, the Oklahoma City Streetcar, opened in December 2018. Its construction was funded in part by the MAPS 3 initiative that was approved by the region's voters in 2009. In January 2006, Embark, then known as Metro Transit, had released a new Mass Transit plan that detailed its vision of rapid transit in the coming years. The study results showed a modern trolley in Downtown OKC, commuter rail from downtown to the suburbs of Edmond and Norman and a comprehensive, specialized metropolitan bus network. In April 2021, the Oklahoma legislature announced that further studies for commuter rail through the RTA's Transit System Plan were moving forward. The corridors would include:

- The North-South Corridor connecting Edmond, Oklahoma City, Moore and Norman.
- The East Corridor from Tinker Air Force Base through Midwest City and Del City to downtown.
- The West Corridor from the Yukon area to downtown and serving fast-growing suburban neighborhoods in Western Oklahoma County and Canadian County.
- The Airport Corridor from Will Rogers International Airport to downtown.

=== Passenger service ===
Amtrak serves Oklahoma City via the Heartland Flyer, based out of the Art Deco Santa Fe train station in downtown. It has daily service to the satellite city of Norman and terminates at Fort Worth, Texas where passengers can transfer to the nation's rail network. There is currently a major push to expand the Heartland Flyer north into Kansas since the service has been guaranteed by recent state contributions.

There is also a heritage rail line under re-construction that will connect Adventure District in NE Oklahoma City to downtown. The line likely would run from the Santa Fe train station through Bricktown and the Oklahoma Health Center through the Eastside to Adventure District attractions such as the Oklahoma City Zoological Park, Remington Park, and the National Cowboy and Western Heritage Museum.

- Santa Fe Station
- Union Station

=== Freight lines ===
Union Pacific and Burlington Northern Santa Fe are the major freight lines in the city.

== Bus ==
Union Bus Station is the principal bus terminal in the state. It is located just east of downtown. Greyhound and several other regional and intercity bus companies serve Oklahoma City given its central location.

== Public transit ==
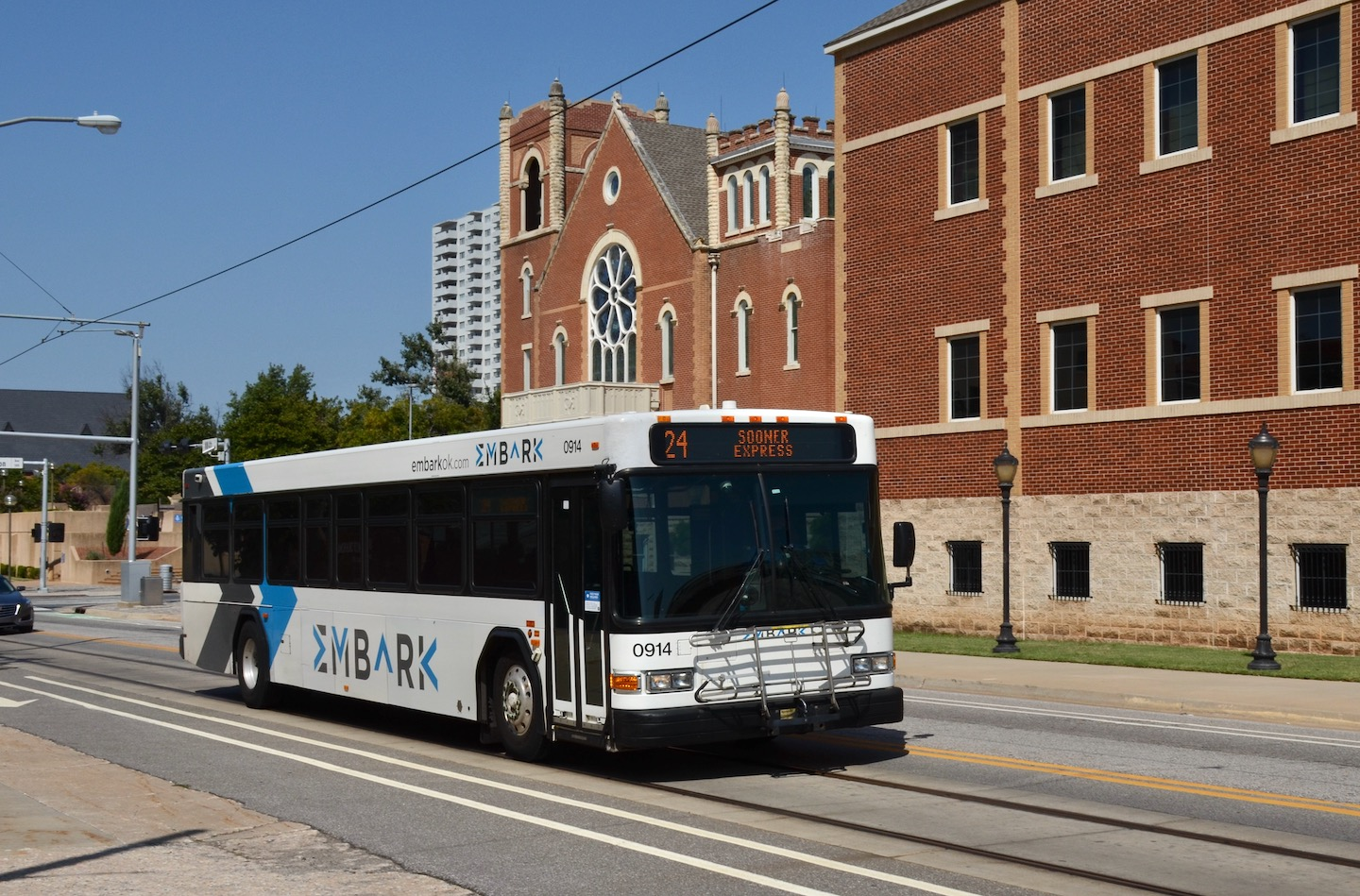
Embark bus in downtown Oklahoma City, 2021

Embark is the public transit provider with its new bus terminal downtown at NW 5th Street and Hudson Avenue. Embark has numerous routes, most of them being in the central inner city areas and commuter routes from the suburbs of Edmond and Norman to downtown. Metro's service is lacking in some respects, but there are plans to improve it through Metro's vision known as Fixed Guideway Study.

Also part of the FGS, a new streetcar system known as the Oklahoma City Streetcar, which opened in December 2018, was completed under the city's MAPS 3 initiative. Served by modern, low-floor streetcars, the line connects the CBD with the other major downtown districts in the short term, with expansions proposed to Asia District and the NW Business District as well as the Oklahoma Health Center and Research Park and the Capital Hill district. The study results also showed commuter rail from downtown to the suburbs of Del City, Edmond, Midwest City, Moore and Norman and a comprehensive rapid or commuter bus network for the remainder of the metropolitan area.

Electric scooter company Lime located scooter rentals near city bus stops.

== See also ==
- Plug-in electric vehicles in Oklahoma § Oklahoma City
