= Oklahoma Film Exchange =

Independent movie theater in Oklahoma City, Oklahoma

- Interactive map of Oklahoma Film Exchange
- Address: 701 W Sheridan Ave, Oklahoma City, OK 73102
- Location: Oklahoma City, Oklahoma
- Coordinates: 35.466769997412335°N 97.5244497483432°W
- Type: microcinema

Construction
- Built: 1919
- Opened: 2025

Website
- www.oklahomafilmexchange.com

Oklahoma Film Exchange (OFX) is a worker owned venue and microcinema located in the Film Row neighborhood of Oklahoma City, Oklahoma, on the corner of W Sheridan Avenue and N Lee Avenue. The cinema operates out of the Paramount Building, a former affiliate of Paramount Pictures, and utilizes the last remaining film exchange screening room in the United States.

== History ==
The screening room was built as a film exchange in 1919 by the Oklahoma Specialty Film Company to service local theater operators. The building was soon acquired by the Paramount Film Distributing Corporation who renamed it the Paramount Building.

In the early 2000s, the screening room opened as a one-room movie theater called the Paramount Reel Art Cinema. Due to the COVID-19 pandemic, the cinema closed in March of 2020.

On June 18, 2021, the cinema reopened as a secondary location of nearby Rodeo Cinemas and was dubbed Rodeo Cinema on Film Row. Rodeo Cinemas closed the location in the summer of 2025.

Faced with imminent closure and decommission, an Indiegogo campaign titled SAVE FILM ROW: America's Last Screening Room was launched by OFX in August of 2025. The campaign sought $100,000 to fund the acquisition and preservation of the screening room. Despite only raising $15,000, accumulated cash donations allowed OFX to purchase the lease and establish the Film Exchange.

The cinema opened as Oklahoma Film Exchange on September 11, 2025.

== Operation ==
OFX offers a wide array of daily event repertory screenings including arthouse films, genre movies, B-movies, animation, and experimental cinema. Their programming upholds stated values of promoting media literacy, queer advocacy, Indigenous advocacy, and support of local art.

The cinema is single-screen and seats 50 people. Film and live event admission is pay what you can.
