= Pioneer Center for the Performing Arts =

- Pioneer Theater Auditorium
- U.S. National Register of Historic Places
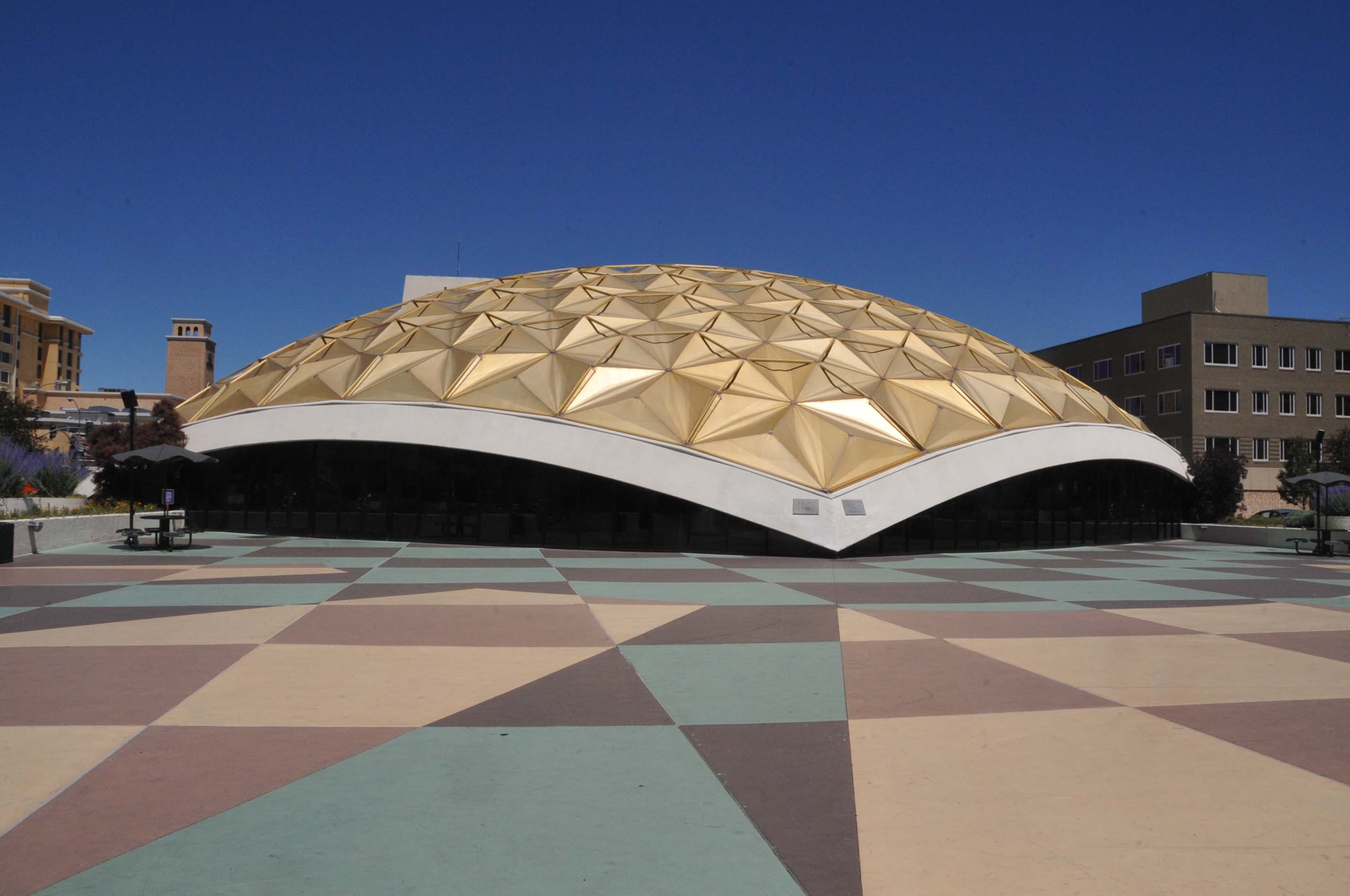

- Location within Nevada Location within the United States
- Location: 100 S. Virginia St., Reno, Nevada
- Coordinates: 39°31′27″N 119°48′37″W
- Built: 1967
- Architect: Bozalis, Dickinson and Roloff; TEMCOR
- Architectural style: Modern Movement, Geodesic Dome
- NRHP reference No.: 04001528
- Added to NRHP: January 19, 2005

The Pioneer Center for the Performing Arts (originally known as Pioneer Theater Auditorium) is a theater located in Reno, Nevada. It was designed by the Oklahoma City architectural firm of Bozalis, Dickinson and Roloff as a concrete structure with a distinctive gold geodesic dome roof. The facility was completed in 1967 with 987 seats on the main level and 513 seats in a balcony, totaling to 1,500. The co-founder of Temcor, the project's contractor, was Don Richter, a student of Buckminster Fuller, developer of the geodesic dome concept. Temcor had built several gold-anodized aluminum domes before the Pioneer, and was responsible for more than 5000 dome projects.

Originally to be called the Apollo Theater, the Pioneer took its name from a 1939 statue of a pioneer family by Byron S. Johnson, salvaged from the Old State Building, which was demolished to make way for the new facility. Unofficially, the dome was called the "Golden Turtle." It consists of a 500-panel aluminum shell on an inner steel frame, which is in turn supported by reinforced concrete arches. The orchestra level of the theater is depressed below ground level, allowing the roof to nearly touch the ground at the corners.

The Washoe County Fair and Recreation Board, which was responsible for the project, was particularly taken with Casa Mañana in Fort Worth, Texas, resulting in the selection of the domed concept. The Pioneer Center was placed on the National Register of Historic Places in 2005.

== See also ==
- Gold Dome, Oklahoma City, Oklahoma, also NRHP-listed
