= Adventure District =

Coordinates: 35°31′20″N 97°28′36″W

Oklahoma City's Adventure District is an area in Oklahoma City, roughly centered on NE 50th Street and Martin Luther King Avenue, that is home to several of the city's best-known attractions. The "Adventure District" designation was created in 2000 as a marketing effort by several of the area's businesses to market the area.

In 2003, the City of Oklahoma City recognized the area as an official entertainment district.

== Attractions ==
- 45th Infantry Division Museum
- Oklahoma City Zoological Park
- Science Museum Oklahoma
  - OmniDome Theatre
- National Softball Hall of Fame and Museum
- Oklahoma State Firefighters Museum
- Lincoln Park Golf Course
- Frontier City
- National Cowboy and Western Heritage Museum
- Remington Park
- Cinemark Tinseltown USA movie theater
- Coles Garden
