= Lincoln Terrace, Oklahoma City =

Neighborhood in Oklahoma City, Oklahoma, U.S.

Coordinates: 35°29′16″N 97°30′12″W

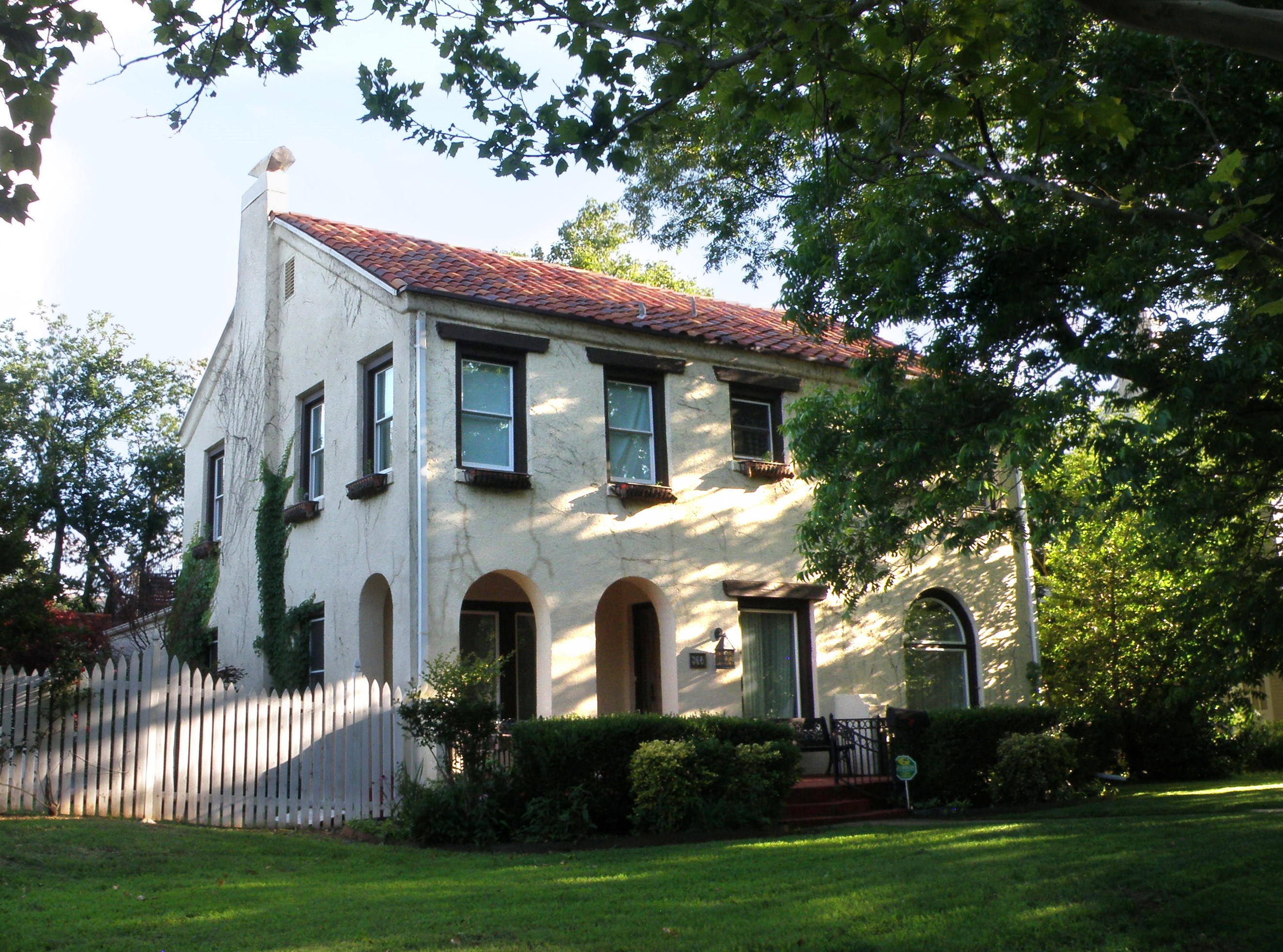
Oklahoma City, OK - Lincoln Terrace Historic District - 632 NE 15th St

Lincoln Terrace is a historic and diverse neighborhood in the Eastside district of Northeast Oklahoma City, located on either side of Lincoln Blvd just south of the Oklahoma State Capitol, between NE 13th and NE 23rd streets.] Most homes in the area were built during the decade (1920–30) after the erection of the state capitol. The neighborhood has undergone a renaissance in recent years in part as a result of the expansion of the Oklahoma Health Center district, anchored by the University of Oklahoma Health Sciences Center, on its south side.

Many of the homes in the neighborhood are in the Tudor Revival Style

Local businesses and organizations in the neighborhood include: Joy Mennonite Church (on NE 16th Street, west of Lincoln); Papa Dino's Pizza, and George's Happy Hog BBQ, (both on Culbertson Drive), and The OUHSC Faculty House (on NE 14th Street).

The western part of the neighborhood is currently recognized by the National Register of Historic Places as Capitol-Lincoln Terrace Historic District., while the eastern part of the neighborhood is recognized as the Lincoln Terrace East Historic District.
