= NW 39th Street Enclave =

Neighborhood in Oklahoma City, Oklahoma

Coordinates: 35°30′41″N 97°32′57″W

The NW 39th Street Enclave, also known as "The Strip," "The Gayborhood," "May-Penn," "39th & Penn" or simply "39th Street" is a prominent lesbian, gay, bisexual and transgender (LGBT) district in Oklahoma City, Oklahoma. The area is located along NW 39th Street in the city's northwest quadrant, one block west of Pennsylvania Avenue.

Northwest 39th Street Enclave is home to many of Oklahoma's most popular gay and lesbian bars and nightclubs, in addition to a number of retail stores, eateries, and apartment complexes catering to Oklahoma City's LGBT community. While Oklahoma City's openly gay population is relatively average for a city of its size, the NW 39th Street Enclave is widely regarded as the largest gay and lesbian district in the Great Plains and central regions of the United States, and one of the largest in the South.

The NW 39th Street district attracts large numbers of gay and lesbian tourists, particularly on weekends, from elsewhere in Oklahoma and from the surrounding states of Arkansas, Colorado, Kansas, Missouri, New Mexico, and Texas. The neighborhood is also a popular stopping point for cross-country LGBT travelers.
