= Asia District, Oklahoma City =

Neighborhood in Oklahoma City, Oklahoma, United States

Coordinates: 35°29′47″N 97°32′04″W

Oklahoma City's Asia District, also known as the Asian District, is the center of Asian culture and International cuisine and commerce in the state of Oklahoma. It contains the largest population of Asian Americans and descendants from Asia in the state.

Anchored by the Gold Dome and Classen Building at the intersection of Northwest 23rd Street and Classen Boulevard, and bordered by Oklahoma City University to the west and the Paseo Arts District to the east, the Asian district runs north along Classen Boulevard in central Oklahoma City from roughly Northwest 22nd Street up to Northwest 32nd Street.

The famous landmark "Milk Bottle Grocery" (built in 1910) is situated on Classen Boulevard and unofficially marks the entrance to the district. Scores of restaurants, travel outlets, international video stores, retail boutiques, nightclubs, supermarkets, and Asian-oriented service outlets appeal to Oklahoma City's large Asian populace and tourists alike.

== History ==
Before the area became known for its predominant Asian culture, the area surrounding Oklahoma City University between Classen and 23rd Street was incredibly high in crime and was at one point known as one of the most concentrated Crip neighborhoods in the central United States. Crime in the area began to die down in the mid 1990's, as both the expansion of Oklahoma City University and the influx of Vietnamese families began to push gang activity out of the area.

"Little Saigon" in the current area was first coined in 1975 when thousands of Vietnamese refugees came to Oklahoma City after the fall of Saigon.

The Vietnamese population has continued to grow since the first wave of immigrants landed just across the state line in Fort Chaffee, Arkansas. Relatives and friends joined them in Oklahoma City as stories of success reached the homeland in Vietnam, causing the population to grow significantly. The original refugees made Oklahoma City their home thanks to a handful of activists who brought hundreds out of the camp. Each refugee had to have an American sponsor before leaving the Arkansas barracks. The first refugees, most of whom did not speak English, left professional and military careers in Vietnam to become laborers such as brickmakers, builders, and warehouse workers in Oklahoma City. In time, many in the community became lawyers, doctors, and engineers, and started businesses in the Little Saigon portion of Asia District. They opened dental and chiropractor offices, nail salons, and insurance agencies in the area.

Immigrants also created a local chapter of the Vietnamese-American Association and the Vietnamese Buddhist Association, which recently broke ground on a new temple in Asia District.

=== Old Chinatown, Oklahoma City ===
The Little Saigon-influenced Asia District in North Central Oklahoma City is not the first Asian enclave in the central Oklahoma area, as the city once had an original historic Chinatown underground in Downtown Oklahoma City. Artifacts were discovered in 1969 when excavation occurred for the Myriad Convention Center within the blocks bordered by Sheridan (Grand) Avenue, EK Gaylord Boulevard, Reno Avenue, and Robinson Avenue.

Oklahoma City's Historic Chinatown consisted of a tunnel system underneath buildings and streets in downtown, centered in the vicinity of Main Street and Grand Avenue (now Sheridan) toward Broadway and Robinson Avenues, the extent of which is unknown and likely lost forever.
