= Oklahoma State Firefighters Museum =

Museum in Oklahoma City

Coordinates: 35°31′18″N 97°27′50″W

The Oklahoma State Firefighters Museum is a museum owned and administered by the Oklahoma State Firefighters Association (OSFA). The museum is financed by the dues collected from more than 9,000 firefighters, and is located at 2716 N.E. 50th Street in Oklahoma City, Oklahoma. The museum is devoted entirely to the preservation and display of antique fire apparatus and equipment. It contains a remarkable collection of antique gear, dating back to the mid-18th century, and also holds the first fire station in Oklahoma Territory, built in 1864. Many items from the oldest fire company in the United States, commanded by Benjamin Franklin, are on display. Exhibits also include the world's largest patch collection and the distinctive mural The Last Alarm. The building is also home to the Oklahoma State Firefighters Association (OSFA), the Oklahoma Fire Chiefs Association (OFCA), the Council on Firefighter Training (COFT) and the Oklahoma Retired Firefighters Association (ORFA) offices.

== History ==
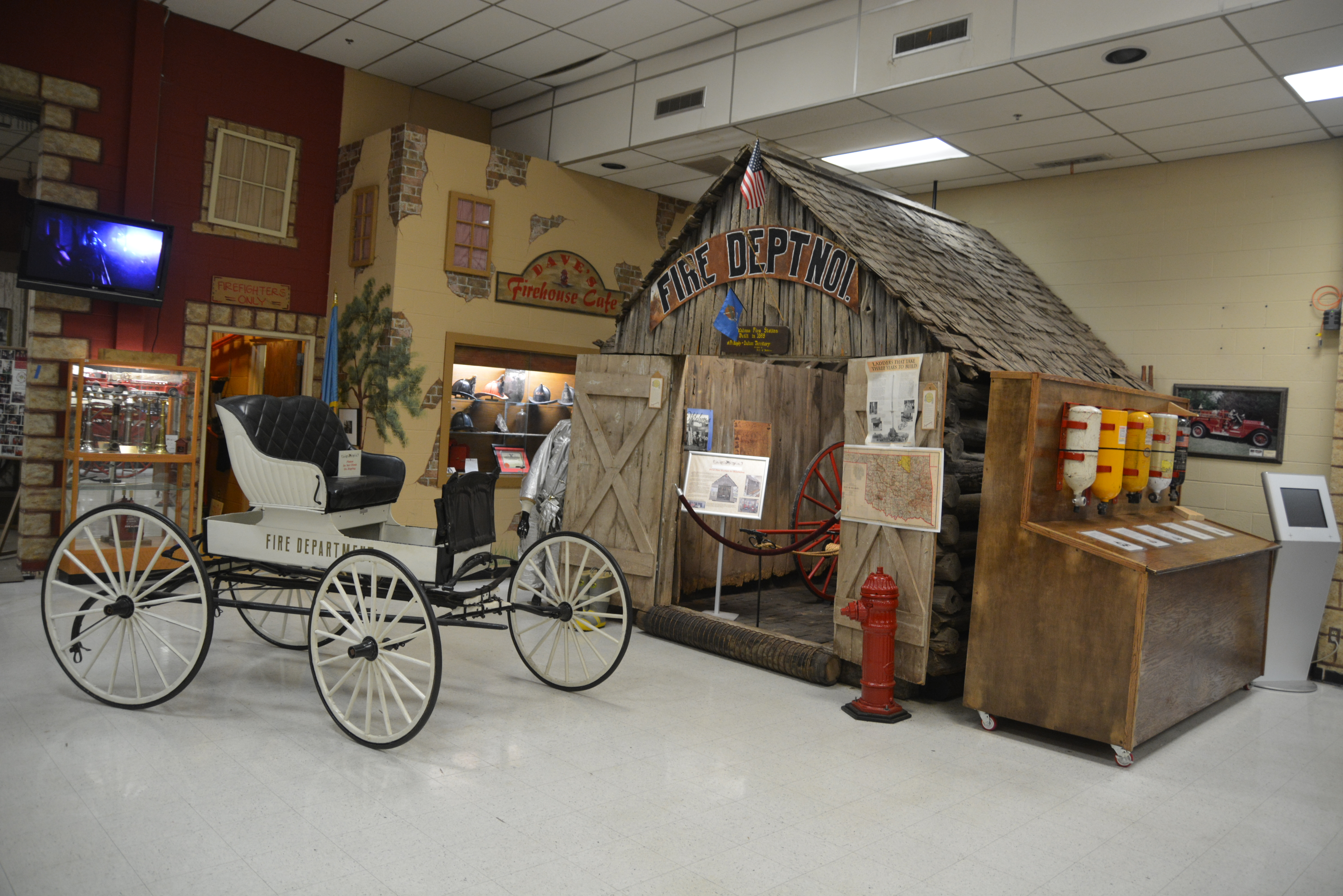
First Fire Station in Oklahoma

On July 18, 1966, the Directors of the Oklahoma State Firemen's Museum decided to use the municipal trust method to finance the museum, which at the time, was expected to cost $200,000. On December 14, 1966, the museum board met with the state insurance commissioner at the Will Rogers Memorial Building and was granted final approval for the location of the museum. Groundbreaking for the museum building was performed on April 6, 1967, though contractor bids were accepted up until January 9, 1968. The building was deemed complete on March 1, 1969, and the museum officially opened to the public the next day on March 2, 1969.

John Knupple was the first Curator of the Firefighters Museum and served from June 1, 1970, until December 31, 1971. In January 1972, Sam Oruch, an active firefighter for the Oklahoma City Fire Department, became the part-time curator; after Oruch retired as a full-time firefighter, he was hired full-time to care for the museum. Oruch gave tours in the Museum for over 33 years and is the last one to hold the title of curator. Jim Sanders, a veteran of the Bethany, Oklahoma Fire Department, became the museum director in 2004. Mike Billingsley, a retired firefighter from the Nichols Hills Fire Department, was the next to take the title of museum director in September 2006. In 2014, Gene Brown, a retired firefighter from The Village, took over as museum director and still is to this day.
