= Mesta Park =

- U.S. National Register of Historic Places
- U.S. Historic district
- Location: Roughly bounded by NW 16th and 23rd Sts. and Western and Walker Aves., Oklahoma City, Oklahoma
- Area: 165 acres (67 ha)
- Architectural style: Classical Revival, Bungalow/craftsman, Mission/spanish Revival
- NRHP reference No.: 83002102
- Added to NRHP: July 26, 1983

Mesta Park is a residential neighborhood in Oklahoma City, Oklahoma which is also listed as a historic district on the National Register of Historic Places. The listing is roughly bounded by NW 16th and 23rd Sts. and Western and Walker Avenues. It was listed on the National Register in 1983 and then included 522 contributing buildings and one contributing site on 165 acres (67 ha).

The area was built in stages during 1906 to 1930, with about half completed by 1915. It's named for Washington, D.C. socialite Perle Mesta (née Skirvin) who lived there as a teen.
