= Film exchange =

Business that rented films to movie theaters primarily during the silent film era

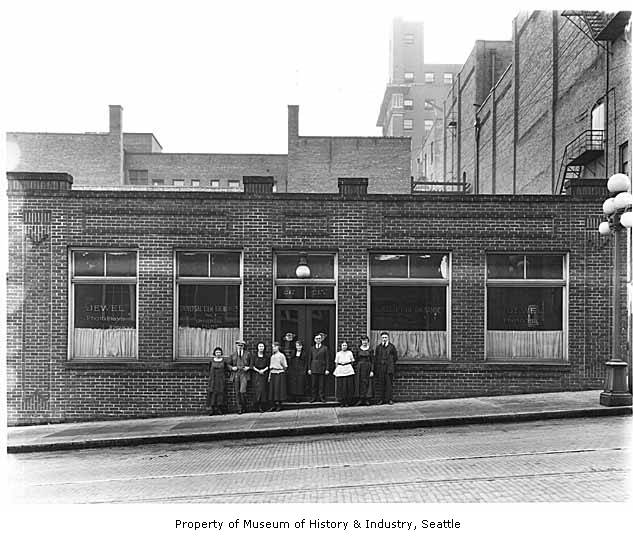
Universal Film Exchange in Seattle, Washington, in 1918.

A film exchange was a business in film distribution that rented out movies to theaters. They opened up all over the United States to handle film reels during the silent film era.

Film exchanges were often a separate business from production. Buildings were constructed for film exchange operations and "film rows" of different company's exchanges developed in some cities. As the cellulose nitrate used as the film base in the early days was flammable, designs for film exchanges included buildings with vented vaults, and fire prevention was a concern.

Prior to the development of film exchanges, a theater might purchase a film, which at that time would have cost about $100 per reel, and show it until either it was worn out or its entertainment value was exhausted. In 1905 an exchange started in San Francisco to rent films to Grauman's theater for $50 for the first week, and then to a theater in Oakland for $50 for the second week, with any subsequent rentals being a profit. This exchange operated from a floor of a boarding house located on Turk Street.

William Fox, who had nickelodeon businesses, established a film exchange in Brooklyn. Eugene Cline was a major figure in Chicago's fast developing film exchange business. In 1906, Carl Laemmle opened his first film exchange in Chicago, because he needed to secure good quality films for his own nickelodeons. He found it impractical to buy movies: manufacturers were hard to reach, their products were difficult to evaluate and not affordable, if he had to change the program several times a week or even daily.

The Imperial Film Exchange in New York City was established in 1908 and grew to be one of the largest in the United States. Harry Weiss' Hybar Film Exchange was one of the largest in the southern U.S.

J. D. Williams was involved in the film exchange business in the Pacific Northwest. Metro's film exchange business in Chicago grew to supply hundreds of theaters.
