= Gold Dome =

Historic building in Oklahoma, US

- Citizens State Bank
- U.S. National Register of Historic Places
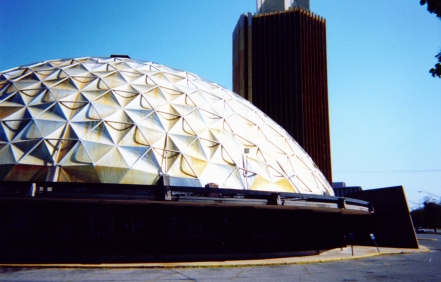
- The Gold Dome as viewed from Classen Boulevard

- Location within Oklahoma Location within the United States
- Location: 1112 NW 23rd Street, Oklahoma City, Oklahoma
- Coordinates: 35°29′34″N 97°31′51″W
- Built: 1958
- Built by: Secor Construction Co.
- Architect: Bailey, Bozalis, Dickinson & Roloff
- Architectural style: Modern Movement, Geodesic Dome
- NRHP reference No.: 03000875
- Added to NRHP: September 4, 2003

The Gold Dome is a geodesic dome in Oklahoma City, Oklahoma, United States. It was built in 1958 and is located at the intersection of NW 23rd Street (formerly US 66) and North Classen Boulevard. It was listed in the National Register of Historic Places in 2002.

== Design and construction ==
In 1958, the Citizens State Bank began construction. The Gold Dome building was the fifth geodesic dome constructed in the world and the first to be used as a bank. It was described as "one of the nation's most revolutionary bank designs." Using the geodesic dome design created by futurist and architect Buckminster Fuller, the architects for the Citizens State Bank, Bailey, Bozalis, Dickinson, and Roloff of Oklahoma City created this unusual Oklahoma City landmark. The dome is constructed of 625 panels, ranging in size from 7.5 to 11.5 feet (3.5 m) in length, 60 – 70 pounds in weight each, and spanning a diameter of 145 feet (44 m). The interior covers about 27,000 square feet. The Gold Dome bank was an approximately $1 million investment.

== History ==
In 1998, the Oklahoma City Government pursued a new zoning area along NW 23rd Street, including the area where the Gold Dome is located in order to preserve the unique architecture and "commercial nature" of NW 23rd Street, the former path of Route 66 through central Oklahoma City. Twenty-third Street is located between the urban conservation districts of the Paseo and Jefferson Park to the north, and the historic preservation districts of Mesta Park and Heritage Hills to the south. The new zoning area would require property owners to gain permission from a design review board before demolishing or modifying buildings in this area.

In July 2001 Bank One, which owned the Gold Dome building, applied to the Urban Design Commission (the result of 1998 efforts) for permission to demolish the building. The bank stated that the structure was too large to serve as a bank and refurbishing it would be too costly (Bank One estimated it would cost roughly $1.7 million). The bank intended to sell the property to Walgreens, which would place the new pharmacy across the street from its competitor, Eckerd.

A group organized to save the Gold Dome, "Citizens for the Golden Dome", appealed to the Bank One president, urging him not only to save the building in deference to its unique history and contribution to the "urban character" of OKC, but to also apply for landmark zoning from the OKC Historic Preservation and Landmark Commission, and apply for listing on the National Register of Historic Places.

In August 2001, the Bank One president offered different alternatives to demolition of the building, including constructing a smaller building on a portion of the property to serve as the Bank One location next door to the gold dome building. The president left a sixty-day window for prospective buyers interested in saving the building to come forward, but did not state what would happen if no one offered to buy the building.

The State Historic Preservation Office declared the building eligible for landmark status, although usually reserved for buildings at least 50 years old.

A Bethany company, Blue Stuff, seemed to be the only viable hope for preservation of the Gold Dome. Blue Stuff planned to move into the building, having outgrown its own location. The company's spokesman did not feel the Gold Dome would be as costly to repair as Bank One claimed.

Efforts to save the Gold Dome included picketing and marches, but in September 2001, a couple extended the efforts by writing a song. Also, an Oklahoma-based company, Sonic Drive-In restaurants, offered up a billboard, located across the street from the Gold Dome, to the Citizens for the Golden Dome group. On the billboard was written "Stop the demolition of our historic landmark," as well as the phone numbers for Bank One and Walgreens.

By December 2001, after several reprieves by the bank president, the time allotted by Bank One for buyers wanting to preserve the Gold Dome to come forward was up. However, the Bank One officials agreed once again to extend the postponement of demolition until January. Bank One stated they were open to other alternatives, but would have to go forward with plans to sell the building to Walgreens if a buyer did not come forward. Bank One even offered to help save the actual dome and have it transplanted to another site.

An ownership group was formed, Gold Dome LLC, to take over financing of the building to save it.

As of April 2011, Gold Dome owner an optometrist named Irene Lam had not maintained payment on the loans secured by the Oklahoma City Council through United States Department of Housing and Urban Development (HUD) for the building. On April 12, 2011 the Oklahoma City council voted to take over responsibility to pay back the loan to HUD.

Irene Lam fell behind on her property tax obligations, failing to fulfill nearly fifty thousand dollars in property tax obligations to the City of Oklahoma City and only repaying interest upon the federal loan . Bank 7 in Oklahoma City foreclosed on the property and The Gold Dome was put up for auction on September 13, 2012 David Box, a local OKC developer, purchased the Gold Dome at the public auction for $800,000. He claimed in September 2012 to have no plans to tear it down, but reversed this stance in March 2013, applying for a demolition permit for the historic structure which the city has refused to issue.

In June 2013, Edmond environmental engineering firm TEEMCO announced plans to renovate the Gold Dome and move its 65-person operation into the building. Changes to the building included large saltwater and freshwater fish tanks being placed in the lobby, as well as a digital touchscreen wall for guests to interact with. However, in March 2015, Gold Dome owner David Box announced that the property was back on the market after TEEMCO had fallen into financial distress with falling oil prices.

In May 2015, Land Run Commercial Properties purchased the building for $1.1 million. The new developers filed for a $2.5 million building permit in August 2016 to convert the building into a Natural Grocers store and preserve the dome.

Land Run Commercial Properties entered negotiations with TempleLive in 2021. The company operates live music venues at historic Masonic temples in Ohio, Arkansas, and Kansas and is examining the feasibility of converting the Gold Dome into a concert venue.

== See also ==
- Pioneer Center for the Performing Arts, Reno, Nevada, similar dome, NRHP-listed
