= Paseo Arts District =

Neighborhood in Uptown Oklahoma City

Coordinates: 35°29′58″N 97°31′21″W

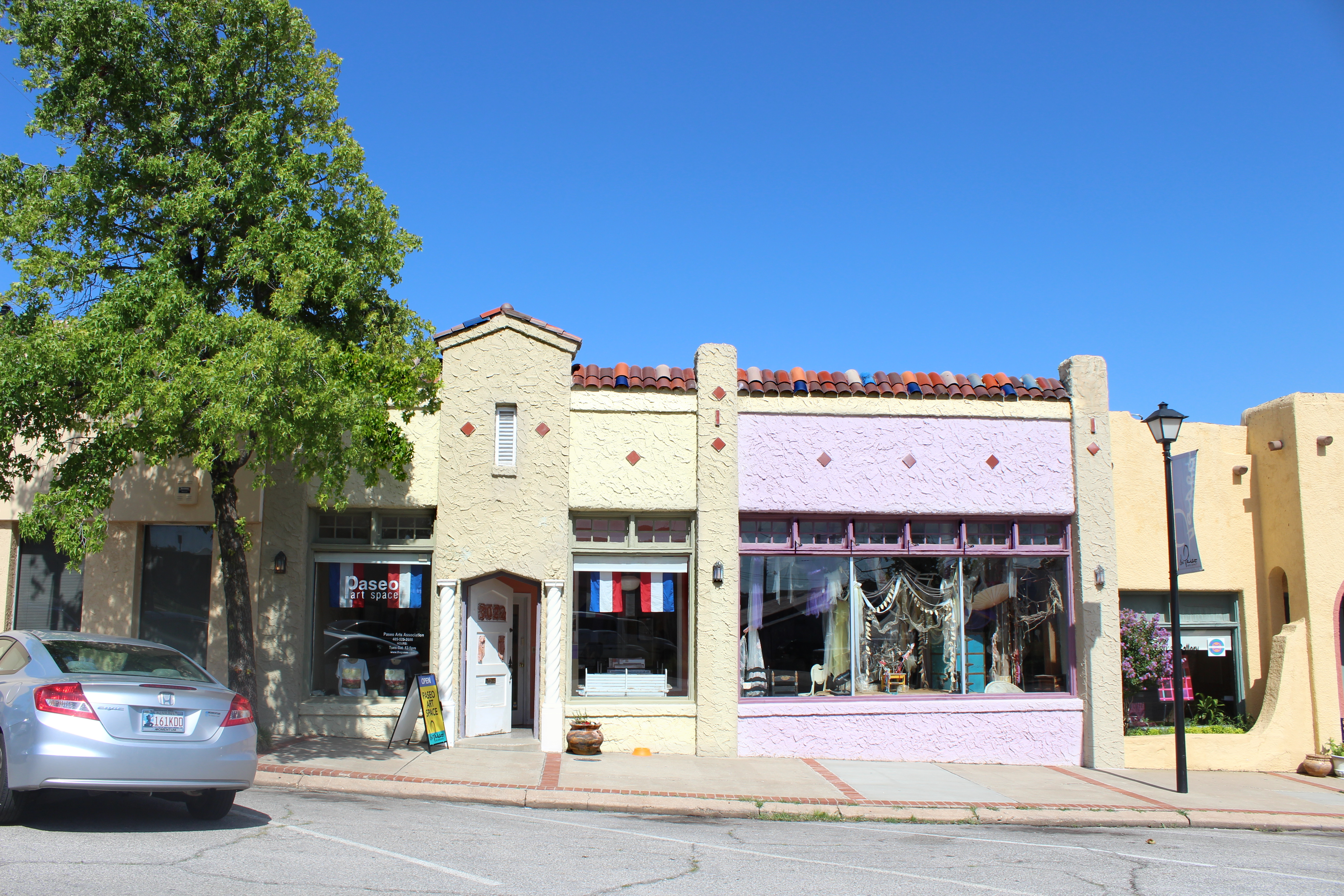
A building in the district, 2014

The Paseo Arts District, originally referred to as the Spanish Village, was built in 1929 as the first commercial shopping district north of Downtown Oklahoma City by Oklahoman G.A. Nichols.

Early business in the area included a swimming pool called the Paseo Plunge, a dry cleaner, drug store, shoe repair store, and restaurants. The Spanish Village era is said to have ended in the mid-1950s.

== Renewal ==
Paseo has undergone transformations; currently, the Paseo is enjoying a renaissance since the 1980s. Today, a vibrant group of artists and other interested people are transforming this community through creative thinking and arts activities.

Located along Paseo Drive at roughly N. Walker Ave and NW 28th Street, the faux Spanish village with its stucco buildings and clay tile roofs is the home to many of Oklahoma City's Artists. It is also home to a number of chic bars, restaurants, boutiques, nightclubs, art galleries, and avant-garde businesses.

== Events ==
Since 1975, Paseo hosts the annual Paseo Arts Festival each Memorial Day weekend, which showcases original works of visual and performing arts. Other events within the Paseo Arts district include its annual Fairy Ball, as well as the First Friday Gallery Walk. The First Friday Gallery Walk is an event in which Paseo art galleries and restaurants host Art Opening Receptions on the first Friday of every month to display new artist's work and invite people to visit the Paseo district.

== Historic church ==
The district is also home to the oldest church in Oklahoma, Old Trinity of Paseo. The former Anglican church was built in New Brunswick, Canada in 1842 and was closed in 1990. Oklahoma City photographer Tom Lee purchased the church in 2000 and had it dismantled and moved to Oklahoma City to serve as his studio. Lee sold the church in 2007 to be rented as a venue for weddings and other events.

== Recognition ==
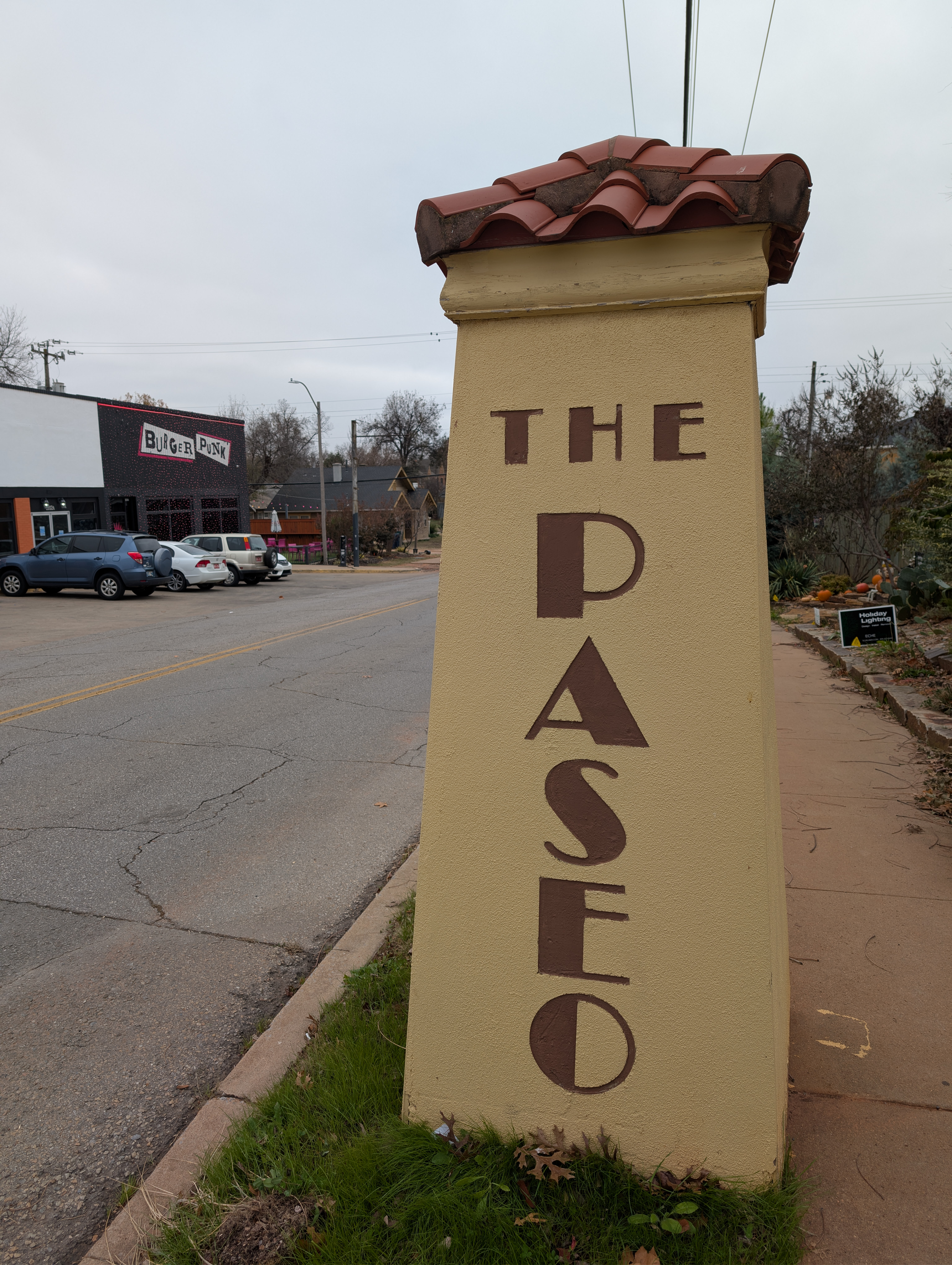
neighborhood welcome sign

The Paseo district is listed as a neighborhood ‘worthy of preservation’ on the National Register of Historic Places and in 2010, was named as one of the ’10 Great Neighborhoods for 2010’ by the American Planning Association.

Among the galleries in the district is JRB Art at the Elms Gallery, housed in the former home of painter and museum director Nan Sheets.
