= List of cemeteries in Oklahoma =

This list of cemeteries in Oklahoma includes currently operating, historical (closed for new interments), and defunct (graves abandoned or removed) cemeteries, columbaria, and mausolea which are historical and/or notable. It does not include pet cemeteries.

== Cleveland County ==
Smith Cemetery in Moore

== Comanche County ==
- Fort Sill National Cemetery in Elgin

== Garfield County ==
- Enid Cemetery in Enid; NRHP-listed

== Lincoln County ==
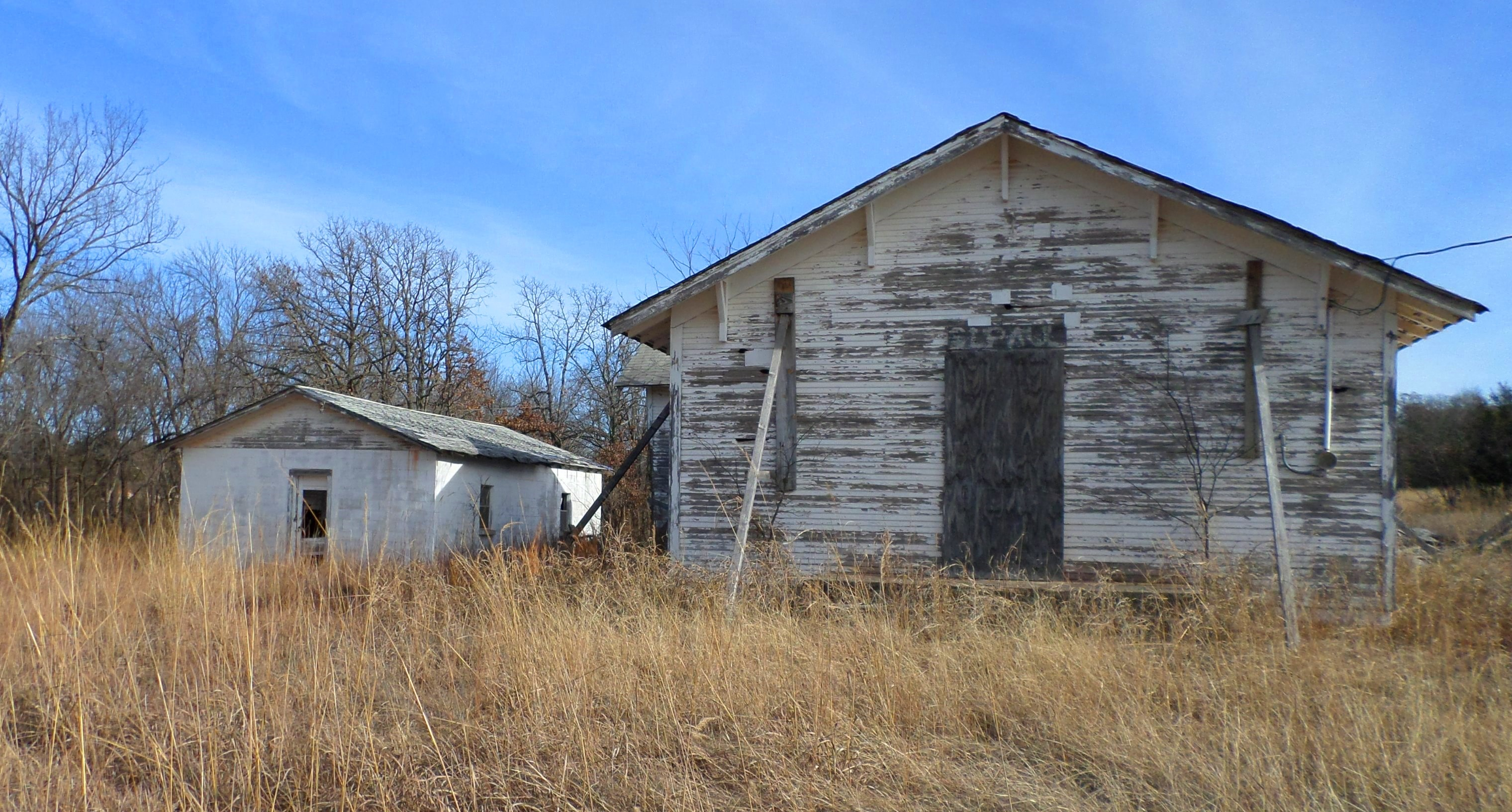
St. Paul Baptist Church near Meeker, Lincoln County

- St. Paul Baptist Church and Cemetery in Meeker; NRHP-listed

== Logan County ==
- Summit View Cemetery in Guthrie

== Muskogee County ==
- Fort Gibson National Cemetery in Fort Gibson

== Oklahoma County ==
- Gower Cemetery in Edmond; NRHP-listed
- Rose Hill Burial Park in Oklahoma City

== Ottawa County ==
- Modoc Mission Church and Cemetery in Miami; NRHP-listed

== Tulsa County ==
- Oaklawn Cemetery in Tulsa
- Memorial Park Cemetery in Tulsa
- Perryman Cemetery in Tulsa

== See also ==
- List of cemeteries in the United States
