= National Register of Historic Places listings in Oklahoma County, Oklahoma =

Location of Oklahoma County in Oklahoma

This is a list of the properties and districts on the National Register of Historic Places in Oklahoma County, Oklahoma, United States. The locations of National Register properties and districts for which the latitude and longitude coordinates are included below, may be seen in a map. The county lists 173 properties and districts on the National Register. Another 3 properties were once listed but have since been removed.

This National Park Service list is complete through NPS recent listings posted October 16, 2026.

== Current listings ==
	Name on the Register	Image	Date listed	Location	City or town	Description
1	1210–1212–1214 North Hudson Historic District		March 15, 2018 (#100002218)	1210–1214 North Hudson; 35°28′51″N 97°31′09″W	Oklahoma City	
2	"Ringing the Wild Horse" Site	"Ringing the Wild Horse" Site	January 25, 1971 (#71001081)	Northwest of Jones; 35°36′07″N 97°20′01″W	Jones	
3	American Legion Hut	American Legion Hut	December 2, 1993 (#93001336)	Southwestern corner of the junction of 5th and Little Sts. 35°39′00″N 97°28′47″W	Edmond	
4	Arcadia Round Barn	Arcadia Round Barn	December 23, 1977 (#77001094)	107 E. Highway 66; 35°39′44″N 97°19′32″W	Arcadia	
5	Arcadia Route 66 Roadbed	Arcadia Route 66 Roadbed	November 30, 1999 (#99001424)	Extends south-southeast from the junction of State Highway 66 and Hiwassee Rd. 35°39′43″N 97°17′43″W	Arcadia	
6	Automobile Alley Historic District	Automobile Alley Historic District	March 18, 1999 (#99000351)	Roughly along Broadway Ave., from NW. 4th St. to W. Park Place, and roughly along NW. 10th St.; also north side of 000 Block of NW 6th St. 35°28′33″N 97°30′53″W	Oklahoma City	Second set of addresses represent a boundary increase approved June 4, 2021
7	Avery Building	Avery Building	August 12, 1983 (#83002097)	15 E. California Ave. 35°27′56″N 97°30′39″W	Oklahoma City	
8	Baptist Building		September 4, 2025 (#100012199)	1141 N. Robinson Ave. 35°28′48″N 97°30′58″W	Oklahoma City	
9	Booher Site (OK48)		February 14, 1979 (#79003641)	Address Restricted	Luther	
10	Bourne Dairy	Bourne Dairy	October 3, 1979 (#79003642)	5801 Eastern St. 35°31′48″N 97°28′37″W	Oklahoma City	
11	William L. Bradford Building	William L. Bradford Building	April 4, 2022 (#100007545)	27 East Sheridan Ave. 35°27′59″N 97°30′40″W	Oklahoma City	
12	Braniff Building	Braniff Building	February 28, 1980 (#80003281)	324 N. Robinson St. 35°28′15″N 97°30′57″W	Oklahoma City	Renovations began 2012
13	Brockway Community Center		March 15, 2021 (#100005862)	1440 North Everest Ave. 35°29′01″N 97°29′29″W	Oklahoma City	
14	Frank and Merle Buttram House and Grounds	Frank and Merle Buttram House and Grounds	September 11, 1990 (#90001367)	7316 Nichols Rd. 35°33′26″N 97°31′58″W	Nichols Hills	
15	Cain's Coffee Building	Cain's Coffee Building	February 4, 1982 (#82004854)	1 12th St., NW. 35°28′53″N 97°30′43″W	Oklahoma City	
16	Calvary Baptist Church	Calvary Baptist Church	December 19, 1978 (#78002244)	2nd and Walnut Sts. 35°28′11″N 97°30′30″W	Oklahoma City	
17	Capitol Hill Commercial Historic District	Capitol Hill Commercial Historic District	July 15, 2019 (#100004178)	100–400 SW 25th St./ W. Commercial Ave. 35°26′22″N 97°31′06″W	Oklahoma City	
18	Capitol Hill General Hospital	Capitol Hill General Hospital	March 13, 2020 (#100005082)	2400 South Harvey Ave. 35°26′29″N 97°31′05″W	Oklahoma City	
19	Capitol-Lincoln Terrace Historic District	Capitol-Lincoln Terrace Historic District	September 30, 1976 (#76001569)	Irregular pattern roughly bounded by 13th, 23rd, Lincoln Boulevard, and Kelley Ave. 35°29′15″N 97°30′02″W	Oklahoma City	
20	Carey Place Historic District	Carey Place Historic District	October 1, 1998 (#98001224)	1800–2100 blocks of Carey Pl. 35°29′21″N 97°32′28″W	Oklahoma City	
21	Cartmill Farm House	Cartmill Farm House	September 6, 2006 (#06000795)	21751 N. Macarthur Boulevard; 35°41′33″N 97°37′15″W	Edmond	
22	Carverdale Historic District		June 4, 2025 (#100011887)	Bound bv East Park Place, Bellevidere Drive and Windemere Avenue; 35°28′49″N 97°28′14″W	Oklahoma City	
23	J.I. Case Plow Works Building	J.I. Case Plow Works Building	August 12, 1983 (#83002098)	2 E. California Ave. 35°27′54″N 97°30′41″W	Oklahoma City	
24	Central High School	Central High School	November 7, 1976 (#76001570)	817 N. Robinson Ave. 35°28′32″N 97°30′59″W	Oklahoma City	
25	Citizens Bank Tower	Citizens Bank Tower	March 8, 2010 (#09000978)	2200 N. Classen Boulevard; 35°29′31″N 97°31′50″W	Oklahoma City	Now known as The Classen
26	Citizens State Bank	Citizens State Bank	March 13, 1980 (#80003279)	102 S. Broadway; 35°39′14″N 97°28′51″W	Edmond	
27	Citizens State Bank	Citizens State Bank	September 4, 2003 (#03000875)	1112 NW. 23rd 35°29′34″N 97°31′51″W	Oklahoma City	
28	Clyde's Supermarket and T.G.&Y.		May 23, 2024 (#100010404)	1100 N. Walker Ave. and 429 NW 10th St. 35°28′44″N 97°31′15″W	Oklahoma City	
29	Colcord Building	Colcord Building	November 7, 1976 (#76001571)	Robinson and Sheridan; 35°28′00″N 97°31′00″W	Oklahoma City	
30	Cotton-Exchange Building	Cotton-Exchange Building	March 18, 1980 (#80003282)	218 N. Harvey St. 35°28′11″N 97°31′03″W	Oklahoma City	
31	Crown Heights Historic District	Crown Heights Historic District	December 28, 1995 (#95001467)	Roughly bounded by NW. 36th St., N. Western Ave., NW. 43rd St., and N. Walker Ave. 35°30′41″N 97°31′31″W	Oklahoma City	
32	Czech Hall of Oklahoma City-Lodge Laska	Czech Hall of Oklahoma City-Lodge Laska	June 3, 2015 (#15000328)	515 SW. 6th St. 35°27′32″N 97°31′19″W	Oklahoma City	
33	Old Douglass High School	Old Douglass High School	April 4, 2007 (#07000259)	600 N. High Ave. 35°28′31″N 97°29′38″W	Oklahoma City	Converted to apartments.
34	Dunbar Elementary School	Dunbar Elementary School	March 15, 2018 (#100002217)	1432 NE 7th St. 35°28′29″N 97°29′12″W	Oklahoma City	Converted to apartments.
35	Edgemere Park Historic District		November 12, 1980 (#80003283)	Roughly bounded by Robinson and Walker and NW. 30 and NW. 36; 35°30′12″N 97°31′02″W	Oklahoma City	
36	Edmond Armory	Edmond Armory	March 14, 1991 (#91000275)	431 S. Boulevard; 35°39′00″N 97°28′41″W	Edmond	
37	Edmond Ice Company	Edmond Ice Company	June 14, 2016 (#16000371)	101–109 W. 2nd St. 35°39′12″N 97°29′04″W	Edmond	
38	Edwards Heights Historic District		September 7, 2005 (#05001003)	Roughly bounded by NE. 16th St., N. Page Ave., NE. Success St. and N. Bryant Ave., extension on NE. Grand Boulevard; 35°29′18″N 97°27′52″W	Oklahoma City	
39	Edwards Historic District		October 3, 1996 (#96001028)	Roughly bounded by N. Page Ave., NE. 16th St., NE. Grand Boulevard, and E. Park Pl. 35°29′00″N 97°27′59″W	Oklahoma City	
40	Walter J. and Frances W. Edwards House	Walter J. and Frances W. Edwards House	September 8, 1994 (#94001084)	1621 NE. Grand Boulevard; 35°29′08″N 97°27′56″W	Oklahoma City	
41	Electric Transformer House	Electric Transformer House	June 14, 2016 (#16000372)	2412 N. Olie Ave. 35°29′36″N 97°31′43″W	Oklahoma City	
42	Elks Lodge Building	Elks Lodge Building	March 10, 1980 (#80003284)	401 N. Harvey St. 35°28′16″N 97°31′10″W	Oklahoma City	
43	Elks Victory Lodge-Ruby's Grill Building	Elks Victory Lodge-Ruby's Grill Building	January 11, 1996 (#95001498)	322 NE. 2nd 35°28′10″N 97°30′22″W	Oklahoma City	
44	Engels' Dry Goods Store	Engels' Dry Goods Store	March 3, 1980 (#80003280)	114 S. Main St. 35°39′42″N 97°11′43″W	Luther	
45	Fairchild Winery		March 13, 1975 (#75001570)	1600 81st St., NE. 35°33′16″N 97°29′10″W	Oklahoma City	
46	Farmers Public Market	Farmers Public Market	December 2, 1982 (#82001497)	311 S. Klein St. 35°27′46″N 97°31′59″W	Oklahoma City	
47	Federal Building and United States Court House	Federal Building and United States Court House	September 8, 2021 (#100006876)	200 NW 4th St. 35°28′22″N 97°31′01″W	Oklahoma City	
48	Fidelity National Building	Fidelity National Building	March 6, 2008 (#08000151)	200 N. Harvey Ave. 35°28′15″N 97°31′04″W	Oklahoma City	Now the Park Harvey Apartments
49	Film Exchange Historic District	Film Exchange Historic District	September 6, 2007 (#07000908)	Junction of W. Sheridan Ave. and Lee Ave. 35°27′59″N 97°31′26″W	Oklahoma City	
50	First Christian Church	First Christian Church	March 8, 1984 (#84003383)	1104 N. Robinson Ave. 35°28′43″N 97°31′35″W	Oklahoma City	
51	First Christian Church Historic District	First Christian Church Historic District	March 14, 2011 (#11000081)	3700 N. Walker Ave. 35°30′33″N 97°31′06″W	Oklahoma City	Demolished on September 26, 2022
52	First Church of Christ, Scientist	First Church of Christ, Scientist	September 9, 2001 (#01000949)	1200 N. Robinson Ave. 35°29′07″N 97°31′09″W	Oklahoma City	
53	First National Bank and Trust Company Building	First National Bank and Trust Company Building	March 15, 2018 (#100002220)	120 N. Robinson Ave. and 111 N. Broadway Ave. 35°28′06″N 97°30′56″W	Oklahoma City	
54	First Unitarian Church of Oklahoma City		March 31, 2022 (#100007543)	600 NW 13th St; 35°28′57″N 97°31′24″W	Oklahoma City	
55	Gatewood East Historic District	Gatewood East Historic District	March 3, 2004 (#04000126)	NW. 16th to north of NW. 22nd, N. Classen Boulevard to N. Blackwelder Ave., and N. Florida Ave. 35°29′17″N 97°32′09″W	Oklahoma City	
56	Gatewood West Historic District	Gatewood West Historic District	March 3, 2004 (#04000125)	NW. 16th to NW. 23rd, N. Blackwelder Ave. and N. Florida Ave. to Pennsylvania Ave. 35°29′22″N 97°32′36″W	Oklahoma City	
57	Gower Cemetery	Gower Cemetery	December 27, 1991 (#91001895)	Covel Rd. between Douglas and Post Rds. 35°40′53″N 97°21′37″W	Edmond	
58	W.T. Hales House	W.T. Hales House	March 29, 1978 (#78002245)	1521 N. Hudson Ave. 35°29′09″N 97°31′09″W	Oklahoma City	
59	Harbour-Longmire Building	Harbour-Longmire Building	March 3, 1980 (#80003285)	420 W. Main St. 35°28′03″N 97°31′12″W	Oklahoma City	
60	Harding Junior High School	Harding Junior High School	March 13, 2002 (#02000172)	3333 N. Shartel Ave. 35°30′32″N 97°31′33″W	Oklahoma City	
61	Harmony School	Harmony School	December 2, 2019 (#100004742)	1537 NE 24th St. 35°29′42″N 97°29′02″W	Oklahoma City	
62	Harn House	Harn House	April 13, 1973 (#73001566)	NE. 17th St. and Stiles; 35°29′11″N 97°30′24″W	Oklahoma City	
63	Haywood Building	Haywood Building	January 11, 1996 (#95001499)	307 NE. 2nd 35°28′11″N 97°30′25″W	Oklahoma City	
64	Dr. William L. and Susie Price Haywood Estate		December 4, 2024 (#100011141)	7100 North Sooner Road; 35°32′37″N 97°25′27″W	Oklahoma City	
65	Heierding Building	Heierding Building	March 10, 1982 (#82003692)	35 Harrison Ave. 35°28′21″N 97°30′39″W	Oklahoma City	
66	Heritage Hills Historic and Architectural District	Heritage Hills Historic and Architectural District	June 4, 1979 (#79002006)	Roughly bounded by Robinson and Walker Aves., 14th, 15th, and 21st Sts., and Classen Boulevard; 35°29′12″N 97°31′20″W	Oklahoma City	
67	Heritage Hills East Historic District		September 17, 2020 (#100005558)	Bounded by NW 14th Street, North Broadway Ave., NW 22nd St., and North Robinson Ave. 35°29′17″N 97°30′56″W	Oklahoma City	
68	Hightower Building	Hightower Building	March 13, 2002 (#02000176)	105 N. Hudson; 35°28′11″N 97°31′11″W	Oklahoma City	
69	Hopewell Baptist Church	Hopewell Baptist Church	September 14, 2002 (#02001018)	5801 NW. 178th St. 35°39′11″N 97°37′13″W	Edmond	
70	India Temple Shrine Building	India Temple Shrine Building	March 26, 1980 (#80003286)	621 N. Robinson Ave. 35°28′25″N 97°30′58″W	Oklahoma City	Also known as the Journal Record Building. Built by Freemasons in 1923; later used for offices; damaged in the 1995 Oklahoma City bombing; now houses the Oklahoma City National Memorial Museum.
71	Iroquois Apartments	Iroquois Apartments	December 2, 2019 (#100004741)	900 NW 13th St. 35°28′56″N 97°31′38″W	Oklahoma City	
72	Jefferson Park Historic District	Jefferson Park Historic District	December 14, 1995 (#95001466)	Roughly bounded by NW. 23rd St., N. Walker Ave., NW. 30th St., and I-235; 35°29′49″N 97°31′03″W	Oklahoma City	
73	Jewel Theater	Jewel Theater	September 3, 2009 (#09000686)	904 NE 4th St. 35°28′16″N 97°29′49″W	Oklahoma City	
74	Charles G. Jones Farmstead	Charles G. Jones Farmstead	June 14, 2001 (#01000658)	12061 NE 108th St. 35°34′52″N 97°18′34″W	Jones	
75	Jurhee Apartments		September 14, 2021 (#100006905)	1312-1316 North Francis Ave. 35°28′55″N 97°31′38″W	Oklahoma City	
76	Kaiser's Ice Cream Parlour	Kaiser's Ice Cream Parlour	November 28, 1978 (#78002246)	1039 N. Walker Ave. 35°28′43″N 97°31′16″W	Oklahoma City	
77	Kelley Club	Kelley Club	September 10, 2014 (#14000594)	2300 N. Kelley Ave. 35°29′33″N 97°29′40″W	Oklahoma City	
78	Kingman-More Building	Kingman-More Building	August 12, 1983 (#83002100)	100 E. California Ave. 35°27′54″N 97°30′36″W	Oklahoma City	
79	Kivlehen House	Kivlehen House	December 4, 2008 (#08001150)	525 N. Jackson St. 35°39′39″N 97°28′37″W	Edmond	
80	Lake Overholser Bridge	Lake Overholser Bridge	March 2, 2004 (#04000133)	N. Overholser Dr., 0.5 miles (0.80 km) west of N. Council Rd. 35°30′51″N 97°37′49″W	Oklahoma City	
81	Lake Overholser Dam	Lake Overholser Dam	June 5, 2007 (#07000518)	NW. 16th St. and E. Lake Overholser Dr. 35°29′10″N 97°39′54″W	Oklahoma City	
82	Lincoln Park Bathhouse		September 12, 2016 (#16000620)	2000 Remington Place; 35°31′30″N 97°28′12″W	Oklahoma City	
83	Lincoln Plaza Historic District		March 15, 2016 (#16000086)	4345–4545 N. Lincoln Boulevard and 416 NE. 46th St. 35°31′06″N 97°30′11″W	Oklahoma City	
84	Lincoln Terrace East Historic District	Lincoln Terrace East Historic District	March 3, 2004 (#04000124)	Roughly bounded by Kelley Ave, NE. 16th St., Philips Ave., NE. 14th St., Lindsay Ave., Culbertston Dr., and NE. 21st St. 35°29′15″N 97°29′49″W	Oklahoma City	
85	Littlepage Building	Littlepage Building	January 11, 1996 (#95001500)	219 N. Central Ave. 35°28′10″N 97°30′27″W	Oklahoma City	
86	Melvin F. Luster House	Melvin F. Luster House	June 7, 1983 (#83002101)	300 3rd St., NE. 35°28′14″N 97°30′25″W	Oklahoma City	
87	Sidney and Mary Lyons House and Commercial Historic District		June 10, 2021 (#100006628)	300-304 NE 3rd St., 316 North Central Ave. 35°28′12″N 97°30′26″W	Oklahoma City	
88	Mager Mortgage Company Building	Mager Mortgage Company Building	June 14, 2013 (#13000392)	231 NW 10th St. 35°28′42″N 97°31′03″W	Oklahoma City	
89	Magnolia Petroleum Building	Magnolia Petroleum Building	October 4, 1979 (#79002007)	722 N. Broadway St. 35°28′29″N 97°30′49″W	Oklahoma City	
90	Main Public Library	Main Public Library	December 13, 2010 (#10001009)	131 Dean McGee Ave. 35°28′16″N 97°30′58″W	Oklahoma City	First built 1901, remodeled 1954, downtown public library moved, 1954 building repurposed 2009
91	Main Street Arcade	Main Street Arcade	December 5, 2014 (#14001028)	629 W. Main; 35°28′04″N 97°31′26″W	Oklahoma City	
92	Maney Historic District	Maney Historic District	July 18, 1979 (#79002008)	725 NW. 11th St. and 1200 and 1224 N. Shartel Ave. 35°28′49″N 97°31′30″W	Oklahoma City	
93	The Mayfair	The Mayfair	September 12, 2012 (#12000786)	1315 N. Broadway Pl. 35°28′55″N 97°30′54″W	Oklahoma City	"Once home to some of Oklahoma City's wealthiest residents"
94	McClean House		November 30, 2020 (#100005863)	141 NE 26th St. 35°29′49″N 97°30′29″W	Oklahoma City	
95	Medical Arts Building	Medical Arts Building	December 13, 2016 (#16000849)	100 Park Ave. 35°28′07″N 97°30′53″W	Oklahoma City	
96	Merchants Transfer and Storage	Merchants Transfer and Storage	April 2, 1999 (#83004655)	19 E. California; 35°27′56″N 97°30′38″W	Oklahoma City	
97	Mesta Park	Mesta Park	July 26, 1983 (#83002102)	Roughly bounded by NW. 16th and 23rd Sts. and Western and Walker Aves. 35°29′21″N 97°31′25″W	Oklahoma City	
98	Mid-Continent Life Building	Mid-Continent Life Building	March 12, 1979 (#79002009)	1400 Classen Dr. 35°29′00″N 97°31′33″W	Oklahoma City	
99	Mideke Supply Building	Mideke Supply Building	August 12, 1983 (#83002103)	100 E. Main St. 35°28′02″N 97°30′35″W	Oklahoma City	
100	Milk Bottle Grocery	Milk Bottle Grocery	March 5, 1998 (#98000199)	2426 N. Classen Boulevard; 35°29′39″N 97°31′55″W	Oklahoma City	
101	Miller-Jackson Building	Miller-Jackson Building	August 12, 1983 (#83002104)	121 E. California Ave. 35°27′56″N 97°30′34″W	Oklahoma City	
102	Miller's Boulevard Historic District	Miller's Boulevard Historic District	December 4, 2014 (#14001029)	Bounded by NW. 16th St., W. Park Place, N. May & N. Villa Aves. 35°28′54″N 97°33′41″W	Oklahoma City	
103	Municipal Auditorium	Municipal Auditorium	December 13, 2016 (#16000850)	201 North Walker Ave. 35°28′08″N 97°31′23″W	Oklahoma City	
104	Mutual Savings and Loan Association Building	Mutual Savings and Loan Association Building	September 12, 2016 (#16000621)	601–605 NW. 23rd St. 35°29′36″N 97°31′22″W	Oklahoma City	
105	Nagle Site		February 14, 1979 (#79002011)	Address Restricted	Spencer	
106	National Foundation (Life) Center		December 29, 2025 (#100012476)	3535-3555 NW 58th St. 35°31′51″N 97°34′52″W	Oklahoma City	
107	Norton-Johnson Buick Company	Norton-Johnson Buick Company	June 22, 1998 (#98000668)	117–125 NW. 13th St. 35°28′58″N 97°30′53″W	Oklahoma City	multistory Art Deco structure built in 1930
108	Oklahoma City Discovery Well	Oklahoma City Discovery Well	December 9, 1977 (#77001095)	SE. 57th St. and ITIO Boulevard; 35°24′29″N 97°27′40″W	Oklahoma City	
109	Oklahoma City Ford Motor Company Assembly Plant	Oklahoma City Ford Motor Company Assembly Plant	September 10, 2014 (#14000595)	900 W. Main Ave. 35°28′04″N 97°31′40″W	Oklahoma City	
110	Oklahoma City Municipal Building	Oklahoma City Municipal Building	June 5, 2007 (#07000521)	200 N. Walker Ave. 35°28′08″N 97°31′13″W	Oklahoma City	
111	Oklahoma City National Memorial	Oklahoma City National Memorial	October 9, 1997 (#01000278)	Bounded by NW. 6th St., N. Robinson Ave., NW. 4th St., and N. Harvey Ave. 35°28′22″N 97°31′02″W	Oklahoma City	
112	Oklahoma City Schools Administration Building	Oklahoma City Schools Administration Building	September 19, 2019 (#100004400)	400 N. Walnut Ave. 35°28′15″N 97°30′31″W	Oklahoma City	
113	Oklahoma City University	Oklahoma City University	December 19, 1978 (#78002247)	2501 N. Blackwelder Ave. 35°29′42″N 97°32′39″W	Oklahoma City	
114	Oklahoma County Courthouse	Oklahoma County Courthouse	March 5, 1992 (#92000126)	321 Park Ave. 35°28′08″N 97°31′14″W	Oklahoma City	
115	Oklahoma County Home for Girls		March 21, 1978 (#78002248)	6300 N. Western Ave. 35°32′09″N 97°31′43″W	Oklahoma City	Demolished to make way for Chesapeake Energy campus.
116	Oklahoma Gas and Electric Company Building	Oklahoma Gas and Electric Company Building	April 9, 1980 (#80003288)	321 N. Harvey Ave. 35°28′15″N 97°31′09″W	Oklahoma City	
117	Oklahoma Hardware Building	Oklahoma Hardware Building	August 12, 1983 (#83002105)	27 E. California Ave. 35°27′56″N 97°30′38″W	Oklahoma City	
118	Oklahoma Historical Society Building	Oklahoma Historical Society Building	February 21, 1990 (#90000124)	2100 Lincoln Boulevard; 35°29′24″N 97°30′07″W	Oklahoma City	
119	Oklahoma National Guard Armory	Oklahoma National Guard Armory	December 2, 2019 (#100004739)	200 NE 23rd St. 35°29′35″N 97°30′33″W	Oklahoma City	
120	Oklahoma Publishing Company Building	Oklahoma Publishing Company Building	September 18, 1978 (#78002249)	500 N. Broadway; 35°28′19″N 97°30′50″W	Oklahoma City	
121	Oklahoma State Capitol	Oklahoma State Capitol	October 8, 1976 (#76001572)	22nd St. and Lincoln Boulevard; 35°29′32″N 97°30′11″W	Oklahoma City	
122	Old North Tower, Central State College	Old North Tower, Central State College	June 21, 1971 (#71000671)	400 E. Hurd St. on the Central State College campus 35°39′21″N 97°28′25″W	Edmond	
123	Osler Building	Osler Building	June 15, 2012 (#12000347)	1200 N. Walker Ave. 35°28′49″N 97°31′15″W	Oklahoma City	
124	Overholser Mansion	Overholser Mansion	June 22, 1970 (#70000536)	405 15th St., NW. 35°29′06″N 97°30′45″W	Oklahoma City	
125	Pachyderm Building for the Lincoln Park Zoo		September 17, 2021 (#100006906)	2000 Remington Place (Oklahoma City Zoo and Botanical Garden); 35°31′16″N 97°28′21″W	Oklahoma City	
126	Paseo Neighborhood Historic District	Paseo Neighborhood Historic District	May 27, 2004 (#04000517)	Roughly by NW. 30th St., North Western Ave., NW. 24th St., and N. Walker Ave. 35°29′58″N 97°31′31″W	Oklahoma City	
127	Pilgrim Congregational Church	Pilgrim Congregational Church	February 23, 1984 (#84003389)	1433 Classen Dr. 35°28′58″N 97°31′36″W	Oklahoma City	now City Presbyterian Church
128	Pioneer Building	Pioneer Building	March 3, 1980 (#80003289)	401 N. Broadway St. 35°28′16″N 97°30′51″W	Oklahoma City	built 1909; first downtown high-rise and fireproof building in Oklahoma City
129	Pioneer Telephone Company Warehouse and Garage	Pioneer Telephone Company Warehouse and Garage	June 7, 2018 (#100002545)	1–13 NE. 6th St. 35°28′27″N 97°30′36″W	Oklahoma City	
130	Plaza Court	Plaza Court	September 8, 1980 (#80003290)	1100 Classen Dr. 35°28′46″N 97°31′16″W	Oklahoma City	
131	Point 8 Site		September 6, 1978 (#78002250)	Address Restricted	Oklahoma City	
132	Donald Pollock House	Donald Pollock House	December 13, 2001 (#01001356)	2400 NW. 59th St. 35°32′07″N 97°33′13″W	Oklahoma City	
133	Post Office, Courthouse, and Federal Office Building	Post Office, Courthouse, and Federal Office Building	August 30, 1974 (#74001665)	Robinson at 3rd St. 35°28′16″N 97°31′01″W	Oklahoma City	
134	Putnam Heights Historic Preservation District	Putnam Heights Historic Preservation District	June 2, 1982 (#82003693)	Georgia and McKinley Boulevards and 35th, 37th, and 38th Sts. 35°30′28″N 97°32′12″W	Oklahoma City	
135	Quillin Site		February 14, 1979 (#79002005)	Address Restricted	Midwest City	
136	Edward Richardson Building	Edward Richardson Building	December 4, 2017 (#100001870)	101 Main St. 35°39′45″N 97°19′31″W	Arcadia	
137	Rock House		March 6, 2025 (#100011142)	20000 NE 23rd Street; 35°29′34″N 97°10′35″W	Harrah	
138	Rock Island Plow Building	Rock Island Plow Building	August 12, 1983 (#83002106)	29 E. Reno Ave. 35°27′52″N 97°30′38″W	Oklahoma City	
139	St. Ann's Home for the Aged		December 12, 2022 (#100008453)	3825 NW 19th St. 35°29′22″N 97°35′12″W	Oklahoma City	
140	St. Joseph's Cathedral	St. Joseph's Cathedral	January 30, 1978 (#78002253)	225 4th St., NW. 35°28′20″N 97°31′05″W	Oklahoma City	
141	St. Paul's Cathedral	St. Paul's Cathedral	April 11, 1977 (#77001096)	127 7th St., NW. 35°28′31″N 97°30′56″W	Oklahoma City	
142	Santa Fe Depot	Santa Fe Depot	December 8, 2015 (#15000874)	146 S. E.K. Gaylord Blvd. 35°27′54″N 97°30′46″W	Oklahoma City	
143	Shepherd Historic District	Shepherd Historic District	June 20, 1997 (#97000612)	Roughly bounded by NW. 30th and NW. 25th Sts., N. Pennsylvania Ave., and N. Youngs Boulevard; 35°29′55″N 97°33′05″W	Oklahoma City	
144	Sherman Machine and Iron Works Building	Sherman Machine and Iron Works Building	August 12, 1983 (#83002107)	26 E. Main St. 35°28′03″N 97°30′38″W	Oklahoma City	
145	Sieber Grocery and Apartment Hotel	Sieber Grocery and Apartment Hotel	September 7, 2005 (#05001001)	1305–1313 N. Hudson Ave. 35°29′01″N 97°30′58″W	Oklahoma City	
146	John Sinopoulo House		November 28, 1978 (#78002251)	4000 N. Kelley; 35°30′41″N 97°29′34″W	Oklahoma City	
147	Skirvin Hotel	Skirvin Hotel	October 10, 1979 (#79002010)	1 Park Ave. 35°28′08″N 97°30′49″W	Oklahoma City	
148	Dr. W.H. Slaughter House	Dr. W.H. Slaughter House	December 20, 2018 (#100003237)	3101 NE 50th St. 35°31′23″N 97°27′23″W	Oklahoma City	
149	Smith and Kernke Funeral Directors	Smith and Kernke Funeral Directors	June 3, 1999 (#99000671)	1401 NW. 23rd St. 35°29′37″N 97°32′05″W	Oklahoma City	
150	Spanish Village Historic District	Spanish Village Historic District	February 24, 1983 (#83002108)	2909–3024 Paseo; 35°29′57″N 97°31′19″W	Oklahoma City	
151	Spencer No. 2 Site		November 27, 1978 (#78002252)	Address Restricted	Oklahoma City	
152	Stanford Furniture Co. Building	Stanford Furniture Co. Building	August 12, 1983 (#83002109)	1 E. Sheridan Ave. 35°28′00″N 97°30′41″W	Oklahoma City	
153	State Highway Department Testing Laboratory	State Highway Department Testing Laboratory	December 2, 2019 (#100004740)	2311 North Central Ave. 35°29′34″N 97°30′26″W	Oklahoma City	
154	Stockyards City Historic District	Stockyards City Historic District	August 24, 1979 (#79003643)	An irregular pattern along Agnew and Exchange Aves. 35°27′11″N 97°33′22″W	Oklahoma City	
155	Stonegate Elementary School	Stonegate Elementary School	July 15, 2019 (#100004179)	2525 NW 112th St. 35°35′01″N 97°33′36″W	Oklahoma City	
156	Sunshine Cleaners	Sunshine Cleaners	June 14, 2016 (#16000374)	1002 NW. 1st St. 35°28′07″N 97°31′45″W	Oklahoma City	
157	Taft Junior High School	Taft Junior High School	June 5, 2007 (#07000515)	2901 NW. 23rd. St. 35°29′38″N 97°33′58″W	Oklahoma City	
158	The "Y" Chapel of Song	The "Y" Chapel of Song	June 14, 2001 (#01000657)	100 N. University; on the campus of the University of Central Oklahoma; 35°39′19″N 97°28′23″W	Edmond	
159	Threatt Filling Station	Threatt Filling Station	February 23, 1995 (#95000038)	Southwestern corner of the former U.S. Route 66 and Pottawatomi Rd. 35°39′59″N 97°08′28″W	Luther	
160	Tiffany House	Tiffany House	June 13, 2016 (#16000375)	5505 N. Brookline Ave. 35°31′34″N 97°34′05″W	Oklahoma City	
161	Town House Hotel	Town House Hotel	December 10, 2014 (#14001031)	627 Northwest 5th St. 35°28′24″N 97°31′27″W	Oklahoma City	
162	Tradesman's National Bank Building	Tradesman's National Bank Building	November 5, 1980 (#80003292)	101 N. Broadway St. 35°28′04″N 97°30′52″W	Oklahoma City	
163	Trinity United Presbyterian Church	Trinity United Presbyterian Church	September 20, 2019 (#100004401)	2301 NE 23rd St. 35°29′35″N 97°28′14″W	Oklahoma City	
164	Tuton's Drugstore	Tuton's Drugstore	March 3, 1980 (#80003278)	1st and Main Sts. 35°39′47″N 97°19′30″W	Arcadia	
165	Union Depot	Union Depot	May 16, 1978 (#78002254)	300 7th St., NW. 35°27′26″N 97°31′06″W	Oklahoma City	
166	United Founders Life Tower	United Founders Life Tower	March 13, 2013 (#13000076)	5900 Mosteller Dr. 35°31′53″N 97°34′17″W	Oklahoma City	
167	Villa Teresa Historic District		September 17, 2020 (#100005559)	1212, 1216, 1228, and 1300 Classen Dr. 35°28′49″N 97°31′23″W	Oklahoma City	
168	Walcourt Building	Walcourt Building	March 19, 1982 (#82003694)	1401 Walnut Ave., NE. 35°28′58″N 97°30′32″W	Oklahoma City	
169	Weather Service Building	Weather Service Building	July 12, 1978 (#78002255)	1923 Classen Boulevard; 35°29′24″N 97°31′53″W	Oklahoma City	
170	Wells Fargo and Company Livery Stable	Wells Fargo and Company Livery Stable	July 9, 1982 (#82003695)	115 E. Reno Ave. 35°27′52″N 97°30′34″W	Oklahoma City	
171	Wesley Hospital	Wesley Hospital	September 9, 2013 (#13000706)	300 NW 12th St. 35°28′53″N 97°31′05″W	Oklahoma City	
172	Whittier School		June 9, 2021 (#100006629)	1900 NW 10th St. 35°28′43″N 97°32′37″W	Oklahoma City	
173	Will Rogers Park Gardens and Arboretum	Will Rogers Park Gardens and Arboretum	September 7, 2005 (#05001000)	3400–3500 NW. 36th St. 35°30′30″N 97°34′46″W	Oklahoma City	

== Former listings ==
	Name on the Register	Image	Date listed	Date removed	Location	City or town	Description
1	Goodholm House	Goodholm House	March 30, 1983 (#83002099)	June 26, 2023	3101 West Gen. Pershing Blvd. 35°28′29″N 97°34′11″W	Oklahoma City	Relocated from State Fair Park in 2008 in Oklahoma City
2	Montgomery Ward Building		March 13, 1980 (#80003287)	March 8, 2005	500 W. Main St. 35°28′03″N 97°31′18″W	Oklahoma City	Delisted due to significant alterations.
3	Snyder's Super Service Station		March 26, 1980 (#80003291)	January 25, 2001	1325 N. Broadway Ave. 35°28′55″N 97°30′50″W	Oklahoma City	Delisted due to destruction of building's Spanish Tower, which qualified the building for listing to begin with.

== See also ==
- List of National Historic Landmarks in Oklahoma
- National Register of Historic Places listings in Oklahoma
