= Pioneer Building =

Pioneer Building may refer to:

- Pioneer Building (San Francisco), listed on the NRHP in San Francisco, California
- Pioneer Building of the Pioneer and Endicott Buildings, Saint Paul, Minnesota, listed on the NRHP in Minnesota
- Montana Veterans and Pioneers Memorial Building, Helena, Montana, listed on the NRHP in Lewis and Clark County, Montana
- Pioneer Building (New Rochelle, New York), listed on the NRHP in Westchester County, New York
- Pioneer Building (Oklahoma City), listed on the NRHP in Oklahoma County, Oklahoma
- Pioneer Building (Seattle, Washington), listed on the NRHP in Washington
- Pioneer Building (Milwaukee)
- Pioneer Block, Eau Claire, Wisconsin, listed on the NRHP in Eau Claire County, Wisconsin

== See also ==
- Pioneer Hall (disambiguation)
- Pioneer Mine Buildings and A Headframe, Ely, Minnesota, listed on the NRHP in St. Louis County, Minnesota
- Pioneer Theater-Auditorium, Reno, Nevada, listed on the NRHP in Washoe County, Nevada
- Ghirardelli Square, which includes Pioneer Woolen Mills and D. Ghirardelli Company, San Francisco CA, listed on the NRHP in San Francisco, California
