= Jefferson Park Historic District =

Jefferson Park Historic District can refer to: (sorted by state, then city/town)

- Jefferson Park Historic District (Tucson, Arizona), listed on the National Register of Historic Places (NRHP) in Pima County
- Jefferson Park Historic District (Oklahoma City, Oklahoma), listed on the NRHP in Oklahoma County
