= Pioneer House =

Pioneer House or Pioneer Cabin or Pioneer Farm may refer to:

== Television ==
- Colonial House (TV series), a TV series also known as Pioneer House

== Places ==
- Sitka Pioneers' Home, Sitka, AK, listed on the NRHP in Alaska
- Pioneer House (Clarksville, Arkansas), listed on the NRHP in Arkansas
- Pioneer Sod House, Wheat Ridge, CO, listed on the NRHP in Colorado
- Pioneer Cabin (Colorado Springs, Colorado), listed on the NRHP in Colorado
- Pioneer Log Cabin, Bowling Green, KY, listed on the NRHP in Kentucky
- Pioneer Farm (Dansville, New York), listed on the NRHP in New York
- Saint's Rest, Tukey's Pioneer Cabin and Homestead House, Port Townsend, WA, listed on the NRHP in Washington

== Other ==
- Pioneer Cabin Tree, a giant sequoia that stood in Calaveras Big Trees State Park

== See also ==
- Pioneer Hall (disambiguation)
