= Threatt =

Threatt is a surname. Notable people with the surname include:

- Elizabeth Threatt (1926–1993), American model and actress
- Frank H. Threatt (died 1931), American Methodist minister, politician, and public office holder
- Jay Threatt (born 1989), American basketball player
- Sedale Threatt (born 1961), American basketball player

== See also ==
- Threatt Filling Station
