= Citizens State Bank (Edmond, Oklahoma) =

Historic building in the United States

- U.S. National Register of Historic Places
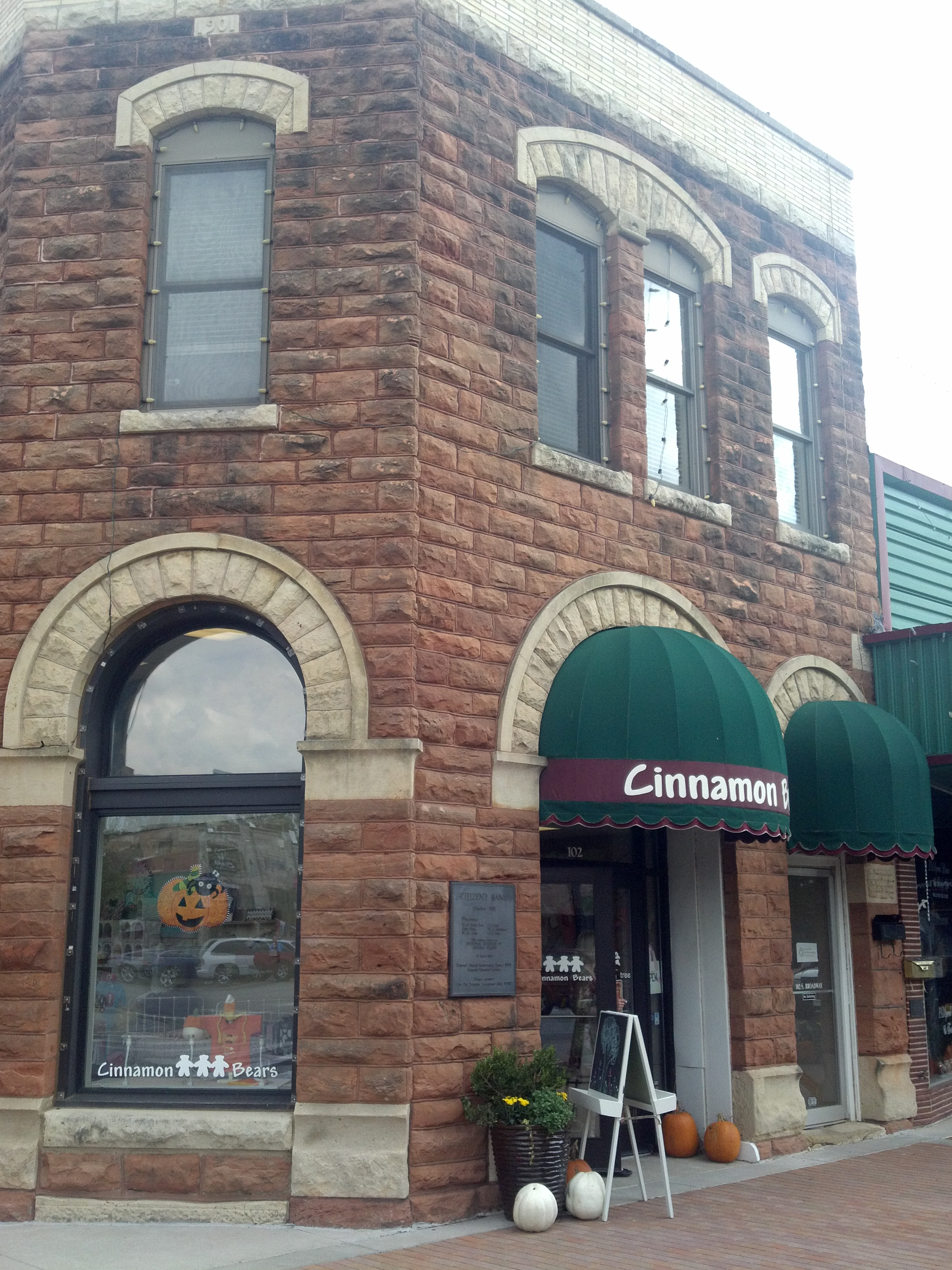

- Location within Oklahoma
- Location: 102 South Broadway, Edmond, Oklahoma, U.S.
- Coordinates: 35°39′14″N 97°28′51″W
- Area: 1 acre (0.40 ha)
- Built: 1901
- NRHP reference No.: 80003279
- Added to NRHP: March 13, 1980

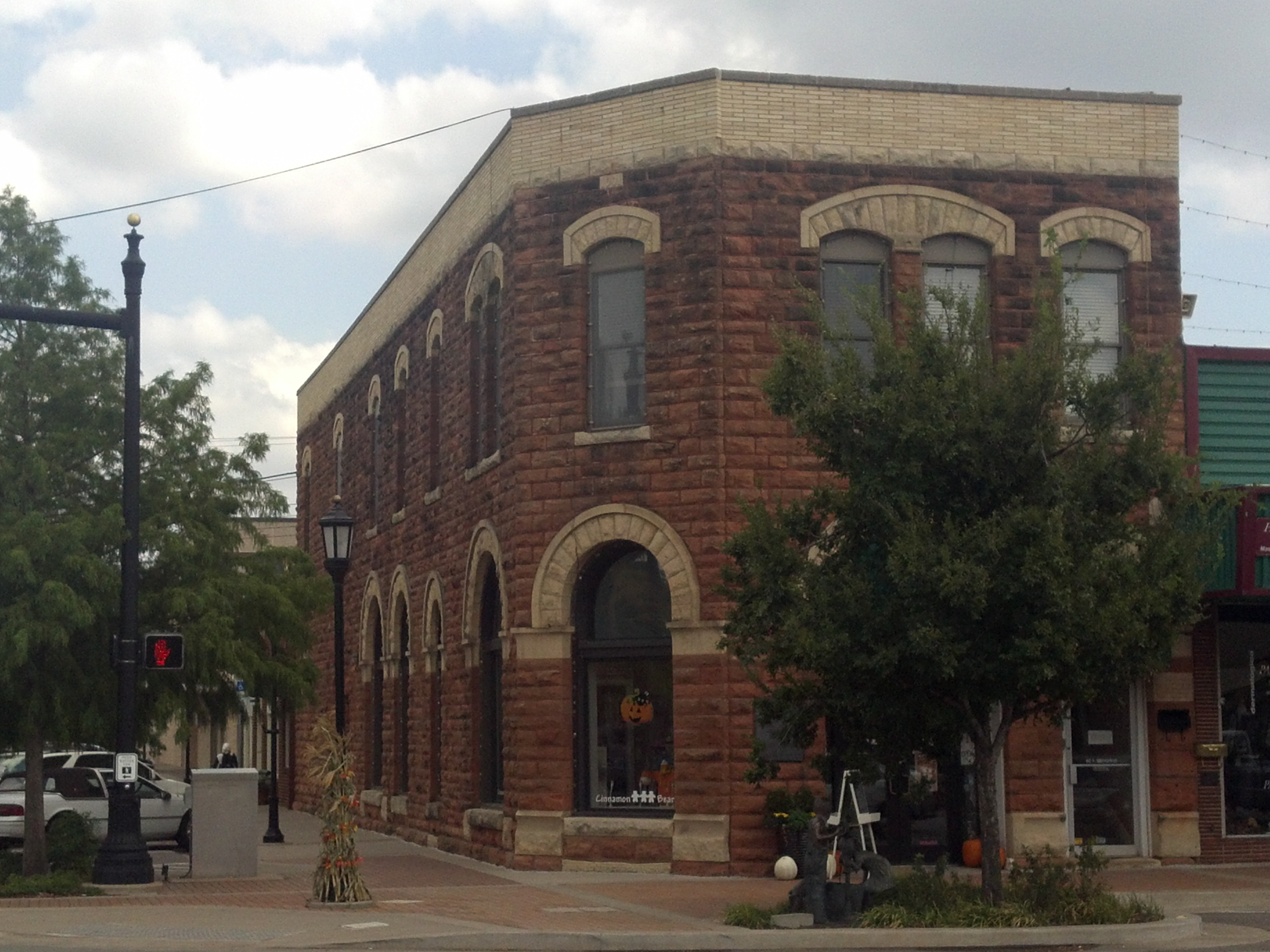
Citizens State Bank in 2012

Citizens State Bank is a historic building in downtown Edmond, Oklahoma. The bank was founded April 18, 1901, and is still operating. The building now houses a home furnishings store. It is listed on the National Register of Historic Places since March 13, 1980.

== History ==
The two-story red sandstone building is at 102 South Broadway, and was originally called Citizens Bank. The stone was quarried nearby. The building is considered a well preserved example of territorial sandstone architecture, and serves as a reminder of the importance of early banking.

W. H. Tuttle its first president of the bank, followed by co-founder W. J. Huffman in 1907, and Edwin A. Bender in 1914. G. H. Fink was president in the 1920s. The bank moved into a building across the street to 1 East 1st Street in 1914. In 1981, the bank was renamed Citizens' Bank of Edmond. In 2006 the bank had six branches, with a seventh planned.

== See also ==
- National Register of Historic Places listings in Oklahoma County, Oklahoma
