= First Christian Church (Walker Avenue, Oklahoma City) =

Historic church in Oklahoma, United States

- First Christian Church Historic District
- U.S. National Register of Historic Places
- U.S. Historic district
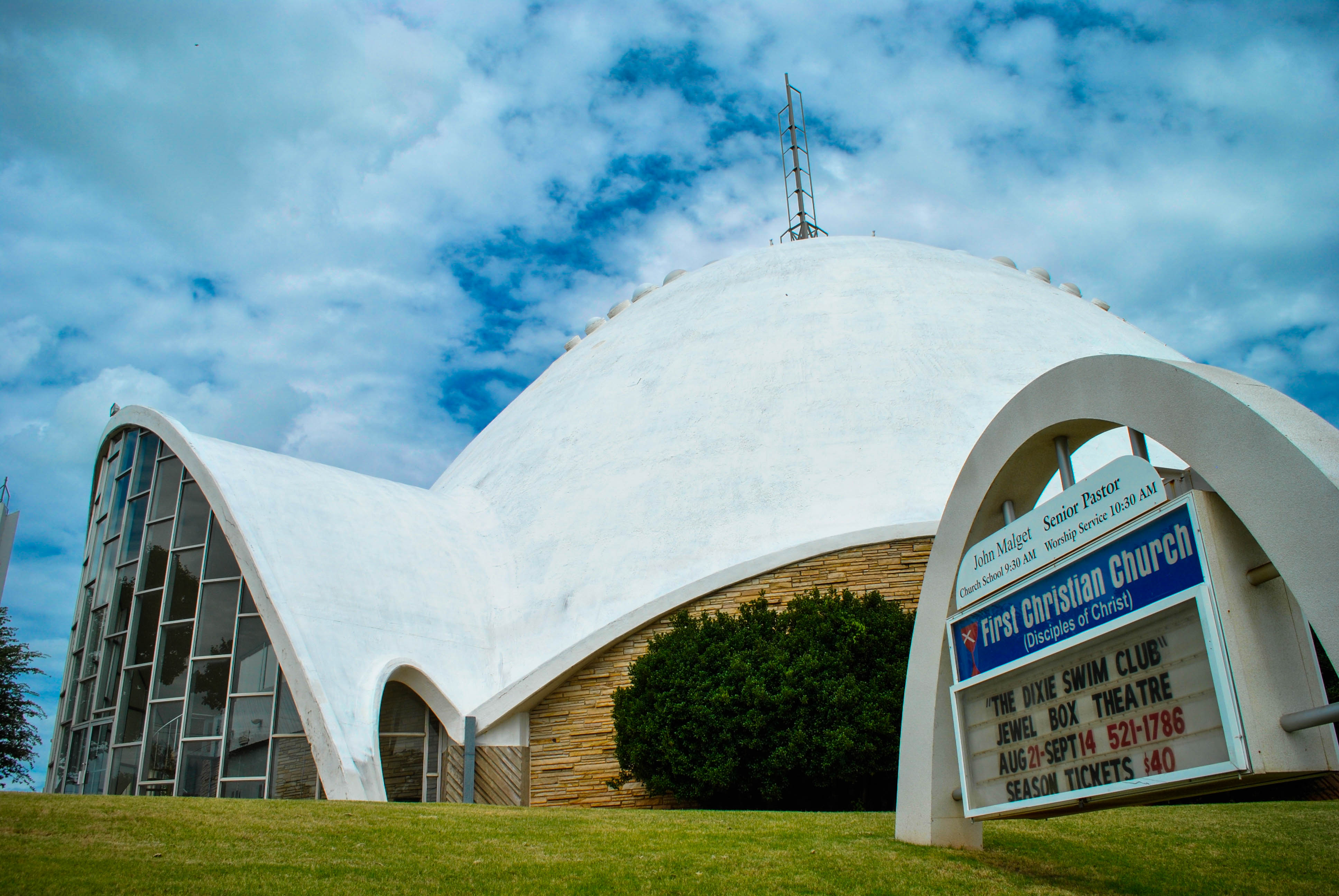

- Location within Oklahoma Location within the United States
- Location: 3700 N Walker Ave, Oklahoma City, Oklahoma
- Coordinates: 35.5092°N 97.5183°W
- Area: 32 acres (13 ha)
- Built: 1947
- Architects: Conner, R. Duane and Pojesmy, Fred; Fearnow, William
- Architectural style: Modern Movement
- NRHP reference No.: 11000081
- Added to NRHP: March 14, 2011

The First Christian Church (also known as the Church of Tomorrow) was a modernist church building at 3700 N Walker Avenue in Oklahoma City, Oklahoma, United States. Designed by local architects Conner & Pojezny, it was built in 1956 for the congregation of the First Christian Church. The main building on the campus had a domed sanctuary that was dubbed the "egg church" for its shape, along with education and theater wings attached to it. Also on the site were a tower, an amphitheater, the Youth Center, and the Oklahoma Disciples Center. The site is on the National Register of Historic Places.

The First Christian Church site was acquired in 1946, and an amphitheater opened the same year. The main building was constructed from 1953 to 1956, followed by two others through the mid-1960s. The complex was placed for sale in 2016 because the congregation could not afford the maintenance costs. Amid preservationists' efforts to save the church buildings, the campus was demolished in 2022.

== Description ==
The First Christian Church was located in Oklahoma City, Oklahoma, United States. It was part of a campus covering 40 acres (16 ha) or 43 acres (17 ha), of which 32 acres (13 ha) is designated on the National Register of Historic Places as part of a historic district, the First Christian Church Historic District. Located near Interstate 235, the site consists of rolling hills at the northeastern corner of N Walker Avenue to the west and NW 36th Street to the south. A stream runs through the northern boundary of the site, and the residential Edgemere and Crown Heights subdivision surround the former church site. Two drop-off areas and multiple parking lots, connected by a private street between Walker Avenue and NW 36th Street, served the complex. In total, the complex covered over 66,000 square feet (6,100 m^{2}).

Four structures were spread across the grounds, along with an amphitheater. These included the original church building, designed by R. Duane Conner and Fred Pojezny of the firm Conner & Pojezny. Additional structures were designed by Pojezny with William Fearnow, the latter of whom joined Conner & Pojezny after Conner split to form his own firm. When it was being built in the 1950s, the First Christian Church's unconventional design was covered in media across the US, including Architectural Record, Newsweek, and Life magazines. After its completion, the church's design was popular among architecture fans. Conner's granddaughter later said that "William Alexander, the minister, was ahead of his time by decades."

=== Main building ===
The main church was composed of three sections: a sanctuary, educational wing, and theater. The sanctuary was the largest section of the church. The lowest portion was clad with stones that were laid horizontally, and the southwest corner had a concrete parabolic arch with a glass-walled entrance. The roof was a thin concrete-shell dome, which measured about 110 feet (34 m) tall. The roof had skylights laid in an "X" pattern, along with an aluminum spire. A vestibule from the southwest entrance contained a spiral staircase to the audio booth. There were ground-floor office space and a small chapel. An escalator led to a sanctuary on the second floor, described in The Christian Science Monitor as the first in an American church. The sanctuary had a mechanically movable pulpit and spanned 16,562 square feet (1,539 m^{2}), providing space for 2,000 occupants. Due to the sanctuary's unusual shape, it was dubbed the "egg church".

The education building was a four-story circular building. It measured 100 feet (30 m) across, with a flat roof; the third and fourth floors were clad in louvers with triangular motifs. It had a flat-roofed porte-cochere on the east and a fire escape outside the northern elevation. Inside, the main floor contained a kitchen and a large open space, the latter of which could fit 500 or 550 people. The upper three floors had wedge-shaped rooms, including 50 classrooms, restrooms, kitchenettes, and control building. A one-story wing with a flat roof connected the education building and a circular theater, also known as the Jewel Box Theater. The facade had a concrete water table and concrete walls with multicolored panels. The interior had a theatre-in-the-round layout (with seats surrounding a stage) and backstage space to the west. All three sections of the main building had breezeways.

=== Other buildings ===
Two other modern-styled buildings—the Youth Center and the Oklahoma Disciples Center, both by Pojezny and Fearnow—occupied the campus; both buildings had aluminum-framed windows on their facades. The Youth Center had a central section with a gable roof, which was used for offices, flanked by flat-roofed classroom areas to the north and south, and a gymnasium in the east (rear). The front (west) facade of the Youth Center, which surrounded a circular courtyard, was concave and had an overhanging roof. The other building was the Oklahoma Disciples Center, which had a 1 1/2-story atrium with a thin-shell roof, inside which was a main lobby and conference room. The lobby was flanked by flat-roofed office wings measuring one story high.

Also on the grounds is a 130-foot (40 m) bell tower. Located at the site's northeast corner, the bell tower has buttresses at its base, a circular upper section, and an aluminum spire, along with ladder and a gas pipe inside. South of the bell tower was a reflecting pool, later converted into a playground. There was also a fountain (later converted into a planter with a stone wall) at the corner of Walker Avenue and NW 36th Street, and an arched metal sign on NW 36th Street with an electronic board. There was also a 3,500-seat amphitheater, whose design predated the rest of the church. The amphitheater had an elevated stage at the north end, as well as two concession stands at its southern end.

== History ==
=== Development ===
The church's main building seen from its former fountain on Walker Avenue, looking toward NW 36th Street

The First Christian Church congregation was founded within a week of the Land Rush that launched Oklahoma City's development on April 22, 1889; it was the first congregation in the city to conduct a baptismal service. For several decades, the congregation had worshipped at the First Christian Church building at N Robinson Avenue and NW 10th Street in Downtown Oklahoma City. In May 1946, the Oklahoma School Land Commission decided to split up and subdivide the 103-acre (42 ha) Edgemere Golf Course in northern Oklahoma City. Among the buyers of the golf course's land was the First Christian Church, which hoped to build a new campus there. The congregation's pastor, William Bill Alexander, wanted a futuristic-looking church and convinced other members of the congregation that the land could host various facilities, such as an amphitheater, theater, sanctuary, and education wing. He also planned a youth center and chapel attached to the sanctuary, detailing his plans for the area to local developers that September.

The First Christian Church tract covered approximately 40 acres (16 ha) and, within a short time of the church's acquisition, was being used for physical activities. In August 1947, the church dedicated the tract's amphitheater with a celebration, which attracted over three thousand people. Concurrently, Alexander hired R. Duane Conner and Fred Pojezny to devise a design for the new church; both men had been his congregants. Conner initially designed an International Style structure and a pyramidal church before he decided on a domed church. The plans were officially announced to the public on December 25, 1953, and groundbreaking ceremonies occurred two days later. At the time, the cost was estimated at $1.25 million.

The under-construction church attracted crowds of up to a thousand people a day. During the construction, Alexander claimed that "many visitors come to scoff but remain to praise". Detractors claimed the domed design would be unsafe, but Conner persisted; the first person to endorse his design was a technical director attending a concrete conference at Oklahoma A&M. Meanwhile, low temperatures, material shortage, patches of damp concrete, and painters' strikes all delayed construction. Six hundred artisans worked on the project, which was completed in late December 1956; it was dedicated on December 23 before a crowd of 3,000.

=== Usage and demolition ===
The church had its first sermons in January 1957 and also hosted events such as First Annual Dinners. The church building hosted various programs and groups during its half-century existence. In conjunction with the church's construction, Alexander proposed setting up services that were uncommon in other churches of the time, such as an employment service and "Christian psychiatric help". Alexander ultimately died in a plane crash in 1960, three years after the church opened. The congregation was led by Bill's son Don Alexander and was a Disciples of Christ congregation by the late 1970s. Following the 1995 Oklahoma City bombing, the church functioned as an emergency shelter and provided information about missing people. By the late 2000s, an 18-acre (7.3 ha) parcel in the eastern section of the church site had been sold, prompting fears that the mostly-residential neighborhood might be redeveloped. The First Christian Church complex's Youth Center was leased to Trinity School in 2009. The school had moved out by 2018–2019, when the building was renovated for use by the Jewel Box theater company.

In 2016, the church's 32-acre (13 ha) campus was placed for sale at $8.2 million; the shrinking congregation could not pay the rising maintenance costs. The congregation was unable to find a buyer for several years, in part due to the presence of asbestos in the existing building. The sale attracted greater notice in 2018, when the asking price was reduced to $5.65 million. In 2019, preservationists began a campaign to have the building designated as a city landmark. The Oklahoma City Council contemplated overlaying another historic-district designation over the existing NRHP designation, but the congregation opposed the move, saying it could create issues for a buyer. That May, Crossings Community Church signed a contract to buy and preserve the First Christian Church campus, in exchange for the City Council withdrawing the historic district overlay. Crossings Church reneged from its agreement to buy the buildings in August 2019, citing the high costs of maintaining the property. The Oklahoma City Council did not reconsider the church for landmark status, and as such, temporary injunctions preventing the church's demolition were left to expire.

An application to demolish the church was submitted on September 23, 2022. The church was suddenly demolished three days later on September 26, to the surprise of preservationists and residents. The group Preservation Oklahoma claimed that, up until a few weeks before the demolition took place, there had been several offers for the property. Some portions of the site, such as the bell tower, a statue of Alexander, and Jewel Box Theater, were left intact, and the Jewel Box theater company continued performing shows in the theater, albeit as an independent entity. Colony Developers Inc. negotiated to acquire the site in 2023 and later proposed 129 homes and a park there. Subsequently, the First Christian Church property was redeveloped as Lexford Park, a residential subdivision, and the congregation moved to the Plaza District in 2026.

== See also ==
- National Register of Historic Places listings in Oklahoma County, Oklahoma
