= Gower Cemetery =

Historic African American cemetery in Edmond, Oklahoma

- U.S. National Register of Historic Places
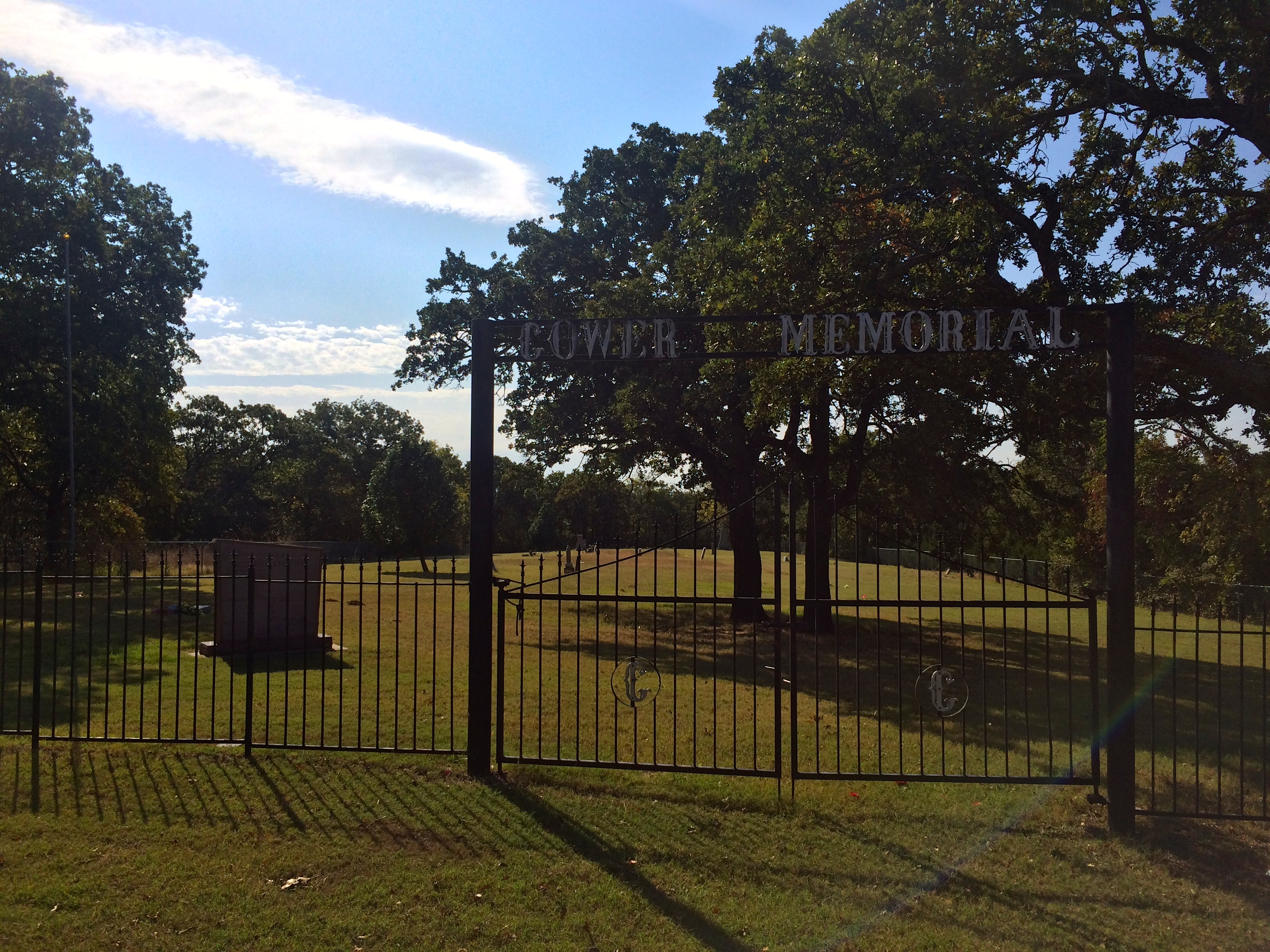

- Location within Oklahoma Location within the United States
- Location: 9033 East Covel Road, Edmond, Oklahoma
- Coordinates: 35°40′53″N 97°21′37″W
- Area: 1 acre (0.40 ha)
- Built: 1889
- NRHP reference No.: 91001895
- Added to NRHP: December 27, 1991

Gower Cemetery is a historic African American cemetery in Edmond, Oklahoma. It was established in 1889 by a formerly enslaved couple named Ophelia and John Gower who allowed other families of color and indigent people to bury their dead on their land for free.

== History ==
The burial ground was recognized by the State of Oklahoma in 1907. The Gowers' granddaughter worked to have the site added to the National Register of Historic Places in 1991 as the sole surviving proof of a former black homesteading community in that location. It is estimated that 200 individuals are interred at the site which is located east of Interstate 35 on Covel Road between Douglas and Post Roads.

== See also ==
- List of cemeteries in Oklahoma
- National Register of Historic Places listings in Oklahoma County, Oklahoma
