= St. Paul Baptist Church and Cemetery =

Historic site in Lincoln County, Oklahoma, US

- U.S. National Register of Historic Places
- U.S. Historic district
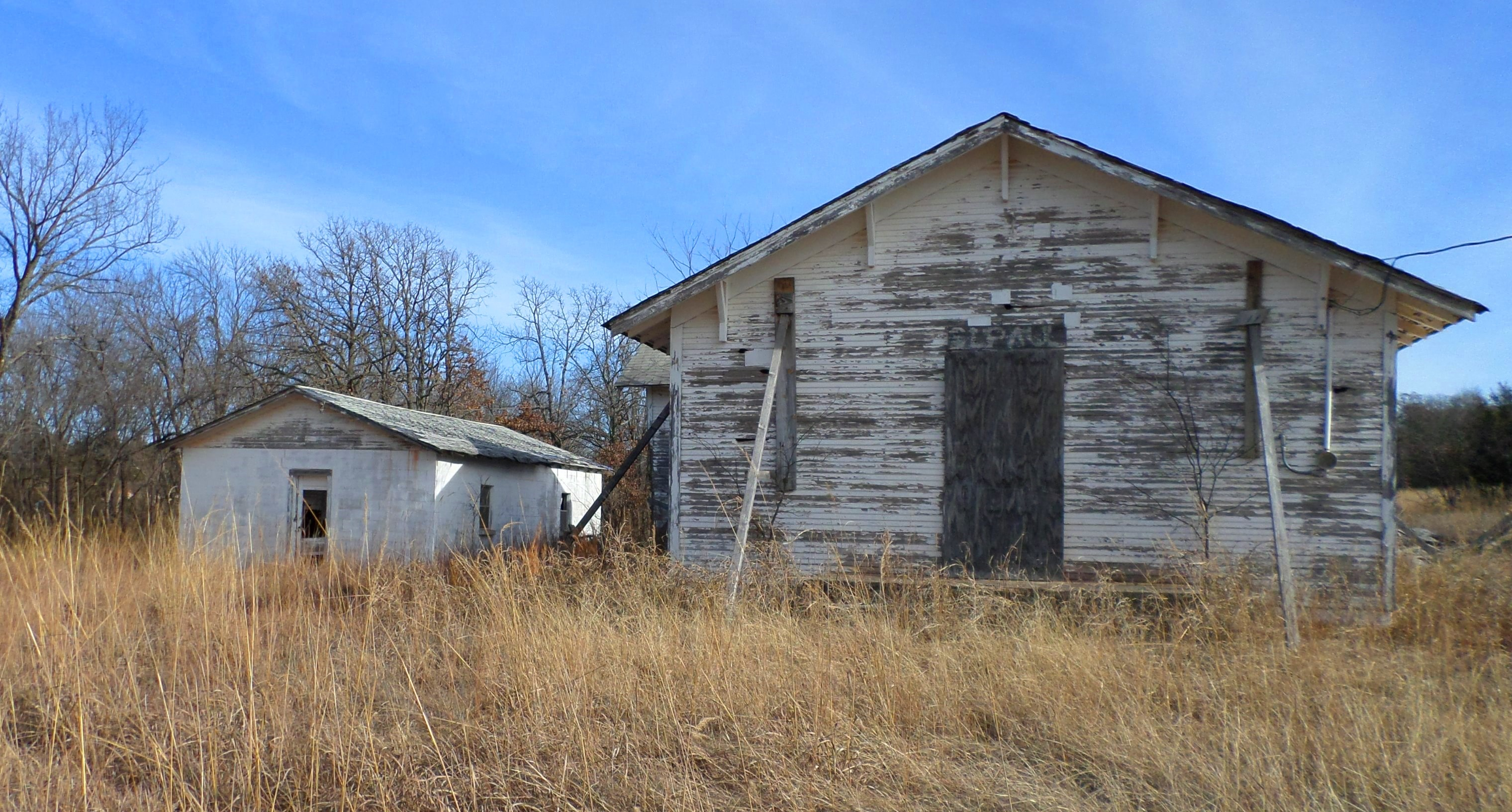
- St. Paul Baptist Church

- Location within Oklahoma Location within the United States
- Nearest city: Meeker, Oklahoma
- Coordinates: 35.5647°N 96.9103°W
- Area: 1.9 acres (0.77 ha)
- Built: 1940
- NRHP reference No.: 02000973
- Added to NRHP: September 13, 2002

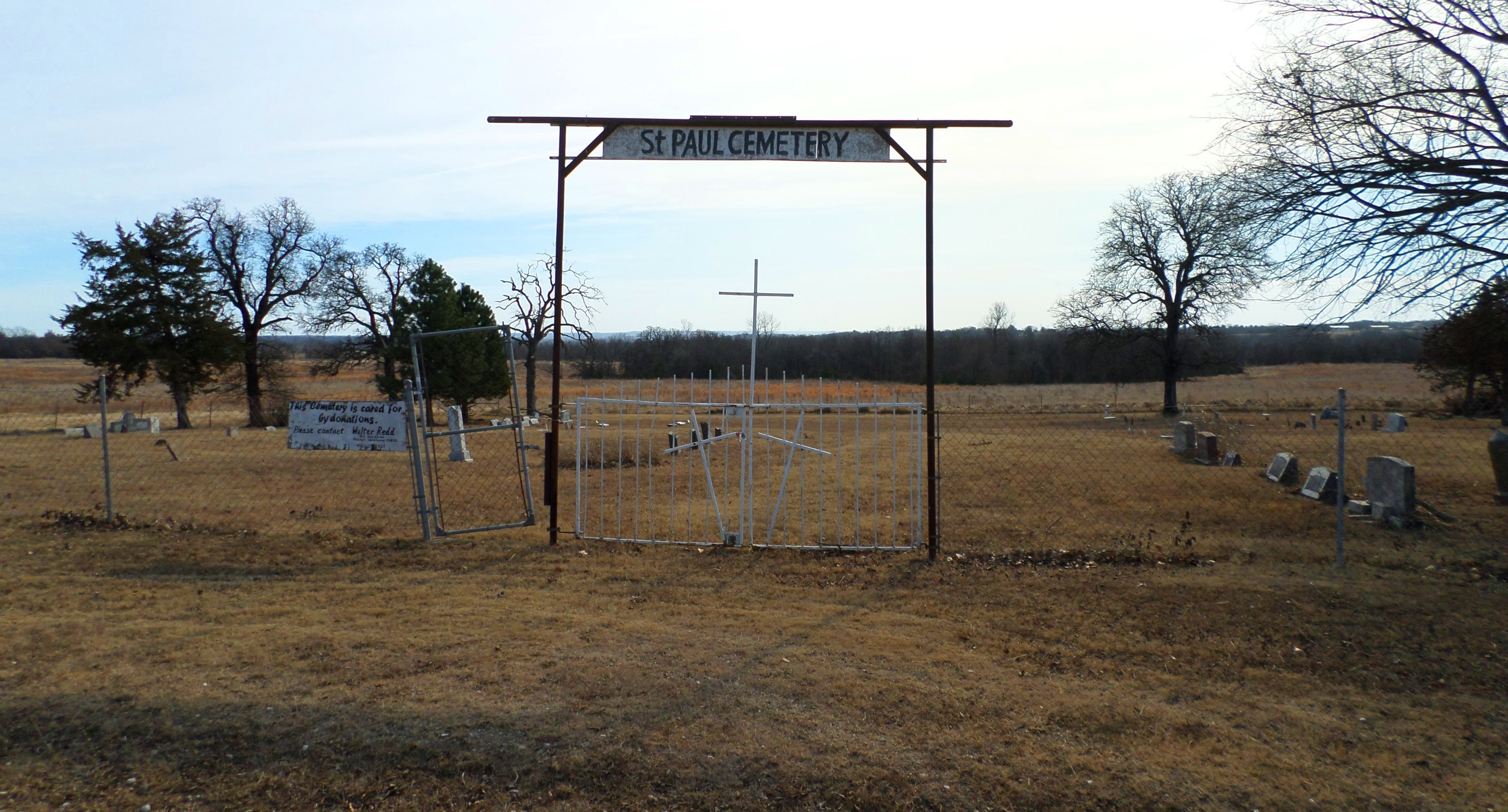
St. Paul Cemetery

St. Paul Baptist Church and Cemetery is a historic African-American church and cemetery near Meeker, Oklahoma, United States and is the only known site in Lincoln County, Oklahoma. The church is located along N3420 Road, and the cemetery is located three-quarters of a mile east of the church complex. The church was built in 1940 after a fire destroyed the original church in 1939.

It was added to the National Register of Historic Places in 2002.

== See also ==
- List of cemeteries in Oklahoma
