= Old North Tower, University of Central Oklahoma =

Building in Edmond, Oklahoma, US

- Old North Tower
- U.S. National Register of Historic Places
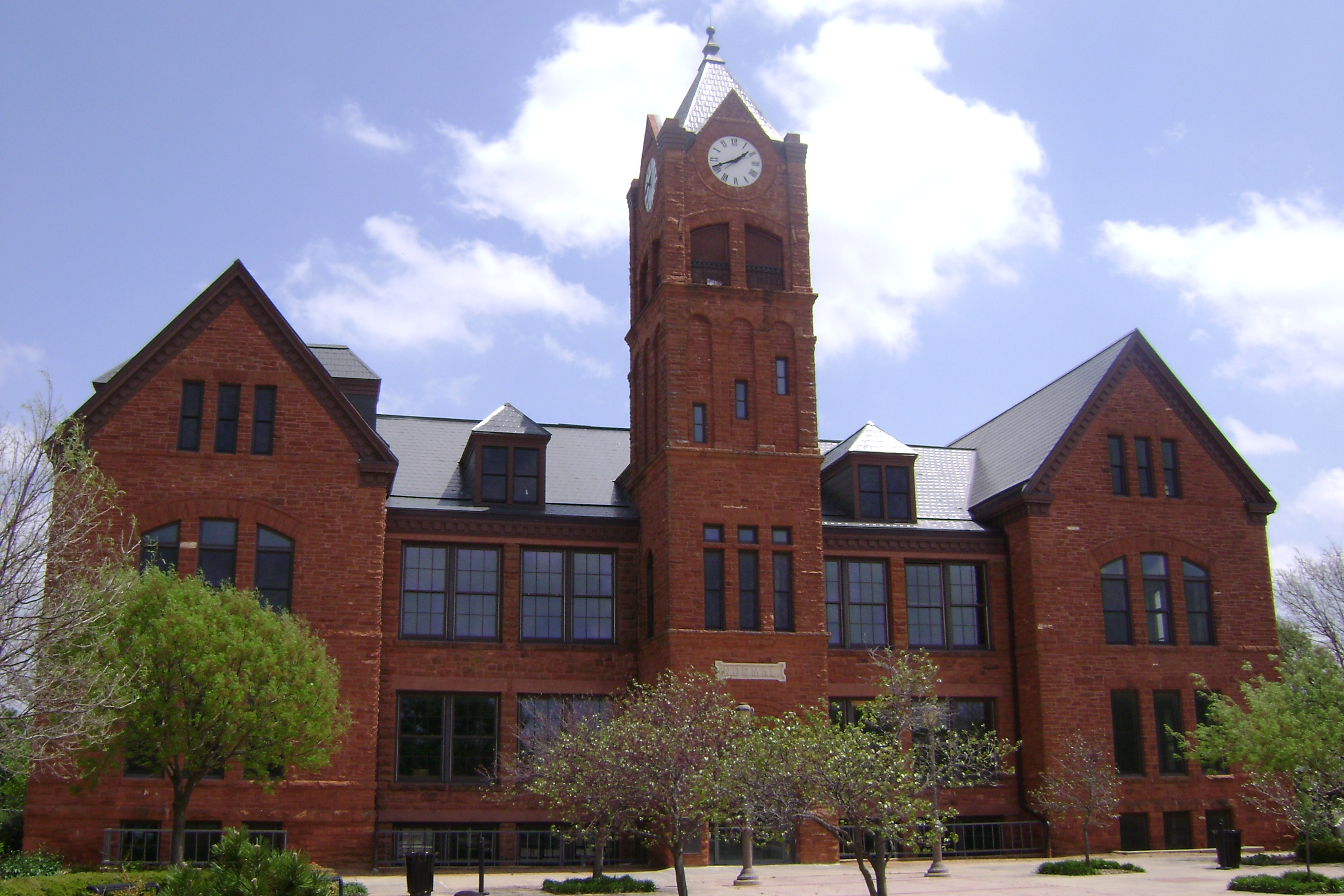
- University of Central Oklahoma's Old North

- Location within Oklahoma Location within the United States
- Location: University of Central Oklahoma campus, Edmond, Oklahoma
- Nearest city: Edmond, Oklahoma
- Coordinates: 35°39′21″N 97°28′25″W
- Built: 1892
- Architect: J.G. Haskell
- NRHP reference No.: 71000671
- Added to NRHP: June 21, 1971

Old North Tower (or Old North) is the oldest building on the University of Central Oklahoma campus in Edmond, Oklahoma, and the oldest building of higher education in the state of Oklahoma. Originally built in 1892, it was the first permanent building on the Territorial Normal School campus.

== History ==
The construction of Old North, designed by J.G. Haskell began in the summer of 1892, and classes began in January 1893.

Early in Old North's history the building was deemed unsafe. In 1911, the structure was set for demolition, but instead was renovated. A major milestone for Old North was when the building was added to the National Register of Historic Places in 1971. In 1996, President Bill Clinton gave a speech outside of Old North.

== Renovation ==
The university closed Old North in 2001 because of structural and safety issues. Old North was left dormant until funds could be raised to renovate the building. The $11 million of renovations include the addition of an east wing, an amphitheater, additional maintenance space, and elevators to make the building ADA compliant. The building was the centerpiece of UCO's Always Central campaign to raise $40 million; however, the renovations were scheduled to be the last portion of the campaign. In 2017, the building officially reopened.
