= Oklahoma City Discovery Well =

- U.S. National Register of Historic Places
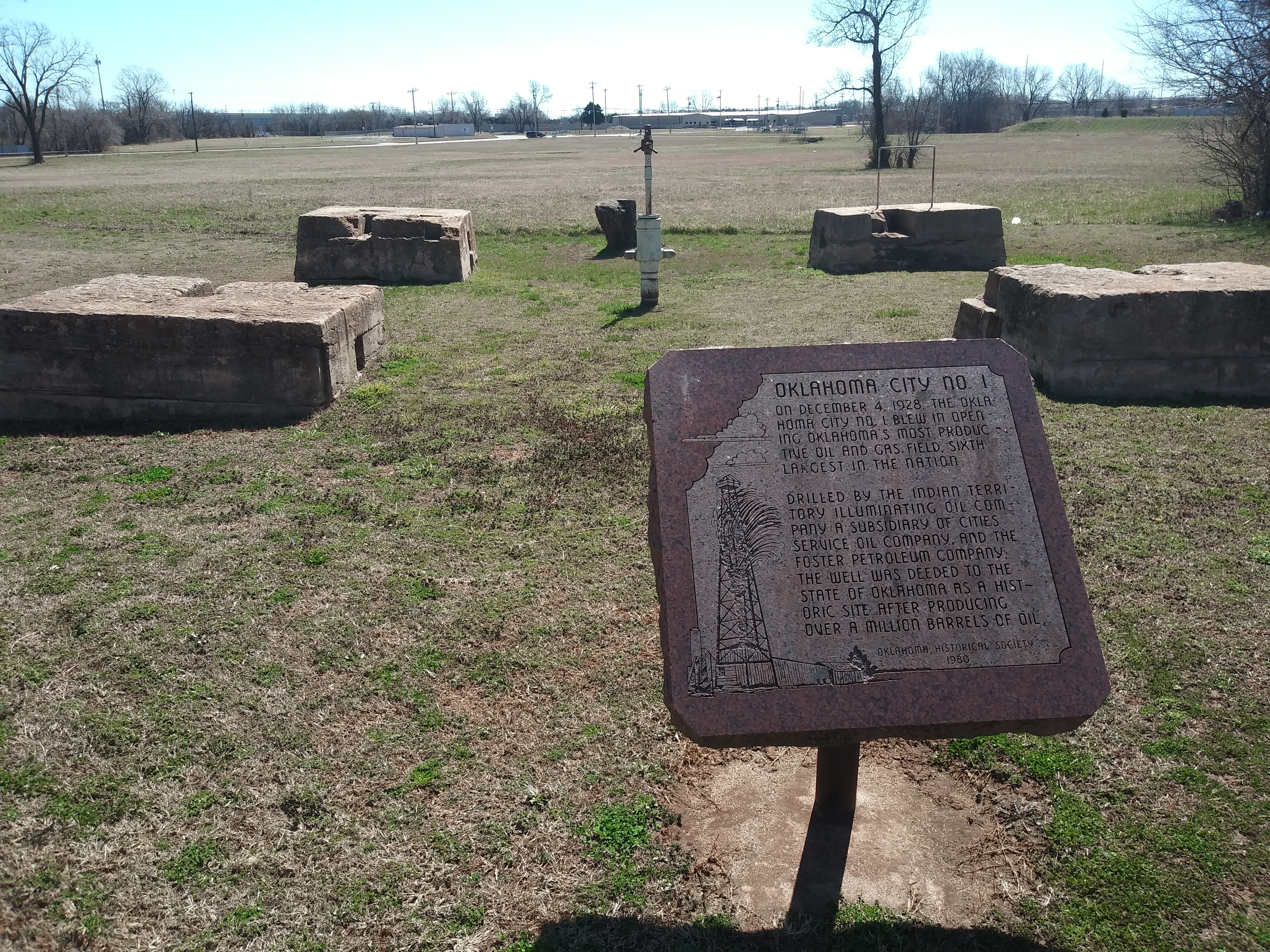

- Location within Oklahoma Location within the United States
- Location: SE 57th St. and ITIO Blvd., Oklahoma City, Oklahoma
- Coordinates: 35°24′29″N 97°27′40″W
- Area: less than one acre
- Built: 1928
- NRHP reference No.: 77001095
- Added to NRHP: December 9, 1977

The Oklahoma City Discovery Well was the first successful oil well to be drilled in Oklahoma City, Oklahoma. The December 4, 1928 discovery opened the Oklahoma City Oil Field to extensive exploitation, creating an oil boom that sustained the area through the Great Depression. Because much of the oil was under the existing city, the Oklahoma City field pioneered the use of directional drilling to allow lateral displacement of well bores to reach deposits under developed areas.

The well is located at the present-day intersection of SE 59th Street and Bryant Boulevard. It was drilled by the Indian Territory Illuminating Oil Company (ITIO). Beginning on June 12, 1928, the drilling crew drilled more than 6,000 feet (1,800 m). In early December they broke through the Arbuckle Limestone layer, noting that the bottom of the formation was saturated with oil and was under gas pressure. Since they were drilling with a cable tool rig, the flow of gas and oil could not be controlled, and on December 4 the gas blew the tools out of the well. The well produced 110,000 barrels of oil during its first 27 days. However, the well began to produce water by the end of 1928 and was abandoned.

The discovery well was placed on the National Register of Historic Places on December 9, 1977. The present site preserves the concrete drilling derrick foundations and the capped well head.
