= Pioneer Hall =

Pioneer Hall may refer to:

- Pioneer Hall (Duluth), a building at the Duluth Entertainment Convention Center
- Pioneer Hall (Oregon), a building on the campus of Linfield College in McMinnville, Oregon, listed on the NRHP in Oregon
- Pioneer Hall (Pleasant Hill, Tennessee), listed on the NRHP in Tennessee
- Pioneer Hall (Seattle), listed on the NRHP in King County, Washington
- Pioneer Hall (Texas Woman's University), a building on the campus of Texas Woman's University in Denton, Texas
- Pionir Ice Hall, an indoor ice hockey rink in Belgrade, Serbia

== See also ==
- Pioneer Building
