= Memorial Park Cemetery (Tulsa) =

Cemetery in Tulsa, Oklahoma, U.S.

Coordinates: 36°05′11″N 95°52′55″W

Memorial Park Cemetery is a cemetery in Tulsa, Oklahoma. It is located at 51st Street and South Memorial Drive, and is one of the largest locally formulated cemeteries in the Midwest with both curvilinear and rectilinear design styles. It is the tenth largest cemetery in the United States. There is a mausoleum, sculptures, a bell tower, and a World War I monument.

== History ==
The cemetery was established in 1927, and in 1950, Oklahoma's first crematorium was established there.

== Notable burials ==
- Reverend Billy Joe Daugherty (1952–2009), pastor
- Frank Frantz (1872–1941), politician and rough rider
- Jim Inhofe (1934-2024), US senator and congressman
- Sam Kinison (1953–1992), stand-up comedian
- Carl Morton (1944–1983), baseball player
- Steve Pryor (1955–2016), musician
- Reverend Oral Roberts (1918–2009), televangelist
- Leon Russell (1942–2016), musician
- Bob Wills (1905–1975), Western swing musician
- Johnnie Lee Wills (1912–1984), Western swing musician
