= Pioneer Building (Oklahoma City) =

Historic building in Oklahoma, United States

- U.S. National Register of Historic Places
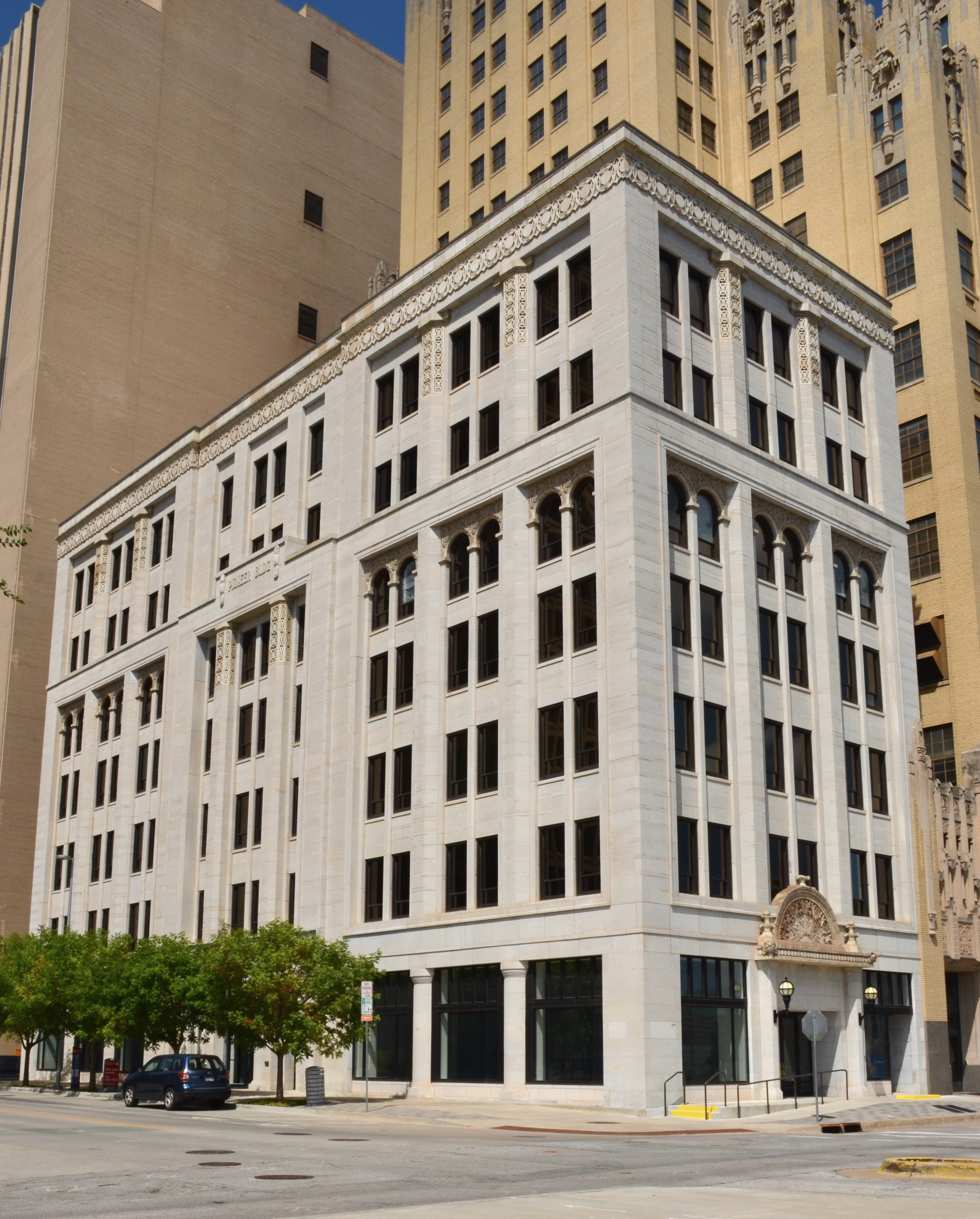

- Location within Oklahoma Location within the United States
- Location: 401 N. Broadway St., Oklahoma City, Oklahoma, US
- Coordinates: 35°28′16″N 97°30′51″W
- Area: 1 acre (0.40 ha)
- Built: 1907
- Architect: William A. Wells
- Architectural style: Late 19th And Early 20th Century American Movements, Sullivanesque
- NRHP reference No.: 80003289
- Added to NRHP: March 3, 1980

The Pioneer Building is a seven-story office building located at 103 Dean A. McGee Avenue in downtown Oklahoma City, Oklahoma, United States. Built in 1907, it was the original home office for the Pioneer Telephone Company. It was designed by William A. Wells in the Sullivanesque style. The building is on the National Register of Historic Places.

== Description ==
The Pioneer Building is located at 103 Dean A. McGee Avenue (formerly Third Street) in downtown Oklahoma City, Oklahoma, United States. It sits at the northwest corner with Broadway Street. The Pioneer Building designed by William A. Wells in the Sullivanesque style and is one of Wells's two remaining works dating from the era of Oklahoma's statehood. The structure rises seven stories. The building has a steel frame, which, at the time of the building's construction in 1907, had never been used in the city.

The facade is made of white-gray stone. It is divided vertically into three sections (base, shaft, and capital) with cut stone decoration. The base, consisting of the ground story, has massive cut-stone columns, windows, and two ornate entryways. The shaft, consisting of the second to fifth floors, has vertical angled piers, which flank groups of two windows per floor; there are spandrel panels between different floors, and arches above the fifth-floor openings. The sixth and seventh floors have a protruding cornice with intersecting circular architectural terracotta patterns, which continue along the tops of the hexagonal piers. The northeastern entrance has been modified with the construction of the adjacent Telephone Building (completed 1928). Blue-black granite storefronts, dating from a subsequent renovation, were removed in 2017.

Inside, the building spans 40,000 square feet (3,700 m^{2}). The main entrance has marble lintels and brackets, paneled walls, oak woodwork and glass mosaic floors. The interior corridors have Georgia marble floors and wainscoted walls. When built, the structure had a switchboard for 9,000 telephones. A lunchroom was provided for telephone operators. Some interiors were modified from 1928 onward.

== History ==
The Pioneer Building was built for the Pioneer Telephone Company, which first announced plans for a structure at Broadway and Third streets in early 1906. That May, the Gross Construction Company submitted a low bid of $105,000 for the building's construction. A building permit was issued the next month for a five-story brick building on the site, costing $125,000 and occupying an area of 50 by 140 feet (15 by 43 m). The building was subsequently changed to a seven-story marble structure, whose steel frame had been constructed by that October. Despite a windstorm in March 1907 that twisted the building's steel framework, the building was nearly complete by 1907; it had cost an estimated $175,000.

The Pioneer Building was Oklahoma City's tallest building for the time, and the Daily Oklahoman wrote that the structure had been "the city's first true skyscraper". The company had been the first in Oklahoma City to serve the whole city, but in 1915, the firm was bought out by Bell Telephone Company. Bell Telephone subsidiary Southwestern Bell subsequently built additional structures to the north in 1928 and to the west in 1960. Blue-black granite panels replaced the ground-level windows in 1974, and Southwestern Bell renovated the building during that decade. The Pioneer Building was listed on the National Register of Historic Places in 1980; by that decade, the Daily Oklahoman wrote that the building's "contrasting horizontal zones, strong vertical expression and delicate ornamentation" made it a "masterpiece".

In 2016, it was proposed for renovation. It was sold in 2017 to a syndicate composed of investors Roy Oliver, Mark Beffort, and Andy Burnett. The renovation, which uncovered long-concealed storefronts on the facade, was designed by Jeremy Gardner. Because the building occupied its entire land lot and had insufficient floor area, new heating and air conditioning equipment was installed on the roof. Work was completed in 2019.

== See also ==
- National Register of Historic Places listings in Oklahoma County, Oklahoma
