= Smith Cemetery =

Cemetery in Moore, Oklahoma

Coordinates: 35.3056°N 97.4937°W

Smith Cemetery is a cemetery in Moore, Oklahoma. It is located at the intersection of S. Telephone Road and S.W. 34th Street in Moore. The cemetery has a west and east end separated by a paved section in the middle. It is two acres (0.809371 hectares) large.

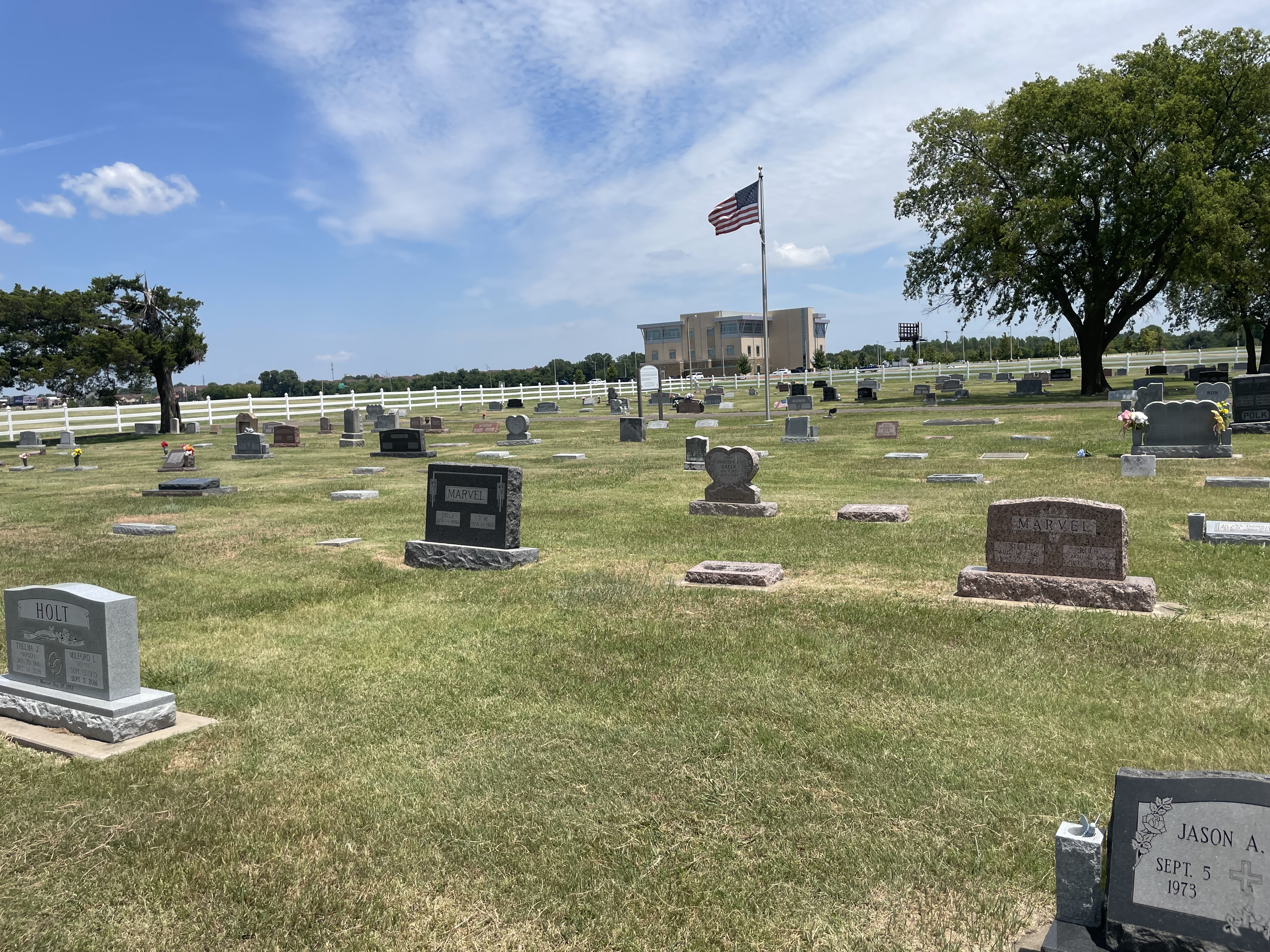
Smith Cemetery in 2025
