= Perryman Cemetery =

Cemetery in Tulsa, Oklahoma

- Interactive map of Perryman Cemetery

Details
- Established: 1879
- Location: E 32nd St; Tulsa, Oklahoma
- Country: United States
- Coordinates: 36°7.025′N 95°58.048′W
- Type: Private
- Owned by: Tulsa Historical Society
- No. of graves: ~50
- Find a Grave: Perryman Cemetery

Perryman Cemetery is a cemetery in Tulsa, Oklahoma and considered Tulsa's oldest private cemetery. It is located on the 1849 cattle ranch of Lewis Perryman and his son, George Perryman. There are approximately fifty graves dating from 1879 to 1941. While the land has gone through many changes, the cemetery itself was eventually sold to the Tulsa Historical Society in 1987 and has since been well maintained.

== History ==
=== Family History ===
In 1828, Benjamin Perryman and his family arrived in what was then Indian Territory. Perryman was accompanied by his six sons and two daughters. They settled near the Arkansas River where they ran a trading post while raising cattle. In 1848, the family, led by Benjamin's son Lewis Perryman, moved to what would become Tulsa after a cholera outbreak.

Following the American Civil War, Lewis's son George took over the cattle business after his father's death, and thus the cemetery. During this time George became known as the "Indian cattle king of the Creek Nation". He later married Rachel Alexander in 1868. While the couple had seven kids of their own, they would eventually take in twenty other orphans to raise. Alexander became affectionately known as "Aunt Rachel" to her adoptees.

In 1879, George's brother Josiah established the first post office on the same land as the cemetery, though the location moved downtown once the St. Louis–San Francisco Railway was built through town. After George's death, Rachel was convinced to sell the house to a land developer for $60,000. The house, commonly referred to as the "White House," was moved in 1912 to another location where it has been maintained and renovated to this day. The land where it once stood was used for a courthouse, which would then later be demolished to pave way for the Fourth National Bank tower.

=== Cemetery History ===
The land for Perryman Cemetery was originally laid out in 1848, with its first marked burial coming in 1879. The cemetery remained in use by the Perryman family well into the 20th century with the last burial being William Shirk in 1941. There are approximately fifty graves in the cemetery today, including several unknown soldiers from the Civil War.

The cemetery began falling into disrepair by the 1950s, suffering from neglect and vandalism. There were short lived plans to move several of the bodies interred at the cemetery to make way for new housing developments before the land was deeded to the Tulsa Historical Society in 1987 by Mary and Newman Perryman. The cemetery has since been restored, and there is currently an effort to identify several of the unmarked graves that currently are housed in the cemetery.

== Notable Internments ==
- Lydia Perryman Beaver, first internment (d. 1879)
- George Perryman (1846–1899)
- "Aunt" Rachel Perryman (1852–1933)
- Josiah Perryman, first postmaster of Tulsa (1840–1889)
- Legus Perryman, principal chief of the Creek Nation (1838–1922)
- Hannah Hayes Alexander, survivor of the Trail of Tears (d. 1899)
