= Frontline Church (Oklahoma City) =

Historic church in Oklahoma, United States

- First Christian Church
- U.S. National Register of Historic Places
- U.S. Historic district – Contributing property
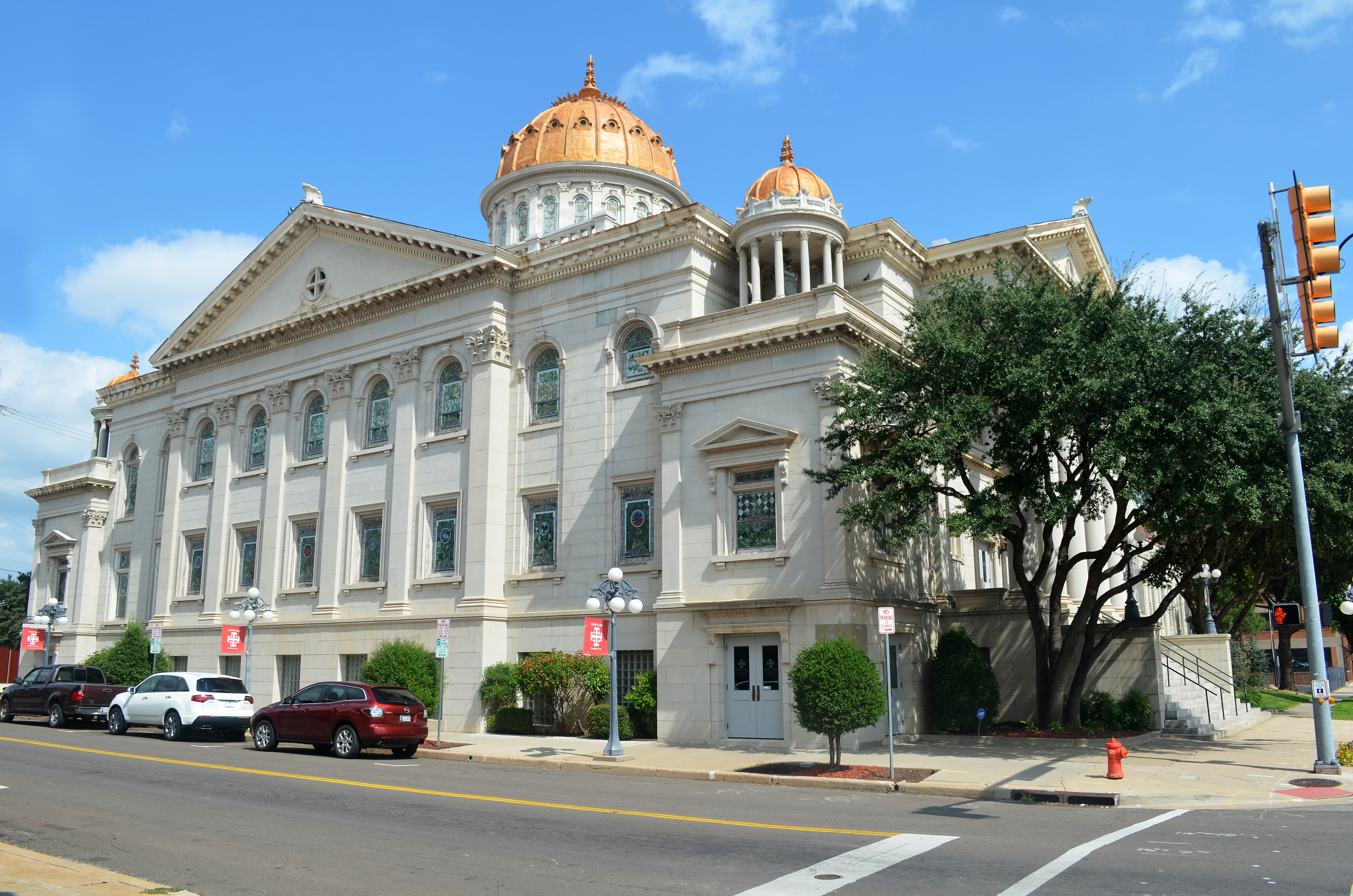

- Location within Oklahoma Location within the United States
- Location: 1104 N. Robinson Ave., Oklahoma City, Oklahoma
- Coordinates: 35°28′43″N 97°31′35″W
- Area: less than one acre
- Built: 1910 or 1911
- Architectural style: Classical Revival
- Part of: Automobile Alley Historic District (ID99000351)
- NRHP reference No.: 84003383
- Added to NRHP: March 8, 1984

The First Christian Church (now known as Frontline Church or Renaissance Center) is a historic church building at 1104 N. Robinson Avenue in Oklahoma City, Oklahoma. It was built in 1911. The original congregation moved from this location to the new First Christian Church in December 1956.

It was listed on the National Register of Historic Places in 1984.

It was deemed significant for its architectural style, being deemed the "best example of an ecclesiastical structure utilizing the Neo-Classical Revival style found in Oklahoma City."

It was built in 1910. In 1983, it was being renovated, partly funded by tax credits.
