= Meeker, Oklahoma =

- Town
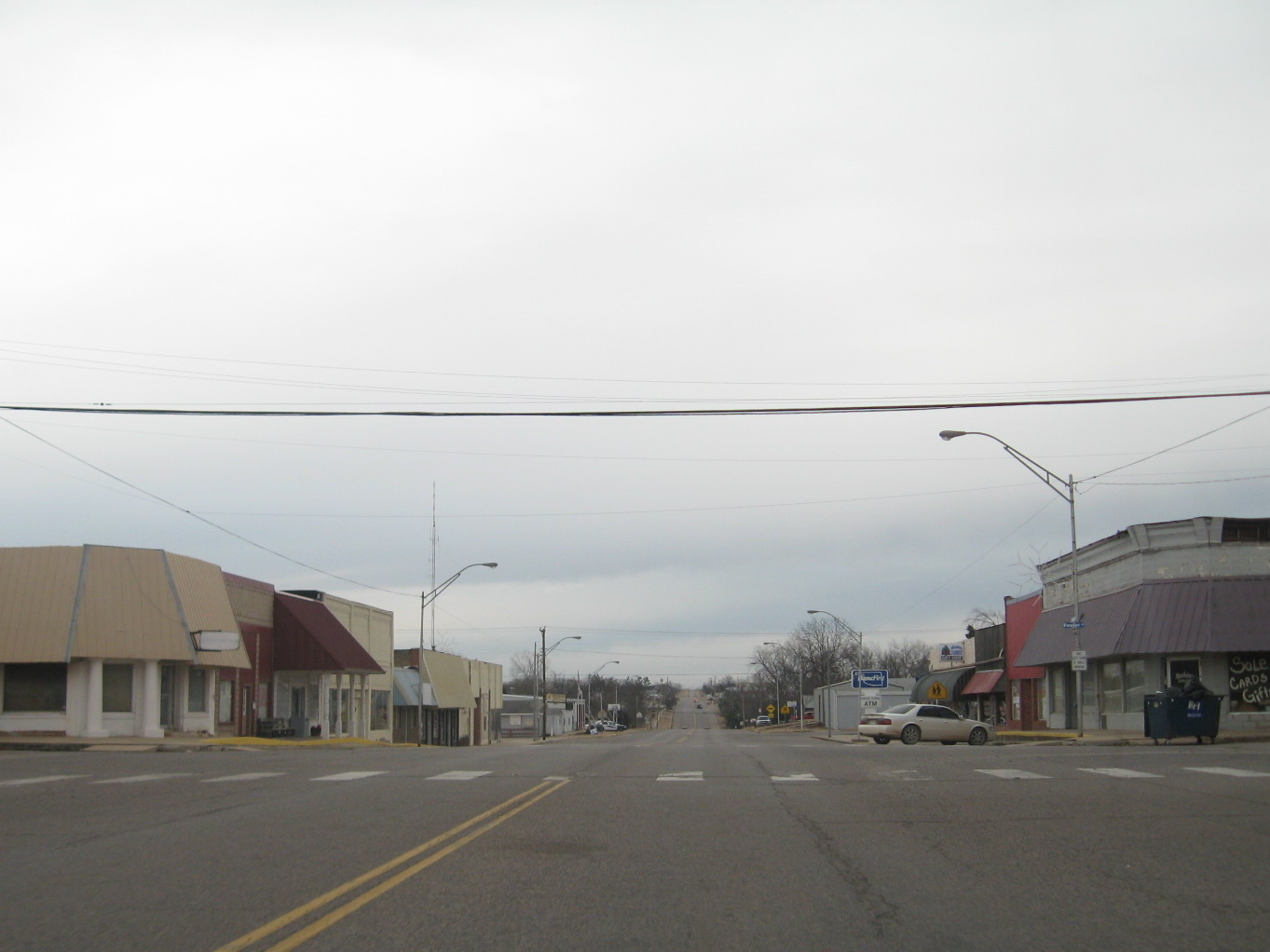
- Meeker as seen from U.S. Highway 62.

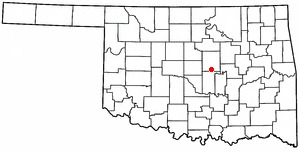
- Location of Meeker, Oklahoma
- Coordinates: 35°30′13″N 96°53′52″W
- Country: United States
- State: Oklahoma
- County: Lincoln

Area
  - Total: 3.01 sq mi (7.80 km^{2})
  - Land: 2.94 sq mi (7.62 km^{2})
  - Water: 0.069 sq mi (0.18 km^{2})
- Elevation: 968 ft (295 m)

Population (2020)
  - Total: 1,004
  - Density: 341.2/sq mi (131.74/km^{2})
- Time zone: UTC−6 (Central (CST))
  - Summer (DST): UTC−5 (CDT)
- ZIP code: 74855
- Area code: 405/572
- FIPS code: 40-47450
- GNIS feature ID: 2412978
- Website: www.townofmeekerok.com

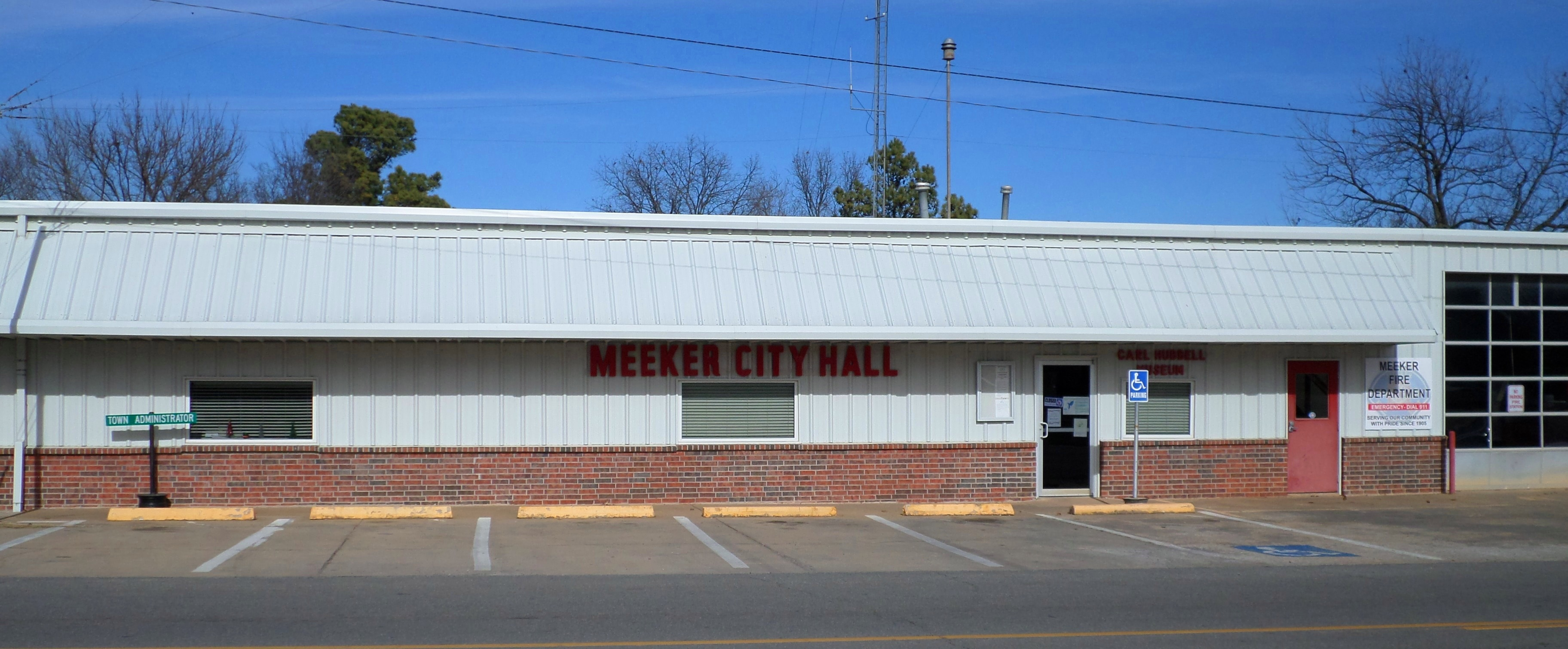
Meeker City Hall

Meeker is a town in Lincoln County, Oklahoma, United States. As of the 2020 census, the community had 1,004 residents. The locale is old enough to appear on a 1911 Rand McNally map of the county. It was prominently featured in the documentary Will & Harper.

== Geography ==
According to the United States Census Bureau, the town has a total area of 3.2 square miles (8.3 km^{2}), of which 3.2 square miles (8.3 km^{2}) is land and 0.04 square miles (0.10 km^{2}) (0.63%) is water.

== Demographics ==
Historical population
Census	Pop.	Note	%±
1910	349		—
1920	513		47.0%
1930	562		9.6%
1940	502		−10.7%
1950	672		33.9%
1960	664		−1.2%
1970	804		21.1%
1980	1,032		28.4%
1990	1,003		−2.8%
2000	978		−2.5%
2010	1,144		17.0%
2020	1,004		−12.2%
U.S. Decennial Census

=== 2020 census ===
As of the 2020 census, Meeker had a population of 1,004. The median age was 44.1 years. 23.3% of residents were under the age of 18 and 27.6% of residents were 65 years of age or older. For every 100 females there were 87.7 males, and for every 100 females age 18 and over there were 79.5 males age 18 and over.

0.0% of residents lived in urban areas, while 100.0% lived in rural areas.

There were 399 households in Meeker, of which 30.3% had children under the age of 18 living in them. Of all households, 40.1% were married-couple households, 18.0% were households with a male householder and no spouse or partner present, and 35.1% were households with a female householder and no spouse or partner present. About 31.3% of all households were made up of individuals and 15.8% had someone living alone who was 65 years of age or older.

There were 496 housing units, of which 19.6% were vacant. The homeowner vacancy rate was 2.8% and the rental vacancy rate was 15.4%.

Racial composition as of the 2020 census
Race	Number	Percent
White	801	79.8%
Black or African American	9	0.9%
American Indian and Alaska Native	92	9.2%
Asian	4	0.4%
Native Hawaiian and Other Pacific Islander	1	0.1%
Some other race	9	0.9%
Two or more races	88	8.8%
Hispanic or Latino (of any race)	38	3.8%

=== 2000 census ===
As of the census of 2000, there were 978 people, 409 households, and 269 families residing in the town. The population density was 309.1 inhabitants per square mile (119.3/km^{2}). There were 478 housing units at an average density of 151.1 per square mile (58.3/km^{2}). The racial makeup of the town was 84.56% White, 0.72% African American, 9.82% Native American, 0.20% Asian, 0.20% from other races, and 4.50% from two or more races. Hispanic or Latino of any race were 1.33% of the population.

There were 409 households, out of which 35.2% had children under the age of 18 living with them, 48.7% were married couples living together, 14.4% had a female householder with no husband present, and 34.0% were non-families. 30.8% of all households were made up of individuals, and 15.2% had someone living alone who was 65 years of age or older. The average household size was 2.39 and the average family size was 3.02.

In the town, the age distribution of the population shows 30.0% under the age of 18, 7.9% from 18 to 24, 25.7% from 25 to 44, 21.6% from 45 to 64, and 14.9% who were 65 years of age or older. The median age was 36 years. For every 100 females, there were 83.5 males. For every 100 females age 18 and over, there were 77.9 males.

The median income for a household in the town was $25,313, and the median income for a family was $34,659. Males had a median income of $31,146 versus $21,500 for females. The per capita income for the town was $13,344. About 16.1% of families and 19.1% of the population were below the poverty line, including 28.1% of those under age 18 and 6.8% of those age 65 or over.

== Notable person ==
Carl Hubbell, American baseball player and Hall of Famer, was raised in Meeker.

== NRHP sites ==
The following sites in Meeker are listed on the National Register of Historic Places:

- Crescent School
- Fairview School
- Hendley Manor
- Meeker Town Hall
- Spring Dell School
- St. Paul Baptist Church and Cemetery
