= Threatt Filling Station =

Filling station near Luther, Oklahoma

- U.S. National Register of Historic Places
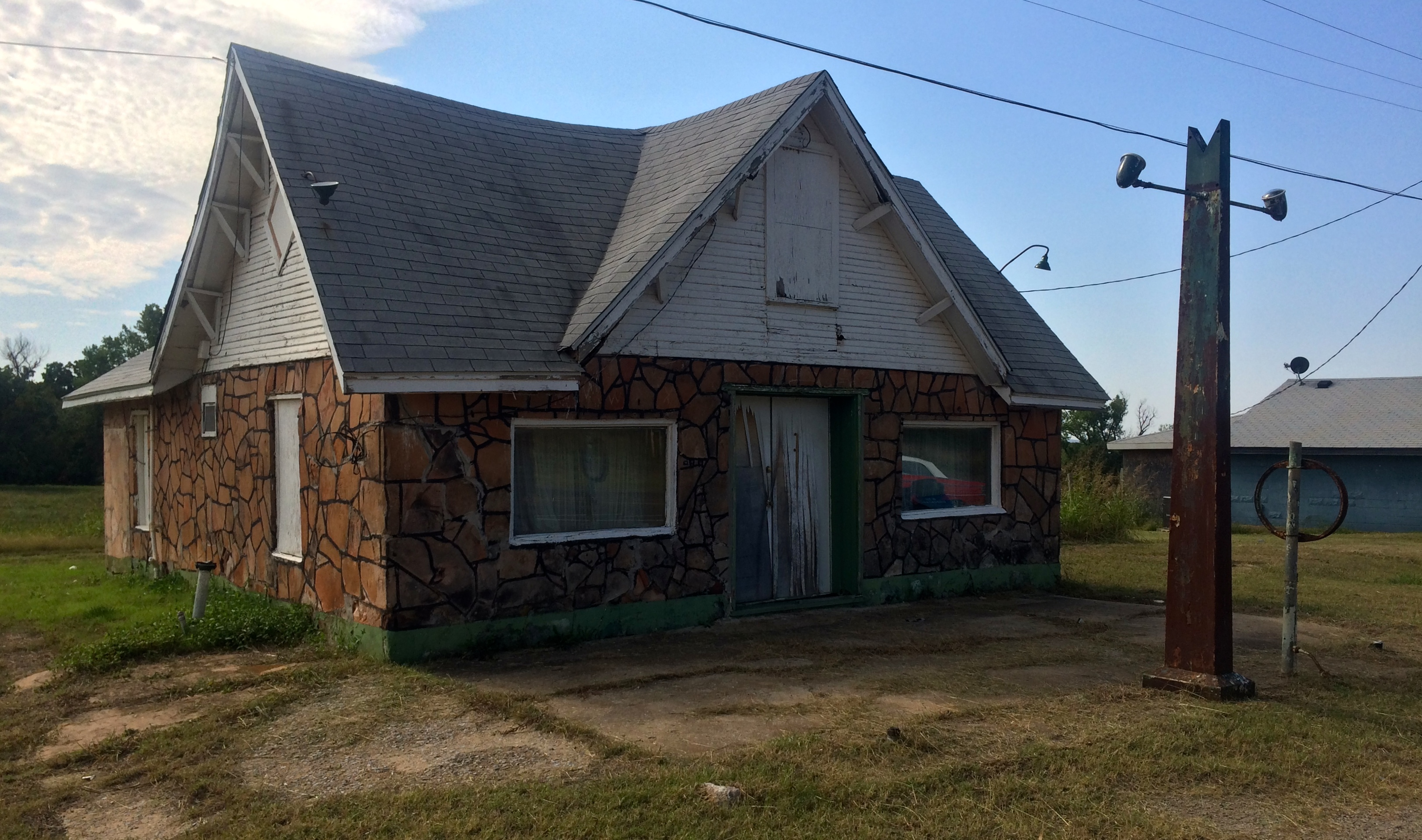

- Location within Oklahoma
- Nearest city: Luther, Oklahoma
- Coordinates: 35°39′59″N 97°08′28″W
- Area: less than one acre
- Built: c.1915
- Built by: Threatt, Allen
- Architectural style: Bungalow/craftsman
- MPS: Route 66 in Oklahoma MPS
- NRHP reference No.: 95000038
- Added to NRHP: February 23, 1995

The Threatt Filling Station, at the southwestern corner of the former U.S. Route 66 and Pottawatomi Rd. about 3 miles (4.8 km) east of Luther, Oklahoma (which is about 20 miles (32 km) east of Oklahoma City), is a filling station built around 1915. The station closed in the 1970s. It was listed on the National Register of Historic Places in 1995.

It is "an example of a 'house' type of station, designed in the Bungalow/Craftsman style of architecture."

Its original c.1915 gas pumps had glass globes on top so that the amount of gasoline to be dispensed could be determined, but those were replaced by two c.1940 pumps.

During the Jim Crow era, the Threatt Filling Station provided a place where black travelers, limited by laws restricting travel and accommodations, could stop, shop, and park for the night or just rest while traveling.

The property in which the station was located was owned by the Threatt family, a black family that engaged in multiple entrepreneurial avenues. The Threatt family estate also provided a safe haven for displaced blacks from the Tulsa race massacre in 1921.
