= Kickapoo Turnpike =

Toll highway in Oklahoma

Kickapoo Turnpike
- The Kickapoo Turnpike highlighted in red

Route information
- Auxiliary route of I-35
- Maintained by OTA
- Length: 19.6 mi (31.5 km)
- Existed: October 13, 2020–present
- Component highways: I-335 entire length

Major junctions
- South end: SE 89th Street in Oklahoma City
- I-40 / US 270 / SH-3 in Oklahoma City; US 62 in Harrah
- North end: I-44 / Turner Turnpike in Luther

Location
- Country: United States
- State: Oklahoma

Highway system
- Oklahoma State Highway System; Interstate; US; State; Turnpikes
← Indian Nation Turnpike	→ Kilpatrick Turnpike

The Kickapoo Turnpike, signed Interstate 335 (I-335) since November 2024, is a 19.6-mile (31.5 km) controlled-access toll road in the U.S. state of Oklahoma. The northern section from U.S. Route 62 (US 62) to I-44 (Turner Turnpike) opened to traffic on October 13, 2020. The southern segment from SE 89th Street to US 62 opened to traffic on January 5, 2021. Despite the designation as I-335, a connection with I-35 will not be made until the southern extension of the turnpike to Purcell is built.

== Route description ==
The turnpike begins just east of Luther Road, at an at-grade intersection with SE 89th Street, on the Oklahoma–Cleveland county line. It heads north and features a southbound-only interchange with I-40 a half-mile (800 m) later. There are four other interchanges between its termini: SE 29th Street, Reno Avenue, NE 23rd Street (US-62), and Britton Road. A toll plaza is on the turnpike in the vicinity of Hefner Road and NE 122nd Street. The Kickapoo Turnpike ends at a trumpet interchange with I-44 (Turner Turnpike) in Luther, just east of I-44 exit 146 (the Luther/Jones interchange).

== History ==
The turnpike project originally was given the name "Northeast Oklahoma County Loop." The road itself was proposed on October 29, 2015, by Gov. Mary Fallin, as part of the state's Driving Forward initiative. On June 6, 2016, the tollway was approved by the Oklahoma Department of Transportation, under the working title Eastern Oklahoma County Turnpike. In September 2019, "Kickapoo Turnpike" was announced as the tollway's official name.

=== Construction ===
The first piece of the turnpike to be constructed was the interchange with I-44, at the northern end of the route. Construction on this interchange began in January 2018. Phase 1, which stretches from the Turner Turnpike to US 62 (23rd Street) in Harrah, opened on October 13, 2020. Phase 2, which opened on January 5, 2021, connects the rest of the Turnpike to Interstate 40, linking I-40 directly to Interstate 44 on the eastern side of the Oklahoma City metro. The cost of constructing the Kickapoo Turnpike has been estimated to be more than $440 million (2018 dollars).

=== Opposition ===
In January 2016, a group calling itself Citizens Opposed to the Eastern Oklahoma County Loop-Turnpike-Interstate was reported to have created a Facebook page in opposition to the proposed turnpike. Following months of meetings and protests, Neal McCaleb, interim director for the Oklahoma Turnpike Authority (OTA), released a statement saying that, because of public input and the work of engineering professionals, the estimated number of homes that would eventually be lost to construction had been reduced by 22 percent, from 103 houses to 80.

In August 2016, a lawsuit was filed against the OTA, claiming that the agency, in issuing $900 million in bonds to be used for multiple toll road projects, was in violation of the Oklahoma Constitution, which stipulates that laws passed may address only one subject. On December 13, 2016, the Oklahoma Supreme Court ruled in favor of the OTA, stating that the agency had properly authorized the bond issue and given "valid notice of this application."

=== Interstate designation ===
On August 2, 2021, the Oklahoma Transportation Commission approved the designation of the Kickapoo Turnpike as part of an extension of Interstate 240 (I-240), forming a beltway around Oklahoma City. ODOT Director Tim Gatz stated in the Transportation Commission meeting that the numbering change was primarily to aid in navigation using digital mapping and routing applications. Gatz also said, "If you look at the Interstate 240 designation on the loop around the Oklahoma City metropolitan area, we are finally to the point where we have a truly contiguous route there that can shoulder the burden of some of that transportation need in a loop format. That's common practice across the country, and you'll see that in many of the metropolitan areas, and that update will really be beneficial as far as everything from signage to how do you describe that route on a green-and-white sign." The designation would have needed to be approved by the American Association of State Highway and Transportation Officials (AASHTO) and the Federal Highway Administration (FHWA) to take effect. The plan was recycled into adding a I-335 designation instead of extending I-240.

== Future ==
A southern extension of the Turnpike to I-35 is planned. As a result, AASHTO approved an application from ODOT to assign it the interstate designation I-335 in November 2023. This was recycled from the original plan from August 2021 where they were going to extend the existing I-240. In March 2024, the OTA announced that it would be updating signage for the turnpike over the next two months. The current turnpike logo would be removed and replaced with I-335 shields along with the yellow "TOLL" banner. I-240 will not be extended nor be part of the turnpike and the future interstate will not connect to its parent route until the southern extension is completed.

== Tolls ==
On March 1, 2016, toll rates on all turnpikes in Oklahoma increased for the first time since June 2009. The rate hike was implemented to help fund the Driving Forward initiative, which includes improvements and/or extensions to five other Oklahoma toll roads, as well as the construction of the Kickapoo Turnpike from scratch.

As of January 25, 2022, it costs $3.95 with PlatePay ($1.90 with Pikepass) to drive the entire length of the turnpike.

== Exit list ==
Exit numbers branch off of I-44's mileage markers.

County	Location	mi	km	Exit	Destinations	Notes
McClain	Purcell				I-35	Proposed southern terminus; South Extension Turnpike continues beyond I-35 towards SH-74
Canadian River				Bridge		
Cleveland					US 77	Proposed interchange
Cleveland	Noble–Norman line				Etowah Road	Proposed interchange
Cleveland	Norman				SH-9	Proposed interchange
Cleveland	Norman				Alameda Drive	Proposed interchange
Cleveland	Norman				East-West Connector west	Proposed interchange; proposed northern terminus of South Extension Turnpike
Cleveland	Oklahoma City				South Choctaw Road	Proposed interchange
Cleveland	Oklahoma City				South Peebly Road	Proposed interchange
Cleveland–Oklahoma county line	Oklahoma City	0.00	0.00	129	SE 89th Street	Current southern terminus; at-grade intersection
Oklahoma	Oklahoma City	0.5– 1.3	0.80– 2.1	130	I-40 (US 270 / SH-3) – Oklahoma City, Fort Smith	Southbound exit and northbound entrance; full interchange to be constructed in future; signed as exits 130B (east) and 130A (west); exit 170 on I-40; proposed eastern terminus of East-West Connector
Oklahoma	Harrah	3.9	6.3	134	SE 29th Street – McLoud	
Oklahoma	Harrah	6.0	9.7	136	East Reno Avenue	
Oklahoma	Harrah	8.2	13.2	138	US 62 (NE 23rd Street) – Choctaw, Harrah	
Oklahoma	Harrah	13.2	21.2	144	East Britton Road – Jones	
Oklahoma				Toll Gantry		
Oklahoma	Luther	19.6	31.5	149	I-44 (Turner Turnpike) – Tulsa, Oklahoma City	Northern terminus; signed as exits 149B (east) and 149A (west); exit 149 on I-44 / Turnpike
1.000 mi = 1.609 km; 1.000 km = 0.621 mi: Electronic toll collection; Incomplete access; Proposed
