= Choctaw High School =

Public high school in Choctaw, Oklahoma

Coordinates: 35.4773°N 97.2795°W

Location
- 14300 NE 10th Street; Choctaw, Oklahoma 73020; United States

Information
- Type: Co-Educational, Public, Secondary
- School district: Choctaw-Nicoma Park School District
- Authority: OSDE
- Principal: Jackie Harris
- Staff: 81.60 (on an FTE basis)
- Grades: 9-12
- Enrollment: 1,853 (2023-2024)
- Student to teacher ratio: 22.71
- Colors: Blue and gold
- Athletics conference: OSSAA Class 6A
- Mascot: Yellowjacket
- Website: https://choctawhighschool.cnpschools.org/

Choctaw High School is a public high school (grades 9-12) in Choctaw, Oklahoma. It is a part of the Choctaw-Nicoma Park School District.

The district (of which this is the sole comprehensive high school) includes the majority of Choctaw as well as most of Nicoma Park and portions of Harrah, Midwest City, and Oklahoma City.

As of 2024, it has approximately 1,811 students and 76 teachers (FTE) for a student-teacher ratio of approximately 23.8:1. In 2024 it was ranked as the 221st best high school in Oklahoma by US News. It is the only high school in the Choctaw-Nicoma Park School District.

== Athletics ==
Choctaw offers the following sports to its students:

- Baseball
- Basketball
- Cheer
- Cross Country
- Football
- Golf
- Power Lifting
- Soccer
- Softball
- Swimming
- Tennis
- Track
- Volleyball
- Wrestling

== State championships ==
Activity	Year
Academic Bowl	2017, 2018
Baseball	1952, 1974
Basketball (Girls)	1945, 1975, 1995, 2017
Cheer	1999, 2008, 2009, 2010, 2011, 2024
Fast Pitch Softball	1994, 2015
Football	1960, 2024
Jazz Band	2018, 2019
Drama (One Act)	2001, 2002, 2003, 2006, 2008, 2009, 2011, 2012, 2013, 2014, 2015, 2016, 2018, 2019, 2020, 2021
Wrestling	1994, 1996, 1997, 1999, 2016, 2018
Wrestling Dual	1994, 1996, 1997, 2016, 2018

== Notable alumni ==
- Terrill Davis, NFL wide receiver for the Minnesota Vikings
- Andrew Mitchell, former NFL player and current coach
