= Shirley Ann Bruce Darrell =

American politician (1936–2013)

Oklahoma County Commissioner for District 1
- In office January 1983 – 1998
- Preceded by: Ralph Adair
- Succeeded by: Beverly Hodges

Personal details
- Born: Shirley Ann Bruce; June 29, 1936 Oklahoma City, Oklahoma, United States
- Died: May 8, 2013 (aged 76)
- Party: Democratic Party
- Spouse: Lewis Eugene Darrell (m. 1957)
- Children: 3
- Education: Hampton Institute; Oklahoma City University

Shirley Ann Bruce Darrell (June 29, 1936 – May 8, 2013) was an American politician who was the first Black person elected as a county commissioner in the state of Oklahoma. She served on the Oklahoma County Board of County Commissioners representing District 1 from 1983 to 1998.

== Early life and education ==
Shirley Ann Bruce Darrell was born Shirley Ann Bruce on June 29, 1936, in Oklahoma City to Elizabeth Lilliam Williams and Jessie Julian Bruce. Her father was an attorney, freemason, and board chair for the Oklahoma City Eastside YWCA. Her mother was a schoolteacher at Dunbar Elementary School in Oklahoma City. On August 10, 1957, she married Lewis Eugene Darrell, a Bermudan teacher, and the couple had three daughters.

In 1954, she graduated from Douglass High School and she later graduated from the Hampton Institute in Virginia with a bachelor's degree and Oklahoma City University with a master's degree.

== Career ==
In the 1970s, she served on the Oklahoma City Public Schools Board of Education. In 1982, she resigned from the Federal Aviation Administration to run for Oklahoma County Commissioner in District 1. She advanced to a Democratic Party primary runoff election alongside former mayor of Midwest City Marion Reed. After winning the runoff, she defeated Republican Robert Burns and independent William J. Maher in the November election. She served in office from 1983 until 1998. She was the first Black person elected as a county commissioner in the state of Oklahoma.

On May 8, 2013, Darrell died. She was buried in Trice Hill Cemetery in Oklahoma City
