= Spencer, Oklahoma =

- City
- Location in Oklahoma County and the state of Oklahoma.
- Coordinates: 35°30′28″N 97°22′14″W
- Country: United States
- State: Oklahoma
- County: Oklahoma

Area
  - Total: 5.38 sq mi (13.94 km^{2})
  - Land: 5.38 sq mi (13.94 km^{2})
  - Water: 0 sq mi (0.00 km^{2})
- Elevation: 1,168 ft (356 m)

Population (2020)
  - Total: 3,978
  - Density: 739.2/sq mi (285.42/km^{2})
- Time zone: UTC-6 (Central (CST))
  - Summer (DST): UTC-5 (CDT)
- ZIP code: 73084
- Area code: 405
- FIPS code: 40-69200
- GNIS feature ID: 2411952
- Website: www.cityofspencerok.gov

Spencer is a city in Oklahoma County, Oklahoma, United States, and a part of the Oklahoma City metropolitan area. Its population was 3,978 at the 2020 census, a 1.7% increase from 2010.

Established in 1903, the City of Spencer is a historic community located just east of the North Canadian River. Spencer is about 10 miles from downtown Oklahoma City and borders the cities of Nicoma Park to the east and Midwest City to the south.

Contributing to the cultural fabric of Spencer are the Spencer Chamber of Commerce, the Facebook page-Whats going on in Spencer Oklahoma, Spencer Senior Center, Spencer Parks Board, and the Spencer Historical Society.

== History ==
The region where Spencer was developed was opened to settlement in the Land Run of 1889. Louis F. and Henry W. Kramer, businessmen originally from Spencer County, Indiana, first arrived in Guthrie in 1889 and then moved to Oklahoma City.

Originally an agricultural area, Spencer grew after World War II with the nearby General Motors Assembly Plant and Tinker Air Force Base offering employment.

On January 20, 1982, seven children were killed by the explosion of a water heater in the cafeteria of the city's Star Elementary School.

CPT Riley L. Pitts, the first Black commissioned officer to receive the Medal of Honor, is buried in Spencer's Hillcrest Memory Gardens. Captain Pitts was a graduate of Wichita University (now Wichita State University.)

== Geography ==
According to the United States Census Bureau, the city has a total area of 5.3 square miles (14 km^{2}), all land.

== Demographics ==
Historical population
Census	Pop.	Note	%±
1960	1,189		—
1970	3,714		212.4%
1980	4,064		9.4%
1990	3,972		−2.3%
2000	3,746		−5.7%
2010	3,912		4.4%
2020	3,978		1.7%
U.S. Decennial Census

=== Racial and ethnic composition ===
Spencer city, Oklahoma – Racial and ethnic composition Note: the US Census treats Hispanic/Latino as an ethnic category. This table excludes Latinos from the racial categories and assigns them to a separate category. Hispanics/Latinos may be of any race.
Race / Ethnicity (NH = Non-Hispanic)	Pop 2000	Pop 2010	Pop 2020	% 2000	% 2010	% 2020
White alone (NH)	1,451	1,170	1,045	38.73%	29.91%	26.27%
Black or African American alone (NH)	1,932	2,191	2,029	51.58%	56.01%	51.01%
Native American or Alaska Native alone (NH)	102	113	114	2.72%	2.89%	2.87%
Asian alone (NH)	13	20	23	0.35%	0.51%	0.58%
Native Hawaiian or Pacific Islander alone (NH)	2	1	5	0.05%	0.03%	0.13%
Other race alone (NH)	1	9	24	0.03%	0.23%	0.60%
Mixed race or Multiracial (NH)	158	242	295	4.22%	6.19%	7.42%
Hispanic or Latino (any race)	87	166	443	2.32%	4.24%	11.14%
Total	3,746	3,912	3,978	100.00%	100.00%	100.00%

=== 2020 census ===
As of the 2020 census, Spencer had a population of 3,978. The median age was 40.6 years; 27.1% of residents were under the age of 18 and 17.6% were 65 years of age or older. For every 100 females there were 93.4 males, and for every 100 females age 18 and over there were 84.5 males age 18 and over.

93.9% of residents lived in urban areas, while 6.1% lived in rural areas.

There were 1,586 households in Spencer, of which 31.7% had children under the age of 18 living in them. Of all households, 34.0% were married-couple households, 22.3% were households with a male householder and no spouse or partner present, and 37.3% were households with a female householder and no spouse or partner present. About 31.6% of all households were made up of individuals and 13.2% had someone living alone who was 65 years of age or older.

There were 1,773 housing units, of which 10.5% were vacant. Among occupied housing units, 67.5% were owner-occupied and 32.5% were renter-occupied. The homeowner vacancy rate was 1.1% and the rental vacancy rate was 7.7%.

Racial composition as of the 2020 census
Race	Percent
White	27.8%
Black or African American	51.8%
American Indian and Alaska Native	3.0%
Asian	0.6%
Native Hawaiian and Other Pacific Islander	0.2%
Some other race	6.7%
Two or more races	9.8%

=== 2000 census ===
As of the census of 2000, 3,746 people, 1,420 households, and 1,002 families were residing in the city. The population density was 701.0 inhabitants per square mile (270.7/km^{2}). The 1,567 housing units had an average density of 293.3 per square mile (113.2/km^{2}). The racial makeup of the city was 39.94% White, 51.82% African American, 2.83% Native American, 0.35% Asian, 0.05% Pacific Islander, 0.51% from other races, and 4.51% from two or more races. Hispanics or Latinos of any race were 2.32% of the population.

Of the 1,420 households, 29.4% had children under 18 living with them, 47.0% were married couples living together, 17.8% had a female householder with no husband present, and 29.4% were not families. About 26.1% of all households were made up of individuals, and 11.5% had someone living alone who was 65 or older. The average household size was 2.59 and the average family size was 3.09.

In the city, the age distribution was 28.8% under 18, 7.8% from 18 to 24, 24.2% from 25 to 44, 24.1% from 45 to 64, and 15.1% who were 65 or older. The median age was 38 years. For every 100 females, there were 94.6 males. For every 100 females 18 and over, there were 88.4 males.

The median income for a household in the city was $31,116, and for a family was $37,470. Males had a median income of $30,199 versus $21,153 for females. The per capita income for the city was $18,242. About 15.0% of families and 19.1% of the population were below the poverty line, including 33.3% of those under 18 and 11.2% of those 65 or over.

== Education ==
Public education is provided by the Oklahoma City Public Schools. Zoned schools include Willow Brook Elementary School (prekindergarten-grade 1), Spencer Elementary School (grades 2-4), and Rogers Intermediate School (grades 5-6). The zoned secondary school is Star Spencer Mid-High School.

=== Dunjee School ===
Dundjee School, an all-Black school was built in 1934, and opened as a segregated school in 1935, serving black students in Spencer. The school is named after Black Oklahoma City civil rights leader Roscoe Dunjee. The school served first- through 12th-grade students, and according to Dr. Donnie Nero, the school was nurturing and enriching, but also tough. "Those teachers those educators made sure that we focused on being the best that we possibly could be so there wasn't a lot of time for foolishness or time to waste," said Nero. The school featured some of the best and brightest Black teachers, such as civil rights leader Clara Luper, and the Rev. W.B. Parker, pastor of nearby St. James Baptist Church. Dunjee School closed in 1972, devastating the community of Spencer.

The residents of the Dunjee area had long suffered at the hand of segregation in Oklahoma. Before 1963, it was part of the Choctaw school system. After years of substandard support from the City of Choctaw, they fought to be integrated into the Oklahoma City school system and won. However, in 1972, the school board closed all Dunjee schools and began bussing as part of the mandated laws of desegregation. The community was stunned.

Because of desegregation, Dunjee closed in 1972, a move that in many eyes damaged the Spencer community. When the school's doors shut for good, "it devastated this community," said Theotis Payne. In 2012, a fire causing $250,000 in damage made the school uninhabitable.

== City embezzlement scandal ==
In 2013, the City of Spencer came under fire after several officials affiliated with the city were accused of embezzling funds; this was perpetrated by three previous employees of the city. An estimated $6,200 in funds were missing from the payroll system, and the three employees were shortly charged with embezzlement.

== In popular culture ==
The 2026 made-in-Oklahoma film Gangland, starring Lou Diamond Phillips, was partially shot in Spencer.
