= Capitol Hill High School =

Public school in Oklahoma City, Oklahoma, United States

Coordinates: 35.4273°N 97.5224°W

Location
- 500 SW 36th Street; Oklahoma City, Oklahoma, Oklahoma 73109; United States

Information
- Type: Public
- Established: 1928
- School district: Oklahoma City Public Schools
- NCES District ID: 4022770
- Superintendent: Sean McDaniel
- Principal: Shari Gateley
- Teaching staff: 94.78 (FTE)
- Grades: 9-12
- Enrollment: 1,552 (2023-2024)
- Student to teacher ratio: 16.37
- Colors: Maroon and white
- Mascot: Red Wolves
- Website: https://chhs.okcps.org/

Capitol Hill High School (CHHS) is a public high school in Oklahoma City, Oklahoma. It is part of the Oklahoma City Public Schools.

In addition to parts of Oklahoma City, the school's boundary includes Valley Brook and a portion of Del City.

The high school has recorded a significant history with noteworthy success in interscholastic sports athletes and activities. Alumni include Allie Reynolds, a six-time all-star, and six-time World Series Champion, and Don Demeter. In 1949, Jack Van Pool played quarterback at the school and led it to a 12-0 season and state championship before becoming an Oklahoma Sooner and then joining the U.S. Army. Orville Moody was also an alumnus.

Rockabilly singer Wanda Jackson graduated from the school. Elmer Mulhausen wrote about his experiences at the school.

U.S. News reported the student body to be 73 percent Hispanic, 11 percent African American and 10 percent white.

In 1945, its yearbook was known as 'Chieftain.'

== History ==
Capitol Hill Junior High School was established in 1919. Capitol Hill High School opened in 1928. It was the first high school south of the North Canadian River in the city, a poorer section of town. In 2015, the school replaced its Redskins mascot with Red Wolves.
