= Nichols Hills, Oklahoma =

- City
- City of Nichols Hills
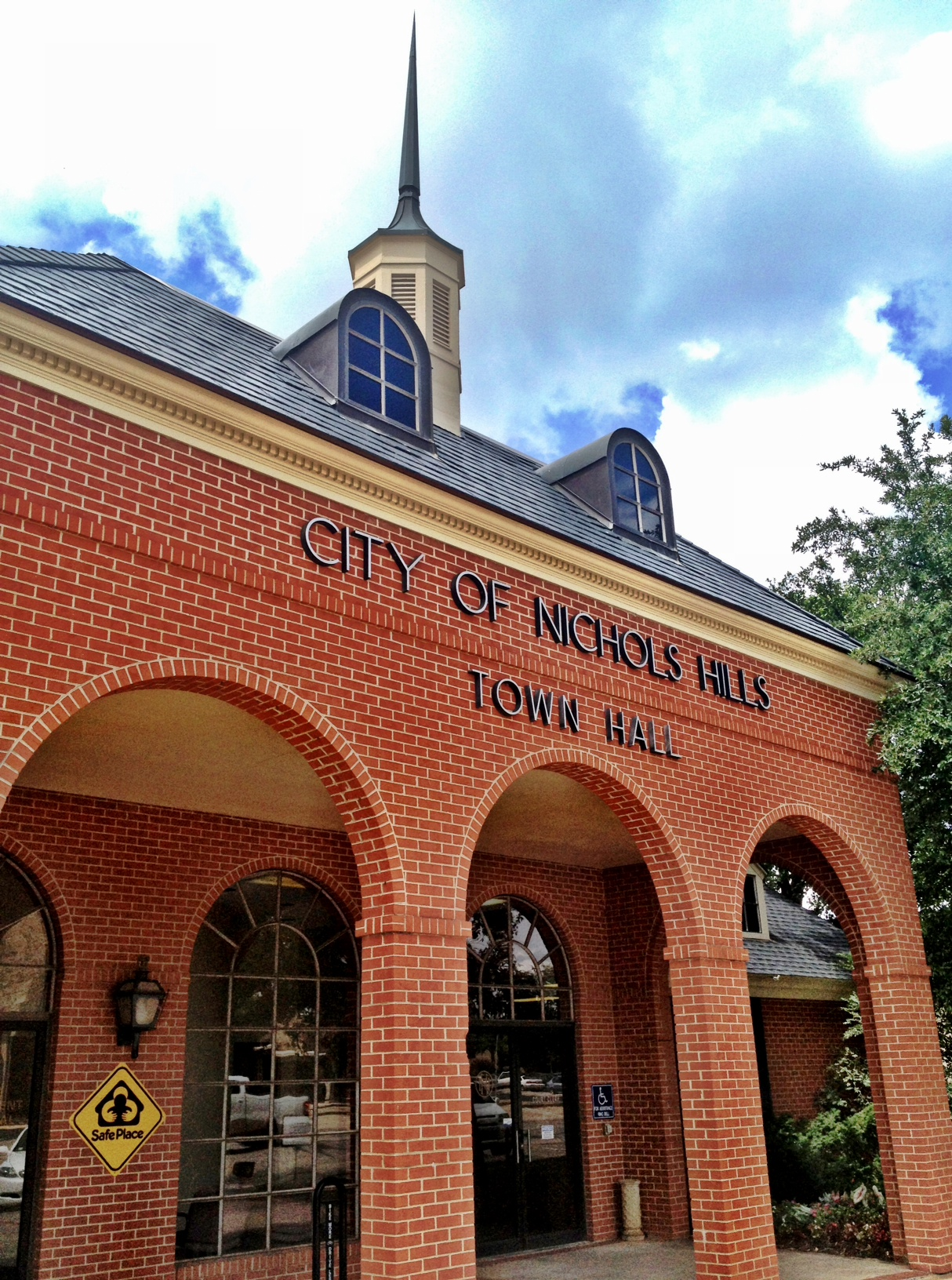
- City of Nichols Hills Town Hall

- Seal

- Location in Oklahoma County and the state of Oklahoma.

- Location in the United States Nichols Hills, Oklahoma (the United States)
- Coordinates: 35°32′49″N 97°32′40″W
- Country: United States
- State: Oklahoma
- County: Oklahoma
- Established: 1929

Government
  - Type: Council – Manager
  - Mayor: Sody Clements (R)
  - City Manager: S. Shane Pate, II
  - Vice-Mayor: E. Peter Hoffman, Jr.
  - Councilman: Steven J.Goetzinger

Area
  - Total: 1.98 sq mi (5.13 km^{2})
  - Land: 1.97 sq mi (5.11 km^{2})
  - Water: 0.012 sq mi (0.03 km^{2})
- Elevation: 1,204 ft (367 m)

Population (2020)
  - Total: 3,870
  - Density: 1,962.4/sq mi (757.67/km^{2})
- Time zone: UTC-6 (Central (CST))
  - Summer (DST): UTC-5 (CDT)
- ZIP codes: 73116, 73120
- Area code: 405
- FIPS code: 40-51800
- GNIS feature ID: 2411254
- Website: www.nicholshills-ok.gov

Nichols Hills is a city in Oklahoma County, Oklahoma, United States, and a part of the Oklahoma City metropolitan area. The population was 3,870 as of the 2020 census, a 4.3% increase from 2010.

== History ==
The 1,280 acres now known as Nichols Hills were developed as an exclusive residential area by Dr. G.A. Nichols in 1929. Between 1907 and 1929, Dr. Nichols, an Oklahoma City real estate pioneer, developed the University, Paseo Arts District, Military Park, Central Park, Winans, University Place, Gatewood, Harndale, Nichols University Place and Lincoln Terrace neighborhoods of Oklahoma City and designed the city of Nicoma Park, Oklahoma.

By 1928, Dr. Nichols saw many Oklahoma City residential neighborhoods being encroached by the Oklahoma City Oil Field and industrial districts. Recognizing the importance of protecting home owners, Dr. Nichols developed Nichols Hills by placing restrictions on undesirable commercial activity while at the same time comprehending the need for commercial shopping districts within the city. Dr. Nichols hired Hare and Hare, a Kansas City, Missouri landscape architecture firm known for its landscape designs for Kansas City's Country Club Plaza and Nelson-Atkins Museum of Art, to design the city in such a way as to follow the natural terrain of the countryside. The distinctive curving streets, named after English towns, were punctuated by small and large parks, two golf courses, bridle paths, a polo field, a club house, and tennis courts located throughout the city. Commercial districts were located by Dr. Nichols on the perimeter of the city. Nichols Hills was founded as a municipality in September 1929 and grew when Dr. Nichols dedicated additional property to the city.

During the early 1930s, The Great Depression took its toll on Nichols Hills’ finances and large investors in Nichols Hills' property became delinquent on their taxes. Nichols Hills petitioned Oklahoma City for annexation, but was refused. The refusal awakened the citizens of Nichols Hills, who thereafter embarked on a capital and beautification campaign that ultimately led to significant manor and upscale residential development after World War II.

By 1950, and after its failure to annex Nichols Hills, Oklahoma City began annexing the land surrounding Nichols Hills including some property which was originally platted by Dr. Nichols as part of Nichols Hills. Nichols Hills is now surrounded entirely by Oklahoma City on the south, east and west, and The Village on the north. In 1959, thwarting a potential annexation from Oklahoma City, the first city charter was formed. Since its inception, Nichols Hills has maintained strict land use restrictions and zoning ordinances.

Known for its quality housing, Nichols Hills and its citizens maintain parks running throughout the city. The city is home to the Oklahoma City Golf and Country Club which was designed by Perry Maxwell.

== Geography ==
According to the United States Census Bureau, the city has a total area of 2.0 square miles (5.2 km^{2}), of which 2.0 square miles (5.2 km^{2}) is land and 0.50% is water.

== Demographics ==
Historical population
Census	Pop.	Note	%±
1940	942		—
1950	2,606		176.6%
1960	4,897		87.9%
1970	4,478		−8.6%
1980	4,153		−7.3%
1990	4,020		−3.2%
2000	4,056		0.9%
2010	3,710		−8.5%
2020	3,870		4.3%
U.S. Decennial Census

=== 2020 census ===
As of the 2020 census, Nichols Hills had a population of 3,870, and the city remained a predominantly non-Hispanic white area.

One hundred percent of residents lived in urban areas, while none lived in rural areas. The median age was 48.8 years, with 20.1% of residents under the age of 18 and 26.8% aged 65 or older. For every 100 females there were 95.2 males, and for every 100 females age 18 and over there were 90.9 males age 18 and over.

There were 1,587 households in Nichols Hills, of which 26.5% had children under the age of 18 living in them. Of all households, 66.0% were married-couple households, 10.4% were households with a male householder and no spouse or partner present, and 20.3% were households with a female householder and no spouse or partner present. About 23.2% of all households were made up of individuals and 13.6% had someone living alone who was 65 years of age or older.

There were 1,780 housing units, of which 10.8% were vacant. Among occupied housing units, 90.2% were owner-occupied and 9.8% were renter-occupied. The homeowner vacancy rate was 3.7% and the rental vacancy rate was 23.3%.

Racial composition as of the 2020 census
Race	Percent
White	85.3%
Black or African American	0.3%
American Indian and Alaska Native	2.0%
Asian	2.7%
Native Hawaiian and Other Pacific Islander	0%
Some other race	0.6%
Two or more races	9.0%
Hispanic or Latino (of any race)	3.4%

In 2020, the median household income was $218,500 with a poverty rate of 3.6%.

=== 2010 census ===
As of the 2010 census, there were 3,710 people, 1,729 households, and 1,167 families residing in the city. The population density was 1,880.9 inhabitants per square mile (726.2/km^{2}). There were 1,858 housing units at an average density of 928.3 per square mile (358.4/km^{2}). The racial makeup of the city was 93.66% White, 0.42% African American, 1.38% Native American, 1.95% Asian, 0.59% from other races, and 2.00% from two or more races. Hispanic or Latino of any race were 1.36% of the population.

In 2010, the median income for a household in the city was $139,375 and the median income for a family was $197,917. The per capita income for the city was $138,658 ranking it first on Oklahoma locations by per capita income list. About 2.8% of families and 4.5% of the population were below the poverty line, including 1.7% of those under age 18 and 0.9% of those age 65 or over.

== Government ==
=== Local government ===
The city uses a council-manager government. Nichols Hills is divided into three wards of roughly equal population represented by a councilperson whom are elected to three year terms. Ward 1 is represented by Sody Clements, whom also serves as Vice-Mayor; Ward 2 by Peter Hoffman; and Ward 3 by Steve Goetzinger, whom serves as mayor. The office of mayor and vice mayor are rotated between the three councilmembers. The city manager is S. Shane Pate II, serving since 2016.

The proposed city budget for 2019–2020 was $11,877,474.

=== State and federal representation ===
Oklahoma House of Representatives
District	Name	Party	Took office
83	Eric Roberts	Republican	2021
85	Cyndi Munson	Democratic	2015

Oklahoma Senate
District	Name	Party	Took office
40	Carri Hicks	Democratic	2018

Congressional
District	Name	Party	Took office
OK-05	Stephanie Bice	Republican	2021

== Education ==
=== Primary and secondary schools ===
Nichols Hills is zoned to Oklahoma City Public Schools. Its zoned public schools are: Nichols Hills Elementary School, John Marshall Middle School in Oklahoma City, and John Marshall High School in Oklahoma City.

It is also located near the Oklahoma City private schools Casady School, Heritage Hall School, and Bishop McGuinness Catholic High School.

=== Library ===
Nichols Hills is part of the Metropolitan Library System and is served by The Village Library located in The Village.

== Notable residents ==
- Clayton Bennett (born 1959), businessman and co-owner of the Oklahoma City Thunder.
- Mark Daigneault (born 1985), head coach of the Oklahoma City Thunder.
- Shai Gilgeous-Alexander (born 1998), point guard for the Oklahoma City Thunder and NBA Most Valuable Player 2025 and 2026 recipient.
- Frank Keating (born 1944), 25th governor of Oklahoma.
- Tom Love (1937–2023), billionaire and owner, founder, and executive chairman of Love's.
- Anthony Kim (born 1985), professional golfer.
- Aubrey McClendon (1959–2016), founder and CEO of American Energy Partners, LP, co-founder and former CEO of Chesapeake Energy, and co-owner of the Oklahoma City Thunder.
- Andrew Rice (born 1973), former Democratic state senator, represented Senate District 46 from 2006-2012.
