= Terrill Davis =

American football player (born 2003)

Profile
- Position: Wide receiver

Personal information
- Born: August 11, 2003 (age 23)
- Listed height: 6 ft 0 in (1.83 m)
- Listed weight: 195 lb (88 kg)

Career information
- High school: Choctaw (Choctaw, Oklahoma)
- College: Central Oklahoma (2021–2024); Oklahoma State (2025)
- NFL draft: 2026: undrafted

Career history
- Minnesota Vikings (2026)*
- * Offseason or practice squad member only

Awards and highlights
- First-team All-MIAA (2024)

Terrill Davis (born August 11, 2003) is an American football wide receiver. He played college football for the Central Oklahoma Bronchos and for the Oklahoma State Cowboys.

== Early life ==
Davis attended Choctaw High School in Choctaw, Oklahoma. During his first three years of high school, he was a basketball star, not joining the football team until his senior year. Davis committed to play college football for the Central Oklahoma Bronchos.

== College career ==
=== Central Oklahoma ===
As a freshman in 2021, Davis was redshirted. In 2022, Davis played in eight games with three starts, hauling in 12 receptions for 141 yards. In 2023, he posted 43 receptions for 578 yards and four touchdowns. In 2024, Davis hauled in 109 passes for 1,609 yards and 15 touchdowns, where he earned UCO All-American honors. After the conclusion of the season, he entered the NCAA transfer portal.

=== Oklahoma State ===
Davis transferred to play for the Oklahoma State Cowboys. In week 12 of the 2025 season, he hauled in five passes for 78 yards in a loss against Kansas State. Davis finished the 2025 season, hauling in 29 passes for 373 yards. After the conclusion of the season, he declared for the NFL draft.

== Professional career ==
Pre-draft measurables
| Height | Weight | Arm length | Hand span | Wingspan | 40-yard dash | 10-yard split | 20-yard split | 20-yard shuttle | Three-cone drill | Vertical jump | Broad jump | Bench press |
|---|---|---|---|---|---|---|---|---|---|---|---|---|
| 5 ft 10 7/8 in (1.80 m) | 195 lb (88 kg) | 29 in (0.74 m) | 8 3/8 in (0.21 m) | 5 ft 11 1/4 in (1.81 m) | 4.65 s | 1.59 s | 2.75 s | 4.37 s | 7.05 s | 39.0 in (0.99 m) | 10 ft 4 in (3.15 m) | 16 reps |
All values from Pro Day

After not being selected in the 2026 NFL draft, Davis signed with the Minnesota Vikings as an undrafted free agent. On August 30, 2026, he was waived by the Vikings as a part of the final roster cuts.
