= Andrew Mitchell (American football) =

American football player (born 1985)

Tampa Bay Buccaneers
- Title: Assistant offensive line coach

Personal information
- Born: June 12, 1985 (age 41); Choctaw, Oklahoma, U.S.
- Listed height: 6 ft 5 in (1.96 m)
- Listed weight: 308 lb (140 kg)

Career information
- High school: Choctaw (OK)
- College: Snow (2006–2007); Oklahoma State (2008–2009)
- NFL draft: 2010: undrafted

Career history

Playing
- Cincinnati Bengals (2010); Seattle Seahawks (2012)*; Jacksonville Jaguars (2012)*
- * Offseason or practice squad member only

Coaching
- Houston (2013) Graduate assistant; North Carolina (2014–2015) Graduate assistant; TCU (2016) Assistant offensive line & tight ends coach; Indiana State (2016) Offensive line coach; Snow (2017–2018) Offensive coordinator; Snow (2019–2020) Head coach; TCU (2021) Offensive analyst; New Mexico State (2022–2023) Offensive line coach; New Mexico State (2024) Offensive line coach & assistant head coach; Oklahoma State (2025) Offensive line coach; Tampa Bay Buccaneers (2026-present) Assistant offensive line coach

Andrew Mitchell (born June 12, 1985) is an American football coach former offensive tackle. He played college football at Oklahoma State University. He was signed by the Cincinnati Bengals on April 30, 2010

He has also been a member of the Seattle Seahawks and Jacksonville Jaguars. Mitchell is a member of The Church of Jesus Christ of Latter-day Saints and served an LDS mission in California.

== Career ==
On February 17, 2026, the Tampa Bay Buccaneers hired Mitchell to serve as the team's assistant offensive line coach under head coach Todd Bowles.
