= Sibyl Dunn Warden =

- Born: Sibyl Dunn circa. 1870; Kansas, United States
- Died: October 31, 1924; Oklahoma City, Oklahoma, United States
- Known for: Pioneer woman publisher in Oklahoma
- Spouse: Sidney Ray Warden (m. 1906)

Sibyl Dunn Warden (1870 – October 31, 1924) was an American author, editor, and educator who was active in Oklahoma.

== Biography ==
Sibyl Dunn Warden was born in 1870 in Kansas to Thomas A. Dunn and Mary Dunn. She later moved to Oklahoma City and was a teacher for Oklahoma City Public Schools and Epworth University. She married Sidney Ray Warden in 1906 and the couple founded the Warden Printing Company. Warden served as the secretary-treasurer, while her husband was the company president. She edited the Oklahoma School Herald and wrote the books An Elementary History of the United States and Celebration Days: A Collection of Exercises Suited to the Celebration of Our National Holidays. She died from influenza on October 31, 1924, in Oklahoma City and was buried in Rose Hill Cemetery.
