= The Village, Oklahoma =

- City
- City of The Village
- Seal
- Motto: "Shop The Village"
- Location in Oklahoma County and the state of Oklahoma.
- Coordinates: 35°34′14″N 97°33′24″W
- Country: United States
- State: Oklahoma
- County: Oklahoma

Area
  - Total: 2.56 sq mi (6.62 km^{2})
  - Land: 2.55 sq mi (6.60 km^{2})
  - Water: 0.0077 sq mi (0.02 km^{2})
- Elevation: 1,191 ft (363 m)

Population (2020)
  - Total: 9,538
  - Density: 3,744.0/sq mi (1,445.56/km^{2})
- Time zone: UTC-6 (Central (CST))
  - Summer (DST): UTC-5 (CDT)
- Postal code: 73120
- FIPS code: 40-73250
- GNIS feature ID: 2412060
- Website: www.thevillageok.gov

The Village is a city in Oklahoma County, Oklahoma, United States, and a part of the Oklahoma City metropolitan area. The population was 9,538 at the 2020 Census.

The Village is a city almost enclaved by Oklahoma City, as it borders Nichols Hills. The Village is home to the corporate headquarters of Love's Travel Stops & Country Stores, the OKC Friday community newspaper, and Casady School.

The Village has a City Manager form of government. The City Manager is overseen by an elected Council. The position of Mayor rotates among the Council members.

The Village is represented in Congress by Stephanie Bice, in the Oklahoma Senate by Carri Hicks, and in the Oklahoma House by Cyndi Munson.

== Geography ==
According to the United States Census Bureau, the city has a total area of 2.5 square miles (6.5 km^{2}), of which 2.5 square miles (6.5 km^{2}) is land and 0.39% is water. Oklahoma City surrounds the borders of The Village.

== Demographics ==
Historical population
Census	Pop.	Note	%±
1960	12,118		—
1970	13,695		13.0%
1980	11,114		−18.8%
1990	10,353		−6.8%
2000	10,157		−1.9%
2010	8,929		−12.1%
2020	9,538		6.8%
U.S. Decennial Census

=== 2020 census ===
As of the 2020 census, The Village had a population of 9,538. The median age was 37.9 years. 14.9% of residents were under the age of 18 and 20.9% of residents were 65 years of age or older. For every 100 females there were 84.0 males, and for every 100 females age 18 and over there were 81.4 males age 18 and over.

100.0% of residents lived in urban areas, while 0% lived in rural areas.

There were 4,831 households in The Village, of which 19.9% had children under the age of 18 living in them. Of all households, 33.7% were married-couple households, 20.6% were households with a male householder and no spouse or partner present, and 37.3% were households with a female householder and no spouse or partner present. About 40.7% of all households were made up of individuals and 16.5% had someone living alone who was 65 years of age or older.

There were 5,230 housing units, of which 7.6% were vacant. Among occupied housing units, 61.8% were owner-occupied and 38.2% were renter-occupied. The homeowner vacancy rate was 2.5% and the rental vacancy rate was 9.2%.

Racial composition as of the 2020 census
Race	Percent
White	71.5%
Black or African American	9.0%
American Indian and Alaska Native	2.7%
Asian	2.3%
Native Hawaiian and Other Pacific Islander	0.1%
Some other race	2.9%
Two or more races	11.6%
Hispanic or Latino (of any race)	8.0%

=== 2000 census ===
At the 2000 census there were 10,157 people in 4,778 households, including 2,823 families, in the city. The population density was 3,999.8 inhabitants per square mile (1,544.3/km^{2}). There were 4,997 housing units at an average density of 1,967.8 per square mile (759.8/km^{2}). The racial makeup of the city was 80.19% White, 10.47% African American, 2.54% Native American, 1.91% Asian, 0.03% Pacific Islander, 1.13% from other races, and 3.73% from two or more races. Hispanic or Latino of any race were 3.77%.

Of the 4,778 households 24.2% had children under the age of 18 living with them, 42.8% were married couples living together, 10.9% had a female householder with no husband present, and 43.0% were non-families. 35.2% of households were one person and 12.1% were one person aged 65 or older. The average household size was 2.12 and the average family size was 2.76.

The age distribution was 20.2% under the age of 18, 10.2% from 18 to 24, 34.4% from 25 to 44, 18.9% from 45 to 64, and 16.3% 65 or older. The median age was 35 years. For every 100 females, there were 86.8 males. For every 100 females age 18 and over, there were 84.1 males.

The median household income was $37,559 and the median family income was $44,632. Males had a median income of $32,204 versus $24,896 for females. The per capita income for the city was $20,444. About 7.2% of families and 10.1% of the population were below the poverty line, including 13.3% of those under age 18 and 7.9% of those age 65 or over.

== Shopping ==
Local Shopping:

- Village Park South
- Village Park North
- North Park Mall
- French Market Mall
- Casady Square Shopping Center

== Education ==
It is in Oklahoma City Public Schools. Most of The Village is zoned to Ridgeview Elementary School, while a portion is zoned to Stanley Hupfeld Academy at Western Village (previously Western Village Charter Elementary School). All residents are zoned to John Marshall Middle School in Oklahoma City, and John Marshall High School in Oklahoma City.

Metropolitan Library System operates The Village Library. Though the original location was in the Casady Square Shopping Center starting in 1966, a new, standalone library opened in 1990 and received a renovation in 2019.

== Notable people ==
- Talor Gooch (1991- ), professional golfer.
