= Brandon Durham =

American street basketball player

Personal information
- Nickname: The Assassin
- Nationality: (United States) American
- Born: Oklahoma City, Oklahoma, United States
- Height: 6 ft 0 in (1.83 m)
- Weight: 170 lb (77 kg)

Sport
- Sport: Basketball
- Event: Streetball
- College team: Southern Nazarene

Brandon Durham, better known by his nickname "The Assassin", is an American streetball player from Oklahoma City, Oklahoma. Durham played for John Marshall High School although he is best known for his appearance on the ESPN television show "Street Ball – The AND1 Mixtape Tour". Durham is 6-0" tall, weighs 170 pounds and plays the point guard position. In the 2005 season of the AND1 Mixtape Tour, Durham competed at the Oklahoma City open run and performed well enough to play in the main game later in the evening. Durham also appears as a character in the AND1 Streetball video game. Durham was offered the opportunity to play for the AND1 team but he rejected it, saying his education was more important than basketball. Durham instead chose to play at Southern Nazarene University in Bethany, Oklahoma.

== See also ==
- 2008 NAIA Division I men's basketball tournament
- Southern Nazarene Crimson Storm
