= Valley Brook, Oklahoma =

- Town
- Location in Oklahoma County and the state of Oklahoma.
- Coordinates: 35°24′10″N 97°28′53″W
- Country: United States
- State: Oklahoma
- County: Oklahoma

Area
  - Total: 0.26 sq mi (0.68 km^{2})
  - Land: 0.26 sq mi (0.68 km^{2})
  - Water: 0 sq mi (0.00 km^{2})
- Elevation: 1,266 ft (386 m)

Population (2020)
  - Total: 665
  - Density: 2,543/sq mi (981.7/km^{2})
- Time zone: UTC-6 (Central (CST))
  - Summer (DST): UTC-5 (CDT)
- FIPS code: 40-76500
- GNIS feature ID: 2413418

Valley Brook is a town in Oklahoma County, Oklahoma, United States, and is part of the Oklahoma City Metropolitan Area. As of the 2020 census, Valley Brook had a population of 665.

== History ==
The origins of Valley Brook were in oil exploration and extraction from the Oklahoma City Field of the 1930s, with the first residence in the town being "oil-camp housing" for workers.

== Geography ==
According to the United States Census Bureau, the town has a total area of 0.3 square miles (0.78 km^{2}), all land.

== Demographics ==
Historical population
Census	Pop.	Note	%±
1960	1,378		—
1970	1,197		−13.1%
1980	923		−22.9%
1990	744		−19.4%
2000	1,375		84.8%
2010	765		−44.4%
2020	665		−13.1%
U.S. Decennial Census

=== 2020 census ===
As of the 2020 census, Valley Brook had a population of 665. The median age was 36.6 years. 23.8% of residents were under the age of 18 and 12.9% of residents were 65 years of age or older. For every 100 females there were 107.8 males, and for every 100 females age 18 and over there were 120.4 males age 18 and over.

100.0% of residents lived in urban areas, while 0.0% lived in rural areas.

There were 259 households in Valley Brook, of which 33.6% had children under the age of 18 living in them. Of all households, 29.7% were married-couple households, 35.1% were households with a male householder and no spouse or partner present, and 23.6% were households with a female householder and no spouse or partner present. About 27.8% of all households were made up of individuals and 10.0% had someone living alone who was 65 years of age or older.

There were 329 housing units, of which 21.3% were vacant. The homeowner vacancy rate was 0.0% and the rental vacancy rate was 16.9%.

Racial composition as of the 2020 census
Race	Number	Percent
White	413	62.1%
Black or African American	26	3.9%
American Indian and Alaska Native	48	7.2%
Asian	12	1.8%
Native Hawaiian and Other Pacific Islander	0	0.0%
Some other race	51	7.7%
Two or more races	115	17.3%
Hispanic or Latino (of any race)	139	20.9%

=== 2000 census ===
As of the census of 2000, there were 817 people, 298 households, and 204 families residing in the town. The population density was 3,037.6 inhabitants per square mile (1,172.8/km^{2}). There were 337 housing units at an average density of 1,253.0 per square mile (483.8/km^{2}). The racial makeup of the town was 77.48% White, 4.41% African American, 7.83% Native American, 0.37% Asian, 1.96% from other races, and 7.96% from two or more races. Hispanic or Latino of any race were 8.20% of the population.

There were 298 households, of which 35.6% had children under the age of 18 living with them, 45.0% were married couples living together, 15.8% had a female householder with no husband present, and 31.5% were non-families. 26.2% of all households were made up of individuals, and 8.7% had someone living alone who was 65 years of age or older. The average household size was 2.74 and the average family size was 3.25.

In the town, the population was spread out, with 30.6% under the age of 18, 10.5% from 18 to 24, 31.1% from 25 to 44, 19.1% from 45 to 64, and 8.7% who were 65 years of age or older. The median age was 30 years. For every 100 females, there were 98.3 males. For every 100 females age 18 and over, there were 98.3 males.

The median income for a household in the town was $21,193, and the median income for a family was $23,565. Males had a median income of $21,071 versus $17,569 for females. The per capita income for the town was $9,316. About 20.3% of families and 25.2% of the population were below the poverty line, including 31.9% of those under age 18 and 19.7% of those age 65 or over.

== Education ==
It is in Oklahoma City Public Schools. Zoned schools are: Bodine Elementary School, Webster Middle School, and Capitol Hill High School.

== Revenues ==
As of 2021 Valley Brook collects a majority of its city revenue from its police force through traffic violations.

Valley Brook City Revenue (FY2013)
Category	Total ($)
Court fines/forfeitures	$727,684
Sales Tax	$101,208
Licenses/permits	$39,061
Franchise tax	$25,774
Motor vehicle	$5,027
