= John Marshall High School (Oklahoma) =

Location
- 12201 North Portland Avenue; Oklahoma City, Oklahoma 73120-4647; United States; 35°35′49.54″N 97°35′39.42″W

Information
- Opened: 2005 (2nd location)
- Closed: Original building/school was an all years school. Later the original building of JMHS became a 9-12 year school. Currently JMHS has relocated to an entirely new campus and new building.
- School district: Oklahoma City Public Schools
- CEEB code: 372670
- Principal: Rachelle' Conner
- Teaching staff: 58.14 (FTE)
- Grades: 9-12
- Enrollment: 863 (2023-2024)
- Student to teacher ratio: 14.84
- Colors: Red and blue
- Team name: Bears
- Newspaper: BearTracks
- Yearbook: Gavel
- Website: jmehs.okcps.org

John Marshall High School is a public high school in Oklahoma City, Oklahoma, United States. Its original location opened in 1950 at 9017 N University Avenue. The new location opened in 2005 at 12201 North Portland Avenue.

The school is named in honor of the 4th chief justice of the United States (1755–1835), John Marshall, the longest working chief justice in Supreme Court history.

In addition to portions of Oklahoma City, the school's attendance boundary includes Nichols Hills and The Village.

== History ==
Originally opening in far North Oklahoma City 1950, John Marshall served as a high school for The Village, Britton, Quail Creek, The Greens, Val Verde and Nichols Hills. The boundaries changed several times over the years. In 2005, the students were split between the original campus and the new campus. For one semester, the Oklahoma City Public Schools changed the name of the original location to Centennial High School in an attempt to use the original location as an alternative to the closed Gateway Academy. This did not work out, and the remaining students were transferred to the new location. The original location was finally fully closed in 2006.

The abandoned John Marshall and its 20 acres of land are located blocks from the incorporated community of Nichols Hills, Oklahoma Oklahoma City's historically upscale area for large, expensive homes. The school site originally reported selling for $3 million to Pastor Eddie Baker and his nonprofit Golden Hills Ranch to use as a school for at-risk children aged 10 to 18. However, that deal was never completed.

In 2013, Oklahoma City developer Richard Tanenbaum of Gardener Tanenbaum Group paid the Oklahoma City School Board $400,000 for the property. Demolition of the 220,000-square-foot school began in January 2015, with Tanenbaum planning to build an upscale 270-unit apartment complex on the site.

== Athletics ==
The high school won the 1995 Class 5A State Championship, beating MacArthur (Lawton) High School 21–7.

== Notable alumni ==
- R. Wayne Baughman, Class of 1959, three-time member of US Olympic Greco-Roman wrestling teams; head wrestling coach of US Air Force Academy for 27 years
- Brandon Durham, street basketball player known as "The Assassin" on the AND1 Mixtape Tour
- J. R. Giddens, Class of 2003, NBA professional basketball player, drafted in the 1st round, NBA debut: Boston Celtics, 2009–2010 following with the New York Knicks, 2010
- Julius Jones, prisoner and former death row inmate
- Tracy Moore, Class of 1983, NBA professional basketball player, NBA debut: January 24, 1992 with the Dallas Mavericks 1992–1993, following with the Detroit Pistons 1994, and the Houston Rockets 1996–1997
- Jay Patrick Murray, Class of 1977, retired U.S. Army colonel, candidate for 2012 seat of United States House of Representatives from Virginia's 8th congressional district, ran for the same seat in 2010
- Steve Pickett, Class of 1979, recipient of Dallas Press Club Award for coverage of Hurricane Katrina, recipient of Emmy Award for coverage of War in Iraq, in-person reporter for the Haiti hurricane disaster and the 2013 Moore, OK tornado destruction, reporter-anchor at KTVT-TV in the N. Texas for the Dallas-Fort Worth region
- Antonio Smith, NFL professional football player, drafted in 2004–2008, NFL draft by the Arizona Cardinals, NFC championship 2008, Houston Texans 2009–2013, signed as an unrestricted free agent by the Houston Texans 2011, added to the AFC's Pro Bowl 2011
- Suhaib Webb, contemporary Islamic scholar
- Wayne Wells, Class of 1964, 1972 Olympic gold medalist in freestyle wrestling
