= Choctaw-Nicoma Park School District =

School district in Oklahoma

The Choctaw-Nicoma Park School District is the 19th largest school district in Oklahoma with an enrollment of around 5,800 as of 2019–20, including elementary through high school students at nine sites.

Choctaw-Nicoma Park is a public school district covering about 60 square miles (160 km^{2}) located in eastern Oklahoma County. The district includes the majority of Choctaw as well as most of Nicoma Park and portions of Harrah, Midwest City, and Oklahoma City.

== Schools ==
=== 2009 Bond Issue ===
In November 2008, Choctaw-Nicoma Park voters passed a 54 million dollar bond issue to provide funding for two new schools. The two new schools were Choctaw Middle School and Nicoma Park Elementary which were completed by the 2011–2012 school year.

=== Elementary schools ===
- Griffith Meridian Elementary, grades PreK-5
- Choctaw Elementary, grades PreK-5
- Westfall Elementary, grades PreK-5
- Heartland Elementary School, grades PreK-5
- Nicoma Park Elementary, grades Prek-2

=== Middle schools ===
- Choctaw Middle School, grades 6–8
- Nicoma Park Middle School, grades 6–8

=== High school ===
- Choctaw High School, grades 9–12, Enrollment: 1675 students

=== Choctaw Middle School ===
- Choctaw Middle School was constructed for 800 students and currently has an enrollment of about 700 students.

=== Nicoma Park Middle School ===
- Nicoma Park Middle School has an enrollment of over 600 students.
