= Heritage Park Mall =

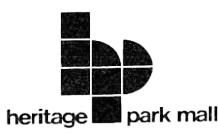

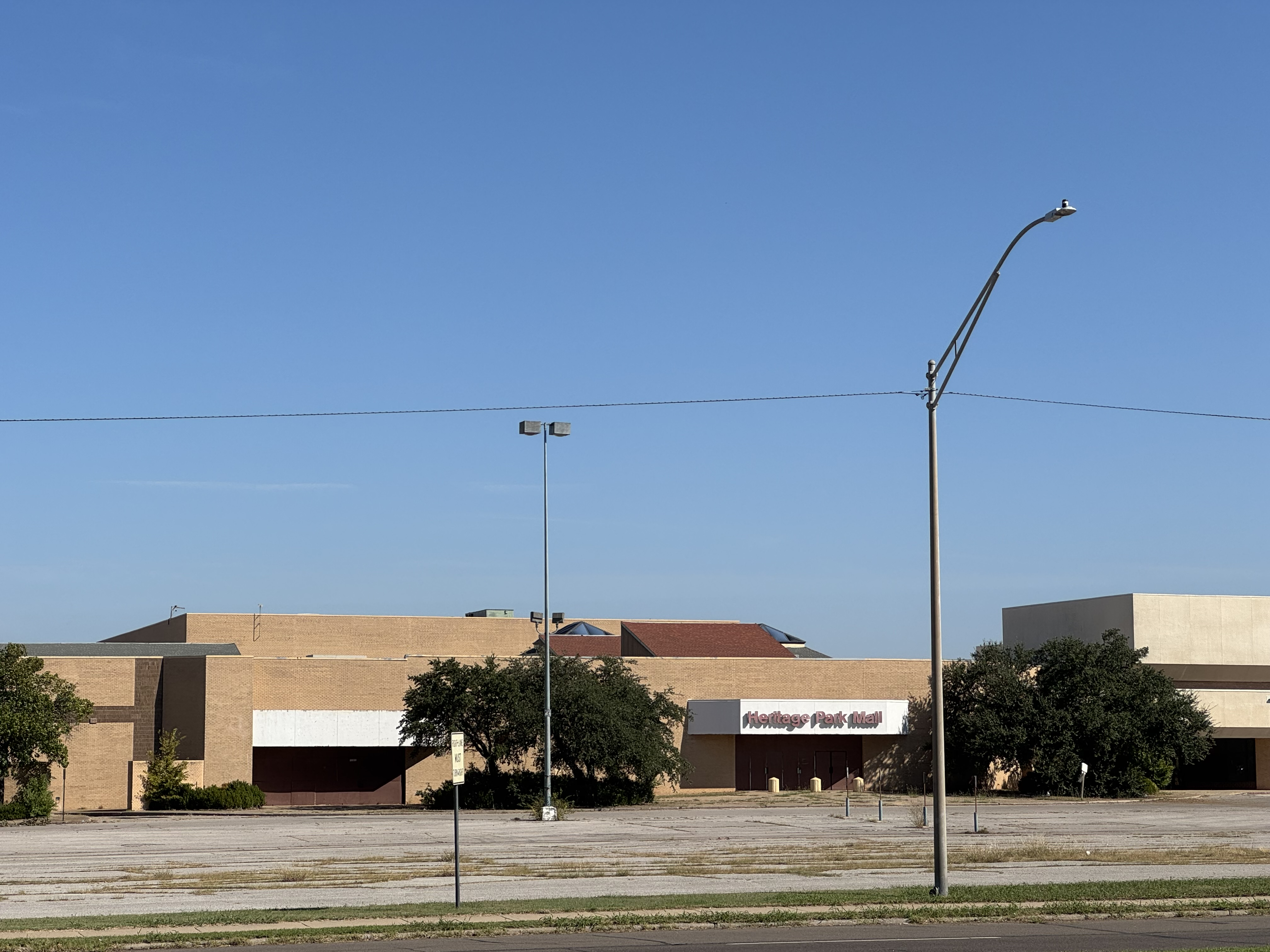
- The Abandoned Heritage Park Mall in September, 2025.
- Location: Midwest City, Oklahoma, United States
- Coordinates: 35.4658°N 97.4099°W
- Address: 6609 E Reno Ave
- Opened: October 9, 1978; 48 years ago
- Closed: February 15, 2010; 16 years ago
- Developer: Melvin Simon Associates
- Owner: The City Of Midwest City
- Num. of stores: 0 (at least 80 at its peak)
- Num. of anchor tenants: 4 (1 open, 3 vacant)
- Floor area: 650,000 square feet (60,387.0 m^{2})
- Floors: 1

Heritage Park Mall was a shopping mall in Midwest City, Oklahoma, United States, that opened in 1978 and closed in 2010. The property sits on about 39 acres, and during its time of operation was the only enclosed shopping mall in Midwest City, although there are many outdoor shopping centers.

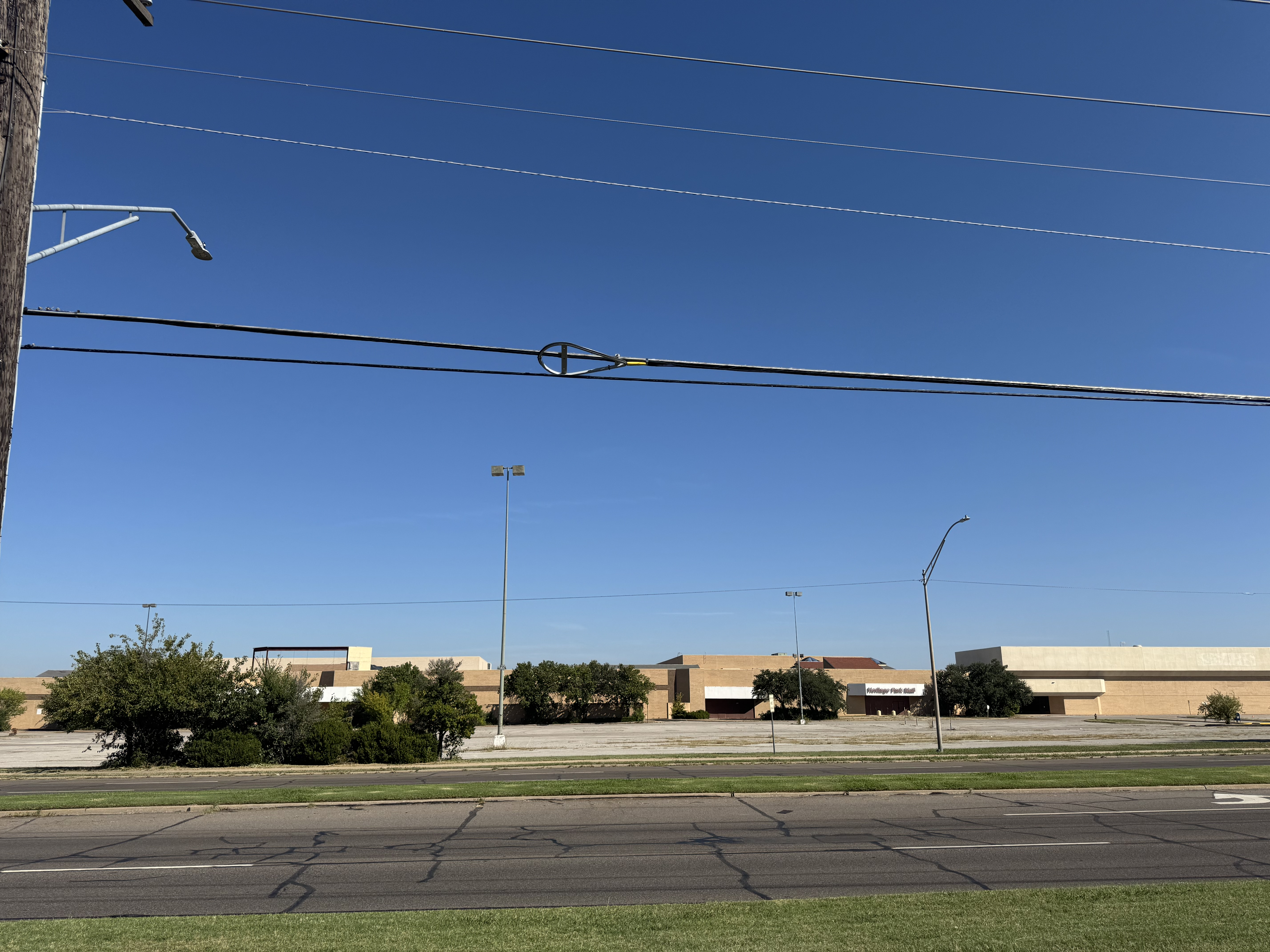
Heritage Park Mall in OKC in 2025

== History ==
Heritage Park Mall first opened in fall 1978, with Dillard's, Montgomery Ward, Sears and H. J. Wilson Co. as anchors. The opening day celebrations included appearances by Billy Carter, Ed McMahon of The Tonight Show, soccer star Kyle Rote Jr. and Olympic runner Jim Ryun. In 1999, Montgomery Ward and the Service Merchandise that moved into the former Wilson's location closed. In March 2006, Dillard's closed their location at the mall, leaving Sears the sole anchor. LifeChurch purchased the 102,000 square foot Dillard's for a discounted $1.5 million in 2011, making it the sixth Oklahoma City area campus. After being for sale since May 2009, the owner of Heritage Park Mall announced the property would close February 15, 2010, leaving a handful of stores to close. The mall's owner Daniel Rafalian purchased the mall for $7.2 million in 2005, but was asking $3.75 million. At the time, the mall accounted for 51% of retail vacancy in east Oklahoma County. In July 2011, the 232,000 square foot inline section of the mall sold to Ahmad Bahreini for a discounted $1.3 million. In summer 2017, it was announced that Sears would close its location, leaving LifeChurch as the sole anchor. The store closed in October.
