= Steve Pickett =

American journalist

- Born: circa 1961 (age 63–64)

Steve Pickett (born c. 1961) is an American broadcast journalist, recipient of the Dallas Press Club Award for coverage of Hurricane Katrina, and of Emmy Award for coverage of War in Iraq.

== Biography ==
Steve Pickett graduated from John Marshall High School in 1979. He was a news reporter at NBC affiliate television station KGW serving the Portland, Oregon metropolitan area, and now is reporter-anchorman at CBS owned-and-operated television station KTVT licensed to Fort Worth, Texas, and serving the Dallas-Fort Worth designated market area. Pickett was the recipient of the Dallas Press Club Award for coverage of Hurricane Katrina, and of Emmy Award for coverage of War in Iraq, and has also received professional recognition from the National Association of Black Journalists, the Institute for Educational Inquiry for coverage of public education in the United States, the Poynter Institute, and the University of Oklahoma Black Alumni Society.
