= Star Spencer High School =

High school in Oklahoma, United States

Coordinates: 35.506239°N 97.378693°W

Star Spencer High School is located in Spencer, Oklahoma, United States. Star Spencer is part of the Oklahoma City Public Schools. The school's athletic teams are known as the Bobcats.

The school's boundary includes Spencer and parts of Choctaw, Midwest City, Nicoma Park, and Oklahoma City.

== History ==
In 1901 a group of people from Spencer County, Indiana relocated in Oklahoma. They built an elevator and mill, a grocery store, and later a hardware store. They named their new town Spencer for their old home and eventually called their school Spencer as well. Star School (in a nearby area) was named by Henry Dodd in honor of a school in Kansas where he had lived previously. Two schools merged to become Star Spencer in 1956.

The football stadium (Carl Twidwell Stadium) was named after Carl Twidwell, athletic director, football coach, and vice principal.

== Programs ==
All graduates of Star Spencer High School who have a cumulative GPA of 2.5 or higher may receive free tuition and mandatory fees if they attend Rose State College, a community college in Midwest City; this initiative is through the Ticket to Rose program.
