= Oklahoma County, Oklahoma =

County in Oklahoma, United States

- County
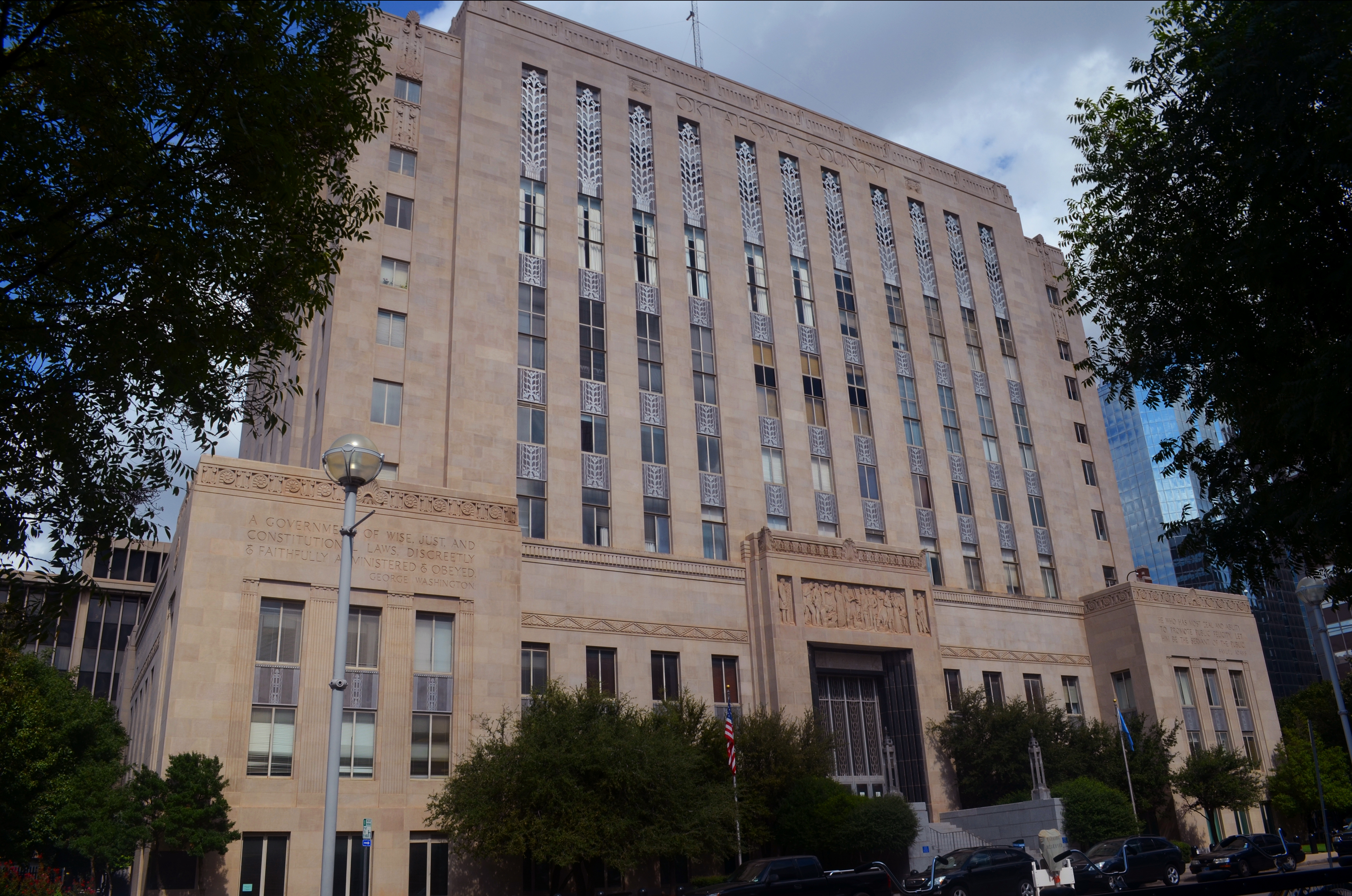
- Oklahoma County Courthouse

- Seal

- Location within the U.S. state of Oklahoma
- Coordinates: 35°29′N 97°32′W
- Country: United States
- State: Oklahoma
- Founded: 1890
- Seat: Oklahoma City
- Largest city: Oklahoma City

Area
  - Total: 718 sq mi (1,860 km^{2})
  - Land: 708.82 sq mi (1,835.8 km^{2})
  - Water: 9.6 sq mi (25 km^{2}) 1.3%

Population (2020)
  - Total: 796,292
  - Estimate (2025): 822,125 ▲
  - Density: 1,123.4/sq mi (433.75/km^{2})
- Time zone: UTC−6 (Central)
  - Summer (DST): UTC−5 (CDT)
- Congressional districts: 3rd, 4th, 5th
- Website: oklahomacounty.org

Oklahoma County is a county located in the central part of the U.S. state of Oklahoma. As of the 2020 census, the population was 796,292, making it the most populous county in Oklahoma. The county seat is Oklahoma City, the state capital and largest city. Oklahoma County is at the heart of the Oklahoma City metropolitan statistical area. Oklahoma County is one of seven counties in the United States to share the same name as the state it is located in (the other six being Arkansas County, Hawaii County, Idaho County, Iowa County, New York County (Manhattan), and Utah County), and the only one of the seven to contain the state capital, and one of two to contain a city of the same name as well.

== History ==
The area that would someday be called Oklahoma County was originally inhabited by members of the indigenous nations of the Southern Plains, but by the 1830s the land would become part of the territory assigned to the Seminoles and Creeks after their removal from their ancestral lands in the Southeastern USA.

As a result of the Reconstruction era treaties signed between the US government and the Seminole and Creek nations in 1866, the land was taken from tribal jurisdiction but not assigned to other tribal governments, which in time led it to be called the Unassigned Lands. In 1889, the US federal government held a land run for the Unassigned lands, which led to the rapid settlement of the area.

By 1890, Oklahoma County was called "County Two" and was one of seven counties established by the Organic Act of 1890.

County business initially took place in a building at the intersection of California Avenue and Robinson Street until the construction of the first Oklahoma County Courthouse at 520 West Main Street in the 1900s. In 1937, the county government was moved to a building at 321 Park Avenue, which now serves only as the county courthouse.

== Geography ==
According to the United States Census Bureau, the county has a total area of 718 square miles (1,860 km^{2}), of which 709 square miles (1,840 km^{2}) is land and 9.6 square miles (25 km^{2}) (1.3%) is water.

=== Transit ===
- Embark
- Oklahoma City Streetcar
- Flixbus
- Greyhound Lines
- Amtrak (Heartland Flyer) at Oklahoma City station

=== Major highways ===
- I-35
- I-40 / US 270
- I-44
- I-235
- I-240
- I-335 / Kickapoo Turnpike
- I-344 / Kilpatrick Turnpike
- US 62
- US 77
- Turner Turnpike
- SH-3
- SH-3A
- SH-66
- SH-74
- SH-77H
- SH-152
- SH-270

=== Adjacent counties ===
- Logan County (north)
- Lincoln County (east)
- Pottawatomie County (southeast)
- Cleveland County (south)
- Canadian County (west)
- Kingfisher County (northwest)

=== National protected area ===
- Oklahoma City National Memorial

== Demographics ==
Historical population
Census	Pop.	Note	%±
1890	11,742		—
1900	25,915		120.7%
1910	85,232		228.9%
1920	116,307		36.5%
1930	221,738		90.6%
1940	244,159		10.1%
1950	325,352		33.3%
1960	439,506		35.1%
1970	526,805		19.9%
1980	568,933		8.0%
1990	599,611		5.4%
2000	660,448		10.1%
2010	718,633		8.8%
2020	796,292		10.8%
2025 (est.)	822,125	▲	3.2%
U.S. Decennial Census; 1790-1960 1900-1990; 1990-2000 2010

=== 2021 estimates ===
The Census Bureau estimated the county's population at 802,559 in 2022, while 2017–2021 American Community Survey estimates reported that 54.5% of residents were non-Hispanic white, 15.8% Black or African American, 4.7% Asian, 0.1% Pacific Islander, 5.8% multiracial, and 18.5% Hispanic or Latino of any race; 10.2% of residents were foreign-born during the same period. During 2017–2021 there were 313,822 households with an average of 2.48 people per household, the median value of an owner-occupied housing unit was $164,000, and the median gross rent was $929. The median household income was $58,239 with a per capita income of $34,129, and 16.3% of residents lived at or below the poverty line.

=== 2020 census ===
As of the 2020 census, the county had a population of 796,292. Of the residents, 24.4% were under the age of 18 and 14.5% were 65 years of age or older; the median age was 35.4 years. For every 100 females there were 96.1 males, and for every 100 females age 18 and over there were 93.2 males.

The racial makeup of the county was 54.9% White, 15.1% Black or African American, 3.4% American Indian and Alaska Native, 3.5% Asian, 10.0% from some other race, and 12.9% from two or more races. Hispanic or Latino residents of any race comprised 19.3% of the population.

There were 317,334 households in the county, of which 31.2% had children under the age of 18 living with them and 30.3% had a female householder with no spouse or partner present. About 31.0% of all households were made up of individuals and 10.5% had someone living alone who was 65 years of age or older.

There were 352,544 housing units, of which 10.0% were vacant. Among occupied housing units, 56.5% were owner-occupied and 43.5% were renter-occupied. The homeowner vacancy rate was 1.8% and the rental vacancy rate was 11.7%.

=== 2010 census ===
According to the 2010 U.S. census, there were 718,633 people, 277,615 households, and 172,572 families residing in the county. The population density was 1,013 inhabitants per square mile (391/km^{2}). There were 319,828 housing units at an average density of 416 units per square mile (161 units/km^{2}). The racial makeup of the county was 64.6% White, 15.4% Black or African American, 3.5% Native American, 3% Asian, 0.1% Pacific Islander, 8.1% from other races, and 5.3% from two or more races; 15.1% of the population were Hispanic or Latino of any race. Throughout its population, 12.4% were of German, 12.3% Mexican, 10.1% Irish, 7.9% English, and 7.7% American ancestries according to the 2010 census. 84.4% spoke English and 11.5% Spanish as their first language.

In 2010, there were 277,615 households, out of which 28.5% had children under the age of 18 living with them, 43.1% were married couples living together, 15.4% had a female householder with no husband present, and 37.8% were non-families. 31.9% of all households were made up of individuals, and 9.7% had someone living alone who was 65 years of age or older. The average household size was 2.56 and the average family size was 3.26.

In 2010, the median income for a household in the county was $42,916, and the median income for a family was $54,721. The per capita income for the county was $25,723. About 11.70% of families and 15.30% of the population were below the poverty line, including 21.70% of those under age 18 and 8.60% of those age 65 or over.

== Politics ==
Since the second half of the 20th century, Oklahoma County has been quite conservative for an urban county. It swung from a 20-point victory for Harry Truman in 1948 to a 15-point victory for Dwight Eisenhower in 1952. It has gone Republican in all but one presidential election since then; it narrowly voted for Lyndon Johnson in 1964. This mirrors the growing Republican trend in Oklahoma since the end of World War II. It was one of the few areas in the South where Jimmy Carter didn't do well.

In 1982, Oklahoma County elected the first Black county commissioner in Oklahoma, Shirley Ann Bruce Darrell.

However, the Republican share of votes for president has decreased in every election since the 2004 election (with the exception of 2024). In the 2022 Oklahoma gubernatorial election, Democratic candidate Joy Hofmeister received her largest vote share of any county, with 55.0% of the vote and a modest improvement over the 2018 Democratic candidate, Drew Edmonson. Incumbent Republican Governor Mary Fallin was the last member of her party to win the county with 51.3% in 2014. Also, in the 2018 United States House of Representatives elections in Oklahoma, Democrat Kendra Horn received 52.3% of the vote in Oklahoma County, which was the only county in the state to vote for a Democratic House candidate, thereby changing parties. Horn would carry the county again in her 2022 Senate run, becoming the first Democratic Senatorial candidate to carry the county since David Boren's 1990 landslide. In the 2020 United States Presidential election, Republican Donald Trump narrowly carried the county (1% margin), down from 10 points in 2016. It was also the best showing for a Democrat in the county since LBJ. In 2024, Trump won the county, but again by a narrow plurality. However, his margin of victory was slightly larger while receiving fewer votes than in 2020.

=== County commissioners ===
District	Name	Party	Took office
1	Jason Lowe	Democratic	2025
2	Brian Maughan	Republican	2009
3	Jennifer Mayo	Democratic	2026

=== County offices ===
Office	Name	Party	Took office
Assessor	John Gibbons	Democratic	2026
County Clerk	Maressa Treat	Republican	2023
Court Clerk	Rick Warren	Republican	2017
District Attorney	Vicki Behenna	Democratic	2023
Sheriff	Tommie Johnson III	Republican	2021
Treasurer	Jessica Thompson	Democratic	2026

=== Oklahoma House of Representatives ===
District	Name	Party	Took office
31	Collin Duel	Republican	2022
39	Erick Harris	Republican	2024
41	Denise Crosswhite Hader	Republican	2019
54	Kevin West	Republican	2016
82	Nicole Miller	Republican	2019
83	Eric Roberts	Republican	2020
84	Tammy West	Republican	2016
85	Cyndi Munson	Democratic	2015
87	Ellyn Hefner	Democratic	2022
88	Ellen Pogemiller	Democratic	2024
89	Arturo Alonso-Sandoval	Democratic	2022
90	Emily Gise	Republican	2024
92	Forrest Bennett	Democratic	2016
93	Mickey Dollens	Democratic	2016
94	Andy Fugate	Democratic	2019
95	Max Wolfley	Republican	2020
96	Preston Stinson	Republican	2020
97	Aletia Timmons	Democratic	2025
99	Ajay Pittman	Democratic	2019
100	Marilyn Stark	Republican	2019
101	Robert Manger	Republican	2019

=== Oklahoma Senate ===
District	Name	Party	Took office
15	Lisa Standridge	Republican	2024
17	Shane Jett	Republican	2020
22	Kristen Thompson	Republican	2022
30	Julia Kirt	Democratic	2018
40	Carri Hicks	Democratic	2018
41	Adam Pugh	Republican	2016
42	Brenda Stanley	Republican	2018
44	Michael Brooks-Jimenez	Democratic	2017
45	Paul Rosino	Republican	2017
46	Mark Mann	Democratic	2024
47	Kelly E. Hines	Republican	2024
48	Nikki Nice	Democratic	2024

=== Congressional ===
District	Name	Party	Took office
OK-3	Frank Lucas	Republican	1994
OK-4	Tom Cole	Republican	2003
OK-5	Stephanie Bice	Republican	2021

=== Party registration ===
Voter registration and party enrollment as of January 15, 2025
Party	Number of Voters	Percentage
Republican	197,346	41.44%
Democratic	161,443	33.91%
Libertarian	5,058	1.06%
Unaffiliated	112,275	23.58%
Total	476,122	100%

United States presidential election results for Oklahoma County, Oklahoma
Year	Republican		Democratic		Third party(ies)	
Year	No.	%	No.	%	No.	%
1908	5,401	50.03%	4,876	45.17%	518	4.80%
1912	5,706	42.02%	6,963	51.28%	910	6.70%
1916	5,291	36.33%	7,971	54.73%	1,302	8.94%
1920	15,350	44.68%	17,820	51.86%	1,189	3.46%
1924	17,504	40.63%	21,708	50.38%	3,873	8.99%
1928	36,608	69.13%	16,073	30.35%	272	0.51%
1932	21,238	34.05%	41,130	65.95%	0	0.00%
1936	24,312	32.15%	50,946	67.36%	373	0.49%
1940	35,639	39.77%	53,649	59.86%	329	0.37%
1944	42,464	42.30%	57,812	57.59%	116	0.12%
1948	40,161	40.11%	59,954	59.89%	0	0.00%
1952	95,492	57.63%	70,199	42.37%	0	0.00%
1956	85,395	59.76%	57,512	40.24%	0	0.00%
1960	102,992	61.44%	64,648	38.56%	0	0.00%
1964	83,660	48.00%	90,641	52.00%	0	0.00%
1968	93,212	49.73%	60,395	32.22%	33,834	18.05%
1972	156,437	75.24%	46,986	22.60%	4,502	2.17%
1976	119,120	56.69%	87,185	41.49%	3,808	1.81%
1980	139,538	66.05%	58,765	27.81%	12,970	6.14%
1984	159,974	71.65%	60,235	26.98%	3,052	1.37%
1988	135,376	63.59%	75,812	35.61%	1,703	0.80%
1992	126,788	48.78%	76,271	29.34%	56,864	21.88%
1996	120,429	54.68%	80,438	36.52%	19,386	8.80%
2000	139,078	62.34%	81,590	36.57%	2,443	1.09%
2004	174,741	64.23%	97,298	35.77%	0	0.00%
2008	163,172	58.41%	116,182	41.59%	0	0.00%
2012	149,728	58.33%	106,982	41.67%	0	0.00%
2016	141,569	51.68%	112,813	41.18%	19,560	7.14%
2020	145,050	49.21%	141,724	48.08%	7,966	2.70%
2024	143,618	49.71%	138,769	48.03%	6,536	2.26%

== Communities ==
=== Cities ===
- Bethany
- Choctaw
- Del City
- Edmond
- Harrah
- Midwest City
- Nichols Hills
- Nicoma Park
- Oklahoma City (county seat)
- Spencer
- The Village
- Warr Acres

=== Towns ===
- Arcadia
- Forest Park
- Jones
- Lake Aluma
- Luther
- Smith Village
- Valley Brook
- Woodlawn Park

=== Unincorporated communities ===
- Four Counties Corner (formerly Lockridge)
- Newalla
- Wheatland

== Education ==
School districts include:

K-12:

- Bethany Public Schools
- Choctaw/Nicoma Park Schools
- Crooked Oak Public Schools
- Deer Creek Public Schools
- Edmond Public Schools
- Harrah Public Schools
- Jones Public Schools
- Luther Public Schools
- McLoud Public Schools
- Midwest City-Del City Schools
- Millwood Public Schools
- Moore Public Schools
- Mustang Public Schools
- Oklahoma City Public Schools
- Piedmont Public Schools
- Putnam City Public Schools
- Western Heights Public Schools

Elementary only:

- Crutcho Public School
- Oakdale Public School

== See also ==
- List of counties in Oklahoma
- National Register of Historic Places listings in Oklahoma County, Oklahoma
