= Nicoma Park, Oklahoma =

- City
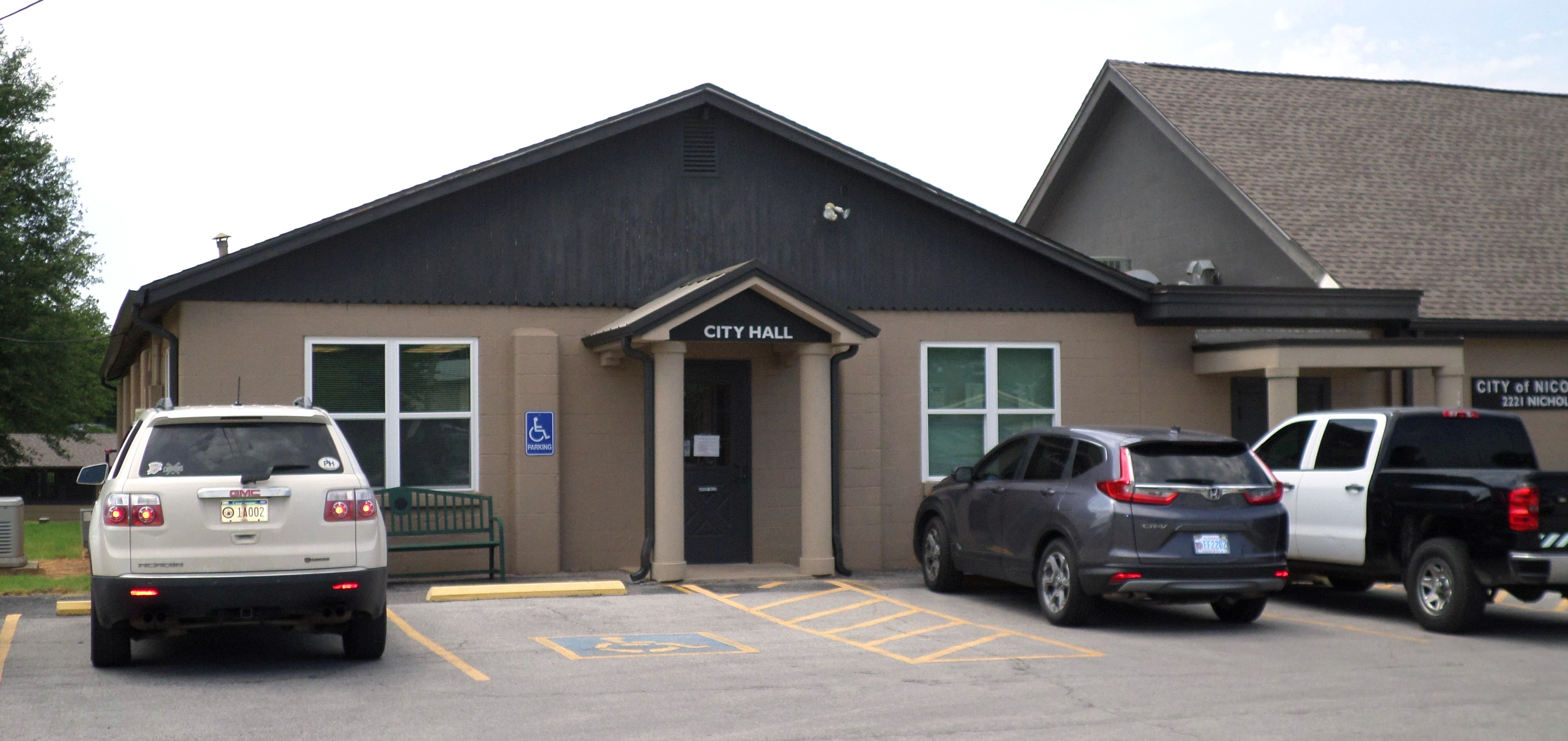
- Nicoma Park City Hall

- Location in Oklahoma County and the state of Oklahoma.
- Coordinates: 35°29′29″N 97°19′32″W
- Country: United States
- State: Oklahoma
- County: Oklahoma

Area
  - Total: 3.36 sq mi (8.70 km^{2})
  - Land: 3.36 sq mi (8.70 km^{2})
  - Water: 0 sq mi (0.00 km^{2})
- Elevation: 1,194 ft (364 m)

Population (2020)
  - Total: 2,313
  - Density: 688.3/sq mi (265.76/km^{2})
- Time zone: UTC-6 (Central (CST))
  - Summer (DST): UTC-5 (CDT)
- ZIP code: 73066
- Area code: 405
- FIPS code: 40-51850
- GNIS feature ID: 2411255
- Website: nicomapark.org

Nicoma Park is a city in Oklahoma County, Oklahoma, United States, and a part of the Oklahoma City metropolitan area. The name Nicoma is a portmanteau of the first three letters of Nichols, for G.A. Nichols, and the last three letters of Oklahoma. The population was 2,313 at the 2020 census, a 3.3% decrease from 2010.

== Geography ==
According to the United States Census Bureau, the city has a total area of 3.3 square miles (8.5 km^{2}), all land.

== Demographics ==
Historical population
Census	Pop.	Note	%±
1960	1,263		—
1970	2,560		102.7%
1980	2,588		1.1%
1990	2,353		−9.1%
2000	2,415		2.6%
2010	2,393		−0.9%
2020	2,313		−3.3%
U.S. Decennial Census

=== 2020 census ===
As of the 2020 census, Nicoma Park had a population of 2,313. The median age was 39.4 years. 24.2% of residents were under the age of 18 and 17.8% of residents were 65 years of age or older. For every 100 females there were 97.9 males, and for every 100 females age 18 and over there were 96.6 males age 18 and over.

85.3% of residents lived in urban areas, while 14.7% lived in rural areas.

There were 886 households in Nicoma Park, of which 32.7% had children under the age of 18 living in them. Of all households, 48.4% were married-couple households, 19.4% were households with a male householder and no spouse or partner present, and 23.7% were households with a female householder and no spouse or partner present. About 22.9% of all households were made up of individuals and 12.0% had someone living alone who was 65 years of age or older.

There were 1,024 housing units, of which 13.5% were vacant. Among occupied housing units, 78.2% were owner-occupied and 21.8% were renter-occupied. The homeowner vacancy rate was 1.4% and the rental vacancy rate was 17.1%.

Racial composition as of the 2020 census
Race	Percent
White	76.7%
Black or African American	2.5%
American Indian and Alaska Native	5.8%
Asian	0.3%
Native Hawaiian and Other Pacific Islander	0.2%
Some other race	1.5%
Two or more races	13.1%
Hispanic or Latino (of any race)	5.3%

=== 2000 census ===
As of the 2000 census of 2000, there were 2,415 people, 943 households, and 691 families residing in the city. The population density was 738.8 inhabitants per square mile (285.3/km^{2}). There were 1,089 housing units at an average density of 333.1 per square mile (128.6/km^{2}). The racial makeup of the city was 85.96% White, 3.40% African American, 4.43% Native American, 0.46% Asian, 0.87% from other races, and 4.89% from two or more races. Hispanic or Latino of any race were 3.56% of the population.

There were 941 households, out of which 30.2% had children under the age of 18 living with them, 57.3% were married couples living together, 11.6% had a female householder with no husband present, and 26.7% were non-families. 23.1% of all households were made up of individuals, and 9.8% had someone living alone who was 65 years of age or older. The average household size was 2.56 and the average family size was 3.02.

In the city, the population was spread out, with 25.5% under the age of 18, 7.4% from 18 to 24, 27.0% from 25 to 44, 23.5% from 45 to 64, and 16.6% who were 65 years of age or older. The median age was 38 years. For every 100 females, there were 100.9 males. For every 100 females age 18 and over, there were 95.0 males.

The median income for a household in the city was $36,190, and the median income for a family was $40,345. Males had a median income of $30,339 versus $20,417 for females. The per capita income for the city was $17,801. About 7.0% of families and 10.6% of the population were below the poverty line, including 14.3% of those under age 18 and 6.1% of those age 65 or over.

== City government ==
Nicoma Park has a Mayor-Council form of government. The mayor is elected like other city officials but fulfills both the role of overseeing the city council meetings and running the day-to-day affairs of the city's administration. The city council consists of six ward council members.

== Education ==
Most of Nicoma Park is in Choctaw/Nicoma Park Schools. A portion of Nicoma Park is in Oklahoma City Public Schools (OKCPS).

Schools in Nicoma Park, all in Choctaw/Nicoma Park Schools, include: Nicoma Park Elementary School, Nicoma Park Intermediate School, and Nicoma Park Middle School. The zoned high school of the Choctaw/Nicoma Park part is Choctaw High School.

Zoned schools of the OKCPS portion include Willow Brook Elementary School (PreKindergarten-Grade 1), Spencer Elementary School (grades 2-4), Rogers Intermediate School (grades 5-6), and Star Spencer Mid-High School.
