= Oklahoma City Public Schools =

Largest School District in Oklahoma City

Location
- 615 N. Classen, Oklahoma City, Oklahoma 73106 United States

District information
- Type: Public, Primary, Secondary, Co-Educational, Independent
- Grades: PK–12
- Established: 1889; 137 years ago
- Superintendent: Dr. Jamie C, Polk
- Schools: 60+
- Budget: $400 million

Students and staff
- Students: 33,000+ (2024-2025)
- Staff: 4,600

Other information
- Website: www.okcps.org

Oklahoma City Public Schools (OKCPS) is a school district headquartered in Oklahoma City, Oklahoma.

Its enrollment count is about 33,000 students. Students are educated throughout 31 elementary schools, 14 middle schools, 8 high schools, 4 alternative schools and 7 charter schools located within 135.5 square miles in the center of Oklahoma.

== History ==
Subscription schools were the first schools in Oklahoma Territory, but public schools began to emerge in the 1890s, shortly before 1907 statehood. By 1909, Oklahoma City had ten public school buildings. By 1930 the city had three high schools, six junior high schools, and 51 elementary schools with an enrollment of 38,593.

== Boundary ==
The district boundary, all in Oklahoma County, includes the majority of Oklahoma City, as well as Nichols Hills, Spencer, The Village, and Valley Brook, and portions of Choctaw, Del City, Midwest City, and Nicoma Park.

== Schools ==
=== High schools ===
- Opening Fall 2027: Belle Isle Enterprise High School
- Capitol Hill High School
- Classen School of Advanced Studies at Northeast
- Frederick A. Douglass High School
- Emerson North Alternative High School
- Emerson South Middle-High School
- U. S. Grant High School
- John Marshall High School
- Northwest Classen High School
- Southeast High School
- Star Spencer High School
- Putnam Heights Academy

=== Middle schools ===
- Jefferson Middle School
- John Marshall Enterprise Middle School
- Roosevelt Middle School
- Taft Middle School
- Belle Isle Enterprise Middle School
- Rogers Middle School, named for banker and school board member Melvin Parmer Rogers
- Emerson South Mid-high School
- FD Moon Middle School, named for Frederick Douglass Moon who was principal of Frederick A. Douglass High School in Oklahoma City
- Wheeler Middle School
- Capitol Hill Middle School
- Classen School of Advanced Studies Middle School
- Webster Middle School
- Southeast Middle School
- Mary Golda Ross Middle School

=== Elementary schools ===
- Adams Elementary School
- Adelaide Lee Elementary School - The district plans to open a replacement facility in 2026, which would cost $29,330,000.
- Arthur Elementary School
- Bodine Elementary School
- Britton Elementary School
- Buchanan Elementary School
- César Chávez Elementary School
- Cleveland Elementary School
- Coolidge Elementary School
- Esperanza Elementary School
- Eugene Field Elementary School
- Fillmore Elementary School
- Hawthorne Elementary School
- Hayes Elementary School
- Heronville Elementary School
- Hillcrest Elementary School
- Kaiser Elementary School
- Mark Twain Elementary School
- Martin Luther King Jr. Elementary School
- Monroe Elementary School
- Nichols Hills Elementary School
- Prairie Queen Elementary School
- Quail Creek Elementary School
- Ridgeview Elementary School
- Rockwood Elementary School
- Southern Hills Elementary School
- Spencer Elementary School
- Thelma Parks Elementary school
- Van Buren Elementary School
- Willow Brook Elementary School
- Wilson Elementary School

=== Early Childhood Education Centers ===
- Gatewood Early Learning Center

=== Pre-K ===
- Pre-K Center at Horace Mann
- Pre-K Center at Johnson

== Former schools ==
- Shidler Elementary School - The district intended to close that school in 2026 and move all students to Adelaide Lee Elementary School, which was to have a new building at that time. However in 2023 an issue with the building's structure caused the district to move many of the students to Adelaide Lee Elementary. In 2023 the district's board of education voted to immediately close the entire Shidler Elementary permanently and move all students to Adelaide Lee Elementary; the district decided that using only part of the Shidler Elementary facility would cause problems. That year the district was considering whether to repair the Shidler building and use it for another purpose.
- Central High School operated as a school from 1910 to 1981, and was converted to offices for Southwestern Bell in the mid-1980s. Since 2015, the building has housed the Oklahoma City University School of Law.
