= Harrah, Oklahoma =

- City
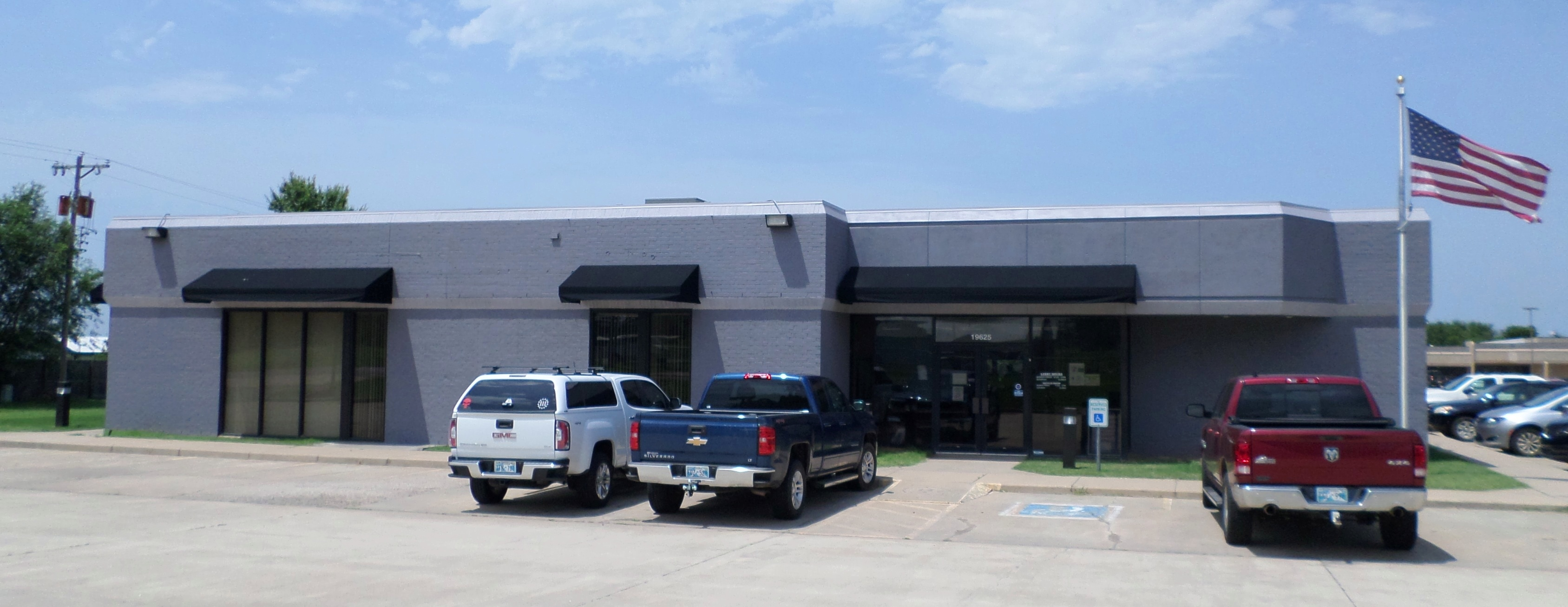
- Harrah City Hall

- Seal
- Motto: "Heart of the Heartland"
- Location in Oklahoma County and the state of Oklahoma.
- Coordinates: 35°28′43″N 97°11′14″W
- Country: United States
- State: Oklahoma
- County: Oklahoma

Area
  - Total: 12.42 sq mi (32.16 km^{2})
  - Land: 12.42 sq mi (32.16 km^{2})
  - Water: 0 sq mi (0.00 km^{2})
- Elevation: 1,139 ft (347 m)

Population (2020)
  - Total: 6,245
  - Density: 503/sq mi (194.2/km^{2})
- Time zone: UTC-6 (Central (CST))
  - Summer (DST): UTC-5 (CDT)
- ZIP code: 73045
- Area code: 405
- FIPS code: 40-32750
- GNIS feature ID: 2410705
- Website: cityofharrah.com

Harrah is a city in Oklahoma County, Oklahoma, United States, and a part of the Oklahoma City metropolitan area. Located 25 miles (40 km) east of downtown Oklahoma City, Harrah had a population of 6,245 people as of the 2020 Census, a 22.6% increase from 2010.

The first settler of the area, who was Potawatomi, arrived in the 1870s, but the town was not incorporated until 1908. The town was settled by Americans, Polish immigrants, and other groups and had a cotton ginning center. The city is overseen by a city council and mayor and includes a police department and fire station.

== Geography ==
Harrah is a small city in Oklahoma with a total land area of 11.9 square miles (31 km^{2}), all land. The city's elevation is 925 feet (282 m) above sea level. It lies partly in the Great Plains near the geographical center of the 48 contiguous states in the United States. It lies between the larger cities of Oklahoma City to the west and Shawnee, to the east, in Oklahoma County.

Harrah is located in the Crosstimbers ecoregion and the Frontier Country tourism region.

=== Climate ===
Oklahoma is located in a temperate region and experiences occasional extremes of temperature and precipitation typical of a continental climate. Harrah lies in an area known as Tornado Alley characterized by frequent interaction between cold and warm air masses producing severe weather. An average of 54 tornadoes strike the state per year.

The city frequently experiences temperatures above 100 °F (38 °C).

== History ==
The land that would become the town of Harrah had its first settler, Louis Navarre, in the 1870s. Navarre, was a member of the Potawatomi people who had signed an 1867 treaty to sell their Kansas lands in order to purchase lands in Native Territory with the proceeds. They also became citizens of the United States and thus became known as the Citizen Potawatomi.

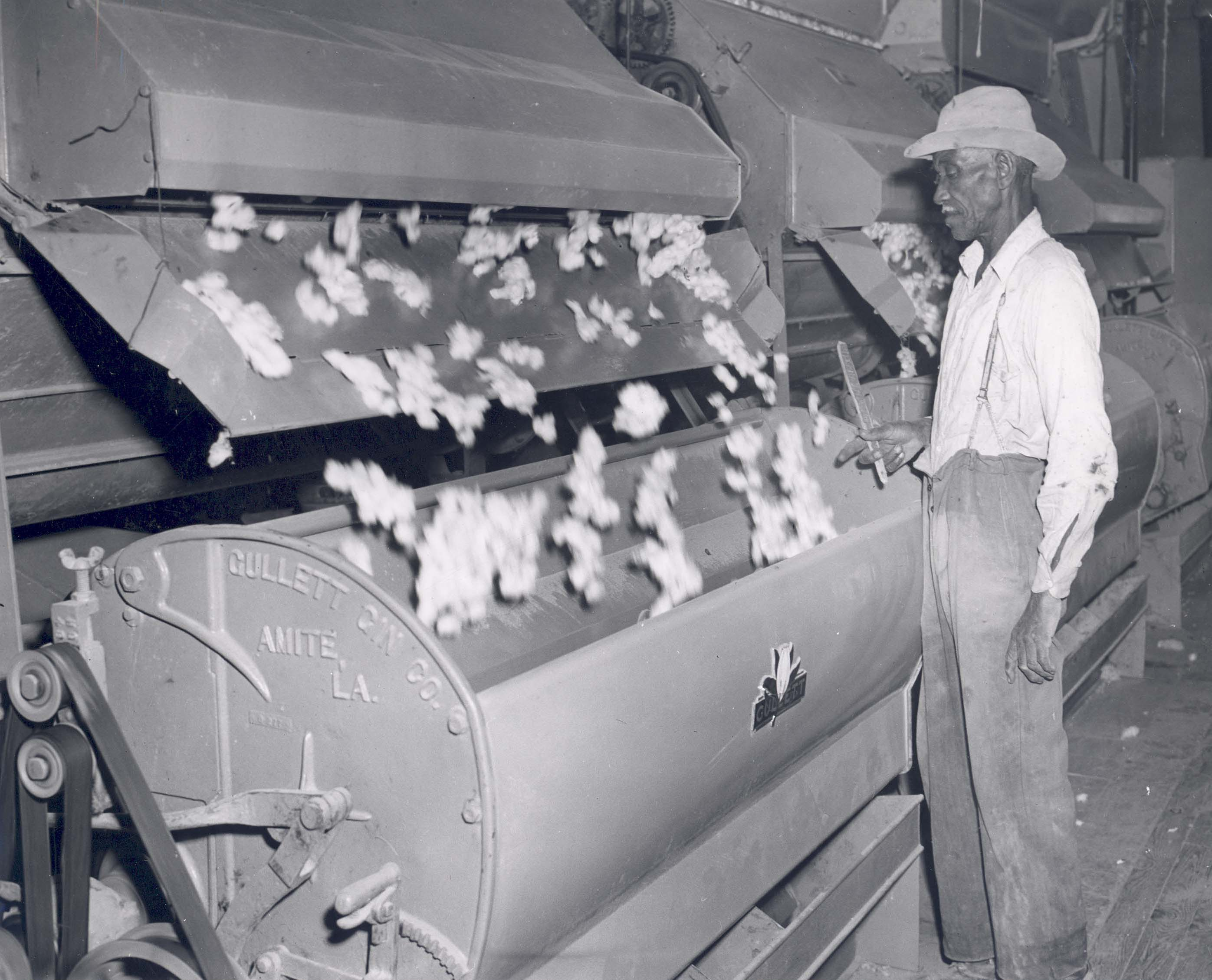
A cotton gin in the 1940s

In 1890, Navarre and the Citizen Potawatomi participated, unwillingly, in the allotment process implemented through the Dawes Act of 1887. With this Act, the Citizen Potawatomi people were forced to accept individual allotments. In the Land Run of 1891, the remainder of the Potawatomi reservation in Oklahoma was opened up to non-Indian settlement, with about 450 square miles (1,200 km^{2}) of the reservation given away by the government to settlers.

Frank Harrah, for whom the town is named, purchased 40 acres (160,000 m^{2}) from Louis Navarre's allotment in April 1898 and early settlers included a large number of Polish immigrants. More than two million Poles entered American ports between 1897 and 1913, and the immigrants formed small communities around Choctaw Nation coal mines.

Originally named Sweeney, after E.W. Sweeney, who operated a ferry beginning in 1891, the town was renamed Harrah on December 22, 1898, and was incorporated in 1908. The town was almost renamed Clubb.

In the 1940s Harrah was a center of cotton ginning. Its population was 741 in 1950. By 1990 4,206 people lived in Harrah.

== Demographics ==
Historical population
Census	Pop.	Note	%±
1910	356		—
1920	365		2.5%
1930	693		89.9%
1940	620		−10.5%
1950	741		19.5%
1960	934		26.0%
1970	1,931		106.7%
1980	2,897		50.0%
1990	4,206		45.2%
2000	4,719		12.2%
2010	5,095		8.0%
2020	6,245		22.6%
U.S. Decennial Census

=== 2020 census ===
As of the 2020 census, Harrah had a population of 6,245. The median age was 37.3 years, 25.6% of residents were under the age of 18, and 16.4% of residents were 65 years of age or older. For every 100 females there were 95.1 males, and for every 100 females age 18 and over there were 90.1 males age 18 and over.

There were 2,413 households in Harrah, of which 36.7% had children under the age of 18 living in them. Of all households, 52.8% were married-couple households, 15.3% were households with a male householder and no spouse or partner present, and 25.8% were households with a female householder and no spouse or partner present. About 23.3% of all households were made up of individuals, and 11.4% had someone living alone who was 65 years of age or older.

There were 2,574 housing units, of which 6.3% were vacant. Among occupied housing units, 70.7% were owner-occupied and 29.3% were renter-occupied. The homeowner vacancy rate was 1.7% and the rental vacancy rate was 7.4%.

13.6% of residents lived in urban areas, while 86.4% lived in rural areas.

Racial composition as of the 2020 census
Race	Percent
White	77.6%
Black or African American	1.6%
American Indian and Alaska Native	6.2%
Asian	0.8%
Native Hawaiian and Other Pacific Islander	<0.1%
Some other race	1.1%
Two or more races	12.6%
Hispanic or Latino (of any race)	5.0%

=== 2010 census ===
As of the 2010 census, the population density was 503 people per square mile. The racial makeup of the city was 84% white, 1% African American, 7.3% Native American, 0.7% Asian, 0.7% from other races, and 6.3% from two or more races. Hispanic or Latino of any race made up 4% of the population.

Of the 1,960 households, 33% had children under the age of 18 living with them, 57.6% consisted of married couples living together, 10.8% had a female householder with no husband present, and 26.3% were non-families. 22.7% of the households were occupied by a single individual, and 26.1% had someone living alone who was 65 years of age or older. The average household size was 2.57 and the average family size was 3.02.

In the city, the population was spread out, with 25.8% under the age of 18, 30.3% from 18 to 64, and 14.5% who were 65 years of age or older. The median age was 38.5 years. The population was 52.1% female and 47.9% male.

=== 2022 American Community Survey ===
According to the 2022 American Community Survey 5-Year Estimates, the median income for a household in the city was $68,661, and the median income for a family was $76,725. The per capita income for the city was $32,778. About 6.1% of families and 8.4% of the population were below the poverty line, including 17.1% of those under age 18 and 4.7% of those age 65 or over.

== City government ==
The City of Harrah has a city council made up of elected officials and led by a mayor. A council-appointed city manager runs the day-to-day administration of the city and oversees city staff. The city also holds a municipal court twice a month.

As of April 2024, the city council consists of Mayor Danny Trent and council members Bernadette Klimkowski, Tim Rudek, Jeff Brzozowski, and Steve Scalzo.

The City of Harrah includes several departments, including a small fire department consisting of several paid firefighters and many volunteer firefighters. The police department includes full-time detectives, patrol officers, part-time officers, and voluntary reserve officers. The city also offers a comprehensive set of public utilities managed by the utility department and a public works department.

== Education ==
Most of the city lies in the Harrah school district, with some western parts of the city in the Choctaw-Nicoma Park school district. Both districts offer primary and secondary school education. Harrah schools spend approximately $3,204 per student and have 24 students per teacher.

No higher education institutions exist in Harrah. Oklahoma Baptist University is located approximately 30 miles to the southeast in Shawnee, Oklahoma, and other options lie 30–45 minutes to the west in Oklahoma City and to the southwest in Norman.

== Notable people ==
- Jason Boland, Red Dirt singer and guitar player for Jason Boland and The Stragglers.
- Lance Cargill, political consultant, former Speaker of the Oklahoma House of Representatives.
- Matt Grice, UFC fighter
- Tim Holt, Western genre actor, buried here in 1973
- Dale Robertson, western actor was born in Harrah in 1923
- Lloyd Waner, Hall of Fame Baseball player with the Pittsburgh Pirates
- Paul Waner, Hall of Fame Baseball player with the Pittsburgh Pirates
