= Midwest City, Oklahoma =

- City
- Flag Logo
- Motto: Where the Spirit Flies High
- Location in Oklahoma County and the state of Oklahoma.

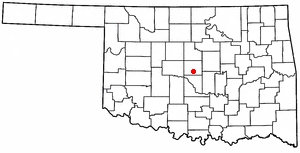
- Coordinates: 35°27′53″N 97°23′53″W
- Country: United States
- State: Oklahoma
- County: Oklahoma
- Incorporated: March 11, 1943

Government
  - Type: Council – Manager
  - Mayor: Rick Rice
  - City manager: Tim Lyon

Area
  - Total: 24.41 sq mi (63.23 km^{2})
  - Land: 24.40 sq mi (63.19 km^{2})
  - Water: 0.015 sq mi (0.04 km^{2})
- Elevation: 1,221 ft (372 m)

Population (2020)
  - Total: 58,409
  - Density: 2,394.0/sq mi (924.33/km^{2})
- Time zone: UTC−6 (Central (CST))
  - Summer (DST): UTC−5 (CDT)
- ZIP codes: 73110, 73130, 73140
- Area code: 405
- FIPS code: 40-48350
- GNIS feature ID: 2411102
- Website: midwestcityok.org

Midwest City is a city in Oklahoma County, Oklahoma, United States, and a part of the Oklahoma City metropolitan area. As of the 2020 census, the population was 58,409, making it the eighth largest city in the state.

The city was developed in response to talk of an air field being located nearby and named for the Tinker Air Force Base's original designation as the Midwest Air Depot. The city suffered damage during two tornadoes, the first in May 1999 and the second on May 8, 2003.

== History ==
W.P. "Bill" Atkinson bought land in the area that would become Midwest City after hearing speculation that an air field was going to be built nearby. The city, which was incorporated on March 11, 1943, was named for the air field's original designation as the Midwest Air Depot. When Major General Clarence L. Tinker of Pawhuska, Oklahoma became the first American general killed in World War II (June 7, 1942) near Wake Island, the airfield was renamed in his honor.

Seward Mott, the director of the Federal Housing Administration's Land Planning Division, helped design the city, gaining national print and broadcast attention, and it became a model for postwar community development. The city incorporated the Mishak community of Czech and German immigrants that had formed in what now is the southeast part of the city.

In 1947, returning veteran Nicholas Harroz opened Nick's Brett Drive Grocery, which later became Crest Discount Foods, which is now one of the largest discount chains in the Oklahoma City metro area. Soon after its opening, Midwest City citizens opted for a charter-council-city manager form of government to better manage their rapid growth.

Midwest City's regional hospital was dedicated October 6, 1962, built with the use of bond money. Voters also approved the creation of a junior college district in 1968. Oscar Rose Junior College opened its doors to students in 1970 and is now known as Rose State College. The Heritage Park Mall opened in 1978 on North Air Depot and was a prime shopping area in the city for several decades. The first Sam's Club was opened in Midwest City on April 7, 1983.

In the early 1970s, the Glenwood Addition subdivision, just north of the TAFB runway, was purchased from individual owners with funds raised in a county-wide bond election after plane crashes in the area killed several civilians and military crewmen. 835 homes were moved and an elementary school was closed down. The former subdivision is fenced off and used as storage and training exercises for TAFB personnel.

Portions of Midwest City particularly northwest of Tinker Air Force Base sustained extreme damage from a violent tornado that swept through the southern and eastern areas of the Oklahoma City Metro on May 3, 1999. While it produced F5 damage in South Oklahoma City, damage in Midwest City was rated high-end F4 (although F5 was considered), with numerous destroyed homes and three fatalities. Another F4 tornado struck the southeastern end of Tinker AFB and Midwest City four years later on May 8, 2003.

City officials worked to revitalize S.E. 29th Street in the early 21st century, leading to the development of a new Town Center Plaza shopping area that faces Interstate 40 and Tinker Air Force Base. The Town Center Plaza development replaced an aging, largely deserted Atkinson Plaza shopping center. In 2003, the Reed Center, a 60,000-square-foot (5,600 m^{2}) convention center, was built. Meanwhile, the Heritage Park Mall has slowly dwindled, becoming an issue of contention in the 2010 mayoral race.

== Geography ==
According to the United States Census Bureau, the city has a total area of 24.6 square miles (64 km^{2}), all land. The city's elevation is 1,157 feet above sea level.

The city is located in Oklahoma County and the area is known for low hills and two species of blackjack oak and post oak. Midwest City also falls into an ecological region known as the Cross Timbers, and the Frontier Country tourism region

=== Climate ===
Midwest City has a humid subtropical climate (Köppen climate classification Cfa).

Climate data for Midwest City, Oklahoma
Month	Jan	Feb	Mar	Apr	May	Jun	Jul	Aug	Sep	Oct	Nov	Dec	Year
Mean daily maximum °F (°C)	47 (8)	53 (12)	63 (17)	71 (22)	79 (26)	87 (31)	93 (34)	92 (33)	84 (29)	73 (23)	60 (16)	50 (10)	71 (22)
Mean daily minimum °F (°C)	26 (−3)	27 (−3)	39 (4)	48 (9)	58 (14)	66 (19)	71 (22)	70 (21)	62 (17)	51 (11)	38 (3)	29 (−2)	49 (9)
Average precipitation inches (mm)	1.28 (33)	1.56 (40)	2.90 (74)	3.00 (76)	5.44 (138)	4.63 (118)	2.94 (75)	2.48 (63)	3.98 (101)	3.64 (92)	2.11 (54)	1.89 (48)	35.85 (911)
Source: NOAA (extremes 1890–present)

== Demographics ==
Historical population
Census	Pop.	Note	%±
1950	10,166		—
1960	36,058		254.7%
1970	48,114		33.4%
1980	49,559		3.0%
1990	52,267		5.5%
2000	54,088		3.5%
2010	54,371		0.5%
2020	58,409		7.4%

=== 2020 census ===
As of the 2020 census, Midwest City had a population of 58,409. The median age was 36.3 years; 24.1% of residents were under the age of 18 and 16.1% of residents were 65 years of age or older. For every 100 females there were 89.5 males, and for every 100 females age 18 and over there were 85.7 males age 18 and over.

99.6% of residents lived in urban areas, while 0.4% lived in rural areas.

There were 24,274 households in Midwest City, of which 30.6% had children under the age of 18 living in them. Of all households, 36.5% were married-couple households, 20.9% were households with a male householder and no spouse or partner present, and 35.1% were households with a female householder and no spouse or partner present. About 32.7% of all households were made up of individuals and 12.5% had someone living alone who was 65 years of age or older.

There were 26,522 housing units, of which 8.5% were vacant. Among occupied housing units, 54.4% were owner-occupied and 45.6% were renter-occupied. The homeowner vacancy rate was 1.4% and the rental vacancy rate was 10.2%.

Racial composition as of the 2020 census
Race	Percent
White	55.3%
Black or African American	22.8%
American Indian and Alaska Native	4.0%
Asian	1.7%
Native Hawaiian and Other Pacific Islander	0.2%
Some other race	2.6%
Two or more races	13.4%
Hispanic or Latino (of any race)	8.4%

=== 2010 census ===
The census of 2010 recorded 54,371 people, 22,726 households, and 14,293 families residing in the city. The population density was 2,210.2 inhabitants per square mile (853.4/km^{2}). There were 25,535 housing units at an average density of 1,038.0 per square mile (400.8/km^{2}).

There were 22,726 households, out of which 31.8% had children under the age of 18 living with them, 46.2% were married couples living together, 16.5% had a female householder with no husband present, and 33.4% were non-families. 28.6% of all households were made up of individuals, and 9.5% had someone living alone who was 65 years of age or older. The average household size was 2.42 and the average family size was 2.97.

The racial makeup of the city was 64.6% White, 21.9% African American, 3.7% Native American, 1.7% Asian, 0.1% Pacific Islander, 1.5% from other races, and 6.5% from two or more races. Hispanic or Latino of any race were 5.6% of the population.

In the city, the age distribution of the population shows 25.2% under the age of 18, 9.9% from 18 to 24, 26.3% from 25 to 44, 25.3% from 45 to 64, and 13.3% who were 65 years of age or older. The median age was 35.2 years. For every 100 females, there were 91.4 males. For every 100 females age 18 and over, there were 90.1 males.

The median income for a household in the city was $44,578, and the median income for a family was $54,348. Males had a median income of $40,275 versus $32,098 for females. The per capita income for the city was $23,264. About 12.4% of families and 16.0% of the population were below the poverty line, including 24.6% of those under age 18 and 9.1% of those age 65 or over.

== Economy ==
Midwest City's economic base is heavily dependent upon Federal tax dollars via Tinker Air Force Base, the largest single-site employer in Oklahoma. Other large employers include the Midwest Regional Medical Center and aerospace industry businesses affiliated with the base. The General Motors Oklahoma City Assembly plant was another major employer from its opening in 1979 until its closure in February 2006. GM closed the plant as part of a cost-savings measure. The property was later acquired by Oklahoma County and leased to Tinker Air Force Base for $1/year. Tinker renamed the facility the Tinker Aerospace Complex.

During World War II, the Midwest City Douglas Aircraft Company Plant constructed more than half of the 10,000 C-47 Skytrain U.S. Army cargo planes. The plant cost $24 million and rolled out its first C-47s in March 1943. Some 38,000 Oklahomans labored at the plant, the majority of them women. The plant closed on August 17, 1945, and was redesignated Building 3001 and transferred to the Oklahoma City Air Technical Service Command on November 1, 1945 and is now the Oklahoma City Air Logistics Center.

== Arts and culture ==
Midwest City is home to a four-star 18-hole municipal golf course, a 9-hole municipal golf course, a swimming pool, splash park, and several urban parks. The nearby base hosts an annual Star-Spangled Salute each summer. The Juneteenth Midwest City Family Festival began in 2023 commemorating the national Juneteenth holiday. Rose State College hosts Global Oklahoma each year on the first Saturday in October.

When Midwest City's founder and developer, W. P. "Bill" Atkinson, died in 1999, he left his 1955 mansion in trust for the community's enjoyment and historical appreciation. Today, the Atkinson Heritage Center at N.E. 10th and Midwest Blvd. is owned by the Rose State College Foundation and maintained by the college. The 8,000 sq. ft. historic home, preserved in its original design when Atkinson was anticipating a run for governor, is available for free tours by appointment. To serve the community and help financially support the historic property, the house conference room and the 1951 pony barn are available for event rentals.

== Education ==
Midwest City is within the boundaries of multiple school districts. The largest portion is within Mid-Del School District, and includes Midwest City High School, Carl Albert High School, Midwest City Middle School, Carl Albert Middle School and numerous elementary schools. The district also includes a post-secondary school, the Mid-Del Technology Center. Rose State College, a two-year community college, is also located in the city.

The school district was initially housed in prefabricated hutments and began with a high school and two grade schools that were precursors to the Sooner and Soldier Creek elementary schools.

Other parts of Midwest City are in Choctaw/Nicoma Park Schools, Oklahoma City Public Schools (OKCPS), and Crutcho Public School. Zoned schools of the OKCPS part include Willow Brook Elementary School (pre-kindergarten-grade 1), Spencer Elementary School (grades 2-4), Rogers Intermediate School (grades 5-6), and Star Spencer Mid-High School.

== Points of interest ==
- Tinker Air Force Base
- Outdoor air museum, on both sides of the I-40 freeway

== Notable people ==
- Nina Akamu, artist
- Royce D. Applegate, actor on such TV programs as seaQuest DSV
- Ryan Budde, MLB catcher
- Mike Gundy, former head coach for Oklahoma State Cowboys football team
- Cale Gundy, assistant coach for the University of Oklahoma Sooners .
- A. J. Hinch, manager of the Detroit Tigers
- Matt Kemp, left fielder for the Los Angeles Dodgers
- Angela Lindvall, supermodel
- J. T. Realmuto (born 1991), a Major League Baseball player; catcher for the Philadelphia Phillies
- Brian Tallet, pitcher for the St. Louis Cardinals
- 2Slimey, rapper
