= Choctaw, Oklahoma =

City in Oklahoma, United States

- City
- City of Choctaw
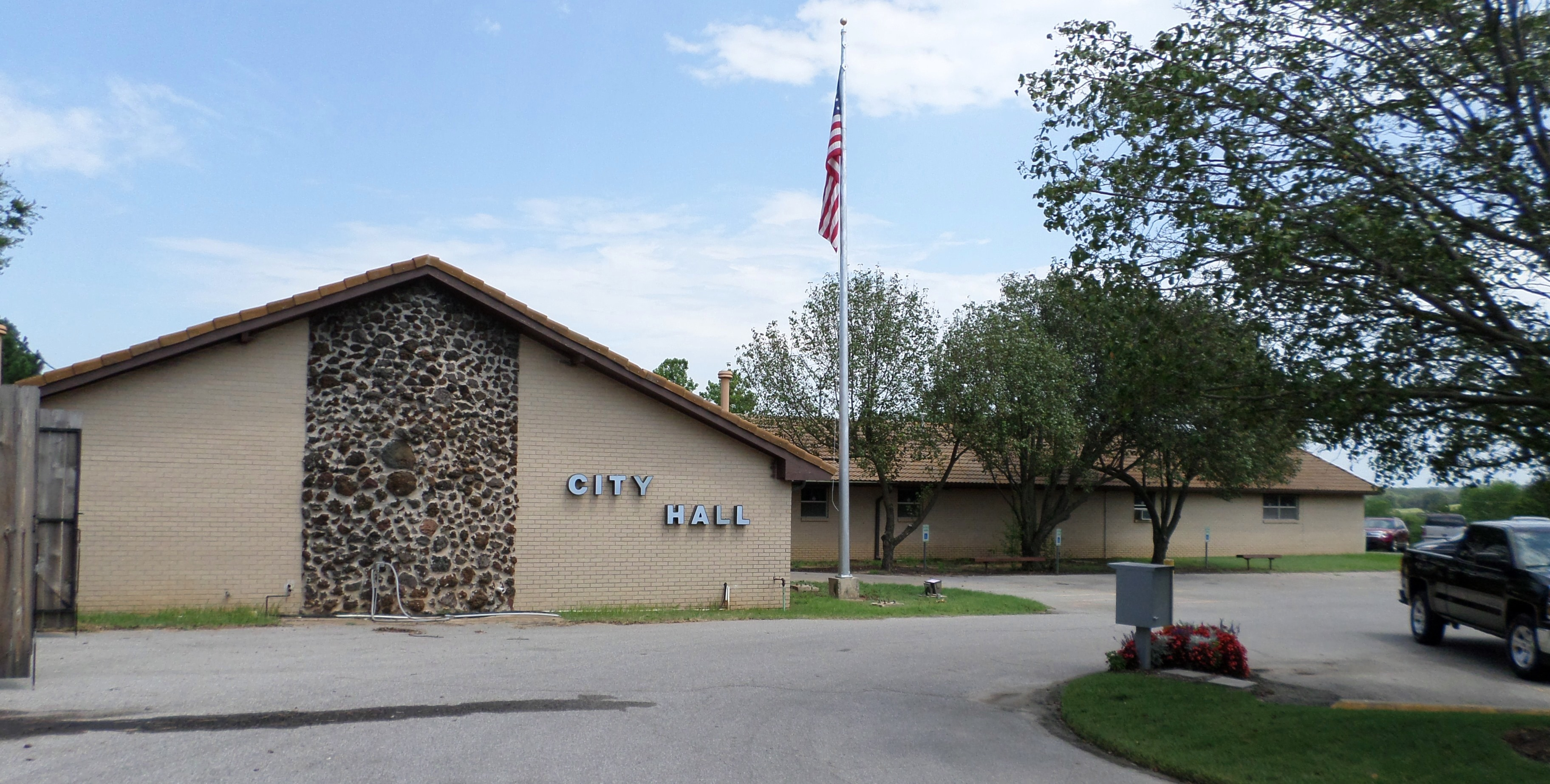
- Choctaw City Hall

- Flag Seal
- Motto: "Celebrating the Past, Enjoying the Present, & Preparing for the Future."
- Location in Oklahoma County and the state of Oklahoma

- Location in the United States
- Coordinates: 35°28′49″N 97°16′00″W
- Country: United States
- State: Oklahoma
- County: Oklahoma

Area
  - Total: 27.16 sq mi (70.34 km^{2})
  - Land: 27.12 sq mi (70.25 km^{2})
  - Water: 0.035 sq mi (0.09 km^{2})
- Elevation: 1,155 ft (352 m)

Population (2020)
  - Total: 12,182
  - Density: 449.2/sq mi (173.42/km^{2})
- Time zone: UTC-6 (Central (CST))
  - Summer (DST): UTC-5 (CDT)
- ZIP code: 73020
- Area code: 405
- FIPS code: 40-14200
- GNIS feature ID: 2409457
- Website: www.choctawcity.org

Choctaw is a city in Oklahoma County, Oklahoma, United States, with a population of 12,182 at the 2020 census, a 9.3% increase from 2010. It is the oldest chartered town in Oklahoma Territory. The city is located approximately 10 miles (16.1 km) east of Oklahoma City and is part of the Oklahoma City metropolitan area.

Choctaw became a community in 1890, but was not given actual status as a town until 1893 when a territorial governor was appointed for Oklahoma. It officially celebrated its 100th anniversary in 1993. In 1950, Choctaw was in an agricultural area. It had a population of 355 in that year. Despite its name, the town has no cultural, historical or governmental ties to the Choctaw Nation of Oklahoma. The tribal headquarters and casino are located in the southeastern part of the state in Durant, Oklahoma, and the Choctaw Capitol Building and annual Labor Day Festival are in Tuskahoma, Oklahoma.

Before Choctaw was chartered, the area included a part of William McClure's 7C Ranch and was known for a trading post and a camping spot near a spring.

A community emerged on the east 80 acres (32 ha) of land John S. Muzzy claimed in the 1889 land run and received a postal designation in early 1890.

The town incorporated in April 1904. When Oklahoma became a state in 1907, the town had 230 residents, four churches, a school, a bank, a newspaper and telephone service. By 1909, the town had three gins. The population grew very little during the Great Depression.

== Geography ==
Choctaw is a city just east of Oklahoma City and has a total area of 27.1 square miles (70 km^{2}), of which 27.1 square miles is land and 0.04 square miles (0.10 km^{2}) is water.

=== Ecoregion and tourism region ===
Choctaw is located in the Cross Timbers ecoregion and the Frontier Country tourism region.

=== Climate ===
Choctaw has a humid subtropical climate (Köppen climate classification: Cfa) and lies in an area known as Tornado Alley, characterized by frequent interaction between cold and warm air masses producing severe weather. An average of 54 tornadoes strike the state per year.

Climate data for Choctaw, Oklahoma
Month	Jan	Feb	Mar	Apr	May	Jun	Jul	Aug	Sep	Oct	Nov	Dec	Year
Mean daily maximum °F (°C)	50 (10)	54 (12)	63 (17)	72 (22)	79 (26)	87 (31)	93 (34)	93 (34)	84 (29)	74 (23)	62 (17)	51 (11)	72 (22)
Mean daily minimum °F (°C)	25 (−4)	29 (−2)	37 (3)	46 (8)	57 (14)	65 (18)	70 (21)	69 (21)	60 (16)	48 (9)	37 (3)	28 (−2)	48 (9)
Average precipitation inches (mm)	1.55 (39)	2.26 (57)	3.11 (79)	3.38 (86)	5.44 (138)	5.73 (146)	2.58 (66)	2.81 (71)	4.56 (116)	4.54 (115)	2.69 (68)	2.11 (54)	40.76 (1,035)

== Demographics ==
Historical population
Census	Pop.	Note	%±
1900	230		—
1910	242		5.2%
1920	199		−17.8%
1930	242		21.6%
1940	289		19.4%
1950	355		22.8%
1960	623		75.5%
1970	4,750		662.4%
1980	7,520		58.3%
1990	8,545		13.6%
2000	9,377		9.7%
2010	11,146		18.9%
2020	12,182		9.3%

=== 2020 census ===
As of the 2020 census, Choctaw had a population of 12,182. The median age was 41.7 years. 24.4% of residents were under the age of 18 and 18.5% of residents were 65 years of age or older. For every 100 females there were 97.0 males, and for every 100 females age 18 and over there were 94.0 males age 18 and over.

69.4% of residents lived in urban areas, while 30.6% lived in rural areas.

There were 4,585 households in Choctaw, of which 34.4% had children under the age of 18 living in them. Of all households, 61.3% were married-couple households, 13.7% were households with a male householder and no spouse or partner present, and 21.0% were households with a female householder and no spouse or partner present. About 20.3% of all households were made up of individuals and 9.7% had someone living alone who was 65 years of age or older.

There were 4,802 housing units, of which 4.5% were vacant. Among occupied housing units, 83.8% were owner-occupied and 16.2% were renter-occupied. The homeowner vacancy rate was 1.2% and the rental vacancy rate was 5.3%.

Racial composition as of the 2020 census
Race	Percent
White	78.0%
Black or African American	2.8%
American Indian and Alaska Native	5.1%
Asian	0.9%
Native Hawaiian and Other Pacific Islander	0.1%
Some other race	1.4%
Two or more races	11.7%
Hispanic or Latino (of any race)	5.2%

=== 2000 census ===
At the 2000 census, there were 9,377 people, 3 households and 2,808 families residing in the city. The population density was 346.4 inhabitants per square mile (133.7/km^{2}). There were 3,617 housing units at an average density of 133.6 per square mile (51.6/km^{2}). The racial makeup of the city was 88.80% White, 1.64% African American, 3.70% Native American, 0.62% Asian, 0.06% Pacific Islander, 0.85% from other races, and 4.32% from two or more races. Hispanic or Latino of any race were 2.79% of the population.

There were 3,450 households, of which 35.9% had children under the age of 18 living with them, 68.0% were married couples living together, 9.5% had a female householder with no husband present, and 18.6% were non-families. 16.2% of all households were made up of individuals, and 6.0% had someone living alone who was 65 years of age or older. The average household size was 2.69 and the average family size was 2.99.

25.9% of the population were under the age of 18, 7.6% from 18 to 24, 28.7% from 25 to 44, 27.3% from 45 to 64, and 10.6% who were 65 years of age or older. The median age was 38 years. For every 100 females, there were 96.7 males. For every 100 females age 18 and over, there were 94.1 males.

The median household income was $49,291 and the median family income was $55,437. Males had a median income of $36,540 versus $27,914 for females. The per capita income for the city was $21,041. About 3.7% of families and 5.9% of the population were below the poverty line, including 9.0% of those under age 18 and 6.1% of those age 65 or over.

== City government ==
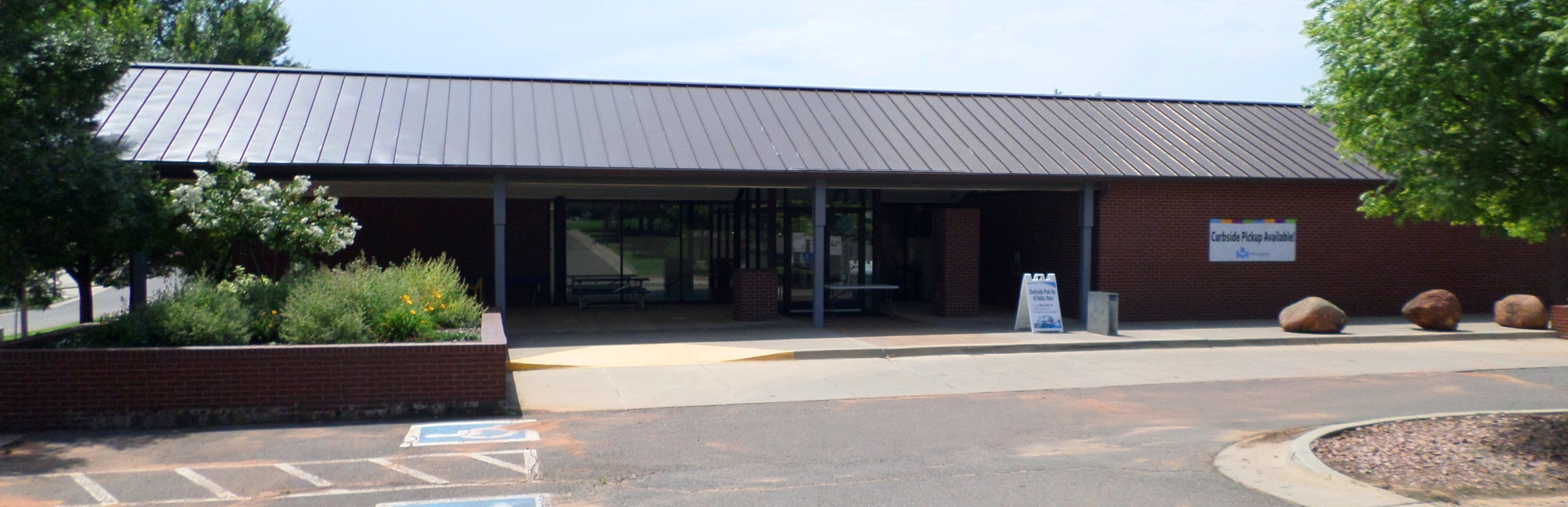
Choctaw Library, part of the Metropolitan Library System

The City of Choctaw has a city council made up of elected officials and led by a mayor. A council-appointed city manager administers the day-to-day affairs of the city and oversees city staff. Individual departments such as the police department and fire department are overseen by a police chief and fire chief, respectively.

== Arts and culture ==
The town has a small museum dedicated to beer steins, the Stramski Collection.

== Education ==
The majority of Choctaw is in the Choctaw-Nicoma Park School District. Choctaw High School is the zoned high school of the district.

Choctaw High School's Varsity Academic Team, coached by Paula Sendall, is ranked 1st in Oklahoma as of 2017 and has been invited to multiple national-level competitions after winning the 6A State Championship in February 2017. Choctaw public schools spend $4,133 per student. The average school expenditure in the U.S. is $6,058. There are about 15 students per teacher in Choctaw. Students graduating from Choctaw High School also have the opportunity to take advantage of the "Ticket to Rose" program at Rose State College. Ticket to Rose provides a scholarship for tuition and mandatory fees for all graduates of Choctaw High School.

Other parts of Choctaw are in Jones Public Schools and Oklahoma City Public Schools (OKCPS). Zoned schools of the OKCPS part include Willow Brook Elementary School (PreKindergarten-Grade 1), Spencer Elementary School (grades 2-4), Rogers Intermediate School (grades 5-6), and Star Spencer Mid-High School.

Choctaw contains a career technology school, the Eastern Oklahoma County Technology Center.

== Notable people ==
- Lyle Boren, father of David L. Boren and former U.S. Congressman
- Gary Haught, former MLB pitcher
- Louis L'Amour, author
- Becka Leathers, wrestler
- Michael Maples, race driver
- Ryan Merriman, actor
- Ashylynn Brooke, adult film actress
- Greg Jennings, musician
- Dusty Pack, actor
