= 2018 Oklahoma City mayoral election =

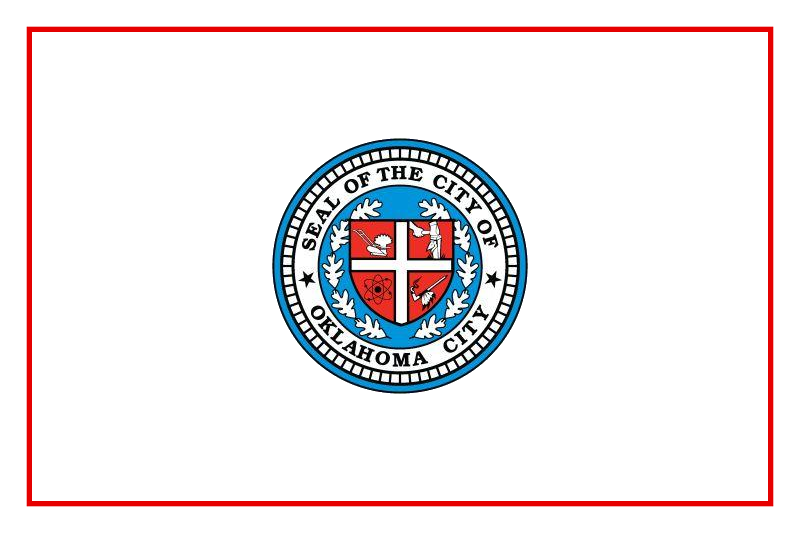
- February 13, 2018
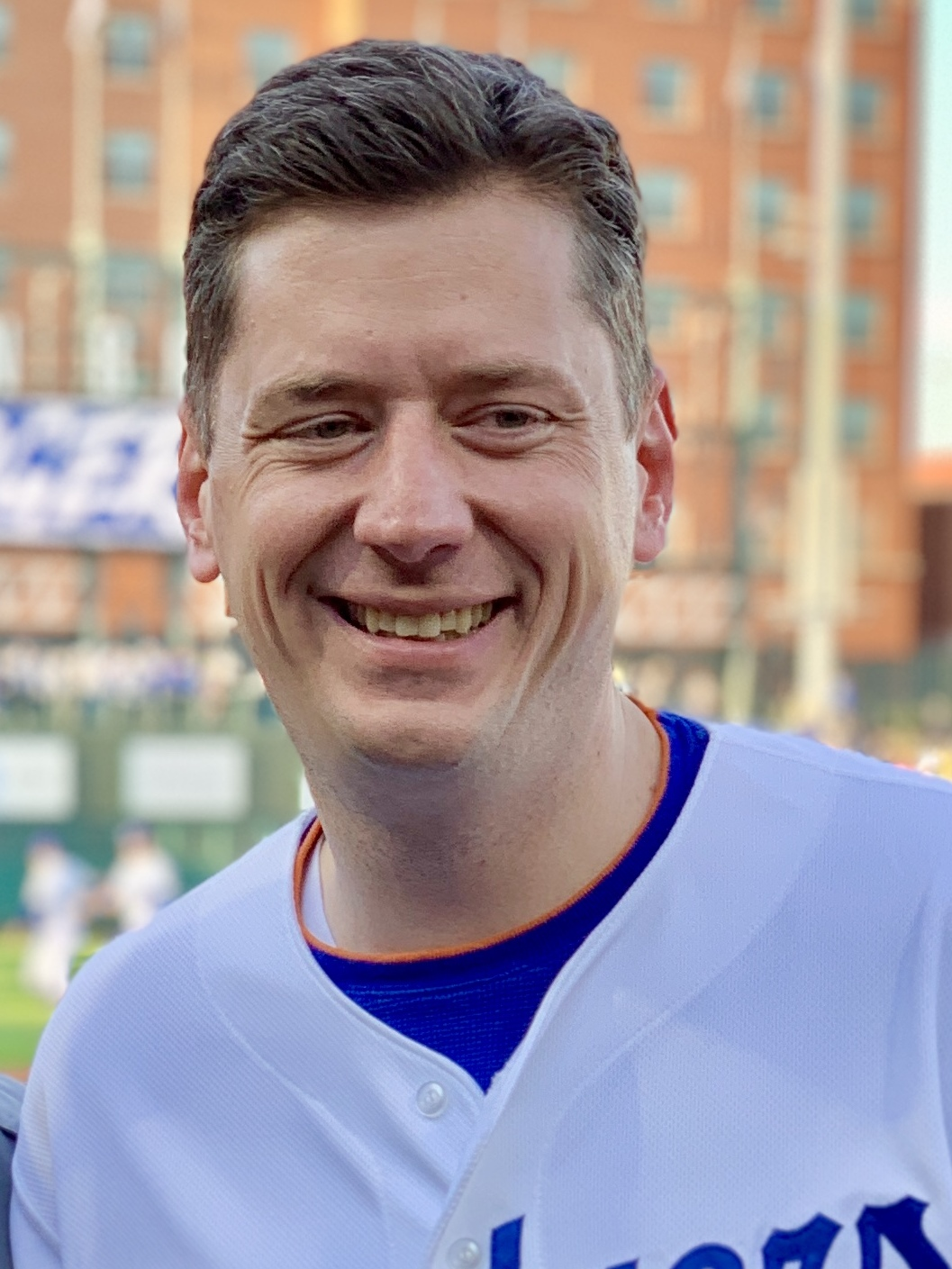

Nominee	David Holt	Taylor Neighbors	Randall Smith
Party	Nonpartisan	Nonpartisan	Nonpartisan
Popular vote	31,514	3,443	2,138
Percentage	65.70%	13.24%	8.22%
Mayor before election
Mick Cornett
Nonpartisan
Elected Mayor
David Holt
Nonpartisan

The 2018 Oklahoma City mayoral election took place on February 13, 2018. Incumbent Mayor Mick Cornett did not seek re-election to a fifth term, instead opting to unsuccessfully run for Governor in the Republican primary.

Republican State Senator David Holt ran to succeed Cornett and faced two little-known opponents, University of Oklahoma student Taylor Neighbors and accountant Randall Smith. Holt won the election in a landslide, receiving 79 percent of the vote to Neighbors's 13 percent and Smith's 8 percent.

== General election ==
=== Candidates ===
- David Holt, State Senator
- Taylor Neighbors, University of Oklahoma student
- Randall Smith, accountant

=== Results ===
2018 Oklahoma City mayoral election results
Party	Candidate	Votes	%
Nonpartisan	David Holt	20,416	78.53%
Nonpartisan	Taylor Neighbors	3,443	13.24%
Nonpartisan	Randall Smith	2,138	8.22%
Total votes		25,997	100.00%
