= 2026 Oklahoma City mayoral election =

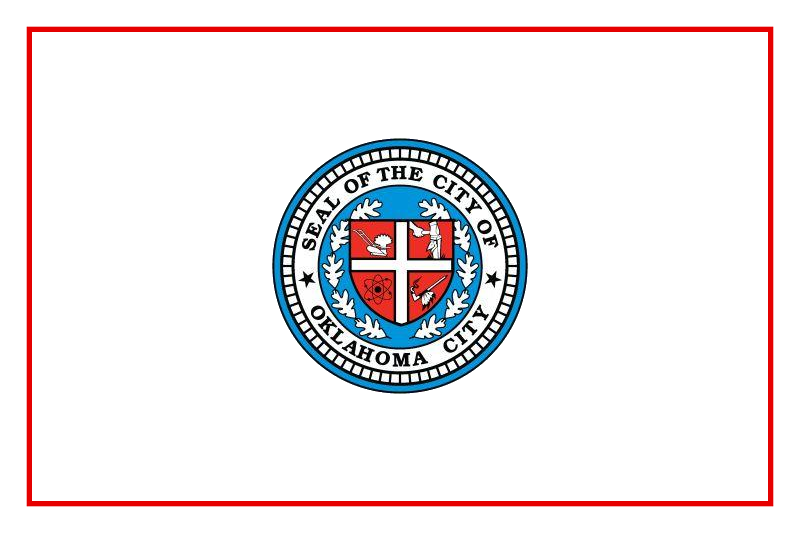
- February 10, 2026
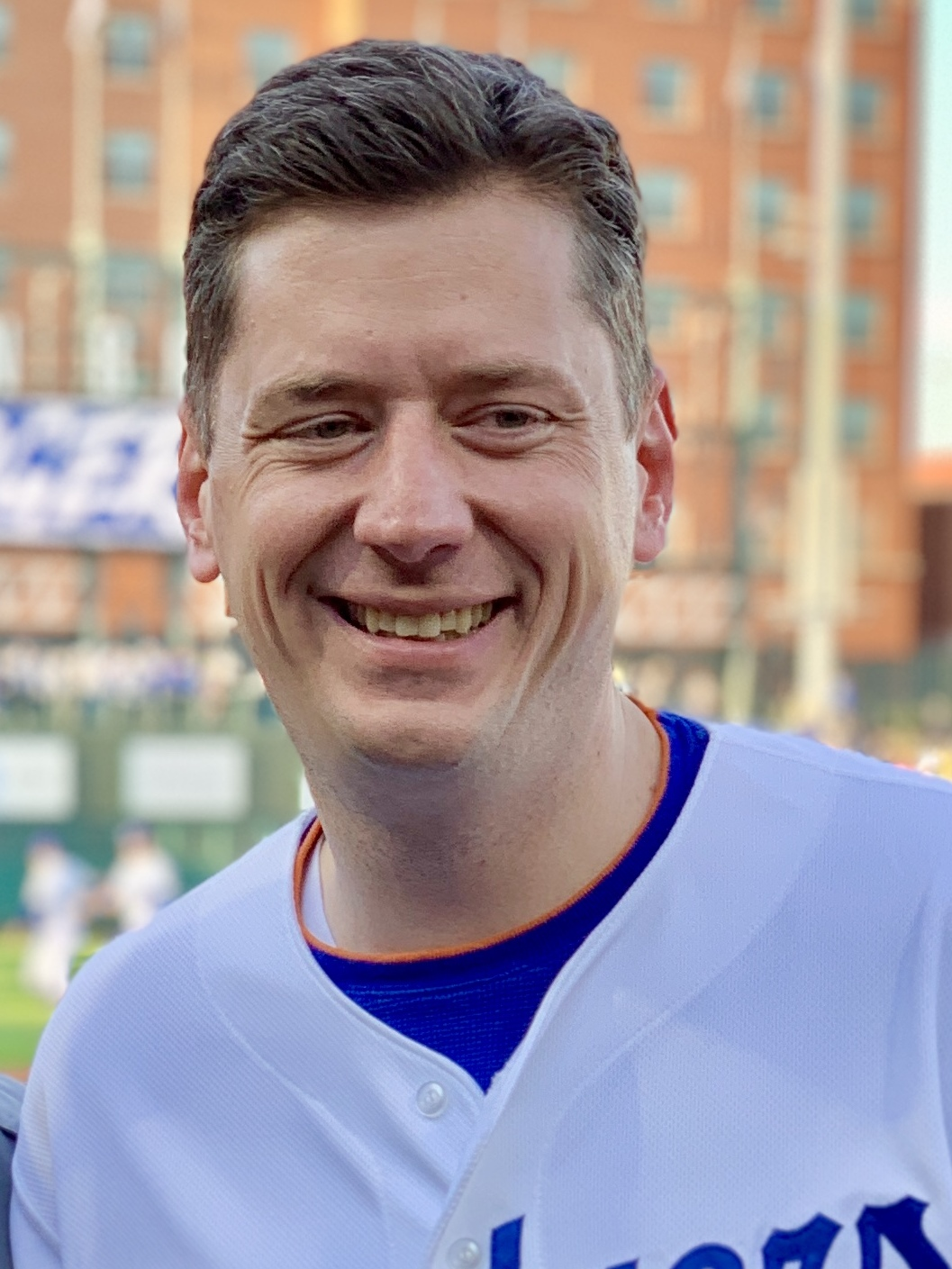

Candidate	David Holt	Matthew Pallares
Popular vote	33,625	5,253
Percentage	86.49%	13.51%
- Holt: 60–70% 70–80% 80–90% 90–100% Tie No votes
Mayor before election
David Holt
Republican
Elected mayor
David Holt
Republican

The 2026 Oklahoma City mayoral election was held on February 10, 2026, to elect the mayor of Oklahoma City. Incumbent Republican mayor David Holt was easily re-elected to a third term with 86% of the vote in a landslide.

All Oklahoma city municipal elections are non-partisan, but candidates can be affiliated with a political party.

== Background ==
The 2022 Oklahoma City mayoral election resulted in the re-election of mayor David Holt, who was first elected in 2018. There are no term limits for the office of mayor in Oklahoma City, with mayors elected to four-year terms.

Candidate filing took place from December 1–3, 2025, with Holt and Matthew Pallares both filing for office. The election took place on February 10, 2026. Holt won the election with over 85% of the vote.

== General election ==
=== Candidates ===
==== Declared ====
- David Holt, incumbent mayor (2018–present)
- Matthew Pallares, former Bethany City Council candidate

=== Endorsements ===
David Holt

Labor unions

- AFSCME Local 2406
- Fraternal Order of Police Lodge 123
- International Association of Fire Fighters Local 157

Newspapers

- Black Chronicle
- The Oklahoman

=== Results ===
2026 Oklahoma City mayoral election
Candidate	Votes	%
David Holt (incumbent)	33,625	86.49
Matthew Pallares	5,253	13.51
Total votes	38,878	100.00

==== By county ====
County	David Holt	%	Matthew Pallares	%	Total
Oklahoma	29,082	86.5%	4,543	13.5%	33,625
Canadian	2,185	86.4%	344	13.6%	2,529
Cleveland	2,354	86.5%	366	13.5%	2,720
Pottawatomie	4	100.0%	0	0.0%	4
Total	33,625	86.49%	5,253	13.51%	38,878

== See also ==
- 2026 Oklahoma elections
