= 2014 Oklahoma City mayoral election =

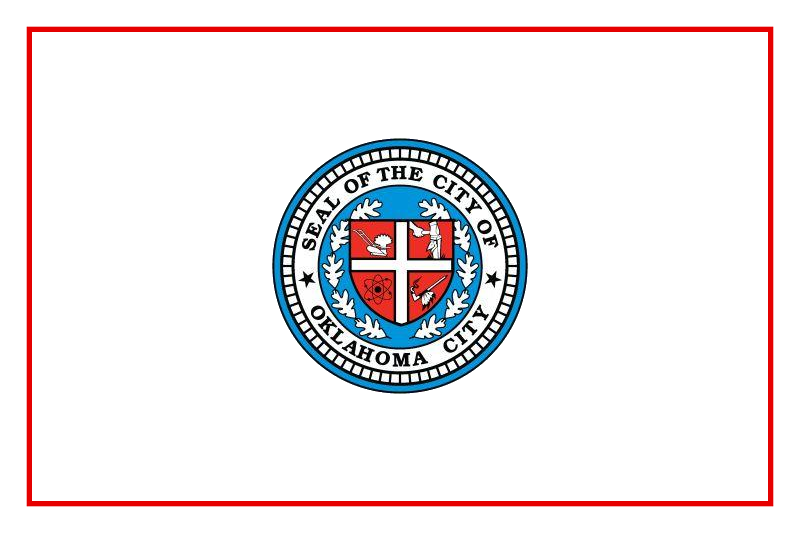
- March 4, 2014
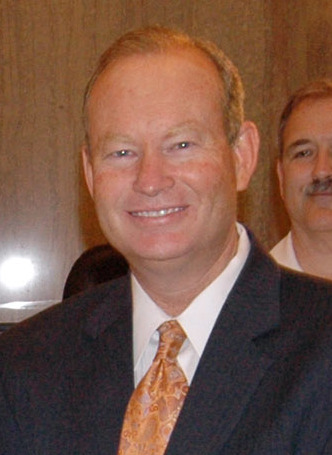

Nominee	Mick Cornett	Ed Shadid
Party	Nonpartisan	Nonpartisan
Popular vote	31,514	15,749
Percentage	65.70%	32.84%
Mayor before election
Mick Cornett
Nonpartisan
Elected Mayor
Mick Cornett
Nonpartisan

The 2014 Oklahoma City mayoral election took place on March 4, 2014. Incumbent Mayor Mick Cornett, a Republican, ran for re-election to a fourth term. He was challenged by City Councilman Ed Shadid. Cornett remained popular, and was elected to his fourth and final term as Mayor with 66 percent of the vote, avoiding the need for a runoff, and defeating Shadid, who won 33 percent.

== Primary election ==
=== Candidates ===
- Mick Cornett, incumbent Mayor
- Ed Shadid, City Councilman
- Joe Sarge Nelson, retired businessman
- Phil Hughes, electrical engineer

=== Campaign ===
Shadid announced that he would run for Mayor on June 24, 2013, and emphasizing that he would focus his campaign on "honesty, transparency, unprecedented public participation and neighborhood over special interests." He criticized Cornett for launching ambitious city projects, like the Oklahoma City Streetcar, without adequate public accountability, and for leaving some neighborhoods behind. Cornett launched his campaign for re-election on August 5, 2013, noting that "we're just getting started," and that he would continue to focus on investing in public safety and quality.

The Oklahoman endorsed Cornett for re-election, writing, "A vote for incumbent Mick Cornett would be a vote for continued progress, a sign that residents like the way the city is being run and the way Cornett, as the face of the city, represents us." The paper noted that Cornett was "the latest in a line of great mayors who have helped restore the central city as a hub for entertainment, housing, hotels and the arts." It criticized Shadid, noting that a vote for him "would be an endorsement of negativism, regress, class envy and division."

=== Polling ===
Poll source	Date(s) administered	Sample size (Note: Key: A – all adults RV – registered voters LV – likely voters V – unclear)	Margin of error	Mick Cornett	Ed Shadid	Joe Sarge Nelson	Phil Hughes	Undecided
SoonerPoll	February 17–19, 2014	980 (LV)	± 3%	64%	19%	6%	2%	9%
SoonerPoll	February 27 – March 1, 2014	513 (LV)	± 4.3%	63%	25%	1%	1%	9%

=== Results ===
2014 Oklahoma City mayoral election results
Party	Candidate	Votes	%
Nonpartisan	Mick Cornett (inc.)	31,514	65.70%
Nonpartisan	Ed Shadid	15,749	32.84%
Nonpartisan	Joe Sarge Nelson	368	0.77%
Nonpartisan	Phil Hughes	332	0.69%
Total votes		47,963	100.00%
