= James P. Allen (politician) =

American politician

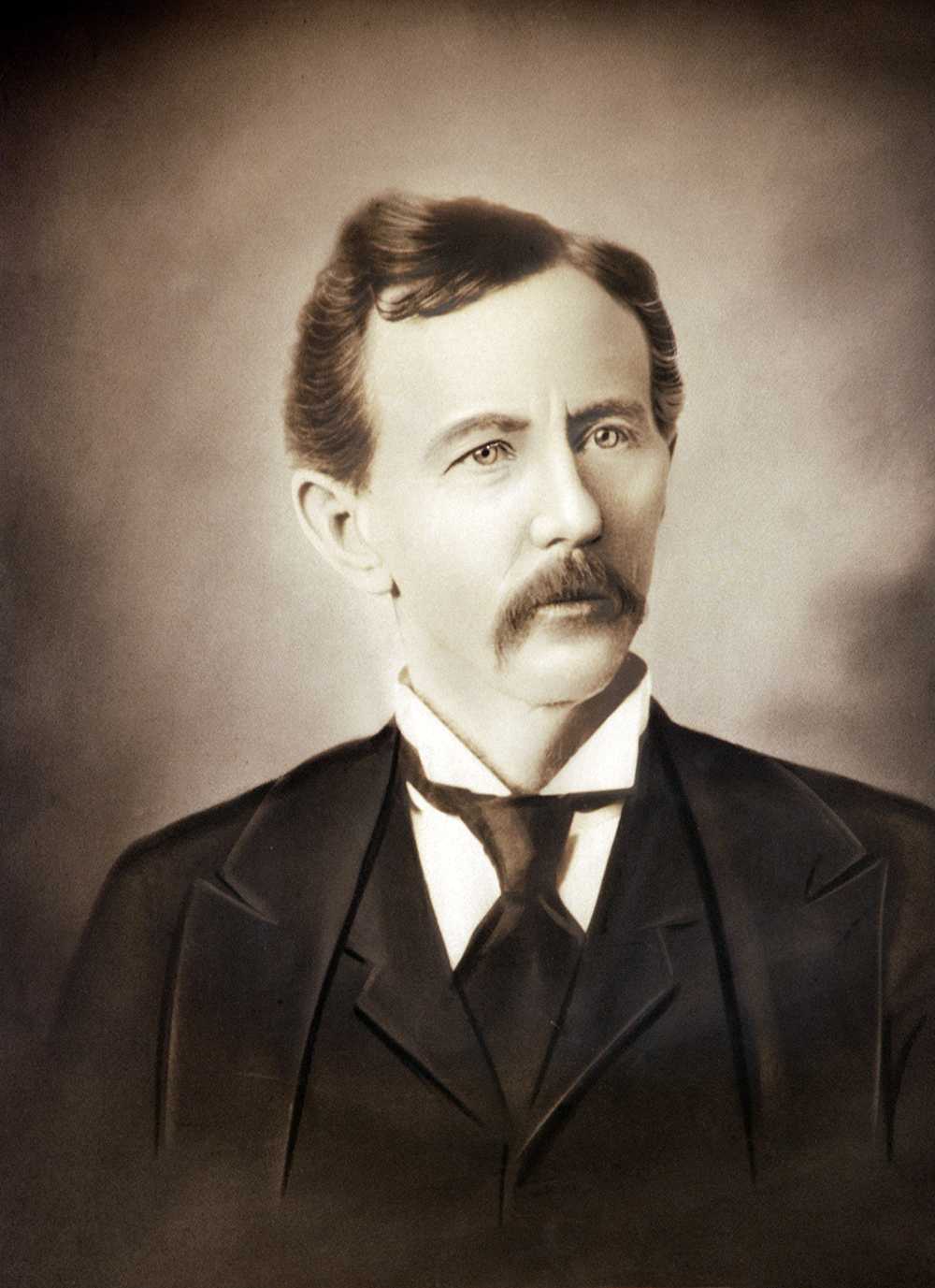
- Allen in 1894

9th Mayor of Oklahoma City
- In office April 12, 1897 – April 10, 1899
- Preceded by: Charles G. Jones
- Succeeded by: Robert E. Lee Van Winkle

Member of the Mississippi State Senate from the 23rd district
- In office January 5, 1892 – January 7, 1896
- Preceded by: Presley Groves
- Succeeded by: N. Q. Adams

Personal details
- Born: August 18, 1848 Attala County, Mississippi, U.S.
- Died: March 21, 1922 (aged 73) Oklahoma City, Oklahoma, U.S.
- Party: Democratic
- Children: 4

Major James P. Allen (August 18, 1848 - March 21, 1922) was an American lawyer, Democratic politician, and jurist who served as Mayor of Oklahoma City between 1897 and 1899. He was also a Mississippi state senator from 1892 to 1896.

== Biography ==
James P. Allen was born in Attala County, Mississippi on August 18, 1848 to wealthy planters. He attended a law school in Jackson, Mississippi. At the beginning of the Civil War, Allen joined the Confederate States Army, and served throughout the war, ending with the rank of Major. Allen then began a law practice in Kosciusko, Mississippi. He was a member of the Jeffersonian Democratic Party. In 1891, J. P. Allen was elected to represent the 23rd District in the Mississippi State Senate for the 1892 and 1894 sessions. He was succeeded in the Senate by N. Q. Adams. Allen moved to Oklahoma in 1895.

Allen quickly opened a law office in Oklahoma City. He had worked as an attorney and judge before his election as Mayor of Oklahoma City in 1897. He was in office between April 12, 1897, and April 10, 1899. He helped bring Frisco Railroad to Oklahoma City, supported the growth of industry, and supported the founding of St. Anthony Hospital. He also saw the establishment of the first city hall and feuded with two saloon owners, P. T. and J. T. Hill. After leaving office as mayor, Allen became the probate judge of Oklahoma County in 1902. He died at 10:20 PM on March 21, 1922, at his Oklahoma City residence.

== Personal life ==
Allen was a member of the Presbyterian Church. He was also a member of the Freemasons. He was married and had one son, Walter C. Allen, and three daughters (who respectively married F. P. Johnson, W. C. Wright, and A. C. Bennett).
