= Robert E. Lee Van Winkle =

American politician

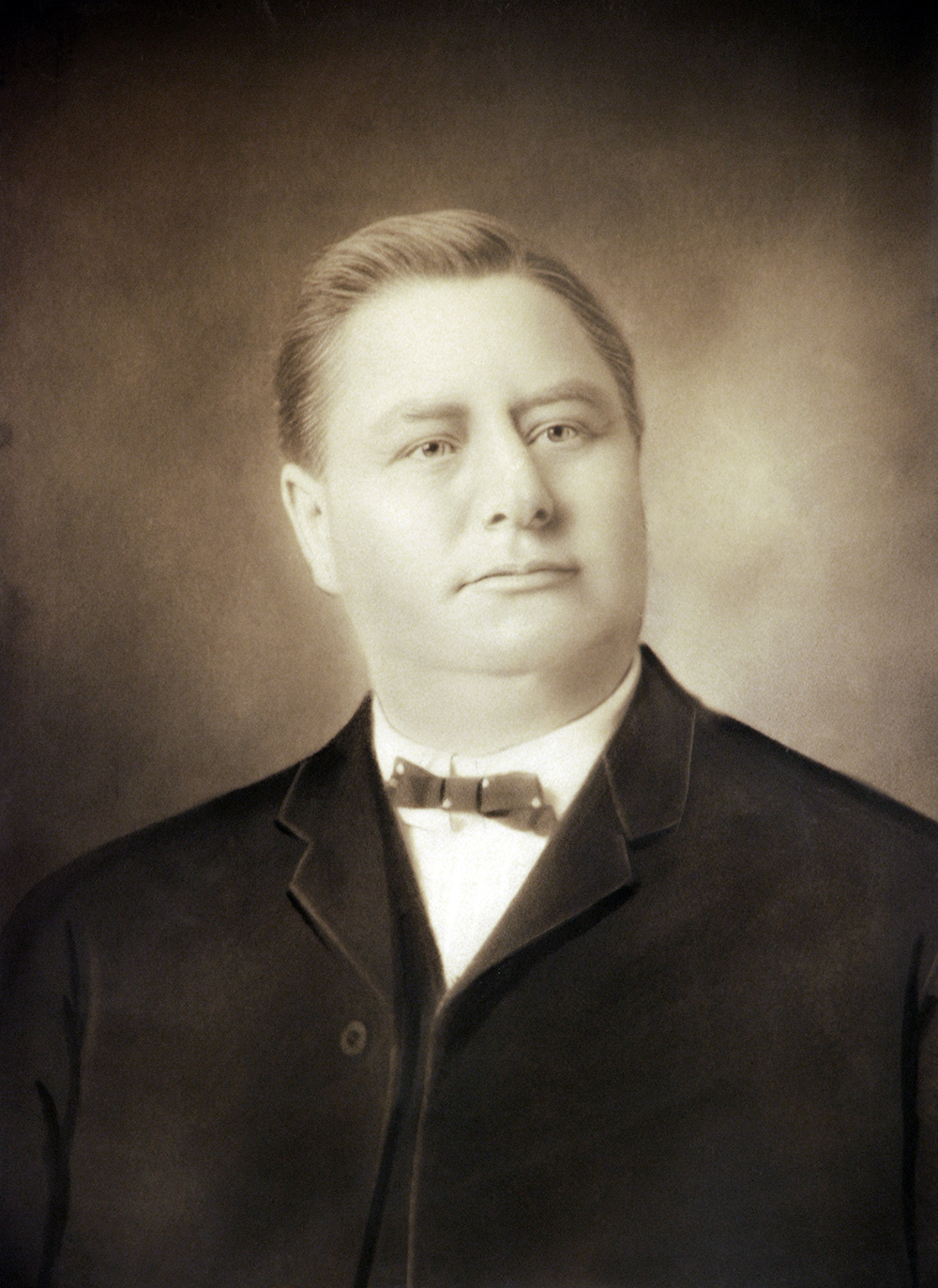
- Van Winkle in 1901

10th and 12th Mayor of Oklahoma City
- In office April 13, 1903 – April 10, 1905
- Preceded by: Charles G. Jones
- Succeeded by: Joseph Fife Messenbaugh
- In office April 10, 1899 – April 8, 1901
- Preceded by: James P. Allen
- Succeeded by: Charles G. Jones

Personal details
- Born: July 17, 1862 Benton County, Arkansas
- Died: January 4, 1928 (aged 65)

Robert E. Lee Van Winkle was an American politician who served two nonconsecutive terms as the Mayor of Oklahoma City first between 1899 and 1901, and later between 1903 and 1905. He was named after Robert E. Lee.

== Early life and family ==
Robert E. Lee Van Winkle was born July 17, 1862, to Peter Van Winkle and his wife Temperance Miller in Benton County, Arkansas. Peter Van Winkle was born in 1814 in New York City into a Dutch family that immigrated to New Amsterdam in 1619. He later moved to Arkansas, and built a lumber mill and plantation style home in Benton County and owned at least 12 slaves. A supporter of the Confederacy, Peter named his children Jefferson Davis Van Winkle, after Jefferson Davis, and Robert E. Lee Van Winkle, after Robert E. Lee.

Robert Van Winkle's family fled to Bowie County, Texas when their estate was razed during the American Civil War. After the war his family returned and by the 1870s the lumber mill dominated the regional market.

== Mayor of Oklahoma City ==
Van Winkle moved to Oklahoma City in 1899 and formed the Oklahoma Sash and Door Company, and was an influential member of the city's lumber industry. He served his first term as Mayor of Oklahoma City between April 10, 1899, and April 8, 1901. He served his second term between April 13, 1903, and April 10, 1905. During his second term he worked with the Oklahoma City Council to pass over 120 ordinances. He died on January 4, 1928.
