= Dan Fisher (Oklahoma politician) =

American politician

Member of the Oklahoma House of Representatives from the 60 district
- In office 2012–2016
- Preceded by: Purcy Walker (D)
- Succeeded by: Rhonda Baker (R)

Personal details
- Party: Republican

Dan Fisher (born 1958) is a former Republican member of the Oklahoma House of Representatives representing District 60 from 2012 to 2016. Fisher did not seek re-election to the Oklahoma House of Representatives in 2016.

On August 22, 2017, Fisher declared that he would run for governor of Oklahoma in 2018.

== Background ==
Dan Fisher grew up in Van Buren, Arkansas. Fisher earned his B. A. in Secondary Education and Mathematics from Arkansas Tech University. In 1983, he became the pastor of the Immanuel Baptist Church in Poteau, OK where he served for 9 years. In 1992 he became the senior pastor of Trinity Baptist Church in Yukon, Oklahoma.

Dan is an avid student of U.S. history and leads frequent tours on the Black-Robed Regiment to historic locations like Washington D.C., Mt. Vernon, Gettysburg (and other Civil War battlefields), Boston, Plymouth, and Lexington/Concord. Dan is on the leadership team of the Oklahoma City Tea Party and is a frequent speaker at tea parties around the state. He is a member of the High Noon Club and serves on the boards of Bott Radio Network, Reclaiming America for Christ, and Vision America. Dan is a published author.

He and his wife, Pam, have been married for 36 years and have two children and four grandchildren.

== Oklahoma House of Representatives ==
Fisher ran in the 2012 election for Oklahoma House of Representatives District 60. Fisher defeated Matt White with 54.4% of the vote in the Republican primary on June 26 and defeated Kendra Menz-Kimble in the general election with 62.3% of the vote, which took place on November 6, 2012.

In 2014, Incumbent Dan Fisher was unopposed in the Republican primary. Fisher was unchallenged in the general election.

== 2018 Oklahoma gubernatorial election ==
Dan Fisher ran for Governor of Oklahoma on a platform of abolishing abortion, asserting state sovereignty, auditing everything, and restoring proper government. Fisher placed fourth in a ten-candidate primary. He finished behind Kevin Stitt, former Oklahoma City mayor Mick Cornett, and Lt. Gov. Todd Lamb.
