= 2018 Oklahoma gubernatorial election =

- November 6, 2018
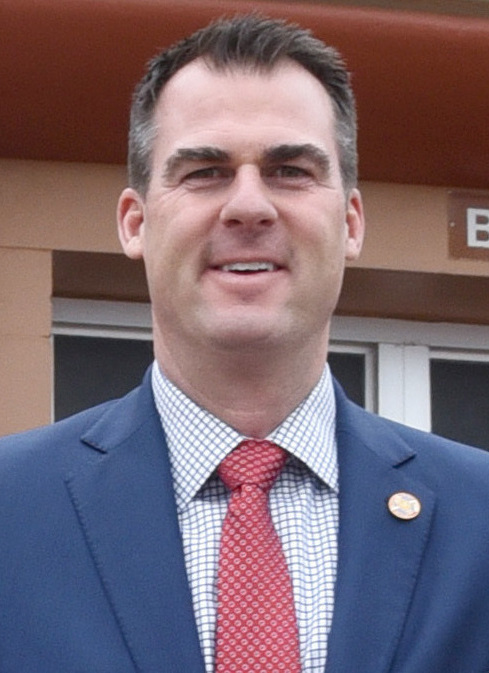

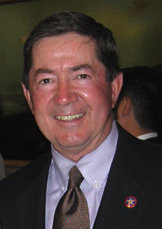
| Nominee | Kevin Stitt | Drew Edmondson |
| Party | Republican | Democratic |
| Popular vote | 644,579 | 500,973 |
| Percentage | 54.33% | 42.23% |
- Stitt: 40–50% 50–60% 60–70% 70–80% 80–90% ≥90% Edmondson: 40–50% 50–60% 60–70% 70–80% 80–90% ≥90% Tie No votes
Governor before election
Mary Fallin
Republican
Elected Governor
Kevin Stitt
Republican

The 2018 Oklahoma gubernatorial election was held on November 6, 2018, to elect the next governor of Oklahoma. Incumbent Republican governor Mary Fallin was term-limited, and was prohibited by the Constitution of Oklahoma from seeking a third term. Republican Businessman Kevin Stitt was elected with 54.3% of the vote, defeating Democratic nominee and former Oklahoma attorney general Drew Edmondson.

Primary elections occurred on June 26, 2018. Edmondson won the Democratic nomination outright. Stitt, however, faced a runoff election against former Oklahoma City mayor Mick Cornett. On August 28, 2018, Stitt won the Republican primary runoff and became the Republican nominee for the office. The Libertarian Party also held a primary, which advanced to a runoff, with Chris Powell, a former chair of the Libertarian Party of Oklahoma, winning the nomination.

Stitt won the general election with 54.33% of the vote. This was the first time ever that the Libertarian Party was on the ballot in a gubernatorial election in Oklahoma, and the only time since 1986 that a candidate from the incumbent president's party was elected Governor of Oklahoma.

A member of the Cherokee Nation, Stitt became the first tribally enrolled Native American to serve as governor of a U.S. state. Despite his victory, Stitt lost four counties that voted Republican in the 2016 U.S. presidential race: Cherokee, Cleveland, Muskogee, and Oklahoma.

== Republican primary ==
=== Candidates ===
==== Nominated ====
- Kevin Stitt, businessman

==== Eliminated in the primary runoff ====
- Mick Cornett, former mayor of Oklahoma City

==== Eliminated in the initial primary ====
- Christopher Barnett, businessman
- Dan Fisher, former state representative
- Eric Foutch, veteran
- Barry Gowdy, nurse
- Gary Jones, Oklahoma State Auditor and Inspector
- Todd Lamb, Lieutenant Governor of Oklahoma
- Gary Richardson, former United States Attorney for the Eastern District of Oklahoma, nominee for OK-02 in 1978 and 1980, and independent candidate for governor in 2002
- Blake "Cowboy" Stephens, rancher and educator

=== Endorsements ===
Mick Cornett

Mayors

- Jay Adams, former mayor of Mustang, Oklahoma
- Dewey F. Bartlett Jr., former mayor of Tulsa, Oklahoma
- Mike Burdge, mayor of Sand Springs, Oklahoma
- Brian Cathey, mayor of Atoka, Oklahoma
- Dale Copeland, mayor of Bartlesville, Oklahoma
- Patrice Douglas, former mayor of Edmond, Oklahoma
- Fred Fitch, mayor of Lawton, Oklahoma
- Charles Lamb, former mayor of Edmond, Oklahoma
- Brian Linley, mayor of Del City, Oklahoma
- Saundra Naifeh, former mayor of Edmond, Oklahoma
- Homer Nicholson, mayor of Ponca City, Oklahoma
- Kim Petersen, mayor of Guymon, Oklahoma
- Hank Ross, former mayor of Chickasha, Oklahoma
- Bill Shewey, mayor of Enid, Oklahoma
- Jeff Shockley, mayor of Guymon, Oklahoma
- Jack Smiley, mayor of Altus, Oklahoma
- Craig Thurmond, mayor of Broken Arrow, Oklahoma
- Jimmy Trammell, mayor of Pryor Creek, Oklahoma
- Matt White, mayor of El Reno, Oklahoma

Individuals

- Gary Richardson, former Eastern District Attorney and candidate for governor in 2002 & 2018

Organizations

- Oklahomans for Public Education

Newspapers

- The Oklahoman
- Tulsa World
- The Yukon Review
Todd Lamb

U.S. representatives

- Steve Russell (OK-05)

Individuals

- Tommy Franks, retired U.S. Army general
- Donald Trump Jr., businessman and son of U.S. president Donald Trump

Organizations

- Oklahoma Farm Bureau
Gary Richardson

Individuals

- Monica Deon, former Tulsa County Donald Trump presidential campaign, 2016 volunteer coordinator
- Thomas P. Stafford, Apollo 10 commander

Organizations

- The Edmond Republican GROUP
- Sooner Politics News
Kevin Stitt

U.S. executive branch officials

- Mike Pence, 48th vice president of the United States
- Donald Trump, 45th president of the United States

U.S. senators

- Tom Coburn, former U.S. senator from Oklahoma
- Ted Cruz, U.S. senator from Texas
- Jim Inhofe, U.S. senator from Oklahoma
- Rick Santorum, former U.S. senator from Pennsylvania

U.S. representatives

- Bill Brewster, former congressman (Democratic)
- Frank Lucas (OK-3)
- Wes Watkins, former congressman

Governors

- Mary Fallin, 27th governor of Oklahoma

Mayors

- Mick Cornett, 35th mayor of Oklahoma City

Individuals

- Blake Stephens, rancher, educator and candidate for governor of Oklahoma in 2018

Organizations

- IAFF Local 176
- National Federation of Independent Business

Newspapers

- The Oklahoman
- Tulsa World

=== First round ===
==== Polling ====
| Poll source | Date(s) administered | Sample size | Margin of error | Mick Cornett | Dan Fisher | Gary Jones | Todd Lamb | Gary Richardson | Kevin Stitt | Other | Undecided |
|---|---|---|---|---|---|---|---|---|---|---|---|
| Right Strategy Group (R) | June 6–7, 2018 | 435 | ± 4.5% | 21% | 4% | 2% | 20% | 6% | 20% | – | 28% |
| Oklahoma Strategic Solutions (R-Richardson) | May 22–23, 2018 | 500 | ± 4.4% | 13% | 4% | 3% | 20% | 13% | 17% | – | 30% |
| Right Strategy Group (R) | May 22–23, 2018 | 409 | ± 5.0% | 20% | 4% | 3% | 20% | 4% | 21% | – | 29% |
| SoonerPoll | May 15–23, 2018 | 319 | – | 20% | 3% | 4% | 23% | 3% | 14% | 1% | 31% |
| Magellan Strategies | April 18–19 and 22, 2018 | 644 | ± 3.9% | 17% | 5% | 5% | 19% | 12% | 19% | – | 23% |
| SoonerPoll | March 14–22, 2018 | 294 | – | 22% | 4% | 3% | 21% | 7% | 8% | – | 36% |
| Oklahoma Strategic Solutions (R-Richardson) | March 9, 2018 | 500 | ± 4.4% | 15% | 2% | 3% | 14% | 10% | 8% | – | 48% |
| SoonerPoll | January 4–9, 2018 | 213 | – | 24% | 4% | 3% | 18% | 9% | 3% | – | 39% |

Hypothetical polling

| Poll source | Date(s) administered | Sample size | Margin of error | Jim Bridenstine | Todd Lamb | Scott Pruitt | Undecided |
|---|---|---|---|---|---|---|---|
| SoonerPoll | September 1–15, 2017 | 403 | ± 4.9% | 19% | 33% | 16% | 32% |

==== Results ====
Initial primary results by county: Cornett: 20–30%; 30–40%; 40–50%; Stitt: 20–30%; 30–40%; Lamb: 20–30%; 30–40%; 40–50%; Fisher: 20–30%

Republican primary results
| Party | Candidate | Votes | % |
|---|---|---|---|
| Republican | Mick Cornett | 132,806 | 29.3 |
| Republican | Kevin Stitt | 110,479 | 24.4 |
| Republican | Todd Lamb | 107,985 | 23.9 |
| Republican | Dan Fisher | 35,818 | 7.9 |
| Republican | Gary Jones | 25,243 | 5.6 |
| Republican | Gary Richardson | 18,185 | 4.0 |
| Republican | Blake Stephens | 12,211 | 2.7 |
| Republican | Christopher Barnett | 5,240 | 1.2 |
| Republican | Barry Gowdy | 2,347 | 0.5 |
| Republican | Eric Foutch | 2,292 | 0.5 |
| Total votes | | 452,606 | 100.0 |

=== Runoff ===
==== Campaign finance ====
Pre-runoff report due August 20, 2018
| Candidate | Total raised | Total spent | Total cash-on-hand |
|---|---|---|---|
| Kevin Stitt | $6,542,863.91 | $6,018,662.13 | $368,557.72 |
| Mick Cornett | $3,242,795.74 | $2,826,305.70 | $336,691.50 |

==== Polling ====
| Poll source | Date(s) administered | Sample size | Margin of error | Mick Cornett | Kevin Stitt | Undecided |
|---|---|---|---|---|---|---|
| Remington (R) | August 1–2, 2018 | 1,757 | ± 2.3% | 37% | 47% | 16% |
| Right Strategy Group (R) | August 1–2, 2018 | 385 | ± 5.0% | 33% | 41% | 26% |
| SoonerPoll | July 18–20, 2018 | 483 | ± 4.5% | 37% | 37% | 25% |

==== Results ====
Primary runoff results by county: Stitt: 50–60%; 60–70%; 70–80%; Cornett: 50–60%

Republican primary runoff results
| Party | Candidate | Votes | % |
|---|---|---|---|
| Republican | Kevin Stitt | 164,892 | 54.56 |
| Republican | Mick Cornett | 137,316 | 45.44 |
| Total votes | | 302,208 | 100.0 |

== Democratic primary ==
=== Candidates ===
==== Nominated ====
- Drew Edmondson, former attorney general of Oklahoma and candidate for governor of Oklahoma in 2010

==== Eliminated in the primary ====
- Connie Johnson, former state senator and nominee for the U.S. Senate in 2014

==== Withdrew ====
- Scott Inman, state representative
- Norman Jay Brown, auto mechanic

==== Declined ====
- Dan Boren, former U.S. representative
- Joe Dorman, former state representative and nominee for governor in 2014

=== Endorsements ===
Drew Edmondson

Governors

- David Boren, 21st governor of Oklahoma, former president of University of Oklahoma, former US senator

Mayors

- Eric Garcetti, 42nd mayor of Los Angeles

State representatives

- Scott Inman, minority leader of the Oklahoma House of Representatives and candidate for governor of Oklahoma in 2018

Newspapers

- The Tulsa World, daily newspaper for Tulsa, Oklahoma

Individuals

- Norman Jay Brown, auto mechanic and candidate for governor of Oklahoma in 2018

Organizations

- Oklahoma Education Association
- Oklahoma Public Employees Association

=== Polling ===
| Poll source | Date(s) administered | Sample size | Margin of error | Drew Edmondson | Connie Johnson | Undecided |
|---|---|---|---|---|---|---|
| Right Strategy Group (R) | June 6–7, 2018 | – | – | 45% | 11% | 45% |
| SoonerPoll | May 15–23, 2018 | 297 | ± 5.7% | 44% | 14% | 43% |

Hypothetical polling

with Norman Brown

| Poll source | Date(s) administered | Sample size | Margin of error | Norman Brown | Drew Edmondson | Connie Johnson | Undecided |
|---|---|---|---|---|---|---|---|
| SoonerPoll | March 14–22, 2018 | 264 | – | 4% | 34% | 13% | 50% |
| SoonerPoll | January 4–9, 2018 | 162 | – | 4% | 40% | 21% | 35% |

=== Results ===
Results by county: Edmondson: 50–60%; 60–70%; 70–80%

Democratic primary results
| Party | Candidate | Votes | % |
|---|---|---|---|
| Democratic | Drew Edmondson | 242,764 | 61.4 |
| Democratic | Connie Johnson | 152,730 | 38.6 |
| Total votes | | 395,494 | 100.0 |

== Libertarian primary ==
=== Candidates ===
==== Nominated ====
- Chris Powell, former chair of the Oklahoma Libertarian Party and candidate for Oklahoma County Clerk in 2016

==== Eliminated in the primary runoff ====
- Rex L. Lawhorn, former chair of the Oklahoma Americans Elect Party and Oklahoma State Director for Our America Initiative

==== Eliminated in the initial primary ====
- Joe Exotic, zoo operator

==== Endorsements ====
Chris Powell

Newspapers

- The City Sentinel, monthly newspaper for Oklahoma City, Oklahoma

Individuals

- Jimmy Cook, former chair of the Oklahoma Libertarian Party
- Steve Galpin, former chair of the Oklahoma Libertarian Party
- Tim Gillespie, founder of the Oklahoma 2nd Amendment Association
- Frank Grove, president, Drug Reform Network of Oklahoma
- Tina Kelly, former chair of the Oklahoma Libertarian Party
- Tom Laurent, former chair of the Oklahoma Libertarian Party, former member of the Libertarian National Committee
- Robert T. Murphy, former chair of the Oklahoma Libertarian Party, former member of the Libertarian National Committee, nominee for the U.S. Senate in 2016
- Angela O'Dell, former chair of the Oklahoma Libertarian Party
- D. Frank Robinson, first chair of the Oklahoma Libertarian Party, founding member of the national Libertarian Party
- Norma Sapp, director, Oklahoma chapter of the National Organization for the Reform of Marijuana Laws
- Ken Young, chair of Oklahoma State Board of Cosmetology

=== First round ===
==== Results ====
Initial primary results by county: Powell: 100%; 80–90%; 70–80%; 60–70%; 50–60%; 40–50%; Powell/Lawhorn tie: <40%; 40–50%; 50%; Lawhorn: 40–50%; 50–60%; 60–70%; 70–80%; 100%; Exotic: 40–50%; 70–80%; 100%; No votes: No Votes

Libertarian primary results
| Party | Candidate | Votes | % |
|---|---|---|---|
| Libertarian | Chris Powell | 1,740 | 48.9 |
| Libertarian | Rex L. Lawhorn | 1,154 | 32.4 |
| Libertarian | Joe Exotic | 664 | 18.7 |
| Total votes | | 3,558 | 100% |

=== Runoff ===
==== Campaign finance ====
Pre-runoff report due August 20, 2018
| Candidate | Total raised | Total spent | Total cash-on-hand |
|---|---|---|---|
| Chris Powell | $10,142.88 | $6,991.02 | $3,017.51 |
| Rex L. Lawhorn | $4,575.00 | $5,286.87 | ($736.87) |

==== Results ====
Primary runoff results by county: Powell: 100%; 80–90%; 70–80%; 60–70%; 50–60%; Powell/Lawhorn tie: 50%; Lawhorn: 50–60%; 60–70%; 70–80%; 100%; No votes: No votes

Libertarian primary runoff results
| Party | Candidate | Votes | % |
|---|---|---|---|
| Libertarian | Chris Powell | 547 | 59.1 |
| Libertarian | Rex L. Lawhorn | 379 | 40.9 |
| Total votes | | 926 | 100.0 |

== General election ==
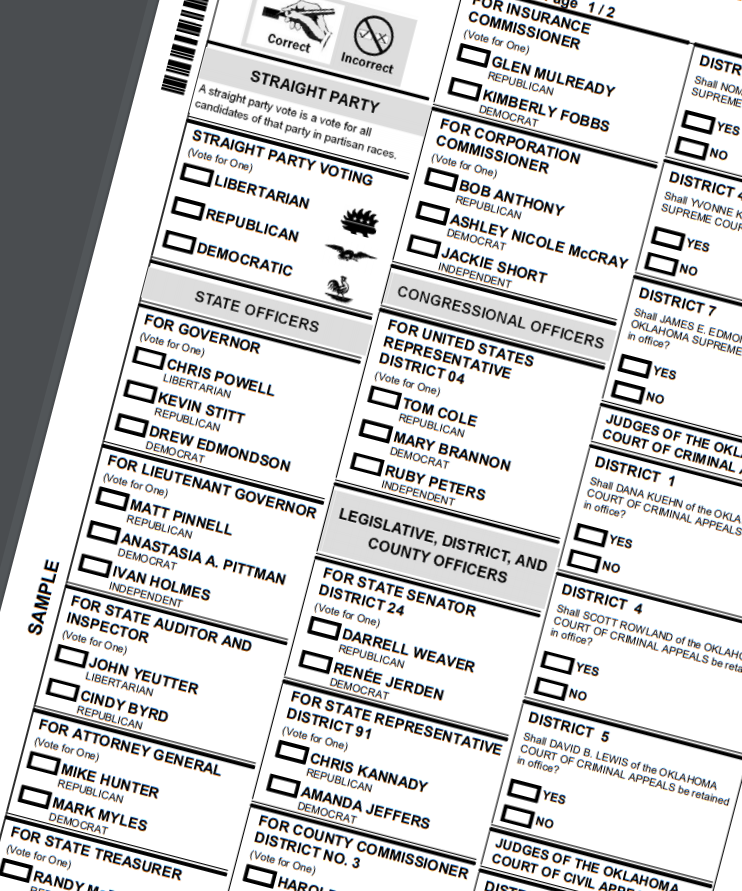
Oklahoma general election ballot for 2018

Oklahoma determines ballot order by a random drawing which took place for this election cycle on July 12, resulting in the Libertarian Party being listed first, Republicans second, and Democrats third.

=== Debates ===
- Complete video of debate , September 24, 2018

=== Predictions ===
| Source | Ranking | As of |
|---|---|---|
| The Cook Political Report | Tossup | October 26, 2018 |
| The Washington Post | Lean R | November 5, 2018 |
| FiveThirtyEight | Likely R | November 5, 2018 |
| Rothenberg Political Report | Lean R | November 1, 2018 |
| Sabato's Crystal Ball | Lean R | November 5, 2018 |
| RealClearPolitics | Lean R | November 4, 2018 |
| Daily Kos | Lean R | November 5, 2018 |
| Fox News (Note: The Fox News Midterm Power Rankings uniquely does not contain a category for Safe/Solid races) | Likely R | November 5, 2018 |
| Politico | Lean R | November 5, 2018 |
| Governing | Lean R | November 5, 2018 |

=== Polling ===
View source data.

| Poll source | Date(s) administered | Sample size | Margin of error | Kevin Stitt (R) | Drew Edmondson (D) | Chris Powell (L) | Undecided |
|---|---|---|---|---|---|---|---|
| SoonerPoll | October 31 – November 3, 2018 | 338 | ± 5.3% | 47% | 44% | 3% | 6% |
| SoonerPoll | October 23–25, 2018 | 447 | ± 4.6% | 46% | 42% | 4% | 8% |
| Magellan Strategies (R) | October 22–23, 2018 | 500 | ± 4.4% | 51% | 44% | 1% | 4% |
| Cole Hargrave Snodgrass (R) | September 25–29, 2018 | 500 | ± 4.3% | 46% | 40% | 4% | – |
| Right Strategy Group (R) | September 25–26, 2018 | 1,058 | ± 3.0% | 47% | 43% | 2% | 8% |
| SoonerPoll | September 5–10, 2018 | 407 | ± 4.9% | 47% | 44% | 3% | 6% |
| Right Strategy Group (R) | August 1–2, 2018 | 737 | ± 4.0% | 41% | 42% | – | 17% |
| SoonerPoll | July 18–20, 2018 | 404 | ± 4.9% | 39% | 40% | – | 21% |
| SoonerPoll | May 15–23, 2018 | 622 | ± 3.9% | 25% | 32% | – | 43% |

Hypothetical polling

with Mick Cornett

| Poll source | Date(s) administered | Sample size | Margin of error | Mick Cornett (R) | Drew Edmondson (D) | Undecided |
|---|---|---|---|---|---|---|
| Right Strategy Group (R) | August 1–2, 2018 | 737 | ± 4.0% | 39% | 39% | 21% |
| SoonerPoll | July 18–20, 2018 | 404 | ± 4.9% | 43% | 35% | 23% |
| SoonerPoll | May 15–23, 2018 | 622 | ± 3.9% | 33% | 27% | 40% |

with Todd Lamb

| Poll source | Date(s) administered | Sample size | Margin of error | Todd Lamb (R) | Drew Edmondson (D) | Undecided |
|---|---|---|---|---|---|---|
| SoonerPoll | May 15–23, 2018 | 622 | ± 3.9% | 33% | 28% | 39% |

=== Results ===

Oklahoma gubernatorial election, 2018
| Party | Candidate | Votes | % | ±% |
|---|---|---|---|---|
| Republican | Kevin Stitt | 644,579 | 54.33% | −1.47% |
| Democratic | Drew Edmondson | 500,973 | 42.23% | +1.22% |
| Libertarian | Chris Powell | 40,833 | 3.44% | N/A |
| Total votes | | 1,186,385 | 100.00% | N/A |
| Republican hold | | | | |

==== By county ====
Stitt won 73 counties, while Edmondson won four. Stitt won 56 counties with at least 60% of the popular vote, 14 counties with at least 70%, and three counties – Beaver, Cimarron, and Ellis – with upwards of 80%. Stitt had the largest margin of victory in Cimarron with 73.09% more votes than Edmondson's 12.27%, the latter's lowest county performance in the election. The largest county per vote count won by Stitt was Tulsa County, home of Tulsa. Oklahoma County, of which Oklahoma City is county seat, was the only county where Stitt failed to acquire three out of every seven votes.

Edmondson won Muskogee by a single vote, and had an 11.84% margin of victory – his only margin of victory above 10% – in Oklahoma County. Edmondson won his four counties with typically narrower margins than that of Stitt, having missed 50% of the popular vote in Muskogee. Powell never came close to winning any counties, but won his highest percentage of votes in Washita County, with 4.97%

| County | Kevin Stitt Republican | | Drew Edmondson Democratic | | Chris Powell Libertarian | | Margin | | Total |
| County | Votes | % | Votes | % | Votes | % | Votes | % | Total |
|---|---|---|---|---|---|---|---|---|---|
| Adair | 3,187 | 61.61% | 1,745 | 33.73% | 241 | 4.66% | 1,442 | 27.88% | 5,173 |
| Alfalfa | 1,333 | 74.01% | 391 | 21.71% | 77 | 4.28% | 942 | 52.30% | 1,801 |
| Atoka | 2,789 | 69.05% | 1,155 | 28.6% | 95 | 2.35% | 1,634 | 40.46% | 4,039 |
| Beaver | 1,454 | 80.82% | 272 | 15.12% | 73 | 4.06% | 1,182 | 65.70% | 1,799 |
| Beckham | 4,061 | 71.18% | 1,396 | 24.47% | 248 | 4.35% | 2,665 | 46.71% | 5,705 |
| Blaine | 1,941 | 65.73% | 889 | 30.10% | 123 | 4.17% | 1,052 | 35.62% | 2,953 |
| Bryan | 7,301 | 64.33% | 3,746 | 33.01% | 302 | 2.66% | 3,555 | 31.32% | 11,349 |
| Caddo | 4,047 | 54.97% | 3,043 | 41.33% | 272 | 3.69% | 1,004 | 13.64% | 7,362 |
| Canadian | 27,410 | 59.65% | 16,744 | 36.44% | 1,797 | 3.91% | 10,666 | 23.21% | 45,951 |
| Carter | 9,090 | 64.91% | 4,445 | 31.74% | 469 | 3.35% | 4,645 | 33.17% | 14,004 |
| Cherokee | 6,336 | 45.58% | 6,970 | 50.14% | 595 | 4.28% | -634 | -4.56% | 13,901 |
| Choctaw | 2,634 | 65.28% | 1,286 | 31.87% | 115 | 2.85% | 1,348 | 33.41% | 4,035 |
| Cimarron | 682 | 85.36% | 98 | 12.27% | 19 | 2.38% | 584 | 73.09% | 799 |
| Cleveland | 42,268 | 45.87% | 46,648 | 50.62% | 3,231 | 3.51% | -4,380 | -4.75% | 92,147 |
| Coal | 1,127 | 61.05% | 659 | 35.70% | 60 | 3.25% | 468 | 25.35% | 1,846 |
| Comanche | 13,180 | 49.66% | 12,336 | 46.48% | 1,027 | 3.87% | 844 | 3.18% | 26,543 |
| Cotton | 1,312 | 65.44% | 598 | 29.83% | 95 | 4.74% | 714 | 35.61% | 2,005 |
| Craig | 2,863 | 60.40% | 1,713 | 36.14% | 164 | 3.46% | 1,150 | 24.26% | 4,740 |
| Creek | 14,870 | 65.53% | 7,048 | 31.06% | 775 | 3.42% | 7,822 | 34.47% | 22,693 |
| Custer | 5,239 | 63.21% | 2,715 | 33.16% | 334 | 4.03% | 2,524 | 30.45% | 8,288 |
| Delaware | 8,543 | 65.21% | 4,114 | 31.40% | 444 | 3.39% | 4,429 | 33.81% | 13,101 |
| Dewey | 1,404 | 79.41% | 315 | 17.82% | 49 | 2.77% | 1,089 | 61.60% | 1,768 |
| Ellis | 1,186 | 80.30% | 236 | 15.98% | 55 | 3.72% | 950 | 64.32% | 1,477 |
| Garfield | 11,008 | 63.36% | 5,613 | 32.31% | 754 | 4.34% | 5,395 | 31.05% | 17,375 |
| Garvin | 5,140 | 64.91% | 2,510 | 31.70% | 269 | 3.40% | 2,630 | 33.21% | 7,919 |
| Grady | 11,173 | 65.16% | 5,281 | 30.80% | 694 | 4.05% | 5,892 | 34.36% | 17,148 |
| Grant | 1,250 | 73.36% | 378 | 22.18% | 76 | 4.46% | 872 | 51.17% | 1,704 |
| Greer | 946 | 64.22% | 469 | 31.84% | 58 | 3.94% | 477 | 32.38% | 1,473 |
| Harmon | 443 | 59.38% | 277 | 37.13% | 26 | 3.49% | 166 | 22.25% | 746 |
| Harper | 948 | 78.35% | 214 | 17.69% | 48 | 3.97% | 734 | 60.66% | 1,210 |
| Haskell | 2,348 | 63.44% | 1,246 | 33.67% | 107 | 2.89% | 1,102 | 29.78% | 3,701 |
| Hughes | 2,323 | 60.73% | 1,336 | 34.93% | 166 | 4.34% | 987 | 25.80% | 3,825 |
| Jackson | 4,301 | 66.31% | 1,989 | 30.67% | 196 | 3.02% | 2,312 | 35.65% | 6,486 |
| Jefferson | 1,099 | 70.04% | 424 | 27.02% | 46 | 2.93% | 675 | 43.02% | 1,569 |
| Johnston | 1,976 | 65.45% | 962 | 31.86% | 81 | 2.68% | 1,014 | 33.59% | 3,019 |
| Kay | 7,859 | 60.51% | 4,582 | 35.28% | 548 | 4.22% | 3,277 | 25.23% | 12,989 |
| Kingfisher | 3,846 | 75.23% | 1,064 | 20.81% | 202 | 3.95% | 2,782 | 54.42% | 5,112 |
| Kiowa | 1,645 | 60.61% | 972 | 35.81% | 97 | 3.57% | 673 | 24.80% | 2,714 |
| Latimer | 1,774 | 58.80% | 1,125 | 37.25% | 118 | 3.91% | 649 | 21.51% | 3,017 |
| Le Flore | 8,009 | 62.56% | 4,467 | 34.89% | 327 | 2.55% | 3,542 | 27.67% | 12,803 |
| Lincoln | 7,323 | 64.94% | 3,418 | 30.31% | 535 | 4.74% | 3,905 | 34.63% | 11,276 |
| Logan | 9,847 | 62.09% | 5,371 | 33.87% | 641 | 4.04% | 4,476 | 28.22% | 15,859 |
| Love | 1,902 | 68.69% | 808 | 29.18% | 59 | 2.13% | 1,094 | 39.51% | 2,769 |
| Major | 2,177 | 79.28% | 470 | 17.12% | 99 | 3.61% | 1,707 | 62.16% | 2,746 |
| Marshall | 2,943 | 66.66% | 1,351 | 30.60% | 121 | 2.74% | 1,592 | 26.06% | 4,415 |
| Mayes | 7,837 | 60.63% | 4,604 | 35.62% | 486 | 3.76% | 3,233 | 25.01% | 12,927 |
| McClain | 9,021 | 65.35% | 4,286 | 31.05% | 497 | 3.60% | 4,735 | 34.30% | 13,804 |
| McCurtain | 5,178 | 68.43% | 2,211 | 29.22% | 178 | 2.35% | 2,967 | 39.21% | 7,567 |
| McIntosh | 3,612 | 54.56% | 2,785 | 42.07% | 223 | 3.37% | 827 | 12.49% | 6,620 |
| Murray | 2,751 | 62.97% | 1,443 | 33.03% | 175 | 4.01% | 1,308 | 29.94% | 4,369 |
| Muskogee | 9,515 | 48.30% | 9,516 | 48.31% | 668 | 3.39% | -1 | -0.01% | 19,699 |
| Noble | 2,543 | 63.83% | 1,252 | 31.43% | 189 | 4.74% | 1,291 | 32.40% | 3,984 |
| Nowata | 2,319 | 66.14% | 1,016 | 28.98% | 171 | 4.88% | 1,303 | 37.16% | 3,506 |
| Okfuskee | 1,752 | 56.44% | 1,241 | 39.98% | 111 | 3.58% | 511 | 16.46% | 3,104 |
| Oklahoma | 98,994 | 42.38% | 126,667 | 54.22% | 7,938 | 3.40% | -27,673 | -11.85% | 233,599 |
| Okmulgee | 5,846 | 52.96% | 4,849 | 43.93% | 343 | 3.11% | 997 | 9.03% | 11,043 |
| Osage | 8,629 | 56.20% | 6,202 | 40.39% | 524 | 3.21% | 2,427 | 15.81% | 15,355 |
| Ottawa | 4,752 | 55.74% | 3,502 | 41.08% | 271 | 3.18% | 1,250 | 14.66% | 8,525 |
| Pawnee | 3,076 | 62.42% | 1,645 | 33.38% | 207 | 4.20% | 1,431 | 29.04% | 4,928 |
| Payne | 11,193 | 49.18% | 10,650 | 46.80% | 914 | 4.02% | 543 | 2.39% | 22,757 |
| Pittsburg | 7,986 | 59.66% | 4,842 | 36.17% | 557 | 4.16% | 3,144 | 23.49% | 13,385 |
| Pontotoc | 6,233 | 52.43% | 5,293 | 44.52% | 363 | 3.05% | 940 | 7.91% | 11,889 |
| Pottawatomie | 11,996 | 57.06% | 8,093 | 38.50% | 933 | 4.44% | 3,903 | 18.57% | 21,022 |
| Pushmataha | 2,102 | 63.07% | 1,106 | 33.18% | 125 | 3.75% | 996 | 29.88% | 3,333 |
| Roger Mills | 1,157 | 77.13% | 283 | 18.87% | 60 | 4.00% | 874 | 58.27% | 1,500 |
| Rogers | 21,450 | 64.76% | 10,605 | 32.02% | 1,069 | 3.23% | 10,845 | 32.74% | 33,124 |
| Seminole | 3,681 | 55.99% | 2,607 | 39.66% | 286 | 4.35% | 1,074 | 16.34 | 6,574 |
| Sequoyah | 6,695 | 58.31% | 4,480 | 39.02% | 307 | 2.67% | 2,215 | 19.29% | 11,482 |
| Stephens | 9,314 | 67.48% | 4,081 | 29.57% | 407 | 2.95% | 5,233 | 37.91% | 13,802 |
| Texas | 3,097 | 74.84% | 894 | 21.60% | 147 | 3.55% | 2,203 | 53.24% | 4,138 |
| Tillman | 1,315 | 62.89% | 716 | 34.24% | 60 | 2.87% | 599 | 28.65% | 2,091 |
| Tulsa | 101,518 | 50.11% | 95,350 | 47.07% | 5,716 | 2.82% | 6,168 | 3.04% | 202,584 |
| Wagoner | 16,346 | 63.00% | 8,700 | 33.53% | 901 | 3.47% | 7,646 | 29.47% | 25,947 |
| Washington | 11,226 | 62.96% | 6,017 | 33.74% | 588 | 3.30% | 5,209 | 29.21% | 17,831 |
| Washita | 2,653 | 69.72% | 963 | 25.31% | 189 | 4.97% | 1,690 | 44.42% | 3,805 |
| Woods | 1,929 | 67.83% | 797 | 28.02% | 118 | 4.15% | 1,132 | 39.80% | 2,844 |
| Woodward | 4,326 | 73.35% | 1,388 | 23.53% | 184 | 3.12% | 2,938 | 49.81% | 5,898 |

Counties that flipped from Democratic to Republican

- Caddo (largest city: Anadarko)
- Coal (largest city: Coalgate)
- Latimer (largest city: Wilburton)
- Pontotoc (largest city: Ada)

Counties that flipped from Republican to Democratic

- Cleveland (largest city: Norman)
- Oklahoma (largest city: Oklahoma City)

==== By congressional district ====
Stitt won four of five congressional districts.

| District | Edmondson | Stitt | Representative |
|---|---|---|---|
| 1st | 44% | 53% | Kevin Hern |
| 2nd | 37% | 60% | Markwayne Mullin |
| 3rd | 34% | 63% | Frank Lucas |
| 4th | 43% | 54% | Tom Cole |
| 5th | 53% | 44% | Steve Russell (115th Congress) |
| 5th | 53% | 44% | Kendra Horn (116th Congress) |

== See also ==
- 2018 Oklahoma state elections
