= William James Gault =

American politician

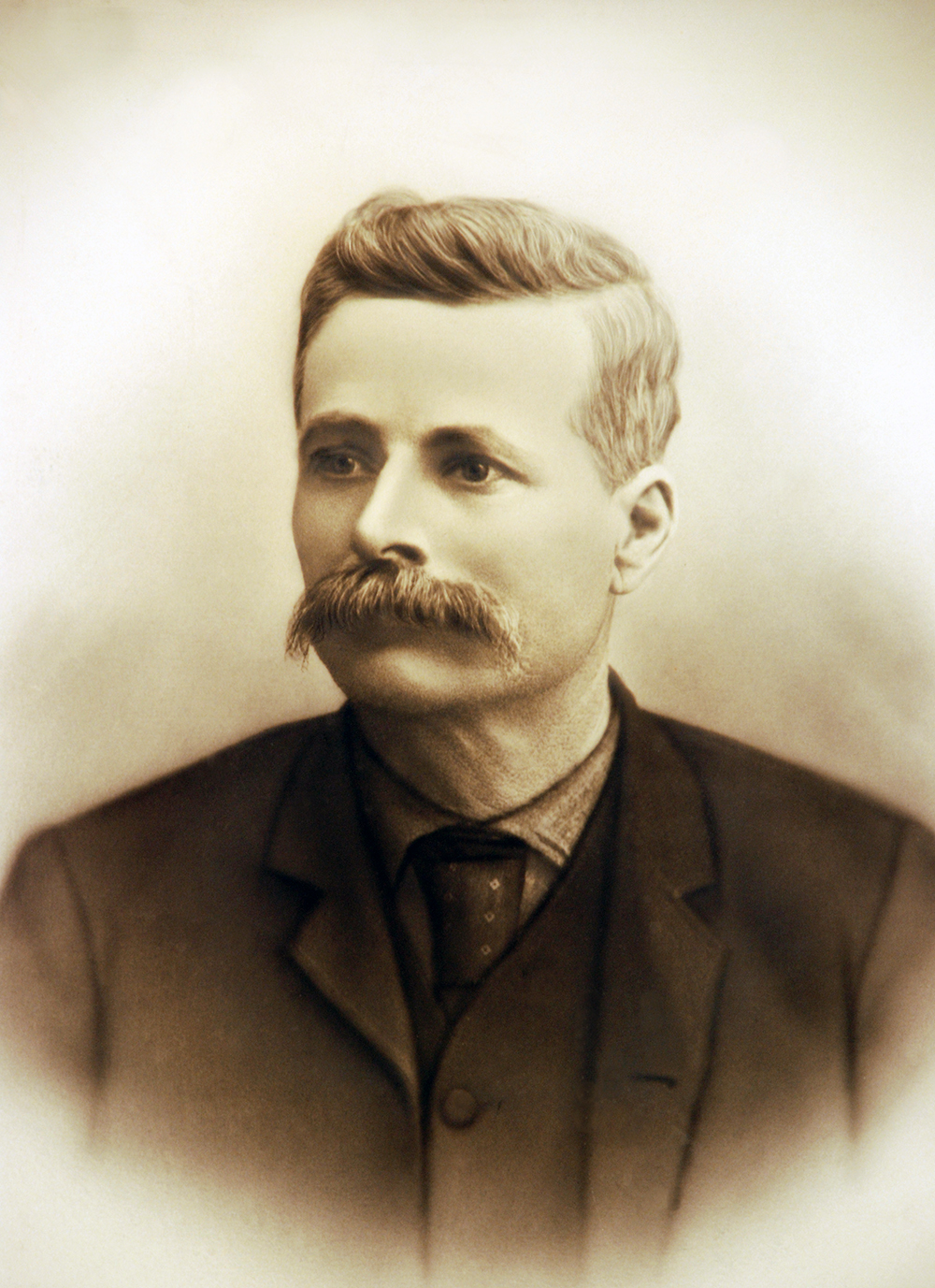
- Gault in 1892

Member of the Oklahoma Territorial House from the 11th district
- In office 1897–1899
- Preceded by: Robert Lowery
- Succeeded by: Charles G. Jones

5th Mayor of Oklahoma City
- In office August 12, 1890 – April 12, 1892
- Preceded by: David Williams Gibbs
- Succeeded by: Oscar A. Mitscher

Personal details
- Born: January , 1830 Ohio
- Died: April 15, 1899 (aged 69)

William James Gault was an American politician who served in the Oklahoma Territorial Legislature, as Mayor of El Dorado, Kansas, in the 1870s, and as Mayor of Oklahoma City from 1890 to 1892.

== Biography ==
William James Gault was born in Washington County, New York, in January 1830. He moved between Illinois, California, and Missouri, before moving to El Dorado, Kansas, in 1876 where he served one term as mayor. He participated in the Land Run of 1889 and formed a lumber company in Oklahoma City. He was elected Mayor of Oklahoma City in 1890 defeating Henry Overholser and served between August 12, 1890, and April 12, 1892. He was elected to the Oklahoma Territorial Legislature's House of Representatives in 1896. He died on April 15, 1899. Gault's son, also named William, lost his 1915 Oklahoma City mayoral campaign to Ed Overholser.
