= David Williams Gibbs =

American politician

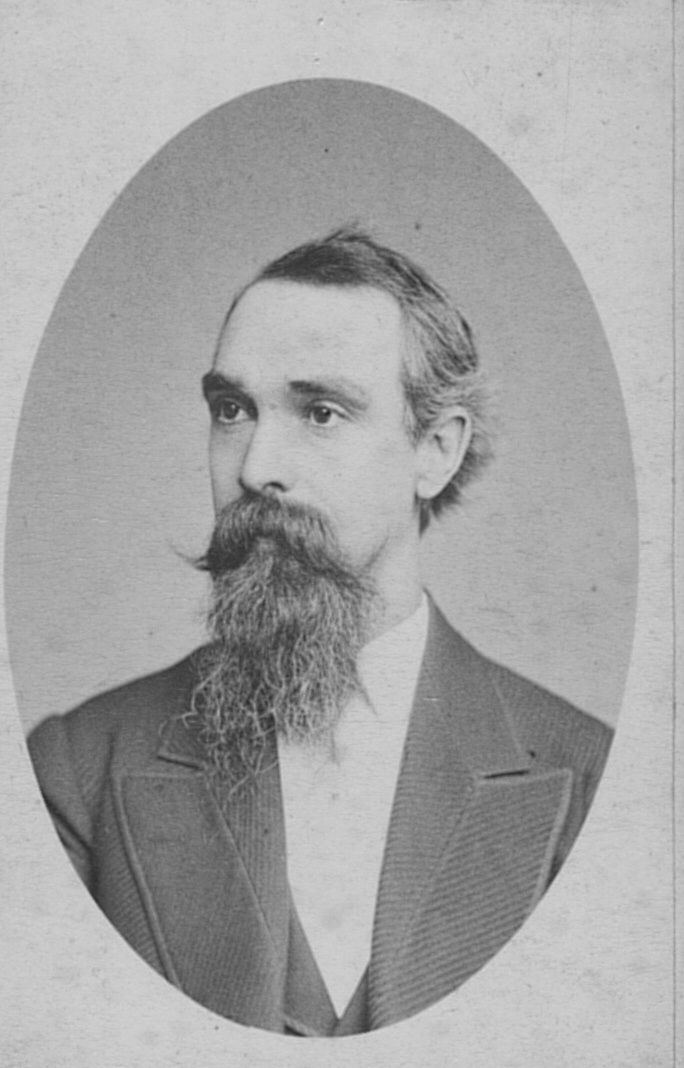

4th Mayor of Oklahoma City
- In office July 15, 1890 – August 9, 1890
- Preceded by: Andrew Jackson Beale
- Succeeded by: William James Gault

Personal details
- Born: February 22, 1837 Ohio
- Died: October 19, 1917 (aged 80)

David Williams Gibbs was an American politician and architect best known for designing the Wyoming State Capitol and serving as the chair of the commission which organized Oklahoma City in Oklahoma Territory.

== Biography ==
David Williams Gibbs was born February 22, 1837, in Ohio. He worked on the design for the Wyoming State Capitol before later moving to Oklahoma City. He served as the de facto Mayor of Oklahoma City while the city was being organized as part of Oklahoma Territory until elections were held from July 15, 1890, to August 9, 1890. The provisional board of trustees also included T. J. Watson, Nelson Button, Sam Frist, and Henry Overholser. He died on October 19, 1917.
