= Charles G. Jones =

American urban developer and politician (1856–1911)

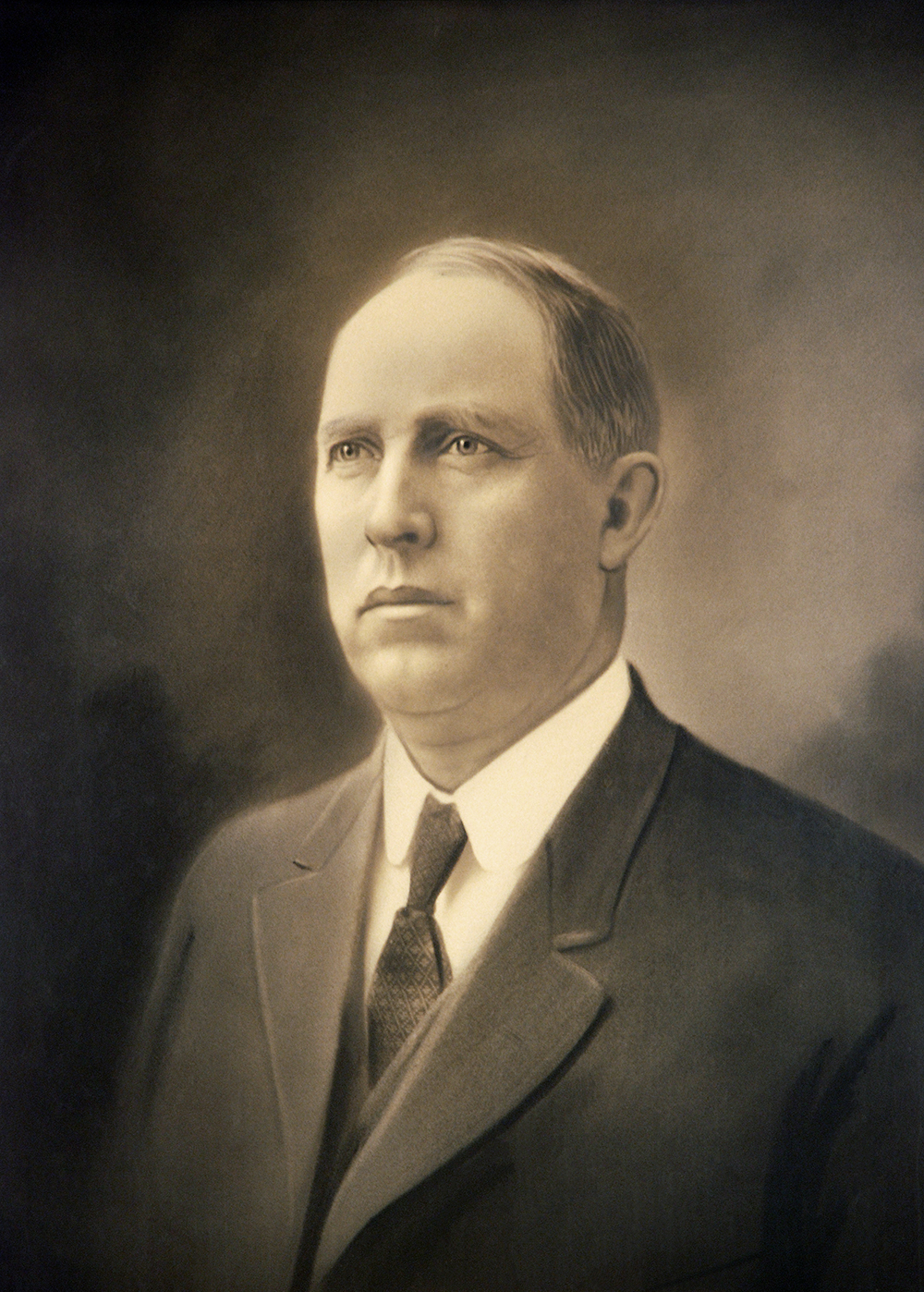

Member of the Oklahoma House of Representatives from the Oklahoma County district
- In office November 16, 1907 – November 16, 1910
- Preceded by: Position established

8th and 11th Mayor of Oklahoma City
- In office April 8, 1901 – April 13, 1903
- Preceded by: Robert E. Lee Van Winkle
- Succeeded by: Robert E. Lee Van Winkle
- In office April 13, 1896 – April 12, 1897
- Preceded by: Nelson Button
- Succeeded by: James P. Allen

Member of the Oklahoma Territorial House from the 11th district
- In office 1899–1903
- Preceded by: William James Gault
- Succeeded by: John H. Decker

Member of the Oklahoma Territorial House from the 2nd district
- In office 1890–1893 Serving with Moses Neal, Samuel D. Pack, D. W. Peery, and Hugh G. Trosper
- Preceded by: Position established
- Succeeded by: J. M. Johnson

Personal details
- Born: November 3, 1856 Greenup, Illinois, U.S.
- Died: March 29, 1911 (aged 54) Jones, Oklahoma, U.S.
- Party: Republican

Charles Gasham "Gristmill" Jones (November 3, 1856 – March 29, 1911) was an American urban developer and politician in the U.S. state of Oklahoma. Jones was responsible for bringing electrical power to downtown Oklahoma City and developing a railroad line between Sapulpa, Oklahoma, and Oklahoma City. The town of Jones, Oklahoma, is named for him.

== Early life ==
Jones was born in Greenup, Illinois, on November 3, 1856, and arrived in Oklahoma Territory in 1889.

== Career ==
=== Urban development ===
After arriving in Oklahoma Territory, Jones organized the construction of a canal to bring electrical power to downtown Oklahoma City and built the first flour mill in Oklahoma Territory. (Note: The flour mill project caused him to be known by the nickname "Gristmill" Jones.) The town of Jones, Oklahoma, was named for Charles G. Jones and was platted by a friend, Luther F. Aldrich, in 1898. Jones owned a farmstead in the town, which is today listed in the National Register of Historic Places.

The post office for the town of Elgin, Oklahoma was originally named "Ceegee, Oklahoma" using Charles G. Jones initials, when it was established in April 1902. However, after Post Office management intervened in August 1902, the name was changed to Elgin.

The statehood movement had begun and Jones served as chair of the Single Statehood Executive Committee that first met in 1903 and lobbied for three years for the successful passage of the Oklahoma Enabling Act, which created the state of Oklahoma.

=== Railroads ===
Jones’s most important contribution to the development and history of Oklahoma City involved the construction of rail lines. With frequent collaborator Henry Overholser, Jones had organized the St. Louis and Oklahoma City Railroad in 1895. By 1898, that line linked Oklahoma City with Sapulpa, Oklahoma and the trackage of a predecessor of the St. Louis–San Francisco Railway (“Frisco”); it was sold to that company the next year.

Jones and Overholser also incorporated the Oklahoma City Terminal Railroad (“Terminal”) on April 7, 1900 under the laws of Oklahoma Territory. Terminal built between April and November of that year about one to one-and-a-half miles of trackage in central Oklahoma City to service the Frisco depot. The single standard-gauge line connected the trackage of the Choctaw, Oklahoma and Gulf Railroad (later the Chicago, Rock Island and Pacific Railroad or “Rock Island”) with that of the Frisco, and was placed in operation on November 1, 1900. The line was then sold to the Frisco on June 21, 1901. However, that part of Oklahoma City’s history was undone when, in response to the growing inconvenience to all parties of having all-important rail lines cluttering up the center of a busy town, Oklahoma City came up with a plan, funded by municipal bonds, to move the surface rail lines and passenger stations of the Rock Island and Frisco out of downtown. The former Terminal trackage was sold to the City of Oklahoma City in late 1928, a new Union Depot was constructed in a different location on behalf of the Frisco and Rock Island, and some or all of the former trackage land became part of the Oklahoma City Civic Center and public parks.

=== Political career ===
A Republican, Jones was elected to the 1st, 5th and 6th Oklahoma Territorial Legislatures, representing Oklahoma County, served two terms as the mayor of Oklahoma City in 1896 and 1897 and 1901 to 1903 and was elected to the 2nd Oklahoma State Legislature.

== Death ==
Charles Jones died of a stomach hemorrhage on March 29, 1911, at his homestead in Jones, Oklahoma.
