= Nelson Button =

American urban developer and politician

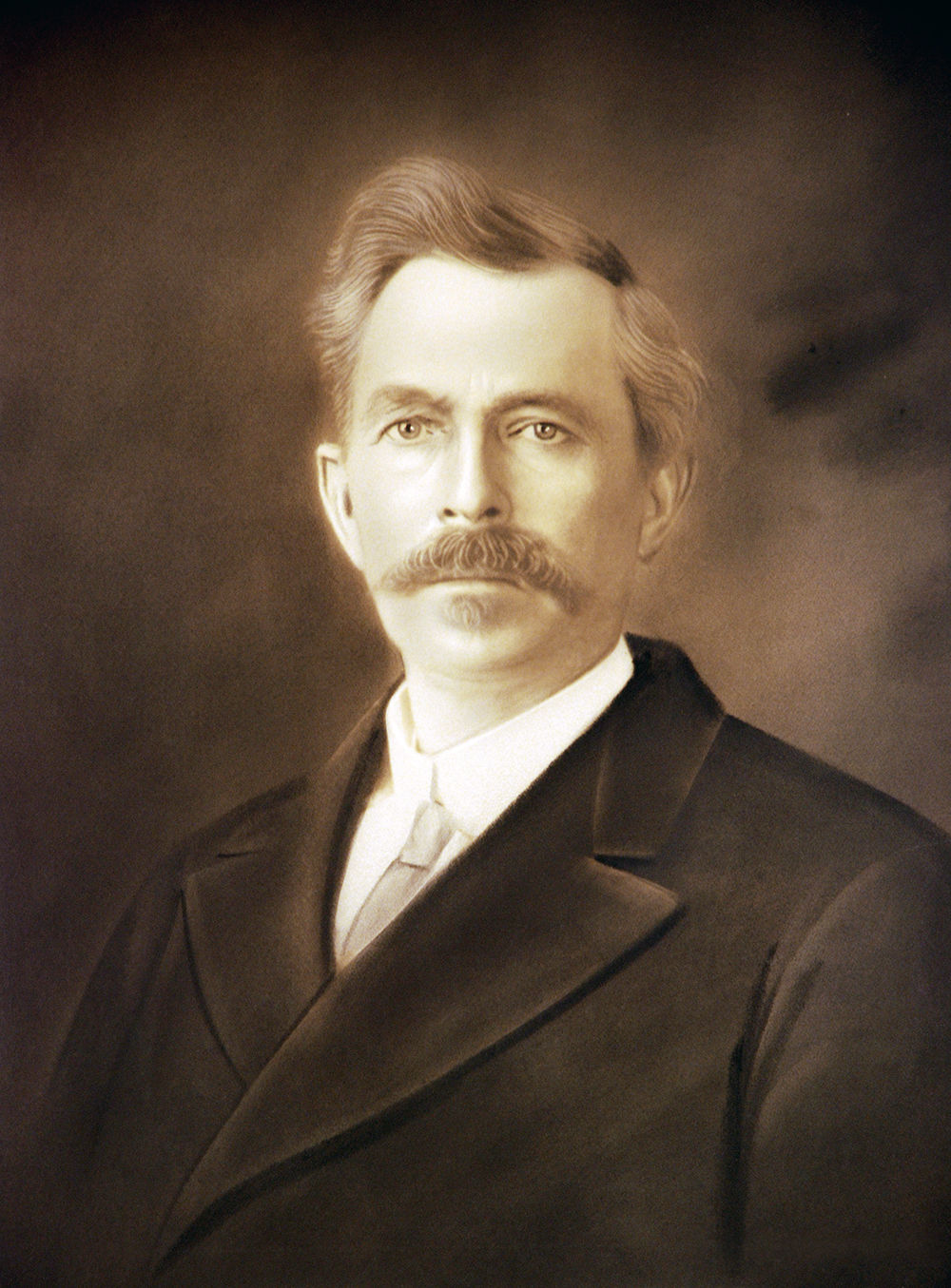
- Button in 1901

7th Mayor of Oklahoma City
- In office April 9, 1894 – April 13, 1896
- Preceded by: Oscar A. Mitscher
- Succeeded by: Charles G. Jones

Oklahoma City Council
- In office 1891–1894

Oklahoma City Board of Trustees
- In office July 15, 1890 – August 9, 1890
- Preceded by: Position established
- Succeeded by: Position disestablished

Personal details
- Born: February 17, 1849 Indiana
- Died: April 27, 1914 (aged 65) Utah

Nelson Button was an American politician who was a member of the original appointed Oklahoma City board of trustees, one of the first elected Oklahoma City Councilors, and as Mayor of Oklahoma City between 1894 and 1896.

== Biography ==
Nelson Button was born on February 17, 1849, in Indiana. He helped plan Meade, Kansas, before participating in the Land Run of 1889 and settling in Oklahoma City. He was appointed to the original board of trustees alongside David Williams Gibbs between July 15, 1890, and August 9, 1890. Afterward he was elected to represent Ward 1 of the Oklahoma City Council and served until elected mayor in 1894. He was mayor between April 9, 1894, and April 13, 1896. He died in Utah on April 27, 1914.
