= Jones, Oklahoma =

- Town
- Location in Oklahoma County and the state of Oklahoma.
- Coordinates: 35°33′52″N 97°17′22″W
- Country: United States
- State: Oklahoma
- County: Oklahoma

Area
  - Total: 13.68 sq mi (35.42 km^{2})
  - Land: 13.67 sq mi (35.40 km^{2})
  - Water: 0.0077 sq mi (0.02 km^{2})
- Elevation: 1,116 ft (340 m)

Population (2020)
  - Total: 2,885
  - Density: 211/sq mi (81.5/km^{2})
- Time zone: UTC-6 (Central (CST))
  - Summer (DST): UTC-5 (CDT)
- ZIP code: 73049
- Area code: 405
- FIPS code: 40-38350
- GNIS feature ID: 2412809
- Website: Town of Jones

Jones is a town in Oklahoma County, Oklahoma. It is named after Charles G. Jones, a three-time mayor of Oklahoma City. As of the 2020 census, Jones had a population of 2,885.

== History ==
=== Early history ===
Jones was plotted as a townsite on April 22, 1898 by Luther F. Aldrich before the St. Louis and Oklahoma City Railroad constructed a line from Sapulpa to Oklahoma City. Aldrich named the town after his friend and business associate, Charles G. "Gristmill" Jones who was a three-time mayor of Oklahoma City. Jones later named his eldest son Luther.

Jones is located just south of the place that Washington Irving described as "The Ringing of Horses" in the book A Tour on the Prairies (1835).

Jones was incorporated as a city on January 4, 1909. The 1910 Census counted the population at 163.

=== 2007 ice storm and Jones High School fire ===
In December 2007, a devastating ice storm hit much of Oklahoma. It resulted in a fire at Jones High School, causing the school to burn to the ground. The new school was finished in 2010, after taking three years to build. The new school has a commons area and a theatre for drama club.

=== Earthquakes ===
On August 27, 2009, there were six earthquakes, the strongest of which registering a 3.7 magnitude on the Richter Scale, which occurred at 9:09 pm Central Standard Time.

On January 15, 2010, there were four earthquakes, the strongest of which registering a 4.0 magnitude on the Richter Scale, which occurred at 9:25 am Central Standard Time.

On January 24, 2010, a magnitude 3.7 earthquake struck Jones at 1:15 am Central Standard Time.

On February 27, 2010, a magnitude 4.1 earthquake struck, east of Oklahoma City at 4:22 pm Central Standard Time, preceded by a foreshock of magnitude 3.1 farther west on February 26 at 3:02 am local time.

On October 13, 2010, a 4.7 magnitude earthquake hit, 10 miles (16 km) east of Norman at 9:06 a.m.

== Geography ==
According to the United States Census Bureau, the town has a total area of 13.7 square miles (35 km^{2}), all land.

Jones is located in the Cross Timbers ecoregion and the Frontier Country tourism region.

== Demographics ==
Historical population
Census	Pop.	Note	%±
1910	163		—
1920	214		31.3%
1930	288		34.6%
1940	260		−9.7%
1950	476		83.1%
1960	794		66.8%
1970	1,666		109.8%
1980	2,270		36.3%
1990	2,424		6.8%
2000	2,517		3.8%
2010	2,692		7.0%
2020	2,885		7.2%
U.S. Decennial Census

=== 2020 census ===
As of the 2020 census, Jones had a population of 2,885. The median age was 39.9 years. 25.2% of residents were under the age of 18 and 16.7% of residents were 65 years of age or older. For every 100 females there were 93.2 males, and for every 100 females age 18 and over there were 92.7 males age 18 and over.

0.0% of residents lived in urban areas, while 100.0% lived in rural areas.

There were 1,082 households in Jones, of which 37.6% had children under the age of 18 living in them. Of all households, 54.4% were married-couple households, 16.1% were households with a male householder and no spouse or partner present, and 24.3% were households with a female householder and no spouse or partner present. About 22.0% of all households were made up of individuals and 9.1% had someone living alone who was 65 years of age or older.

There were 1,189 housing units, of which 9.0% were vacant. The homeowner vacancy rate was 2.3% and the rental vacancy rate was 12.0%.

Racial composition as of the 2020 census
Race	Number	Percent
White	2,190	75.9%
Black or African American	107	3.7%
American Indian and Alaska Native	117	4.1%
Asian	15	0.5%
Native Hawaiian and Other Pacific Islander	3	0.1%
Some other race	46	1.6%
Two or more races	407	14.1%
Hispanic or Latino (of any race)	171	5.9%

=== 2000 census ===
As of the 2000 census, there were 2,517 people, 914 households, and 673 families residing in the town. The population density was 184.2 inhabitants per square mile (71.1/km^{2}). There were 986 housing units at an average density of 72.2 per square mile (27.9/km^{2}). The racial makeup of the town was 88.16% White, 4.41% African American, 3.34% Native American, 0.16% Asian, 0.60% from other races, and 3.34% from two or more races. Hispanic or Latino of any race were 2.94% of the population.

There were 914 households, out of which 34.7% had children under the age of 18 living with them, 57.9% were married couples living together, 11.5% had a female householder with no husband present, and 26.3% were non-families. 22.4% of all households were made up of individuals, and 9.0% had someone living alone who was 65 years of age or older. The average household size was 2.61 and the average family size was 3.04.

In the town, the population was spread out, with 25.0% under the age of 18, 9.3% from 18 to 24, 27.5% from 25 to 44, 24.5% from 45 to 64, and 13.7% who were 65 years of age or older. The median age was 38 years. For every 100 females, there were 97.9 males. For every 100 females age 18 and over, there were 96.8 males.

The median income for a household in the town was $36,806, and the median income for a family was $41,495. Males had a median income of $31,406 versus $23,393 for females. The per capita income for the town was $16,388. About 9.5% of families and 13.6% of the population were below the poverty line, including 16.6% of those under age 18 and 13.4% of those age 65 or over.
