= N. Q. Adams =

American politician

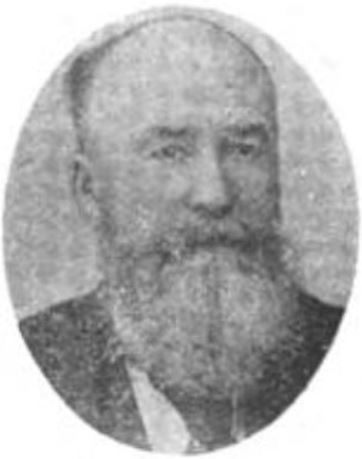
- 1908

Member of the Mississippi State Senate from the 23rd district
- In office January 1896 – January 1900
- Preceded by: R. T. Love
- Succeeded by: James L. Seawright

Member of the Mississippi House of Representatives from the Oktibbeha County district
- In office January 1908 – January 1912

Personal details
- Born: January 22, 1839 Rutherford County, North Carolina, U.S.
- Died: May 1922 (aged 83)
- Party: Democratic
- Children: 15

Military service
- Allegiance: Confederate States of America
- Branch/service: Confederate States Army
- Years of service: 1863-1865
- Rank: Lieutenant
- Unit: 27th Mississippi Infantry, Co. A
- Battles/wars: American Civil War: Atlanta campaign (WIA)

Non Quincy Adams (January 22, 1839 - May 1922) was an American pastor, Confederate soldier and Democratic politician. He was a member of the Mississippi State Senate from 1896 to 1900, and of the Mississippi House of Representatives from 1908 to 1912.

== Early life and career ==
Non Quincy Adams was born on January 22, 1839, in Rutherford County, North Carolina. He was the son of Azariah Adams and his wife, Mary Runyons. He moved to Mississippi with his parents in his infancy. Adams attended the rural schools of Choctaw and Oktibbeha Counties. In 1863, Adams entered Company A of the Twenty-Seventh Mississippi Infantry Regiment with the rank of Lieutenant. Adams lost his left arm in the Atlanta campaign on July 28, 1864. In 1870, Adams became a pastor in the Missionary Baptist Church. He was the moderator at ten different gatherings of his religious association.

== Political career ==
In 1895, Adams (a resident of Sturgis, Mississippi) was elected to represent the 23rd District (Oktibbeha and Choctaw counties) in the Mississippi State Senate; he served from 1896 to 1900. During his Senate term, Adams also led the opening prayers during some Senate sessions. Adams also served on the following committees: Unfinished Business; Humane & Benevolent Institutions; Temperance; and Enrolled Bills. On November 5, 1907, Adams was elected to represent Oktibbeha County as a Democrat in the Mississippi House of Representatives, and served from 1908 to 1912. Adams died in May 1922.

== Personal life ==
Adams was a member of the Freemasons. He married three times: first Catharine Griffith in 1857, second Lois Avaline Hannah in 1870, and third Mary Delilah Atkins. He had a total of fifteen children, of whom twelve were living in 1908.
