= Mick Cornett =

American politician (born 1958)

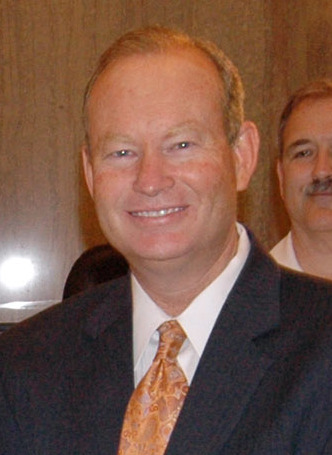
- Cornett in 2007

37th Mayor of Oklahoma City
- In office March 2, 2004 – April 10, 2018
- Preceded by: Guy Liebmann
- Succeeded by: David Holt

74th President of the United States Conference of Mayors
- In office July 22, 2016 – January 20, 2017
- Preceded by: Stephanie Rawlings-Blake
- Succeeded by: Mitch Landrieu

Member of the Oklahoma City Council from Ward 1
- In office October 20, 2001 – November 3, 2004
- Preceded by: Frosty Peak
- Succeeded by: Gary Marrs

Personal details
- Born: Michael Earl Cornett; July 16, 1958 (age 67) Oklahoma City, Oklahoma, U.S.
- Party: Republican
- Spouse(s): Lisa (divorced) Terri Walker (m. 2014)
- Children: 3
- Education: University of Oklahoma (BA); New York University (MBA)

Michael Earl Cornett Sr. (born July 16, 1958) is an American politician and former television personality who served as the 35th mayor of Oklahoma City, from 2005 until 2018. A member of the Republican Party, he was only the fourth mayor in Oklahoma City history to be elected to three terms and the first to be elected to four terms.

He also served as President of the United States Conference of Mayors and as national President of the Republican Mayors and Local Officials (RMLO). He also served as Chairman of the U.S. Conference of Mayors Urban Economic Affairs Committee until 2007.

In 2018, he was defeated in the Republican runoff by Tulsa businessman Kevin Stitt for the GOP nomination for Governor of Oklahoma. In 2006, Cornett was defeated by Mary Fallin for the Republican runoff for U.S. Congress.

== Early life ==
Cornett is a native of Oklahoma City. His mother was a teacher and his father was a postal worker. He attended Putnam City High School, graduating in 1976. He then attended the University of Oklahoma, earning a journalism degree in television news. He earned a Master of Business Administration from New York University.

== Journalism career ==
After graduating, Cornett worked at KOCO-TV channel 5 (ABC affiliate) for twenty years in news and sports as a sports reporter and sports director, weekend sports anchor, morning/noon news anchor in Oklahoma City. As a reporter, he covered city politics from 1997 to 1999. In 1999 he started his own video production company, Mick Cornett Video Productions, specializing in jobs for the corporate and legal sectors. Cornett is the co-host of The Verdict, a local Oklahoma City television show discussing legal and social issues.

== City council ==
Cornett was elected to the Oklahoma City Council in 2001. He defeated the incumbent City Councilman, Frosty Peak.

== Mayoralty ==
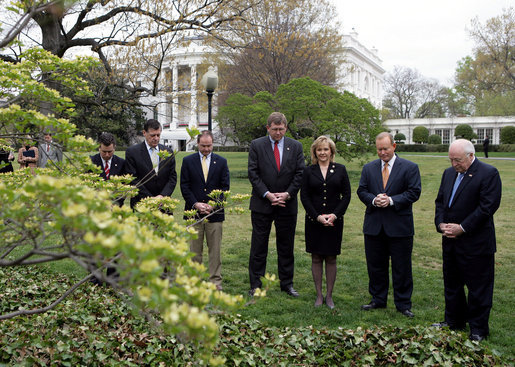
Cornett with Vice President Dick Cheney in 2007

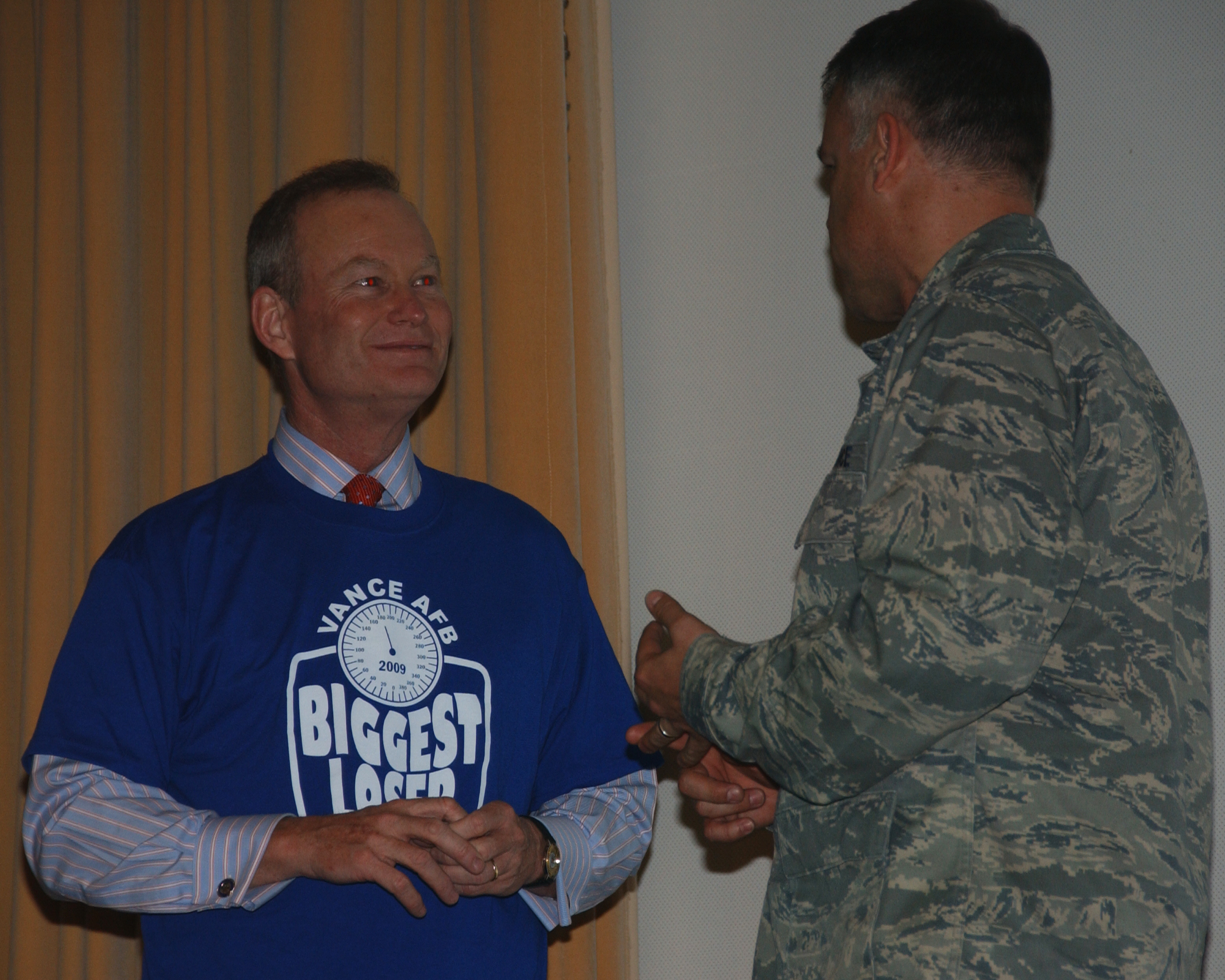
Cornett in 2009

Cornett became the Mayor of Oklahoma City on March 2, 2004. He was re-elected to a second term on March 7, 2006, by an 87.6% margin, the largest in city history. In 2010, he became only the fourth mayor in Oklahoma City history to be elected to a third term, defeating Steve Hunt by gaining 58% of the vote. In 2014, he became the first mayor to be elected to a fourth term, defeating Ed Shadid with 65.7% of the vote.

Cornett served as an Executive Vice President of Ackerman McQueen from 2009 to 2011, during which the Oklahoma Ad Club named him 2010's "Ad Man of the Year." Cornett came in for some criticism for potential conflict of interest as a mayor serving as an employee of a private corporation.

Cornett received an MBA, specializing in management, entrepreneurship and leadership, from NYU Stern School of Business in July 2011.

Cornett's most notable achievements as mayor include the successful lobbying that resulted in Oklahoma City's first major league sports team, the Oklahoma City Thunder of the National Basketball Association, and the passage of MAPS 3, a $777 million quality-of-life infrastructure program for Oklahoma City.

In 2013, Cornett served as one of six selection committee members for the Rudy Bruner Award for Urban Excellence.

One month prior Cornett stepping down as mayor, the City of Oklahoma City received its 8th-straight AAA bond rating from both Standard & Poor's and Moody's Investor Service. Cornett was quoted saying "Our top-notch bond ratings are a reflection of Oklahoma City's sound financial management, and it's good news for Oklahoma City's residents and taxpayers. We understand we have a responsibility to our taxpayers to pursue budgetary practices that allow us to meet or exceed service expectations, and keep our bond ratings high and borrowing costs low."

=== Economic growth ===
Cornett has been a proponent for urban issues and initiatives such as rapid and mass transit, economic diversification, urban renaissance and civic beautification. Neighborhoods such as Asia District, Uptown, MidTown, Capitol Hill, the Eastside, and others have experienced an economic revitalization during his tenure. Downtown Oklahoma City has experienced a continued renaissance since 1993, earning Oklahoma City the moniker "Renaissance City".

In June 2007, the U.S. Census announced its estimate that Oklahoma City had grown in city population to over 547,000 residents; over 1.26 percent between July 2005 and July 2006. Since the official Census in 2000, Oklahoma City had grown over eight percent according to the Census Bureau, making it the 12th fastest-growing large city (over 500,000 in population) in the United States.

Other recent initiatives have also included his chairmanship of the "Core to Shore" committee of city leaders, and continued job growth in greater Oklahoma City. Led by almost 2,000 jobs that Dell brought to Oklahoma City, the greater Oklahoma City area gained over 72,000 new jobs in Cornett's first five years in office. During the Great Recession, compared to other metropolitan areas in the United States, Oklahoma City had one of the lowest unemployment rates, suffered one of the least severe economic downturns, and experienced one of the largest recoveries afterward.

=== MAPS 3 ===
In December 2009, Cornett led the way to successful voter passage of the MAPS 3 initiative, which includes eight quality-of-life capital projects to be constructed in Oklahoma City over a decade.

=== MAPS for Kids ===
One of Cornett's top priorities was the implementation of MAPS for Kids. That initiative is responsible for rebuilding or renovating every building in the inner-city school district.

=== NBA teams ===
Cornett is widely credited with bringing the National Basketball Association to Oklahoma City when Hurricane Katrina forced the New Orleans Hornets to relocate in 2005. Cornett's behind-the-scenes work prior to Katrina put Oklahoma City in position to become the temporary home. For two seasons, the team played 35 games annually at the Ford Center.

On December 20, 2007, Cornett announced an initiative to renovate Ford Center in hopes of securing an NBA team. The initiative went to the voters of Oklahoma City on March 4, 2008 and passed by a 62% margin. On July 2, 2008, it became official that the NBA's SuperSonics franchise, headed by local businessman Clay Bennett, were relocating to Oklahoma City for the 2008–2009 season.

=== "This City Is Going On A Diet" ===
Inspired by his own 42-pound weight loss, on December 31, 2007, Cornett put Oklahoma City on a "diet", launching the web site thiscityisgoingonadiet.com. He appeared on The Ellen DeGeneres Show to promote the initiative on January 17, 2008. He also teamed up with Taco Bell and local restaurants to promote healthy menu choices. This initiative garnered Cornett an invitation to sit with First Lady Michelle Obama at the 2010 State of the Union address.

== Awards and distinctions ==
In 2009, he was named one of the top 10 most powerful Oklahomans by the Oklahoma City Friday newspaper, ranking ahead of the state's two U.S. Senators.

In November 2010, Governing Magazine named Cornett one of their "2010 Public Officials of the Year" and put him on the cover.

Also in 2010, he was named runner-up of the World Mayor prize, and also the recipient of the World Mayor Project's 2010 World Mayor Commendation, in recognition of the economic and civic progress of Oklahoma City.

In 2012, Newsweek named Cornett one of the five most innovative mayors in the United States.

Cornett was the recipient of the 2013 Oklahoma Mayor of the Year Award, presented by the Mayors Council of Oklahoma of the Oklahoma Municipal League.

The American Architectural Foundation awarded Cornett the Joseph P Riley Award, for his contributions to Oklahoma City Metropolitan Area Projects, at a gala in Washington, D.C., on March 22, 2013.

Fortune Magazine released their 2018 list of the "World's 50 Greatest Leaders" list on April 19, 2018. Cornett was ranked as the 25th greatest leader in the world, where Fortune gave credit to his fiscal conservative background for the creativity in leading Oklahoma City's advancements in school revitalization, public transit and downtown improvements.

== Other political activities ==
On May 11, 2006, Cornett announced that he would be running to fill the seat in the United States House of Representatives vacated by Ernest Istook. On August 22, 2006, he was defeated by Lieutenant Governor Mary Fallin in a GOP run-off election, as Fallin was elected to Congress in the general election.

Following Fallin's decision to run for governor in 2010, Cornett was widely considered a possible candidate for the seat, but he decided to run for re-election as mayor.

In 2008, Cornett was scheduled to address the Republican National Convention in St. Paul, Minnesota, but his speech was canceled when reaction to Hurricane Gustav suspended the convention. He returned and addressed the 2012 Republican National Convention.

In 2010, Cornett's Chief of Staff, David Holt, was elected to the Oklahoma Senate. In 2012, Holt authored the book Big League City: Oklahoma City's Rise to the NBA, which chronicled Cornett's efforts to bring the NBA to Oklahoma City.

In 2017, Cornett was appointed to sit on the US DOT's Automation Committee for overseeing self-driving transportation policy.

On February 22, 2017, Cornett announced that he would not seek reelection for a fifth term as Oklahoma City mayor.

On May 31, 2017, Cornett announced his 2018 candidacy for governor of Oklahoma via Twitter. On June 26, Cornett placed first in the Republican primary but did not receive more than 50% of the vote. He advanced to the runoff election on August 28, 2018 which he placed second to Tulsa businessman Kevin Stitt who in the November general election was elected as governor.

== In business ==
Cornett became a filmmaker with the release of "Oklahoma City: The Boom, the Bust and the Bomb" in 2016. The film was produced, written and directed by Cornett who describes the documentary as "...a tale of resilience, exploring how Oklahoma City's turbulent past helped shape its bright, flourishing future." The film takes a look at Oklahoma's history, specifically its economic ups-and-downs with commodities. The focus narrows in on the 25-year period of Oklahoma City history from 1970 to 1995, which saw the rise of the oil boom in the 1970s, the banking and financial crash of the 1980s and also the physical and emotional effects resulted in the bombing of the Oklahoma City Murrah Federal Building in 1995.

On September 25, 2018, Penguin Random House will release the first book authored by Cornett, titled The Next American City. The book is described as "An invigorating look at how American cities are reinventing themselves and redirecting the future of the nation by way of civic engagement, inventive public policy, and smart urban design, The Next American City is a look at the changes re-shaping American urban life–and a blueprint for those to come." The book borrows the title of a magazine known as The Next American City, later shortened to Next City which promotes socially, economically and environmentally sustainable practices in urban areas across the country and examines how and why cities are changing. It covers topics such as planning, transportation, urban economies, housing and environmental issues. In 2011, Next City ceased publication of its quarterly print magazine, relaunching in 2012 as a fully digital operation.

== Personal life ==
In 2011, Cornett filed for divorce from his wife of 32 years, Lisa, citing "total irreconcilable incompatibility." The couple has three grown sons: Mike, Casey and Tristan. Cornett married his second wife, Terri (Walker) Cornett, on November 26, 2014.

Cornett also drew attention in 2020 for one of his hobbies. His collection of Green Bay Packers football cards became ranked number one in the world according to Professional Sports Authenticators (PSA) of Newport Beach, California.

== Electoral history ==
2018 Oklahoma gubernatorial election

2018 Republican gubernatorial primary
Party	Candidate	Votes	%
Republican	Mick Cornett	132,806	29.3
Republican	Kevin Stitt	110,479	24.4
Republican	Todd Lamb	107,985	23.9
Republican	Dan Fisher	35,818	7.9
Republican	Gary Jones	25,243	5.6
Republican	Gary Richardson	18,185	4.0
Republican	Blake Stephens	12,211	2.7
Republican	Christopher Barnett	5,240	1.2
Republican	Barry Gowdy	2,347	0.5
Republican	Eric Foutch	2,347	0.5
Total votes		452,606	100.0

August 28, 2018 Republican gubernatorial primary runoff
Party	Candidate	Votes	%
Republican	Kevin Stitt	164,892	54.56
Republican	Mick Cornett	137,316	45.44
Total votes		302,208	100.0

== See also ==
- List of mayors of the 50 largest cities in the United States

Civic offices
Preceded by Frosty Peak	Member of the Oklahoma City Council from Ward 1; 2001–2004	Succeeded by Gary Marrs
Political offices
Preceded by Guy Liebmann	Mayor of Oklahoma City; 2004–2018	Succeeded by David Holt
Preceded by Stephanie Rawlings-Blake	President of the United States Conference of Mayors; 2016–2017	Succeeded by Mitch Landrieu
