= List of mayors of Oklahoma City =

The following persons have held the office of mayor of Oklahoma City. Mayors of Oklahoma City are elected to four year terms.

== List of mayors ==
No. (Note: Oklahoma City counts David Holt as its 38th mayor.)	Mayor	Took office	Left office	Tenure	Election	Party
Provisional mayors following land run
1	William Couch (1850–1890)	April 27, 1889	November 11, 1889	198 days	–	Unknown
2	Sidney Clarke (1831–1909); Acting	November 11, 1889	November 27, 1889	16 days	–	Republican
3	Andrew Jackson Beale (1831–1909)	November 27, 1889	December 30, 1889	33 days	–	Unknown
Unknown		December 30, 1889	July 15, 1890			
4	David Williams Gibbs (1837–1917); Acting	July 15, 1890	August 9, 1890	25 days	–	Unknown
Elected mayors following Oklahoma City's incorporation
5	William James Gault (1830–1899)	August 12, 1890	April 12, 1892	1 year, 244 days	1890	Unknown
6	Oscar A. Mitscher (1861–1926)	April 12, 1892	April 9, 1894	1 year, 362 days	1892	Republican
7	Nelson Button (1849–1914)	April 9, 1894	April 13, 1896	2 years, 4 days	1894	Unknown
8	Charles G. Jones (1856–1911); 1st time	April 13, 1896	April 12, 1897	364 days	1896	Republican
9	James P. Allen (1848–1922)	April 12, 1897	April 10, 1899	1 year, 363 days	1897	Democratic
10	Robert E. Lee Van Winkle (1862–1928); 1st time	April 10, 1899	April 8, 1901	1 year, 363 days	1899	Unknown
11	Charles G. Jones (1856–1911); 2nd time	April 8, 1901	April 13, 1903	2 years, 5 days	1901	Republican
12	Robert E. Lee Van Winkle (1862–1928); 2nd time	April 13, 1903	April 10, 1905	1 year, 363 days	1903	Unknown
13	Joseph Fife Messenbaugh (1873–1928)	April 10, 1905	April 8, 1907	1 year, 363 days	1905	Unknown
14	Henry Scales (1869–1918)	April 8, 1907	October 18, 1910 (Note: Scales resigned for "matters of personal business".)	3 years, 193 days	1907	Unknown
14	Henry Scales (1869–1918)	April 8, 1907	October 18, 1910	3 years, 193 days	1909	Unknown
15	Dan V. Lackey (1877–1959); Acting	October 18, 1910	June 8, 1911	233 days	–	Unknown
16	Whit M. Grant (1851–1927)	June 8, 1911	April 13, 1915	3 years, 309 days	1911	Democratic
17	Ed Overholser (1869–1931)	April 13, 1915	December 24, 1918 (Note: Overholser resigned for health reasons.)	3 years, 255 days	1915	Republican
18	Byron D. Shear (1869–1929); Acting	December 24, 1918	April 7, 1919	104 days	–	Republican
19	Jack C. Walton (1881–1949)	April 7, 1919	January 9, 1923 (Note: Walton resigned to become Governor of Oklahoma.)	3 years, 277 days	1919	Democratic
20	Mike Donnelly (1880–1972); Acting	January 9, 1923	April 4, 1923	85 days	–	Unknown
21	O. A. Cargill (1885–1973)	April 4, 1923	April 12, 1927	4 years, 8 days	1923	Democratic
22	Walter Crowder Dean (1865–1952)	April 12, 1927	April 12, 1931	4 years, 0 days	1927	Unknown
23	Clarence Blinn (1886–1976)	April 12, 1931	November 7, 1933 (Note: Blinn was ousted from office by a successful recall petition.)	2 years, 209 days	1931	Unknown
24	Thomas McGee (1887–1963)	November 7, 1933	April 9, 1935	1 year, 153 days	–	Unknown
25	John Frank Martin (1892–1968)	April 9, 1935	April 11, 1939	4 years, 2 days	1935	Unknown
26	Robert A. Hefner (1874–1971)	April 11, 1939	April 8, 1947	7 years, 362 days	1939	Unknown
26	Robert A. Hefner (1874–1971)	April 11, 1939	April 8, 1947	7 years, 362 days	1943	Unknown
27	Allen Street (1885–1969)	April 8, 1947	April 7, 1959	11 years, 364 days	1947	Democratic
27	Allen Street (1885–1969)	April 8, 1947	April 7, 1959	11 years, 364 days	1951	Democratic
27	Allen Street (1885–1969)	April 8, 1947	April 7, 1959	11 years, 364 days	1955	Democratic
28	James Norick (1920–2015); 1st time	April 7, 1959	April 9, 1963	4 years, 2 days	1959	Democratic
29	Jack Stauffer Wilkes (1917–1969)	April 9, 1963	May 31, 1964 (Note: Wilkes resigned to become President of Centenary College of Louisiana.)	1 year, 52 days	1963	Democratic
Unknown		May 31, 1964	June 16, 1964			
30	George H. Shirk (1913–1977); Acting, then elected	June 16, 1964	April 11, 1967	2 years, 299 days	App.	Unknown
30	George H. Shirk (1913–1977); Acting, then elected	June 16, 1964	April 11, 1967	2 years, 299 days	1965 special	Unknown
31	James Norick (1920–2015); 2nd time	April 11, 1967	April 13, 1971	4 years, 2 days	1967	Democratic
32	Patience Latting (1918–2012)	April 13, 1971	April 12, 1983	11 years, 364 days	1971	Democratic
32	Patience Latting (1918–2012)	April 13, 1971	April 12, 1983	11 years, 364 days	1975	Democratic
32	Patience Latting (1918–2012)	April 13, 1971	April 12, 1983	11 years, 364 days	1979	Democratic
33	Andy Coats (born 1935)	April 12, 1983	April 14, 1987	4 years, 2 days	1983	Democratic
34	Ron Norick (born 1941)	April 14, 1987	April 14, 1998	11 years, 0 days	1987	Republican
34	Ron Norick (born 1941)	April 14, 1987	April 14, 1998	11 years, 0 days	1991	Republican
34	Ron Norick (born 1941)	April 14, 1987	April 14, 1998	11 years, 0 days	1995	Republican
35	Kirk Humphreys (born 1950)	April 14, 1998	November 3, 2003 (Note: Humphreys resigned to run unsuccessfully for United States Senate.)	5 years, 203 days	1998	Republican
35	Kirk Humphreys (born 1950)	April 14, 1998	November 3, 2003	5 years, 203 days	2002	Republican
36	Guy Liebmann (1936–2026); Acting	November 3, 2003	March 2, 2004	120 days	–	Republican
37	Mick Cornett (born 1958)	March 2, 2004	April 10, 2018	14 years, 39 days	2004	Republican
37	Mick Cornett (born 1958)	March 2, 2004	April 10, 2018	14 years, 39 days	2006	Republican
37	Mick Cornett (born 1958)	March 2, 2004	April 10, 2018	14 years, 39 days	2010	Republican
37	Mick Cornett (born 1958)	March 2, 2004	April 10, 2018	14 years, 39 days	2014	Republican
38	David Holt (born 1979)	April 10, 2018	Incumbent	8 years, 94 days	2018	Republican
38	David Holt (born 1979)	April 10, 2018	Incumbent	8 years, 94 days	2022	Republican
38	David Holt (born 1979)	April 10, 2018	Incumbent	8 years, 94 days	2026	Republican

== Timeline ==
The following is a graphical lifespan timeline of mayors of Oklahoma City, listed in the order of first assuming office.
