= Next City =

Urban affairs news non-profit

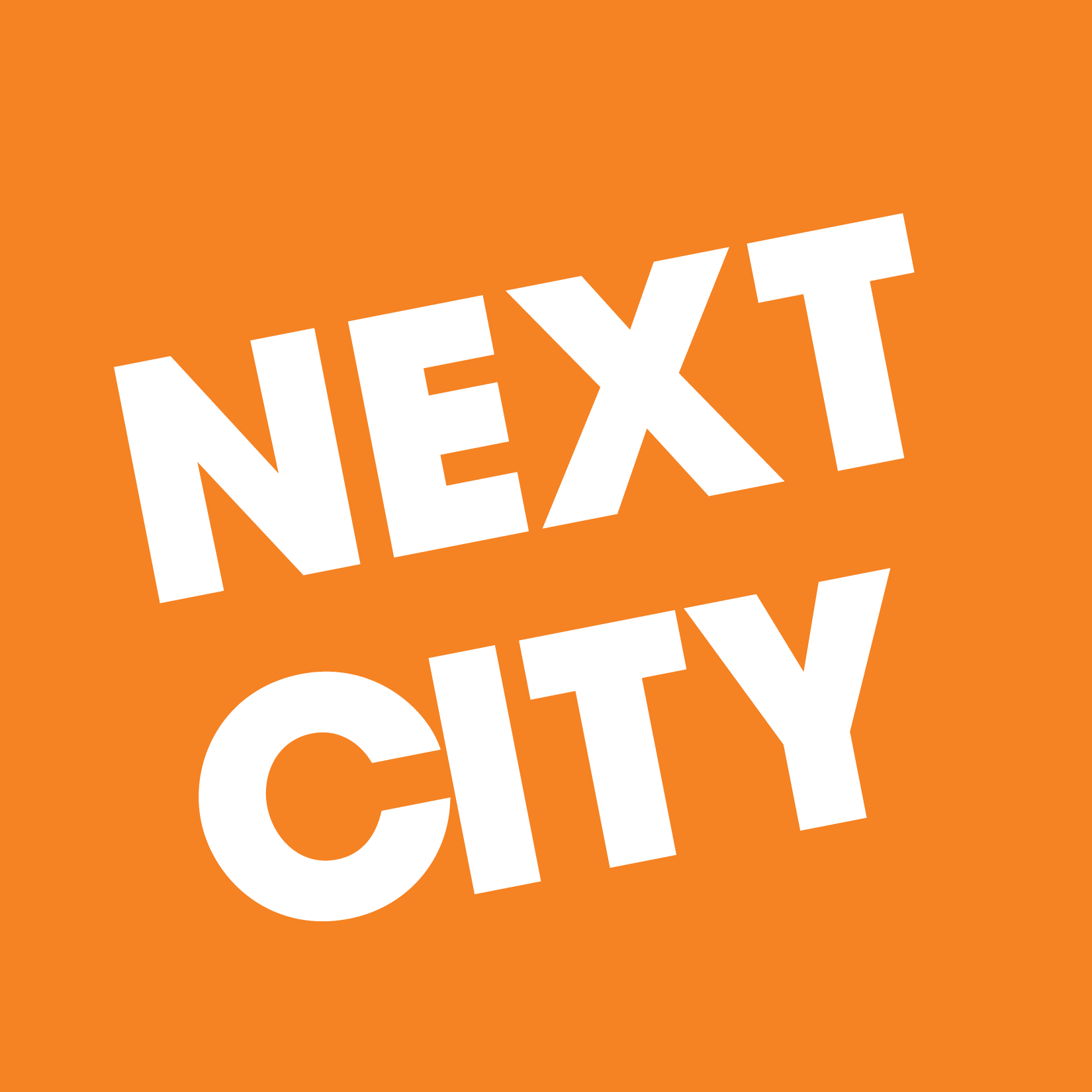
- Next City logo
- Categories: Urban planning, urban economics
- Founded: 2003
- Company: Next City, Inc.
- Country: United States
- Based in: Philadelphia
- Language: English
- Website: Next City
- ISSN: 1544-6999

Next City is a national urban affairs magazine and non-profit organization based in Philadelphia.

First published in March 2003 as a magazine known as The Next American City, Next City promotes socially, economically and environmentally sustainable practices in urban areas across the country and examines how and why cities are changing. It covers topics such as planning, transportation, urban economies, housing and environmental issues.

== History ==
The magazine, originally named The Next American City, was founded in late 2002 by former college classmates Seth Brown, Adam Gordon, and Anika Singh Lemar. The first issue was distributed in spring of 2003, receiving favorable coverage in The New York Times, and The Baltimore Sun, among others. First based in New Haven, Connecticut, and later moving to its current hometown of Philadelphia, NAC operated as a quarterly print product for eight years. Its title was shortened to Next American City in 2008.

Beginning in 2008, editor and publisher Diana Lind expanded Next City's events series to incorporate an annual leadership summit called "Vanguard" and its new media conference "Open Cities: New Media's Role in Shaping Urban Policy." The magazine's exposure widened beyond urban policy circles, with coverage in Monocle, PAPER magazine and elsewhere.

The final print issue of Next American City ran in the summer of 2011. In April 2012, the publication was renamed Next City and moved primarily online, with occasional pieces issued in print, such as their annual "Solutions of the Year" special issue magazine.

In 2015, Ariella Cohen became Editor-in-Chief. In January 2023, Deonna Anderson became Next City's first Black Editorial Director. Next City celebrated its 20th anniversary in 2023.

== Awards ==
- Winner, Best Association / Nonprofit Website, Folio: Eddie Award, 2009
- Nominee, Best Social/Cultural Coverage, Utne Reader, 2009
- Winner, Best Redesign, Folio: Ozzie Award, 2008
- Nominee, Best Social/Cultural Coverage, Utne Reader, 2007

== See also ==
- Institute for Nonprofit News (member)
