= David Holt (politician) =

American politician (born 1979)

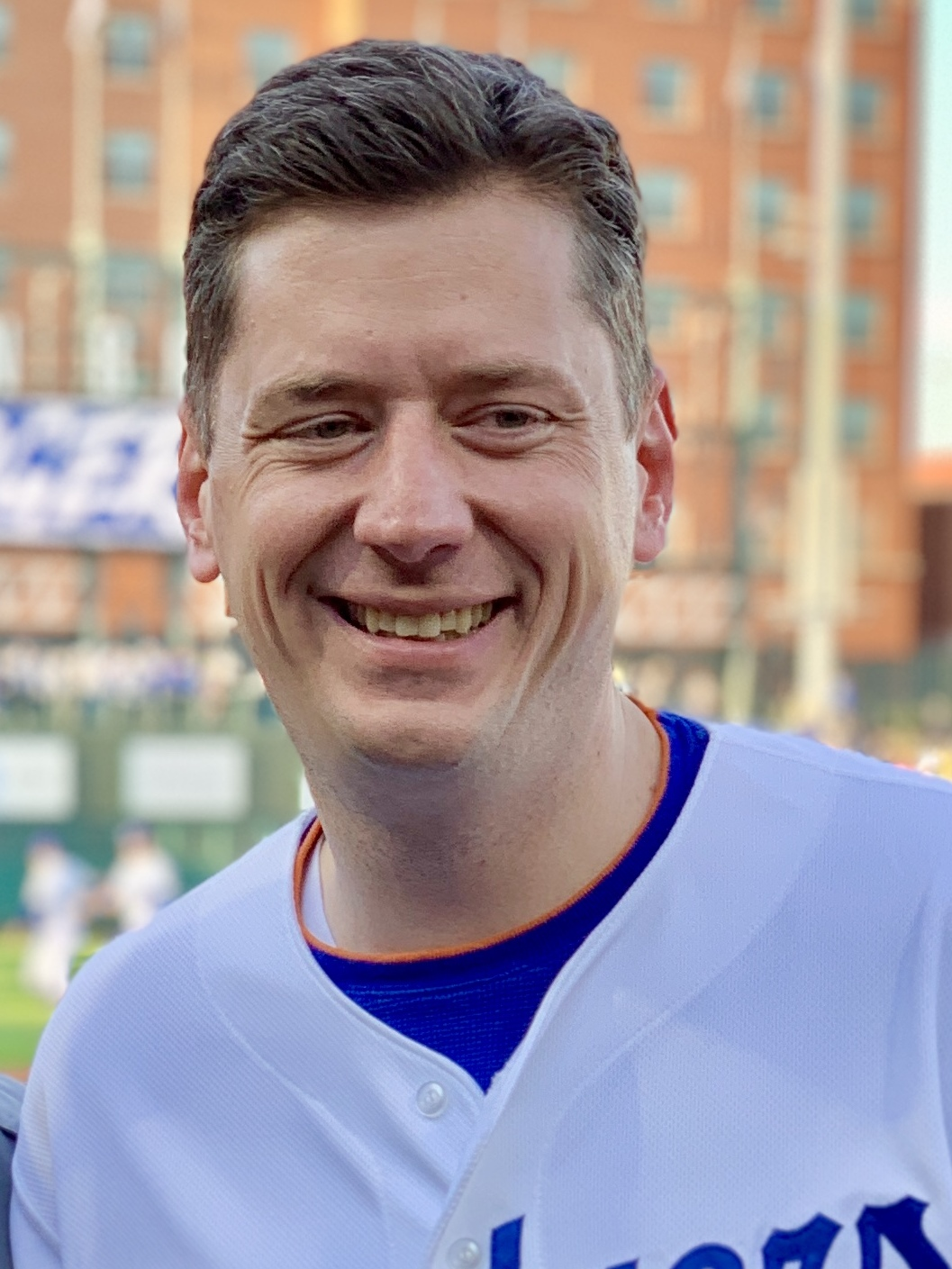
- Holt in 2019

38th Mayor of Oklahoma City
- Incumbent
- Assumed office April 10, 2018
- Preceded by: Mick Cornett

83rd President of the United States Conference of Mayors
- In office 2025–2026
- Preceded by: Andrew Ginther
- Succeeded by: Todd Gloria

Member of the Oklahoma Senate from the 30th district
- In office November 16, 2010 – April 10, 2018
- Preceded by: Glenn Coffee
- Succeeded by: Julia Kirt

Personal details
- Born: March 10, 1979 (age 47) Oklahoma City, Oklahoma, U.S.
- Citizenship: American; Osage Nation
- Party: Republican
- Spouse: Rachel Canuso
- Children: 2
- Education: George Washington University (BA); Oklahoma City University (JD)
- Website: Campaign website

David Holt (born March 10, 1979) is an American and Osage attorney and politician who has served since 2018 as the 38th mayor of Oklahoma City and since 2023 as dean of the Oklahoma City University School of Law. From 2010 to 2018 he represented the 30th district in the Oklahoma Senate.

Holt is Oklahoma City's first Native American mayor and the 83rd president of the United States Conference of Mayors. As mayor, Holt presided over the passage of MAPS 4 in 2019, a $1.1 billion initiative including 16 projects. In 2023, the City Council and ultimately the city's voters approved Holt's proposal to put at least $850 million of taxpayer money toward building a new $900 million arena, in return for an agreement by the Oklahoma City Thunder to play in the new arena for 25 years.

In 2025, Holt announced that two sports and seven events of the 2028 Summer Olympics will be staged in Oklahoma City.

== Early life and education ==
Holt was born and raised in northwest Oklahoma City, the son of Stroud Holt and Mary Ann Fuller Holt. His mother is Osage Native American and his father is white. After graduating from Putnam City North High School in Oklahoma City, Holt earned a B.A. from George Washington University. He earned his Juris Doctor from Oklahoma City University in 2009.

== Early career ==
Holt became active in the Republican Party, serving as an aide to Dennis Hastert when Hastert was Speaker of the House, and during the 9/11 attacks. From 2002 to 2004, he served in the White House Office of Legislative Affairs under President George W. Bush. In 2004, Holt returned full-time to Oklahoma, where he served as the state's campaign coordinator to reelect Bush. He served U.S. Senator Jim Inhofe and Lieutenant Governor Mary Fallin.

In 2006, Holt was appointed chief of staff to Oklahoma City Mayor Mick Cornett, a position he held until his election to the State Senate. Holt wrote Big League City: Oklahoma City's Rise to the NBA (2012), a nonfiction political and sports book published by Full Circle Press. It details the arrival of major league sports in Oklahoma City, culminating with the 2008 relocation there of the National Basketball Association's Seattle SuperSonics, which was renamed the Oklahoma City Thunder.

== Oklahoma State senate ==
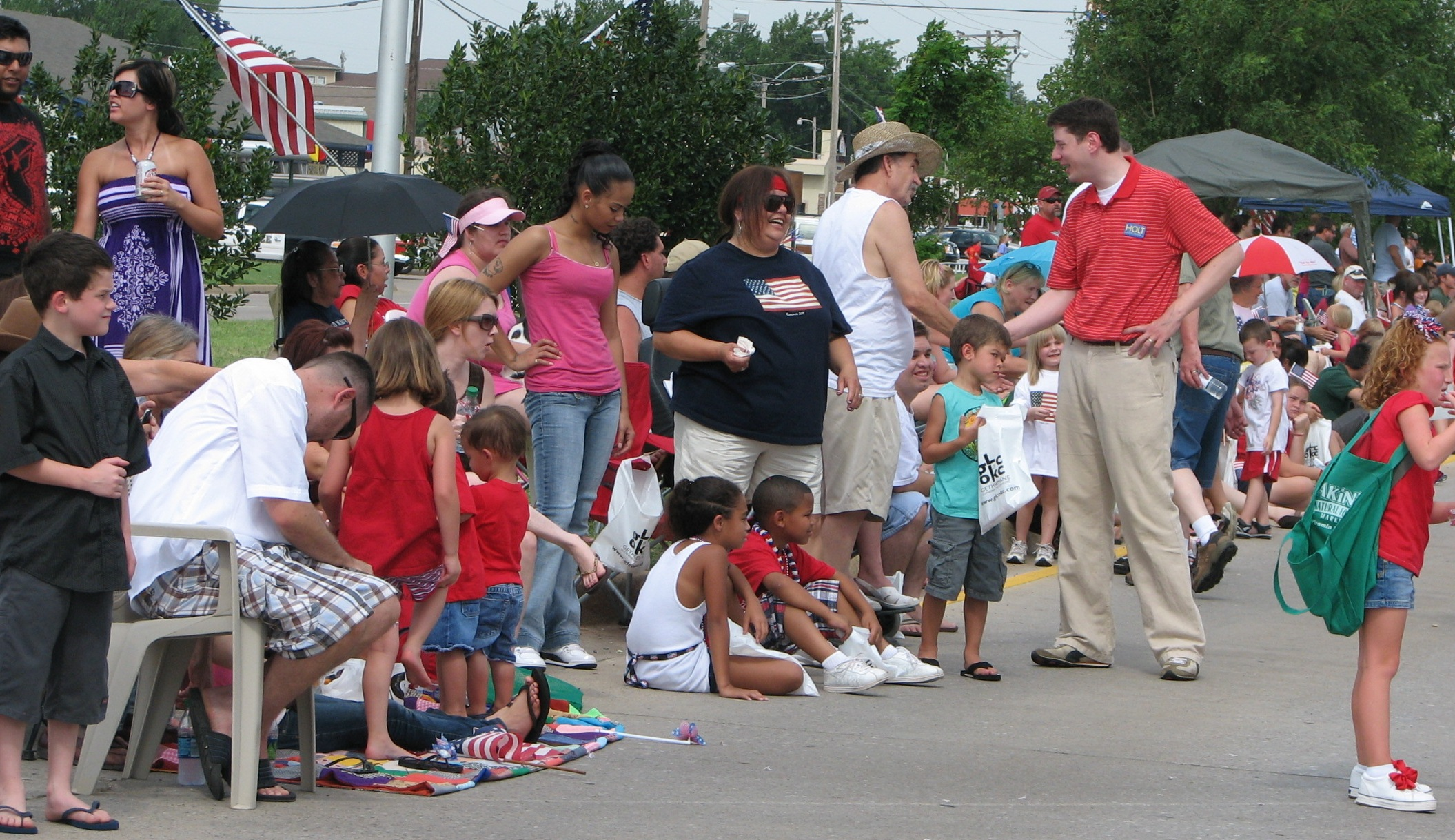
Holt at the Bethany, Oklahoma Independence Day Parade on July 4, 2011

Holt was elected to the State Senate on July 27, 2010, taking 64% of the vote in the Republican primary and running unopposed in the general election. He took office on November 16, 2010. He succeeded Glenn Coffee, the first Republican Senate president pro tempore in Oklahoma history.

In the State Senate, Holt worked on tax issues, aiming to eliminate or reduce income tax. He served as a Republican member of the Electoral College in 2012. In his first term, he was elected Majority Caucus Vice Chair, and for the 2013-14 legislative sessions, Holt was elected majority whip for the Senate Republican caucus. He was also named vice chair of the new Appropriations Subcommittee on Select Agencies.

In 2014, Holt was named director of investor relations for Hall Capital. He has also served as an adjunct professor at Oklahoma City University.

For the 2015 and 2016 sessions, Holt was named chairman of the Appropriations Subcommittee on Select Agencies. He served as campaign chair in Oklahoma for Marco Rubio's presidential campaign in 2015 and 2016. In 2015, Holt worked on election reform, authoring a law that created an online registration system. In 2016, Holt authored a law that created a "revenue stabilization fund" intended to minimize the effect of future revenue shortfalls.

In the State Senate in 2017 and 2018, Holt worked on increasing teacher pay. In the 2017 and 2018 sessions, Holt was named Appropriations Subcommittee Chair for Public Safety and Judiciary.

== Mayor of Oklahoma City ==
=== First term ===
In 2017, Holt announced his candidacy for mayor of Oklahoma City. He was elected mayor on February 13, 2018, defeating Taylor Neighbors and Randall Smith in a nonpartisan race, and sworn in on April 10. He resigned from the state senate before taking office. At the time of his swearing-in, Holt was 39 years and one month old, making him Oklahoma City's youngest mayor since 1923 and the youngest mayor of a U.S. city over 500,000, as well as Oklahoma City's first Native American mayor. In 2019, Holt and city leaders opened the city's new streetcar system, a project funded by MAPS 3.

Holt's second year in office brought the development and passage of MAPS 4, a $1.1 billion initiative to address 16 priorities. The Oklahoman called Holt "the architect" of the "most ambitious MAPS ever". The initiative received 71.7% of the vote on December 10, 2019, a modern record for a sales tax vote in Oklahoma City. MAPS 4 includes funding for a variety of city priorities.

In 2019, Holt was elected to the leadership of the United States Conference of Mayors and named vice-chair of the International Affairs Committee. In 2020, he was elected a trustee of the United States Conference of Mayors and to the board of the National League of Cities. As mayor, Holt has emphasized diversity and community inclusion. In 2019, he joined leaders of five other cities in signing an agreement to form Oklahoma's first Regional Transit Authority (RTA), with plans to build a metropolitan rail system in the years ahead.

Holt enacted a number of firsts in Oklahoma City history: designating "Indigenous Peoples' Day" and "Pride Week" and issuing public statements that Oklahoma City is a diverse community where many residents are immigrants or descendants of immigrants. He has joined official celebrations commemorating the city's civil rights movement and included a $26 million civil rights center in the MAPS 4 initiative. The city also added a diversity and inclusion officer to its staff.

On the day that the first local COVID-19 case was identified during the pandemic, Holt proclaimed a state of emergency, issued a "shelter in place" order for Oklahoma City, and maintained an aggressive response throughout the crisis. When the city experienced a second peak in the summer of 2020, he supported a mask ordinance. Eleven months into the pandemic, Oklahoma City had a death rate lower than all but six other large cities, and 27% lower than the rest of Oklahoma. In the Houston Law Review, Matthew Welsh wrote that, during the pandemic, Holt hid replies on social media that questioned the vaccine's efficacy or Oklahoma City's vaccination rate. Holt also hid replies that included profanity or asked that he pick up yard signs after a campaign. Welsh argued Holt's actions likely violated the 1st Amendment.

During the 2020 protests following the murder of George Floyd in Minneapolis, Holt attended protests. He met with Black Lives Matter leaders and created a task force to look at law enforcement policies and a task force to look at reinstatement of the city's Human Rights Commission.

On April 19, 2020, the 25th anniversary of the Oklahoma City bombing, Holt spoke at the ceremony. In March 2021, he opened a $288 million convention center. In May 2021, Holt authored and passed legislation to repeal 85% of Oklahoma City's occupational licenses. In July 2021, he and other Oklahoma City leaders announced their support for the expansion of Tinker Air Force Base, Oklahoma City's largest employer. In September 2021, Holt and tribal leaders opened the new First Americans Museum, a $175 million facility dedicated to telling the Native American story.

In June 2021, a publicly released poll of Oklahoma City voters found that Holt was favored by Republicans 54%-19% and by Democrats 61%-12%. The pollster wrote, "In today's political environment, it is very unusual to see a candidate who is able to draw such support from members of both parties." In April 2022, Holt led a delegation of 12 mayors to Israel, where they met with various officials, including the mayors of Tel Aviv and Jerusalem.

=== Second term ===
Holt was reelected to a second term on February 8, 2022, receiving 59.8% of the vote in four-way, nonpartisan race, 40 points ahead of his nearest competitor. The election featured the largest voter turnout for an Oklahoma City mayoral election since 1959, and Holt received more votes than any candidate for Oklahoma City mayor since 1959.

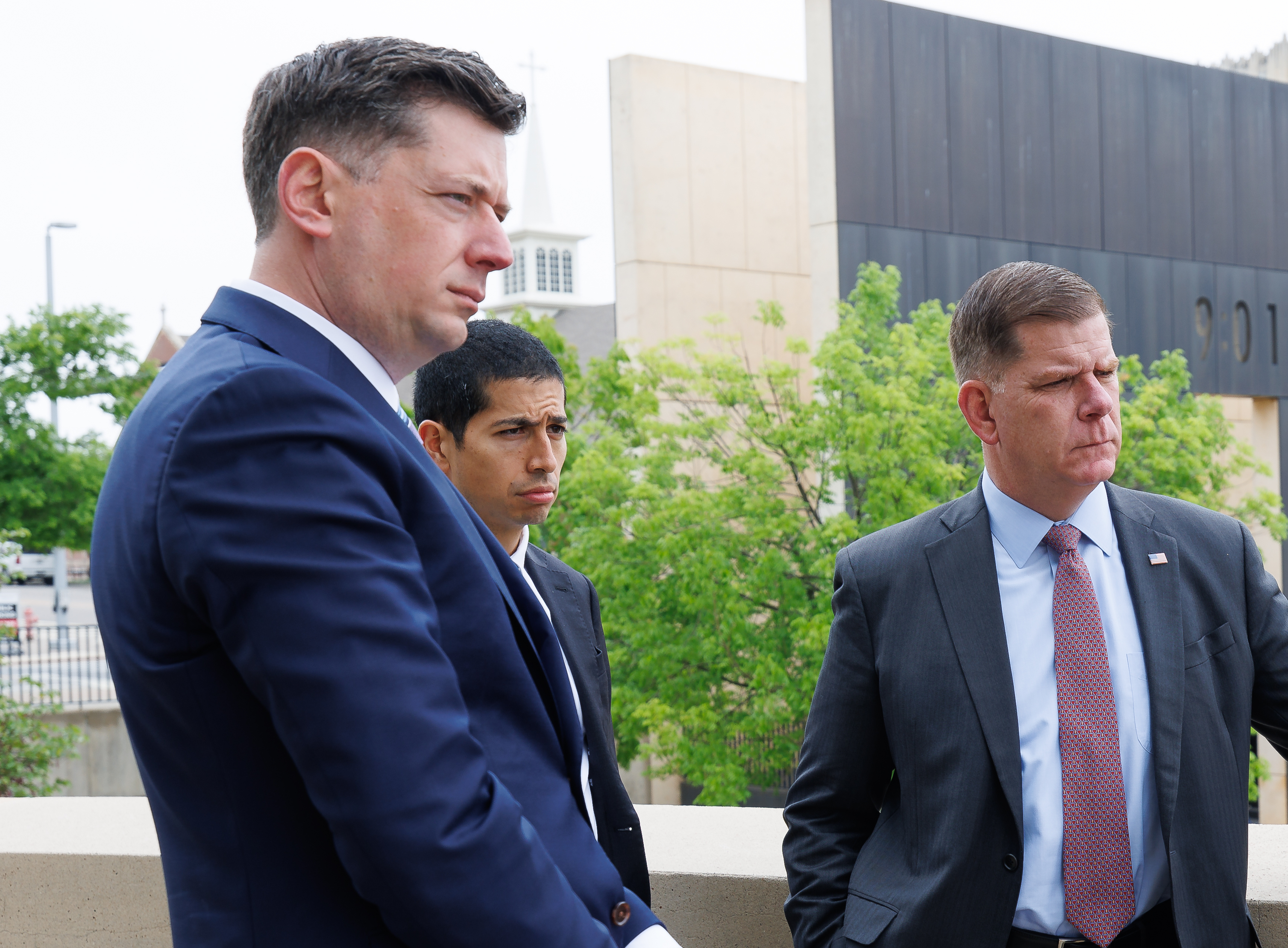
Holt with U.S. Labor Secretary Marty Walsh in Oklahoma City, May 2022

Holt's second term began in May 2022. The next month, Holt broke ground on the city's first Bus Rapid Transit line, a 9.5 mile, $28.9 million transit project. In July 2022, the Oklahoma City Council recreated a Human Rights Commission, which it had lacked since 1996. Adoption resulted from a task force Holt created in the summer of 2020. The new Human Rights Commission passed 5–4, with Holt casting one of the five affirmative votes.

In November 2022, Holt supported a bond issue for public education, a nearly $1 billion proposal for school infrastructure. The two ballot questions each received over 60% approval from voters. In May, it was announced Holt would serve as dean of the Oklahoma City University School of Law starting July 1, 2023, while also remaining mayor. In June 2023, Holt was elected president of the United States Conference of Mayors for 2025–2026. In August 2023, Holt spoke on the steps of the Lincoln Memorial at the 60th anniversary of the March on Washington.

In September 2023, Holt announced a plan to publicly fund a new arena in downtown Oklahoma City in exchange for a commitment from the Oklahoma City Thunder to stay in Oklahoma City beyond 2050. A supporter of the arena proposal, Holt said the team would leave Oklahoma City without a new arena. Under the agreement, taxpayers would pay at least $850 million of the cost of the arena while the team, valued at $3 billion, would pay $50 million. The proposal led to wide public debate. Holt and other proponents of the proposal argued that the team's presence in Oklahoma City was vital for the city's "big league" status and worth $580 million per year to the city's economy. Opponents argued for the potential resources to be used directly on infrastructure or social services. Economists who specialize in the study of stadium subsidies strongly criticized the deal and were skeptical of its purported benefits. In a December 2023 referendum, 71% of Oklahoma City voters approved a six-year sales tax to fund the arena.

In 2025, Holt announced that two sports, encompassing seven events—canoe slalom and softball—will be staged in their entirety in Oklahoma City during the 2028 Summer Olympics. Oklahoma City is the only city outside southern California slated to host the entirety of a sport during the 2028 Summer Olympics.

In June 2025, Holt became the 83rd president of the United States Conference of Mayors. When the 2024–25 Oklahoma City Thunder won the 2025 NBA Finals that month, Holt was one of many Oklahoma politicians who celebrated the victory.

=== Third term ===
Holt was reelected to a third term on February 10, 2026, with 86.49% of the vote in two-way, nonpartisan race, defeating Matthew Pallares. His share of the vote was the second-highest in city history, behind Mick Cornett's 87.6% in 2006.

== Political positions ==
=== Opposition to Trumpism ===
As a Republican, Holt has opposed Trumpism.

== Personal life ==
Holt is married to Rachel Canuso Holt, and they have two children. She is the president and CEO of United Way of Central Oklahoma. The family is Episcopalian.

== Electoral history ==
2010 Oklahoma State Senate District 30 election
Party	Candidate	Votes	%	±%
Republican	David Holt	5,125	63.59	
Republican	Matt Jackson	2,934	36.41	
Turnout		8,059		

In 2014, Holt was reelected to a second term in the Oklahoma Senate without opposition and no election was held.

2018 Oklahoma City nonpartisan mayoral election
Party	Candidate	Votes	%	±%
Nonpartisan	David Holt	20,409	78.5	
Nonpartisan	Taylor Neighbors	3,443	13.2	
Nonpartisan	Randall Smith	2,138	8.2	
Turnout		25,990		

2022 Oklahoma City nonpartisan mayoral election
Party	Candidate	Votes	%	±%
Nonpartisan	David Holt	36,338	59.8	
Nonpartisan	Frank Urbanic	12,111	19.9	
Nonpartisan	Carol Hefner	8,285	13.6	
Nonpartisan	Jimmy Lawson	4,022	6.6	
Turnout		60,756		

2026 Oklahoma City nonpartisan mayoral election
Party	Candidate	Votes	%	±%
Nonpartisan	David Holt	33,625	86.49	
Nonpartisan	Matthew Pallares	5,253	13.51	
Turnout		38,878		

== See also ==
- List of mayors of the 50 largest cities in the United States

== Works cited ==
- Welsh, Matthew W. (June 2, 2023). "Sorry Losers and Haters: How Current Public Forum Analysis of Twitter Posts Allows for Silence of Dissent and Violations of Rights". Houston Law Review. 60 (5).

Political offices
Preceded by Mick Cornett	Mayor of Oklahoma City; 2018–present	Incumbent
