= List of public art in Oklahoma City =

List of public artworks in Oklahoma City, Oklahoma, U.S.

The following public artworks have been installed in Oklahoma City, in the U.S. state of Oklahoma:

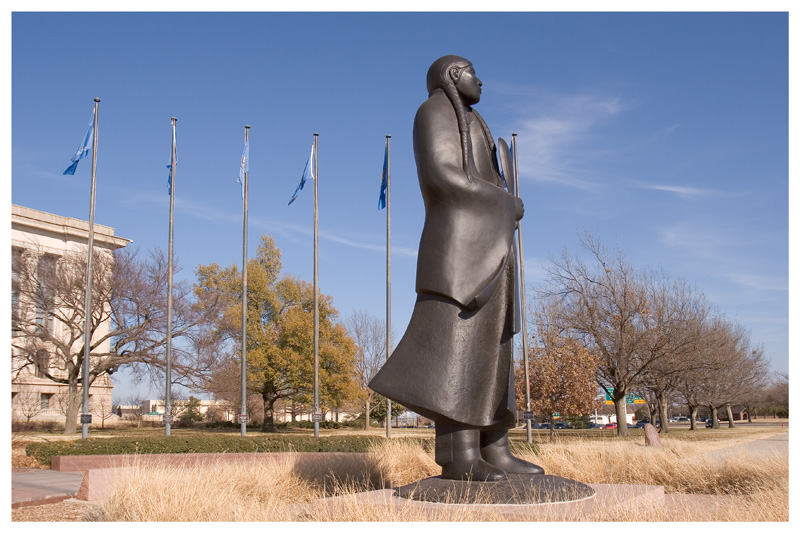
As Long as the Waters Flow

Vigil

- Air Force Monument
- And Jesus Wept
- As Long as the Waters Flow
- Authentic Alaskan Totem Pole
- The Ballerina
- Bicentennial Monument
- Bob Hope
- Bust of Robert S. Kerr
- Casady School Abstract
- Centaurs and People
- Centennial Land Run Monument
- The Chimp
- Christ
- Christopher Norris Berry Memorial Fountain
- Collage
- The Conductor
- Curious Organism (2009)
- Destiny
- The Devon Mosaic: As Long as the Waters Flow
- Dwight David Eisenhower
- Espanola #21
- The Eternal Challenge
- Exclamation Point!
- Falling Water
- Family Tree Sculpture
- First Reader
- Foundation
- Fountain
- Galaxy
- Ganesia
- Gateway
- Girl with Rabbit
- Gorilla
- The Guardian
- Hand Pump
- Homecoming
- Inclined
- Investigation, Analysis and Publication
- Iron Feathers
- Lt. General Thomas P. Stafford
- Oklahoma City National Memorial
- Oklahoma's Native Son (2005), Will Rogers World Airport
- Orval O. "Sandy" Saunders
- Philodendron Dome
- Pioneer Preacher
- Pioneers of 1889
- Promenade
- Rosie the Riveter
- Run of 1889
- The Runners
- Seagulls
- Shakespeare
- Skydance Bridge
- Spirit of '76 Statuary
- Statue of Jim Thorpe
- Statue of Johnny Bench
- Statue of Liberty
- Statue of Mickey Mantle
- Statue of Stanley Draper
- Statue of Warren Spahn
- Sundial
- Ten Commandments Monument
- The Three Madonnas
- Totem #14
- Tree of Life
- Tribute to Range Riders
- Unity
- The Vela
- Vigil
- Water Music
- We Remember April 1995
- We Three
- Where the Earth Meets the Sky
- Will Rogers
- William Bill Gill, Jr.
- Wind Walker
