= Bicentennial Park (Oklahoma City) =

Park in Oklahoma City, Oklahoma, U.S.

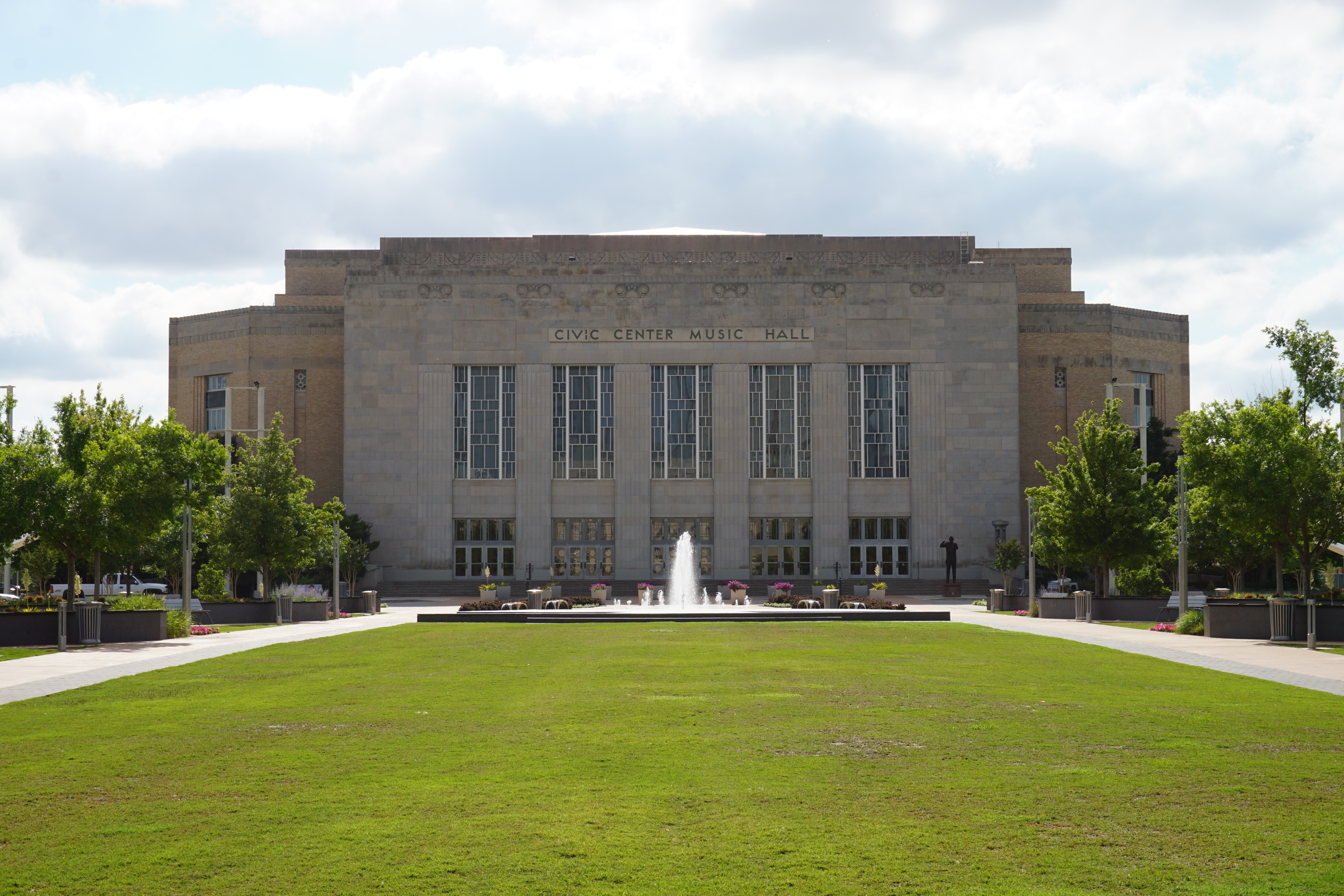
- The park in front of the Civic Center Music Hall, 2016

- Location within Oklahoma
- Interactive map of Bicentennial Park
- Location: Oklahoma City, Oklahoma, U.S.
- Coordinates: 35°28′8.5″N 97°31′19″W

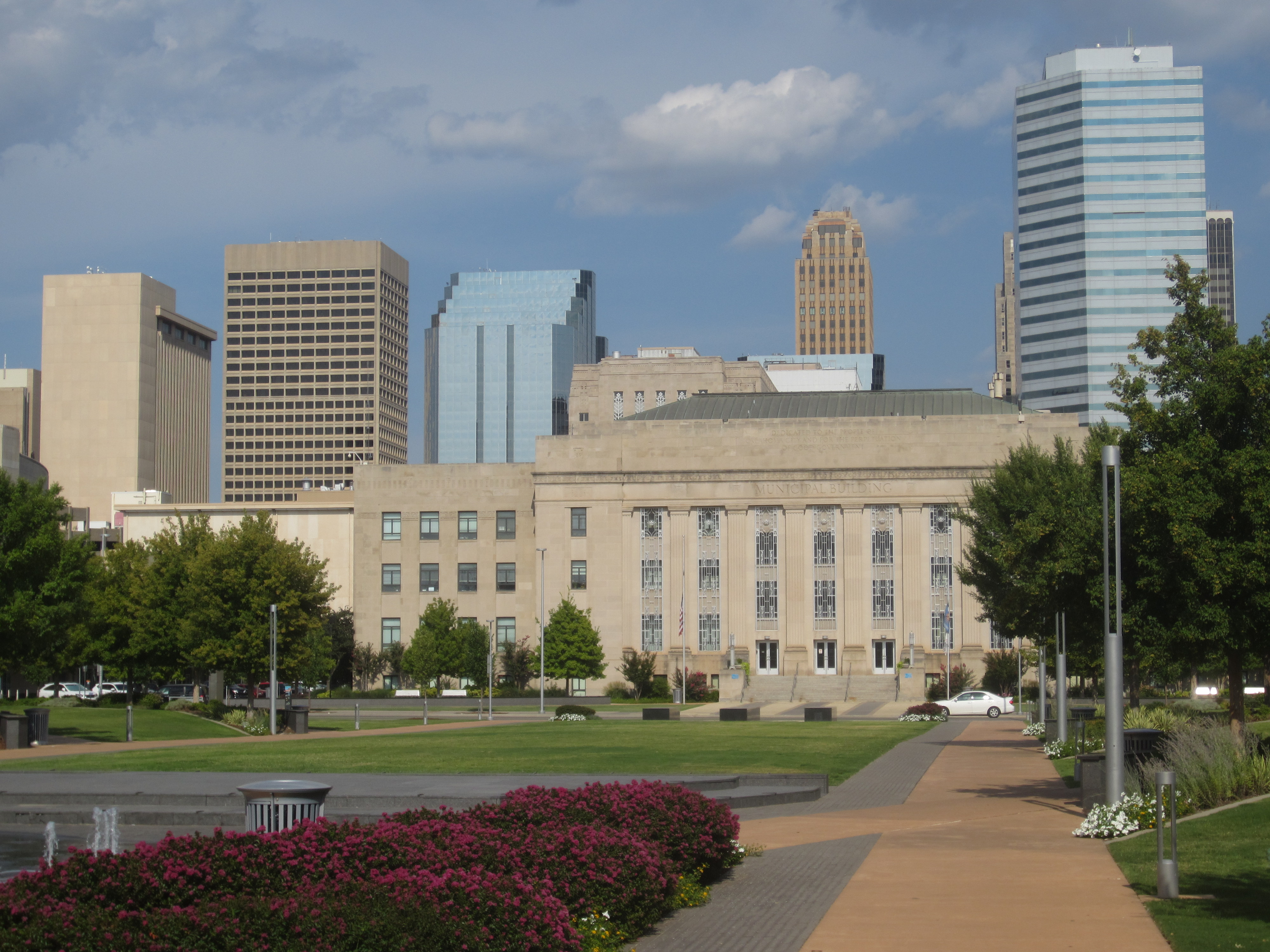
The park with downtown Oklahoma City in the background, 2019

Bicentennial Park is an urban park in Oklahoma City, in the U.S. state of Oklahoma. The park is located east of Civic Center Music Hall, and is bordered by Couch Drive on the north, Colcord Drive on the south, and Walker Avenue on the east.

== Features ==
The Bicentennial Monument, and the sculptures Run of 1889 and The Conductor, are installed in the park.

The statue of Stanley Draper used to be installed in the park, before being relocated outside City Hall.

== History ==
In 2016, following the election of Donald Trump, approximately 100 people gathered at Bicentennial Park for the "Nonviolent Protest of Trump and a Rally for Peace and Love".

The Festival of the Arts has been held in the park, as has the music event "Wiggle Out Loud".
