= Chickasaw Plaza =

Plaza in Oklahoma City, Oklahoma, U.S.

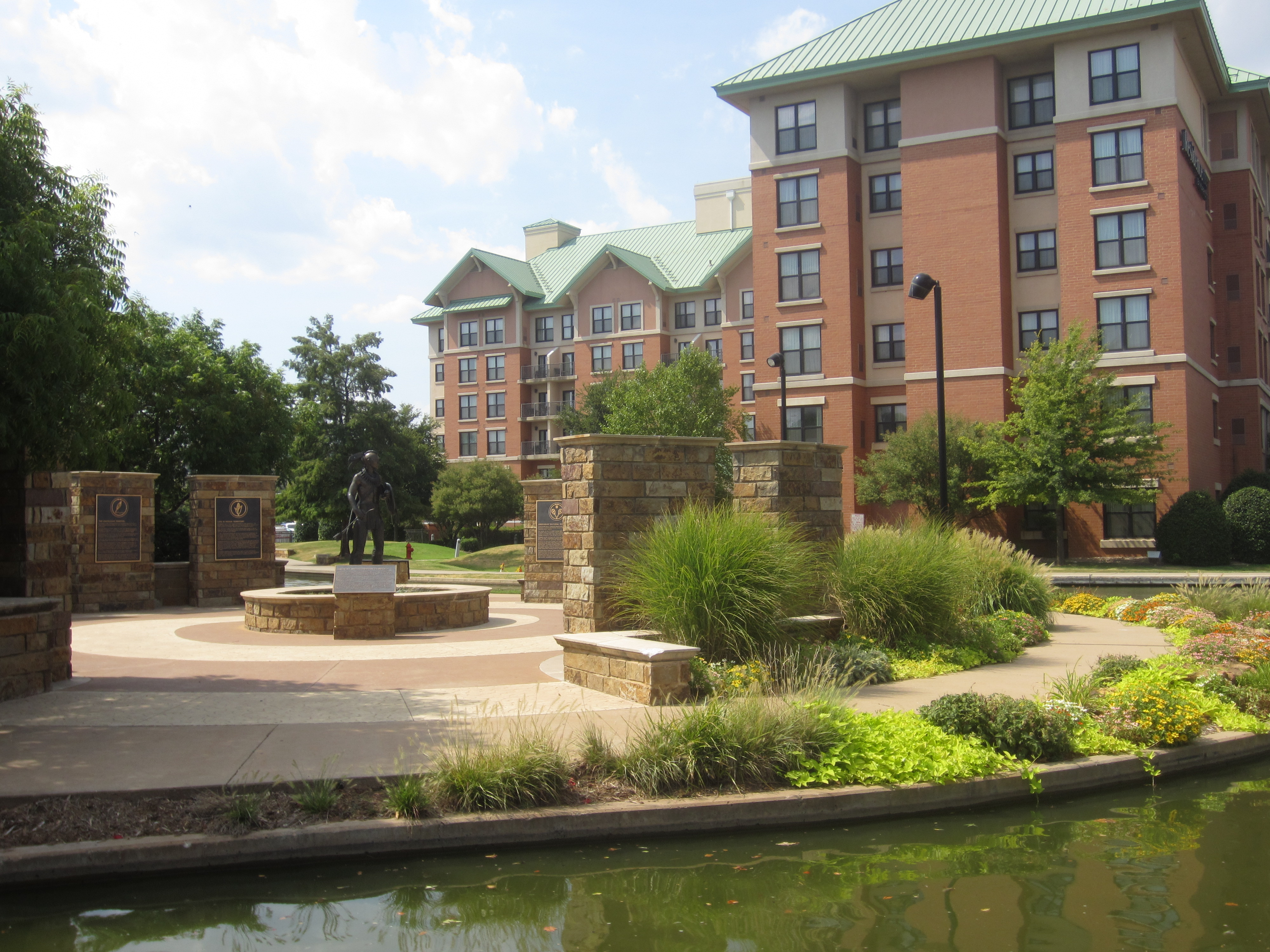
- The plaza in 2019

- Location within Oklahoma
- Type: Plaza
- Location: Bricktown, Oklahoma City
- Coordinates: 35.4629°N 97.50532°W

Chickasaw Plaza is a plaza along the Bricktown Canal in Bricktown, Oklahoma City, in the U.S. state of Oklahoma. The plaza features a statue of a Chickasaw warrior, which was sponsored by the Chickasaw Nation, as well as markers describing the tribe's history and land loss following the Indian Removal Act and Trail of Tears.

== See also ==
- List of public art in Oklahoma City
