= Survivor Tree =

Tree in Oklahoma City, Oklahoma, U.S.

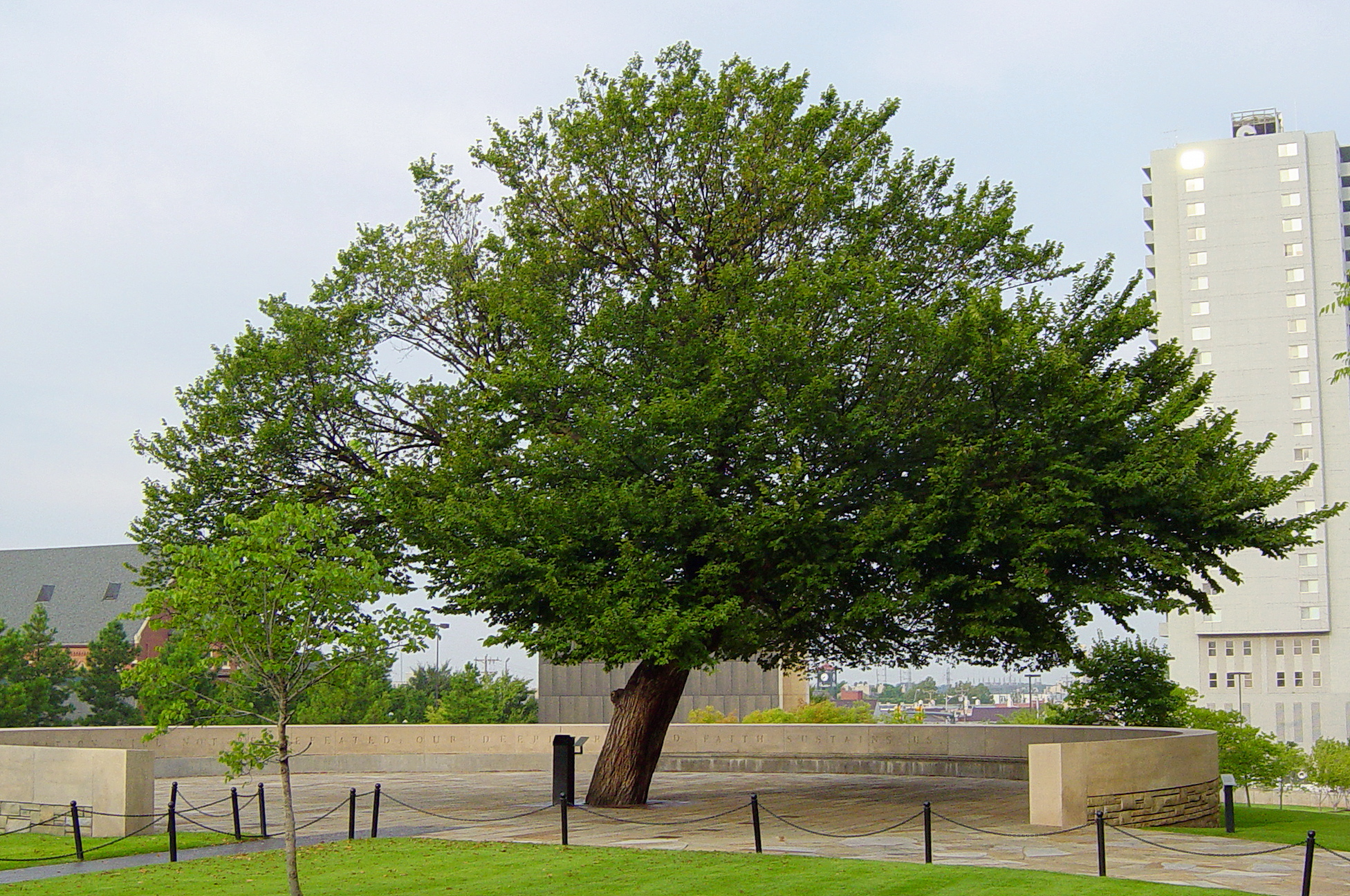
- The tree in 2004

- Location within Oklahoma
- Coordinates: 35°28′24″N 97°31′00″W

The Survivor Tree is an American elm which survived the 1995 Oklahoma City bombing. It is on the north side of the Oklahoma City National Memorial in the US state of Oklahoma.

== Description and history ==
This was the only shade tree in the parking lot across the street from the Alfred P. Murrah Federal Building. Commuters arrived early to get one of the shady parking spots provided by its branches. Photos of Oklahoma City taken in the 1920s show the tree to be about 100 years old (in the year 2000). Heavily damaged by the bomb, the tree survived after nearly being cut down during the initial investigation, when workers wanted to recover evidence hanging in its branches and embedded in its bark.

The force of the blast ripped most of the branches from the Survivor Tree. Glass and debris were embedded in its trunk and fire from the cars parked beneath it blackened what was left. Most thought the tree could not survive. Almost a year after the bombing, family members, survivors, and rescue workers gathered for a memorial ceremony by the tree, noticed it was beginning to bloom again. The Survivor Tree now thrives, and the Outdoor Memorial design includes a mandate to feature and protect the tree. For example, one of the roots that would have been cut by the wall surrounding the tree was placed inside a large pipe so it could reach the soil beyond the wall without being damaged. The decking around the tree was raised several feet to make an underground crawlspace; workers enter through a secure hatchway and monitor the health of the tree and maintain its very deep roots.

The inscription around the inside of the deck wall around the Survivor Tree reads:

"The spirit of this city and this nation will not be defeated; our deeply rooted faith sustains us."

Hundreds of seeds from the Survivor Tree are planted annually and the resulting saplings are distributed each year on the anniversary of the bombing. Thousands of Survivor Trees are growing in public and private places all over the United States.

Also some clones of the tree have been produced. As of 2019, less than a dozen clones exist, one of which may some day take the place of the original Survivor Tree.

== See also ==
- List of individual trees
