= Ainslee Cox =

American conductor (1936–1988)

Ainslee Cox (June 22, 1936, Big Spring, Texas – September 5, 1988, New York City) was an American conductor. A graduate of Westminster Choir College and the University of Texas at Austin, he was associate conductor of the American Symphony Orchestra in 1962 under Leopold Stokowski and later an assistant conductor of the New York Philharmonic under both Leonard Bernstein and Pierre Boulez.

Beginning in 1968, he served as co-conductor of the Goldman Band with its founder Richard Franko Goldman, and was sole conductor of the band from 1979 until his death in 1988. From 1974–1978, he was music director of the Oklahoma Symphony Orchestra, and from 1980–1982, he was music director of the Chamber Opera Theater of New York.

He died from Hodgkin's lymphoma at Mount Sinai West in New York City in 1988 at the age of 52.

== See also ==
- The Conductor (sculpture)
