= Oklahoma City Philharmonic =

Symphony orchestra in Oklahoma City

- Orchestra
- Founded: 1924; 1938; 1988
- Concert hall: Civic Center Music Hall
- Principal conductor: Alexander Mickelthwate
- Website: www.okcphil.org

The Oklahoma City Philharmonic is an American symphony orchestra in Oklahoma City, Oklahoma.

== History ==
As is the case with many American symphony orchestras, the Oklahoma City Philharmonic owes a degree of its heritage to two predecessor professional symphonic orchestras in the city, the first having been launched in 1924 as the Oklahoma City Symphony Orchestra. As a marker in history, the orchestra finished the 1928–1929 season, its fifth consecutive season, having performed 7 concerts during the winter to audiences of 2,000 in the Shrine Auditorium that had been erected in 1923.

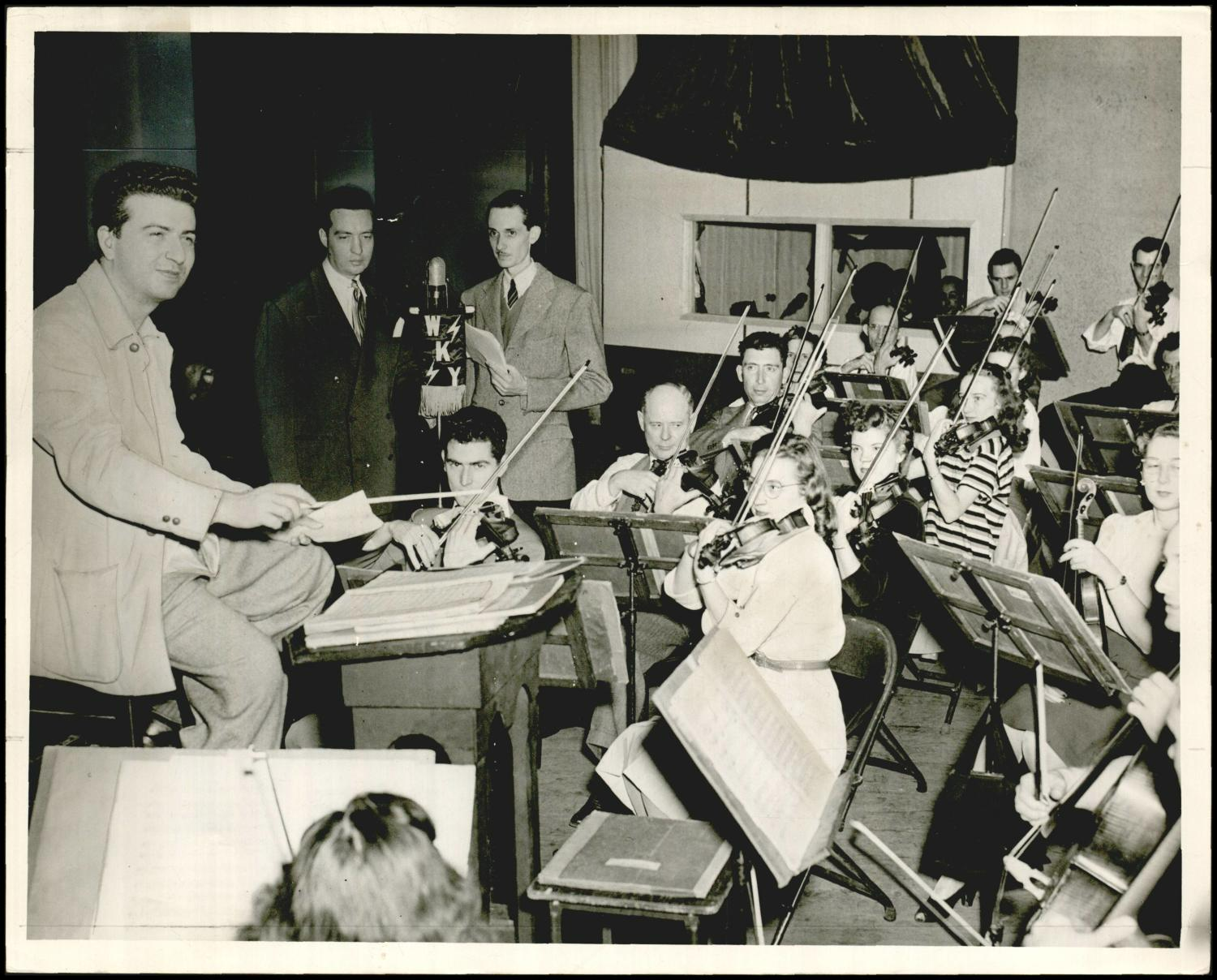
The Orchestra preparing for an NBC radio broadcast in February, 1946

The Second Oklahoma Symphony Orchestra was founded in 1938 with Ralph Asher Rose, Jr. (1911–1984) conducting the inaugural season. Rose was an Oklahoma City-born virtuoso violinist. He grew up in Bayside, New York, studied with Michael Press, and at Curtis beginning at age 12, then at Juilliard. He then worked as a violinist in Dallas. During the 1940s, 1950s and 1960s, under conductors Victor Alessandro and Guy Fraser Harrison (1894–1986), the Oklahoma Symphony attained national and international rank on several levels, helped by a regular series of radio broadcasts on the Mutual Broadcasting System and the Voice of America for American troops abroad. Conductor Ainslee Cox led the orchestra from 1974 to 1978.

In 1988, when the Oklahoma Symphony Orchestra was disbanded, Joel Alan Levine spearheaded the founding of the Oklahoma City Philharmonic with the help of individuals, corporations, and philanthropic institutions — culturally-minded civic leaders, the newly incorporated Oklahoma City Orchestra League, Inc., and grants from five major Oklahoma corporations (Oklahoma Gas & Electric, Oklahoma Publishing Company, Southwestern Bell, Kerr McGee, and First Interstate Bank). Adding Levine's nine consecutive seasons as associate conductor of the Oklahoma City Symphony (from 1979 to 1987), and his thirty-eight-year tenure as music director and conductor of the Oklahoma City Philharmonic, he led the orchestra for forty-seven consecutive seasons, the longest of anyone in the City's history. In the 2017–2018 season, Alexander Mickelthwate joined the orchestra as "music director designate" while he finished his term as music director of the Winnipeg Symphony Orchestra. He became music director for the 2018 season, and in November Levine became "Music Director Emeritus", while continuing to work as the orchestra's archivist and historian.

In September 2001, the OKC Philharmonic opened its season in the newly renovated Civic Center Music Hall. The renovation was one of several Metropolitan Area Projects (MAPS) and cost $52.2 million, resulting in a complete transformation of the performance chamber into the Thelma Gaylord Performing Arts Theater. In addition to a complete interior renovation, the new music hall included a multistory atrium, improved acoustics and a hydraulic orchestra pit. The philharmonic is the largest professional performing-arts organization in the state, in terms of budget and performers employed.

== See also ==
- The Conductor (sculpture)
