= Alexander Mickelthwate =

German-born conductor (born 1970)

Alexander Mickelthwate (born 2 June 1970 in Frankfurt, West Germany) is a German-born conductor who is the current music director and principal conductor of Oklahoma City Philharmonic.

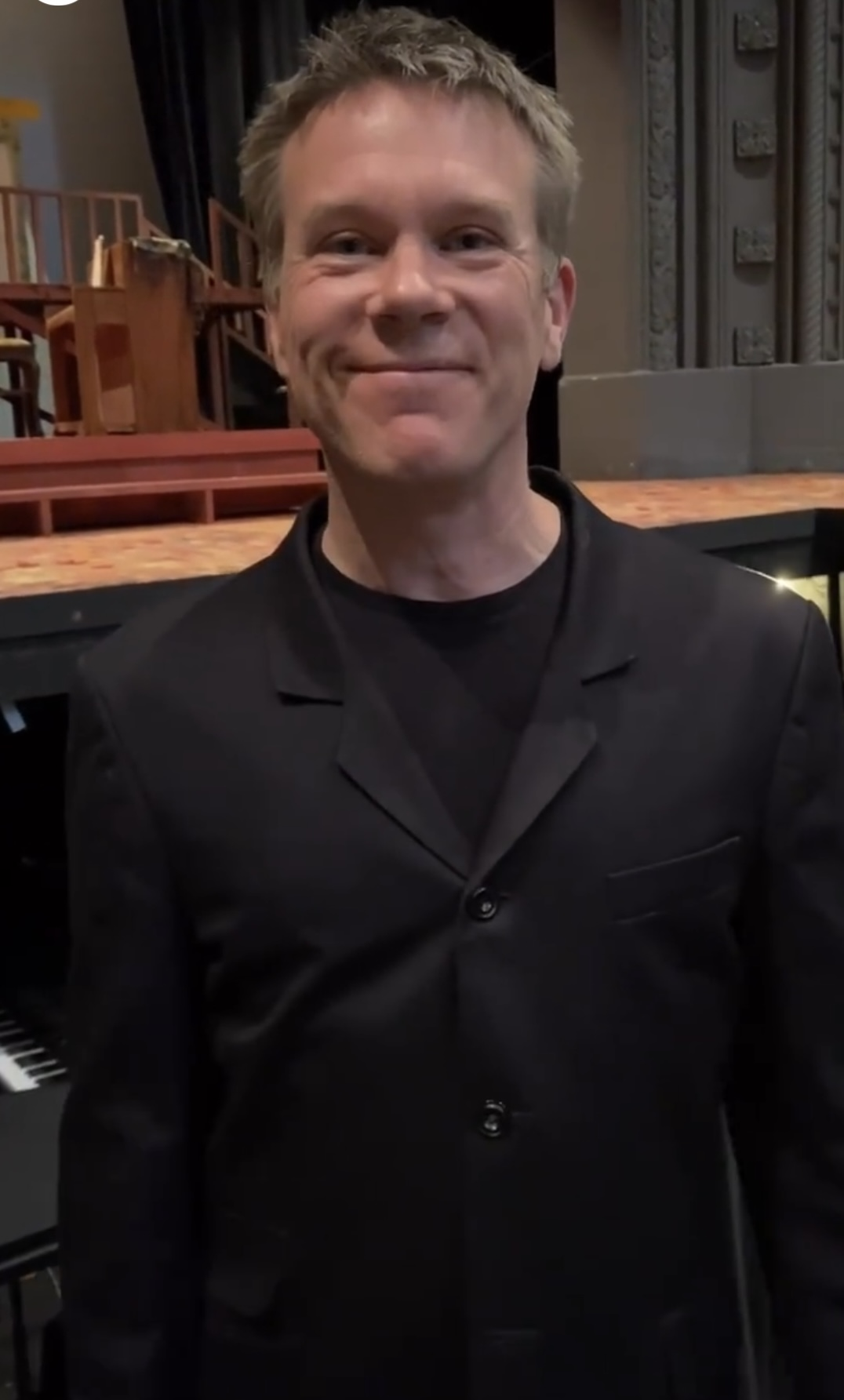
Mickelthwate in 2022 at the Kirkpatrick Fine Arts Center in Oklahoma City.

== Early life and education ==
He is one of three sons in his family, and studied piano and cello as a youth. He studied piano performance and conducting in Karlsruhe, Germany, and participated in international conducting courses in Austria and France. He took additional studies at the Peabody Institute of Johns Hopkins University.

== Career ==
Mickelthwate served as assistant conductor of the Atlanta Symphony through the 2003–2004 season. During his tenure there, he founded the new music ensemble Bent Frequency. From 2004 to 2006, he served as assistant conductor of the Los Angeles Philharmonic. He was promoted to associate conductor for the 2006–2007 season and concluded his Los Angeles tenure in August 2007.

In February 2006, Mickelthwate was named the music director of the Winnipeg Symphony Orchestra (WSO), and took up the post in September 2006, with an initial contract of 3 years. In December 2008, Mickelthwate extended his contract with the orchestra through the 2012 season. His Winnipeg contract was afterward extended through the 2015–2016 season. He concluded his Winnipeg tenure at the close of the 2017–2018 season.

In November 2016, Mickelthwate first guest-conducted the Oklahoma City Philharmonic. In May 2017, the orchestra named him its next music director, and he became music director beginning with the 2018–2019 season.

In March 2022, Mickelthwate accepted the position as music director of the Bear Valley Music Festival.

== Personal life ==
Mickelthwate and the fashion designer Abigail Camp married in 1997, and they have two sons. Mickelthwate and Camp divorced in 2024.
