= Chickasaw Bricktown Ballpark =

Stadium in Oklahoma City, Oklahoma, US

- The Brick

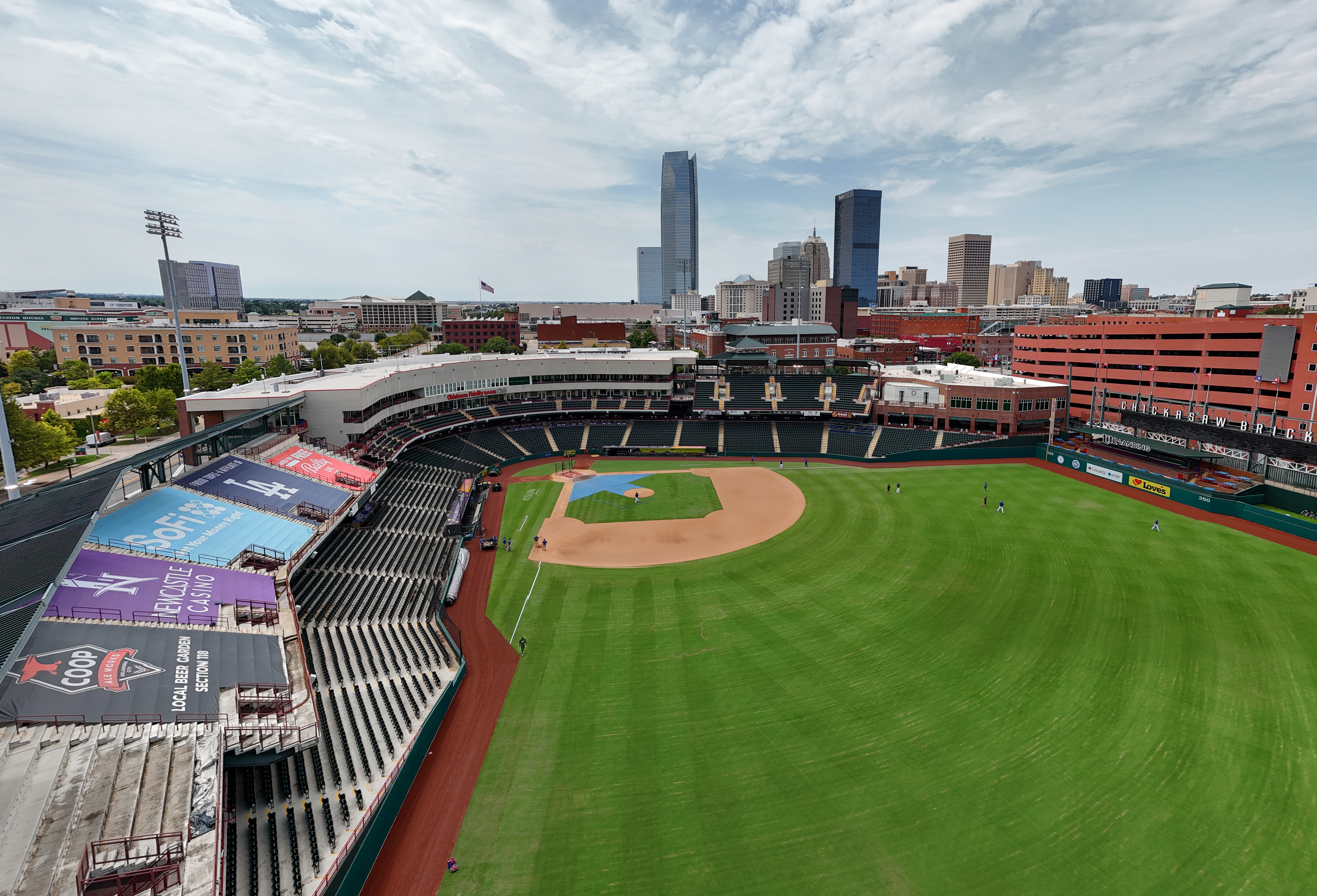
- The ballpark in 2024

- Location within Oklahoma Location within the United States
- Former names: Southwestern Bell Bricktown Ballpark; SBC Bricktown Ballpark; AT&T Bricktown Ballpark; RedHawks Field at Bricktown; Newcastle Field at Bricktown
- Location: 2 South Mickey Mantle Drive; Oklahoma City, Oklahoma; United States
- Coordinates: 35°27′53.86″N 97°30′28.98″W
- Owner: City of Oklahoma City
- Operator: Oklahoma City Comets
- Capacity: 9,000
- Executive suites: 40
- Surface: Tifway 419 Bermuda
- Field size: Left field: 325 ft (99 m); Center field: 400 ft (120 m); Right field: 325 ft (99 m)
- Public transit: OKC Streetcar Ballpark
- Parking: 600

Construction
- Groundbreaking: October 10, 1995
- Opened: April 16, 1998
- Cost: US$34 million ($67.2 million in 2025 dollars)
- Architects: Architectural Design Group, Inc.
- Project managers: White & Associates
- Structural engineers: Zahl-Ford, Inc.
- Services engineer: PSA Consulting Engineers
- General contractor: Oscar J. Boldt Construction Co.

Tenant
- Oklahoma City Comets (PCL) 1998–present

Website
- https://www.milb.com/oklahoma-city/ballpark/chickasaw-bricktown-ballpark

Chickasaw Bricktown Ballpark opened in 1998 in downtown Oklahoma City's Bricktown Entertainment District, replacing All Sports Stadium. It is the home of the Oklahoma City Comets, the Triple-A affiliate of the Los Angeles Dodgers Major League Baseball team. The park has seating for up to 13,066 fans and currently utilizes a seating capacity of 9,000 for OKC games.

The stadium frequently hosted the Phillips 66 Big 12 baseball tournament, which was played there from 2005 to 2021 with the exception of 2015 and 2020. The first Big 12 tournament was held at All Sports Stadium in 1997 before moving to Bricktown in 1998. The ballpark also often hosts games of the Bedlam Series, in which the Oklahoma Sooners face the Oklahoma State Cowboys.

The ballpark also hosts numerous other events both during and outside the baseball season. Those events include the Oklahoma High School Baseball Series in March, the snow tubing WinterFest November–January, a variety of community walks and runs, concerts, parties, corporate outings, meetings, seminars and more.

== Construction ==
Oklahoma City voters approved a temporary one-cent sales tax increase in December 1993 to fund the Metropolitan Area Projects Plan (MAPS), the city's capital improvement program created to build and upgrade sports, recreation, entertainment, cultural and convention facilities. During the 66 months the sales tax was in effect, more than $309 million was collected.

The $34 million Chickasaw Bricktown Ballpark became the first major MAPS structure to be completed, helping spark a revitalization in Bricktown. Architectural Design Group of Oklahoma City served as the ballpark's architect and Oscar J. Boldt Construction Co., was the ballpark's general contractor.

Groundbreaking ceremonies were held on October 10, 1995, but actual construction did not begin until August 1996 due to escalating construction costs and the redesign of the ballpark by architects. The ballpark opened on April 16, 1998 with the RedHawks falling to the Edmonton Trappers 6–3 in front of a sellout crowd of 14,066 fans.

== Features ==
Statues of legendary baseball players with Oklahoma ties stand before the ballpark's three main gates.

A 7-foot-6 bronze statue of Mickey Mantle stands on a 3-foot granite base at the third base pavilion. Mantle, the New York Yankees' switch-hitting star, was born in Spavinaw and raised in Commerce. The Baseball Hall of Fame centerfielder's statue was dedicated on the ballpark's opening day April 16, 1998.

Baseball Hall of Fame catcher Johnny Bench grew up in Binger, and a nine-foot statue of the former Cincinnati Reds star greets fans at the ballpark's home plate gate. The statue was dedicated July 27, 2001.

A statue of Baseball Hall of Fame pitcher Warren Spahn was dedicated July 2, 2005. The Cy Young Award-winning left-hander hailed from Buffalo, New York, but chose to make Broken Arrow and Hartshorne his home after managing the Tulsa Drillers from 1967-71. His statue sits outside of the ballpark's right field gate.

Approximately 480,000 bricks make up the exterior of the ballpark, which mixes retro charm with modern accommodations. A 10-foot-tall, 185-foot-long LED video board was added in left field for the 2011 season.

The ballpark has received numerous accolades since its opening in 1998, including being named the No. 2 minor league ballpark in the country by Baseball America the year it opened and being hailed as one of the country's top 10 minor league stadiums in the 2013 10Best Readers' Choice Awards, presented by USA Today.

The ballpark has 30 entertainment suites on the upper level along with the Oklahoma Fidelity Bank Club (with 10 attached suites), Legends Lounge, Party Pouch, Budweiser Deck, Baseline Patio, Skyline Deck and Picnic area. There is also two lawn areas and a playground on the east side of the park.

== Name changes ==
The stadium was to be called "Southwestern Bell Park." When the general public learned that Bricktown wasn't part of the name, there was an uproar. Due to public pressure, the stadium opened as Southwestern Bell Bricktown Ballpark (later SBC Bricktown Ballpark after Southwestern Bell's name change). In March 2006, the ballpark was renamed AT&T Bricktown Ballpark following the merger between SBC and Old AT&T. After AT&T reevaluated its sports marketing strategy, they gave up naming rights, resulting in the RedHawks Field at Bricktown designation for 2011.

On April 4, 2012, it was announced that Newcastle Gaming Center in the nearby suburb of Newcastle (owned by the Chickasaw Nation) had purchased naming rights to the ballpark, with the new Newcastle Field at Bricktown name effective immediately. The name change led to public outcry, principally over the prospect of a suburb's name appearing on a city-owned building. One day later on April 5, 2012 (the opening day of the 2012 RedHawks season), Newcastle Gaming Center announced that it would once again rename the ballpark as the Chickasaw Bricktown Ballpark.

== Notable games ==
- The ballpark opened April 16, 1998, with the RedHawks losing to visiting Edmonton, 6–3, in front of 14,066 fans—the third-largest crowd for an Oklahoma City home opener behind 14,801 in 1992 and 14,488 in 1987. The ballpark's four-game opening weekend attracted the most fans ever for a four-game baseball series in Oklahoma. A total of 42,851 people attended the four games for an average of 10,713 per game, which paced minor league baseball that weekend.
- The RedHawks recorded their first win at the ballpark April 17, 1998, defeating Edmonton, 8–2.
- On July 10, 2002, a crowd of 11,343 watched the Pacific Coast League shut out the International League, 5–0, in the 15th Triple-A All-Star Game. Oklahoma's Aaron Myette was selected as the Pitcher of the Game.
- Luis Mendoza pitched the team's first nine-inning no-hitter August 14, 2009, against the Salt Lake Bees at Bricktown Ballpark. He threw 125 pitches, including 74 for strikes. He walked six and struck out six batters in the 5–0 win.
- From 2006 to 2010, the park hosted the Triple-A Baseball National Championship Game, originally called the Bricktown Showdown (2006–2008). The single-game playoff between the champions of the International and Pacific Coast Leagues effectively served as a winner-take-all World Series style game between the two Triple-A leagues. The first one was played on September 19, 2006, when the Tucson Sidewinders defeated the Toledo Mud Hens, 5–2, before a crowd of 12,572.
- Two exhibition games between the St. Louis Cardinals and Baltimore Orioles were played there in 2005, while the Chicago White Sox and Texas Rangers played a single pre-season game at Bricktown in 2008. The RedHawks faced the parent Houston Astros in a 2011 exhibition in Bricktown.
- The RedHawks set the team record for most runs scored in a game at Chickasaw Bricktown Ballpark and tied the club record for most runs scored in a game overall in a 24–5 win against Colorado Springs on August 3, 2013.
- The RedHawks won 17 consecutive home games July 26 – August 20, 2013, for the longest home winning streak in team history at Chickasaw Bricktown Ballpark.
- The longest game at Chickasaw Bricktown Ballpark occurred on September 1, 2015, when Oklahoma City and the Iowa Cubs played a 19-inning game that lasted 5 hours, 44 minutes. Buck Britton's two-run walk-off homer gave the team a 6–4 win in what was the first game of a doubleheader. OKC went on to win the second game, 3–1, as the teams combined to play 25.5 innings over 7 hours, 31 minutes.
- OKC starting pitcher Wilmer Font racked up a team-record 15 strikeouts on May 15, 2017, against Sacramento at Chickasaw Bricktown Ballpark and went on to be named the PCL Pitcher of the Year.
- OKC recorded back-to-back-to-back home runs for the first time in modern team history June 9, 2017, against the Round Rock Express in Oklahoma City. With one out in the first inning, Joc Pederson, Scott Van Slyke and Willie Calhoun each homered within a span of five pitches.
- The third-largest crowd in Chickasaw Bricktown Ballpark history was on hand to watch a rehab appearance by Los Angeles Dodgers pitcher Clayton Kershaw August 26, 2017, against the Omaha Storm Chasers. A standing-room-only crowd of 13,106 was the largest in OKC since April 18, 1998 – the third game ever played at Chickasaw Bricktown Ballpark.

== History of ballparks in Oklahoma City ==
Amateur teams started playing on makeshift fields shortly after the state's Land Run in 1889 in a centrally located site near where Bricktown sits today. In fact, Chickasaw Bricktown Ballpark sits within a block of the original site.

The city's first ballpark structure was Colcord Field, located along the banks of the North Canadian River in 1904, which was home to Oklahoma City's first professional baseball team. The facility was also called Saratoga Park, Liberty Park and Western League Park before being destroyed by flooding in 1923.

Holland Field, located at NW 4 and Pennsylvania, was built in 1924 and later became Tribe Park in the early 1940s and Texas League Park in 1946.

All Sports Stadium opened in 1962 and was located at NW 10th Street and May at the state fairgrounds. The 89ers played there for 36 seasons.

Chickasaw Bricktown Ballpark celebrated its 20th season in 2017 at which numerous festivities were held throughout the season to mark this milestone, including a kickoff luncheon prior to the season featuring former OKC mayors and PCL President Branch B. Rickey. A commemorative brick display benefitting the OKC Dodgers Baseball Foundation was unveiled on the Mickey Mantle Plaza and fans were able to vote online throughout the season to select an All-Ballpark Team and determine the best players to step on the field at Chickasaw Bricktown Ballpark. Ceremonial first pitches took place throughout the season, players wore special 20th Season jerseys, new merchandise was introduced in the Team Store and a 20th Season Stein was given away to fans to help mark the special occasion.

== Transportation ==
The Chickasaw Bricktown Ballpark is served by the Oklahoma City Streetcar at Ballpark station.

Preceding station	EMBARK	Following station
East Bricktown One-way operation	Downtown Loop	Santa Fe Hub Next clockwise
East Bricktown One-way operation	Bricktown Loop	Santa Fe Hub Next clockwise

Events and tenants
Preceded by All Sports Stadium	Home of the Oklahoma City RedHawks; 1998 – present	Succeeded by current
