= Run of 1889 =

Sculpture in Oklahoma City, Oklahoma, U.S.

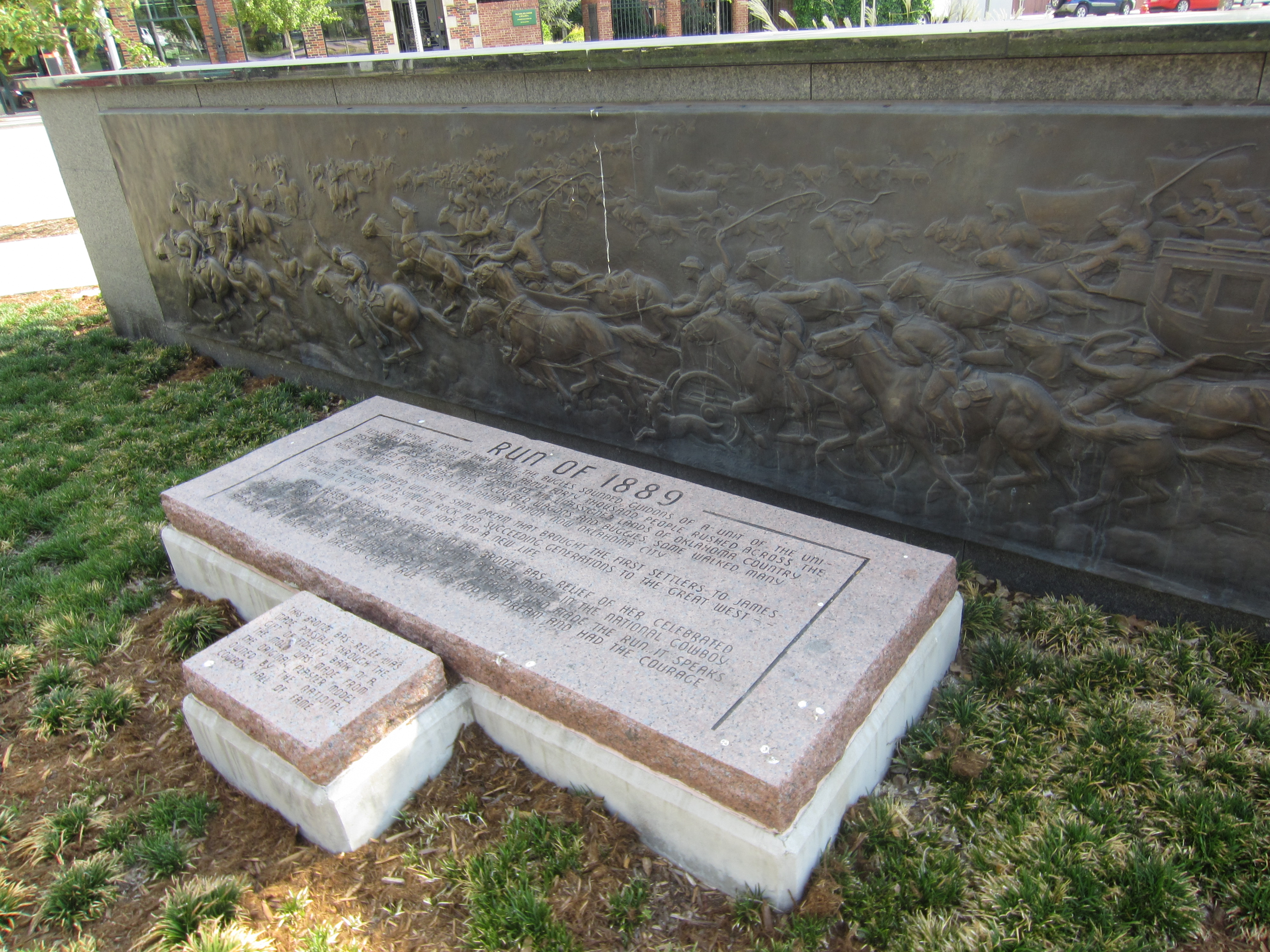
- Part of the relief in 2019
- Artist: Laura Gardin Fraser
- Year: 1955
- Dimensions: 6.4 m (21 ft)
- Location: Oklahoma City, Oklahoma U.S.
- 35.46870°N 97.52199°W

Run of 1889 is an outdoor 1955 relief by Laura Gardin Fraser, installed in Oklahoma City's Bicentennial Park, in the U.S. state of Oklahoma. The 21-foot (6.4 m) sculpture commemorates pioneers of the Land Rush of 1889 and depicts more than 250 horses and riders. It is part of the City of Oklahoma City Public Art collection and was renovated in 2012.

== See also ==
- 1955 in art
- Horses in art
