= Statue of Stanley Draper =

Statue in Oklahoma City, Oklahoma, U.S.

- The statue in 2019
- Artist: Leonard McMurry
- Year: 1974
- Medium: Bronze sculpture
- Subject: Stanley Draper
- Location: Oklahoma City, Oklahoma, U.S.; 35.469080°N 97.520518°W

Stanley Draper is a 1974 bronze sculpture by Leonard McMurry, installed outside Oklahoma City's City Hall, in the U.S. state of Oklahoma.

== History ==
The statue was formerly installed in Bicentennial Park. It was surveyed by the Smithsonian Institution's "Save Outdoor Sculpture!" program in 1994. Circa 2013, the artwork was moved from the park to its current location on the east side of the City Hall.

== See also ==
- 1974 in art
