= Curious Organism =

Sculpture in Oklahoma City, Oklahoma, U.S.

- The sculpture in 2019
- Artist: Stan Carroll
- Year: 2009
- Medium: Steel sculpture
- Location: Oklahoma City, Oklahoma, U.S.
- 35.47°N 97.514234°W

Curious Organism is a 2009 steel sculpture by Stan Carroll, installed outside a parking garage at Robert S. Kerr and N. Broadway in Oklahoma City, in the U.S. state of Oklahoma. It resembles a bacterium surrounded by cilia, standing on four legs.

== See also ==
- 2009 in art
