= The Runners (sculpture) =

Sculpture in Oklahoma City, Oklahoma, U.S.

- The sculpture in 2019
- Artist: Rich Muno; Bruce L. Bockus
- Year: 1989
- Medium: Bronze sculpture
- Dimensions: 4.6 m × 2.4 m × 2.4 m (15 ft × 8 ft × 8 ft)
- Location: Oklahoma City, Oklahoma, U.S.
- 35.464031°N 97.514354°W

The Runners is an outdoor bronze sculpture depicting runners by artist Rich Muno and architect Bruce L. Bockus, installed in Oklahoma City, in the U.S. state of Oklahoma.

== Description ==
The bronze sculpture depicts one male and one female runner wearing shorts, tank tops, and tennis shoes. Both figures are carrying torches. The work measures approximately 15 x 8 x 8 ft, and rests on a polished 5-sided granite base that measures approximately 7 x 12 x 12 ft. There are plaques with inscriptions on each side of the base.

== History ==
Scissortail Bronze Works served as the founder, and NICO Industries was the contractor. The sculpture was completed in 1989 and dedicated on April 22, 1989. It was surveyed by the Smithsonian Institution's "Save Outdoor Sculpture!" program in 1996. The artwork is administered by the city's Parks and Recreation Department.

== See also ==
- 1989 in art
