= Air Force Monument =

Sculpture in Oklahoma City, Oklahoma, U.S.

- The monument's statue in 2019
- Year: 1964
- Location: Oklahoma City, Oklahoma, U.S.; 35.469272°N 97.514786°W

The Air Force Monument is an outdoor memorial and sculpture by Leonard McMurry, installed in Oklahoma City, in the U.S. state of Oklahoma.

== Description and history ==
The 12-foot (3.7 m) monument was completed in 1964, then restored in 2002 and rededicated in 2003. It depicts a man holding the United States Air Force seal and an eagle above his head. The memorial is dedicated "to the memory of those Oklahomans who have given their lives while serving their country as members of the United States Air Force and for the working men and women at Tinker Air Force Base, both military and civilian, who have and continue to give of themselves for the defense of the homeland we so dearly love".

== See also ==
- 1964 in art
