= Inclined (Phelps) =

Sculpture in Oklahoma City, Oklahoma, U.S.

- Artist: David Phelps
- Location: Oklahoma City, Oklahoma, U.S.
- 35°27′55″N 97°30′33.9″W

Inclined is a 2000 site-specific artwork by David Phelps, installed in Oklahoma City's Bricktown neighborhood of Oklahoma.

== Description ==
The sculpture is made of bronze, steel, and cement. The Oklahoman's Steve Lackmeyer said the artwork "features the upper half torso of a dark-skinned man, double life size, pushing a big concrete sphere up a pair of rails", and has a title with multiple meanings, a characteristic "representative of Phelps' work". Health care consultant Curtis Thomas served as a model for the piece.

== Reception ==
According to The Oklahoman, "Early on, critics questioned whether a sculpture portraying the upper torso of a dark-skinned man pushing a giant sphere up a pair of rails was appropriate for the thriving entertainment district." Multiple members of the Metropolitan Area Projects Citizens Oversight Board's Construction Review Committee felt the sculpture "over-emphasized the civil rights struggle and ignored other historical aspects of Bricktown".

== See also ==
- 2000 in art
