= The Conductor (sculpture) =

Sculpture in Oklahoma City, Oklahoma, U.S.

- Maestro
- The statue in 2019
- Artist: Mike Larsen
- Year: 2007
- Medium: Bronze sculpture
- Subject: Conductor
- Location: Oklahoma City, Oklahoma, U.S.
- 35.469168°N 97.522814°W

The Conductor, also known as Maestro, is a bronze sculpture of a conductor by Mike Larsen, installed in Oklahoma City's Bicentennial Park, outside Civic Center Music Hall, in the U.S. state of Oklahoma.

== Description and history ==
The 9-foot (2.7 m) statue depicts a man conducting and commemorates Joel Levine, music director of the Oklahoma City Philharmonic, as well as six music directors of other local orchestras: Ralph Rose, Victor Alessandro, Guy Fraser Harrison, Ray Luke, Ainslee Cox, and Luis Herrera de la Fuente.

The artwork, unveiled in 2007, was funded by Jeannette and Dick Sias, with additional support from the city and the Oklahoma City Centennial Committee. Mayor Mick Cornett attended the dedication ceremony.

== See also ==
- 2007 in art
