= And Jesus Wept =

Sculpture in Oklahoma City, Oklahoma, U.S.

- The statue in 2019
- Location: Oklahoma City, Oklahoma, U.S.
- 35.472850°N 97.518000°W

And Jesus Wept is an outdoor sculpture located across from the Oklahoma City National Memorial in Oklahoma City, Oklahoma, U.S. state. Erected by Saint Joseph Catholic Church, the statue stands on the site of the church's Parish House, which was severely damaged and later demolished during the Oklahoma City bombing.

The sculpture portrays Jesus facing away from the devastation, his face covered by his hand in a gesture of disappointment. The 168 gaps in the wall symbolize the void left by the lives lost in the bombing.
