= Civic Center Music Hall =

Performing arts center in Oklahoma, US

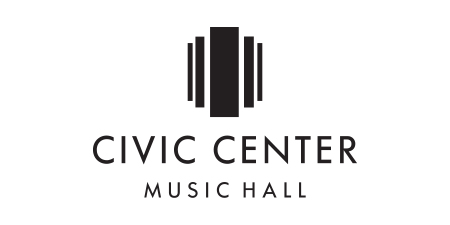
- Interactive map of Civic Center Music Hall
- Address: 201 North Walker Ave. Oklahoma City, Oklahoma; United States
- Coordinates: 35.469041°N 97.523361°W
- Capacity: Thelma Gaylord Performing Arts Theatre: 2,477; Little Theatre: 286; CitySpace Theatre: 100
- Type: Performing arts center

Construction
- Opened: October 4, 1937
- Architect: Hawk & Parr

Website
- www.okcciviccenter.com
- Municipal Auditorium
- U.S. National Register of Historic Places
- Location within Oklahoma Location within the United States
- Area: 6 acres (2.4 ha)
- NRHP reference No.: 16000850
- Added to NRHP: December 13, 2016

The Civic Center Music Hall is a performing arts center located in Oklahoma City, Oklahoma. It was constructed in 1937 as Municipal Auditorium and renamed in 1966. The facility includes the Thelma Gaylord Performing Arts Theatre, the Freede Little Theatre, CitySpace, the Meinders Hall of Mirrors and the Joel Levine Rehearsal Hall.

The Civic Center Music Hall is managed and operated in conjunction with the Rose State Performing Arts Theatre. Together they serve more than 300,000 patrons at around 250 performances at four different stages each year. The center is home to seven professional arts organizations: Canterbury Voices, OKC Broadway, Lyric Theatre of Oklahoma, Oklahoma City Ballet, Oklahoma City Philharmonic, Oklahoma City Rep, and Painted Sky Opera.

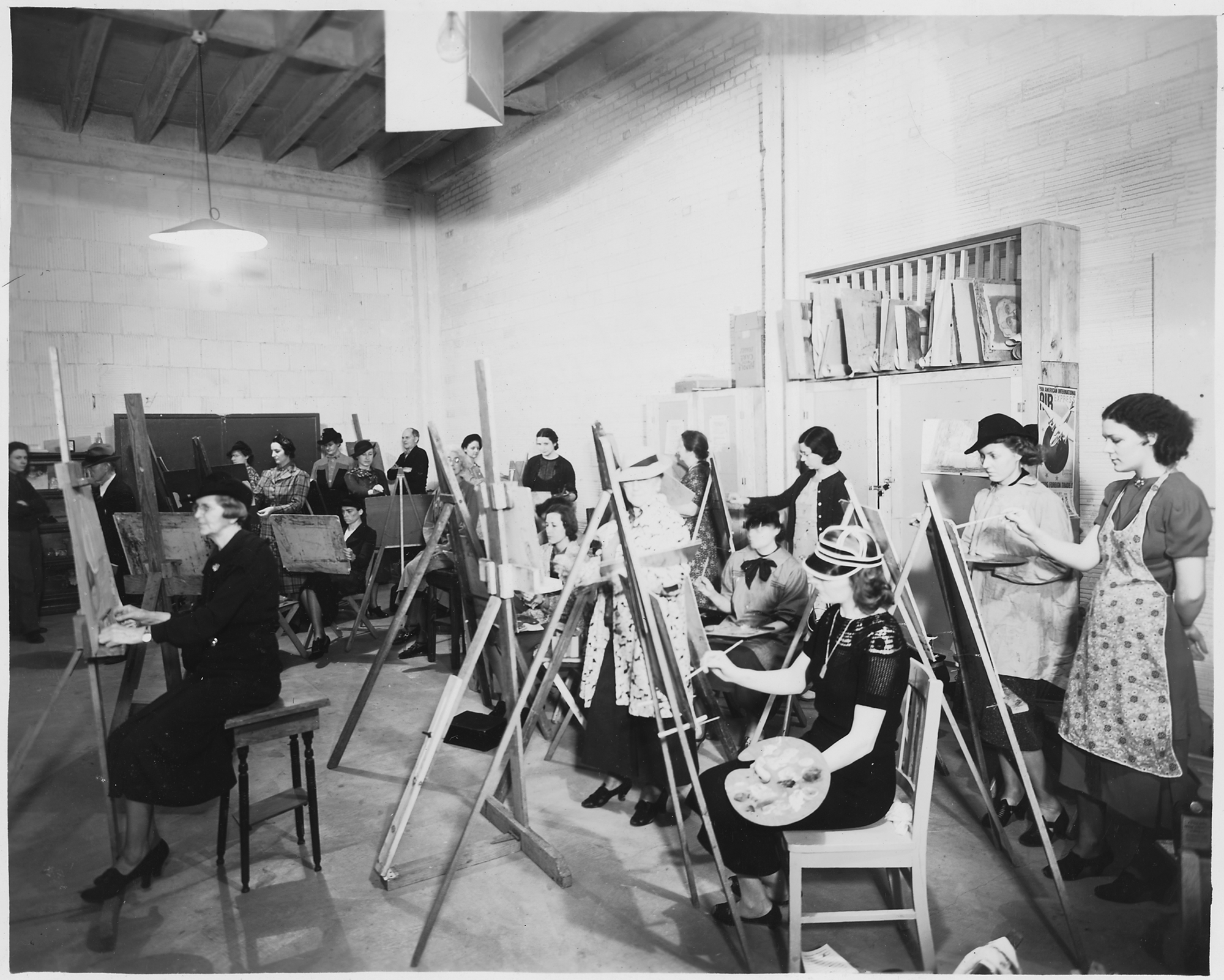
One of the community art centers created by the WPA Federal Art Project, the Oklahoma Art Center was located in Municipal Auditorium (1941)

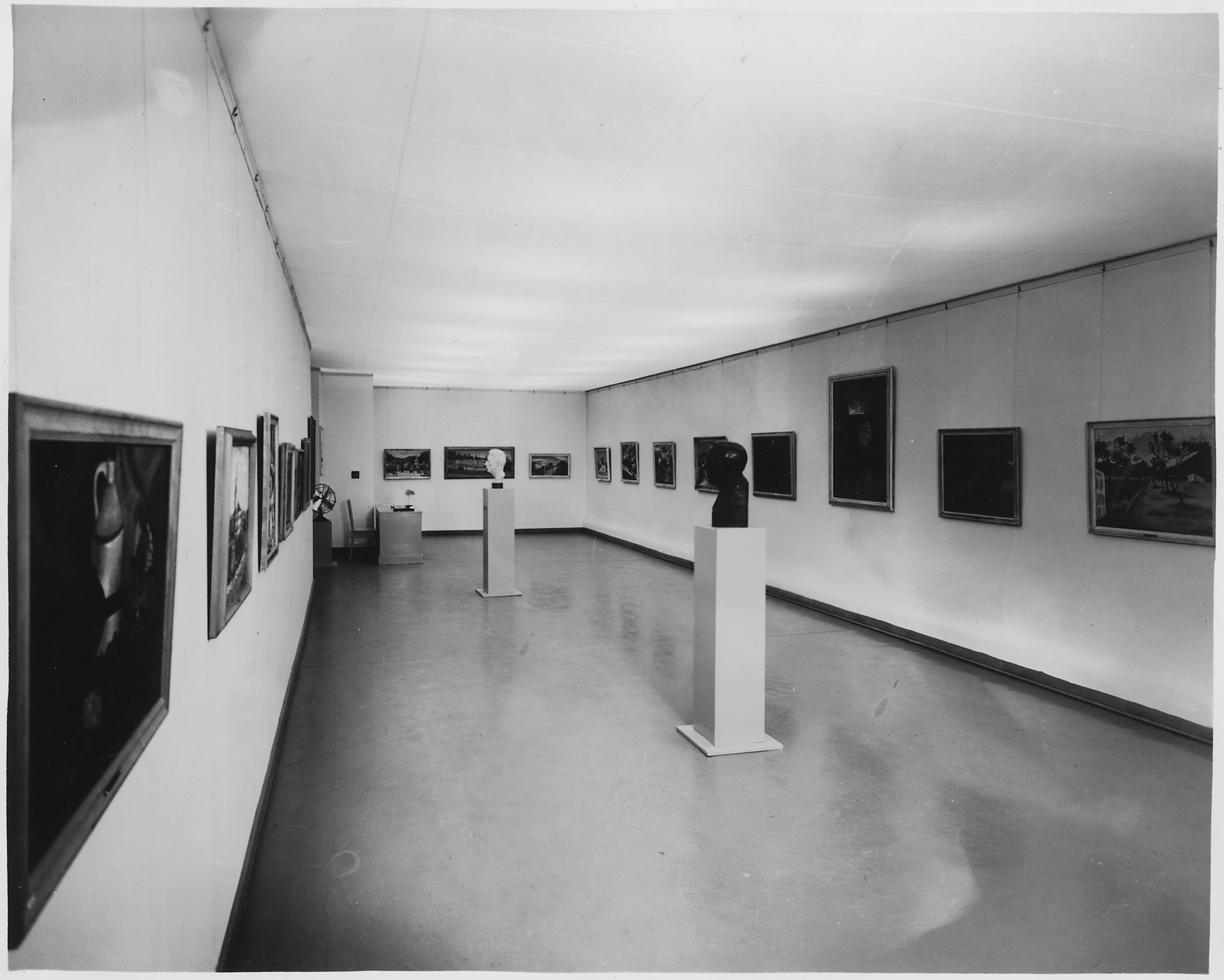
Exhibit at the Federal Gallery in the Oklahoma Art Center (1941)

== History ==
In 1927, the Oklahoma City Chamber of Commerce and the city jointly purchased the land that would become home to a municipal auditorium after voters approved a $4 million bond for the site. President Franklin D. Roosevelt's New Deal programs in the 1930s contributed 55 percent of the cost of building through the Public Works Administration. J. O. Parr began planning and designing the Municipal Auditorium, budgeted at $1.25 million. The original design features a six-story building with both neoclassical and Art Deco features that seated 6,200 in the main hall and smaller theatre that seated 400.[citation needed]

In August 1935, the Roosevelt Administration announced that all PWA projects had to break ground by December 1935 or risk losing federal support. W. S. Bellows Construction became the primary contractor and began on-site excavation on time. The Municipal Auditorium was completed in April 1937. The first performance, "Rhapsodic Rhythms" took place on October 4, 1937.

The Oklahoma Art Center, a community art center administered by the Federal Art Project, was located in Municipal Auditorium. Fundraising campaigns began for the successful organization as the Federal Art Project came to an end, and in May 1945 the Oklahoma Art Center was incorporated. In 1989 it was merged into the Oklahoma City Museum of Art.

In 1966, the Municipal Auditorium was remodeled and renamed the Civic Center Music Hall. The main auditorium was renovated to cater more to the performing arts by decreasing the size of the hall, moving the side wall in and installing mahogany panels, lowering the ceiling and replacing the portable floor with a sloped fixed floor. In 1971, the basement was converted into office space and later converted back to the theatre space and dressing rooms. One of the biggest concerts to ever play the venue was Kiss on their 1976 Alive! tour. The band's opening act did not make it to the building forcing the management to find a new opening act on the day of the show. The band that was called to fill in was referred by the then assistant technical director Richard Charnay (who would put in a 40+ year career at the music hall). The band was called Mountain Smoke which featured an unknown artist by the name of Vince Gill.

The Little Theatre was closed in 1985 because it was damaged from old age, abuse, and a fire. It was later renovated and reopened to the public.

In September 2001, the Civic Center Music Hall reopened after a three-year renovation. A complete interior renovation of the historic Civic Center Music Hall includes accommodations for major theatrical, dance and musical groups; a multi-story atrium; balconies, box seats and suites; excellent acoustics; and a hydraulic orchestra pit.

The building was listed on the National Register of Historic Places in 2016.

In 2018, the Civic Center Foundation assumed full management of the Civic Center Music Hall and Rose State College Performing Arts Theatre from the City of Oklahoma City.

== Foundation and volunteer organizations ==
The Civic Center Foundation, established in 2001, is a private non-profit organization that supports the Civic Center Music Hall financially to help bring performing arts to Oklahoma City to improve the community.

The Civic Center Foundation has helped make capital improvements including the Civic Center Music Hall's new message center and improvements to the Freede Little Theatre.

The Foundation raises funds through two programs, the Seat Back Campaign and the Suite Holder Program. Patrons can help the Civic Center Music Hall by purchasing personalized seat back plates at the Thelma Gaylord Performing Arts Theatre or by becoming a suite or box holder at the Civic Center Music Hall.

The Civic Center Music Hall is also home to STARS, a volunteer group of more than 300 people who contribute thousands of hours each year.

== See also ==
- National Register of Historic Places listings in Oklahoma County, Oklahoma
- The Conductor (sculpture), installed outside the hall
