= Investigation, Analysis and Publication =

Sculpture in Oklahoma City, Oklahoma, U.S.

- The sculpture in 2019
- Location: Oklahoma City, Oklahoma, U.S.
- 35.467550°N 97.516211°W

Investigation, Analysis and Publication is an outdoor sculpture installed at the corner of Robinson Avenue and Main Street in Oklahoma City, in the U.S. state of Oklahoma. The statues were commissioned by E.K. Gaylord in 1964. They were originally hung displayed on the south side of The Daily Oklahoman building (25 NW 4), and were relocated when the company moved to 9000 N Broadway in 1991.
