= Oklahoma's Native Son =

Sculpture in Oklahoma City, Oklahoma, U.S.

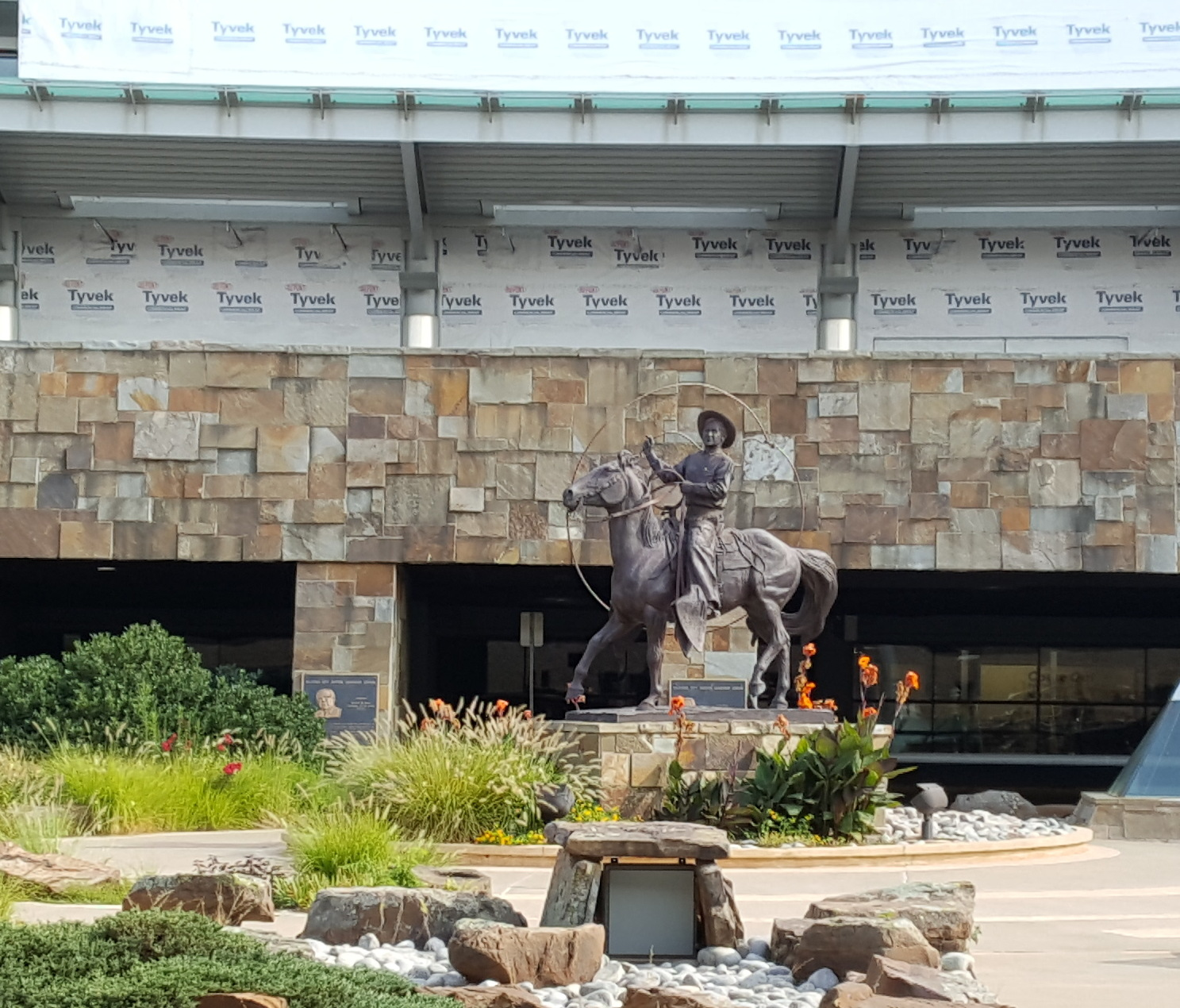
- The statue outside the Will Rogers World Airport in 2019
- Artist: Harold T. Holden
- Year: 2005
- Location: Oklahoma City, Oklahoma, U.S.
- 35.395814°N 97.596097°W

Oklahoma's Native Son is a 2005 bronze sculpture of Will Rogers by Harold T. Holden, installed outside the Will Rogers World Airport in Oklahoma City, in the U.S. state of Oklahoma. Commissioned by the Oklahoma City Airport Trust to commemorate the completion of the airport's terminal renovation project, the artwork depicts Rogers astride his horse Teddy and weighs 2,500 lbs.

== See also ==
- 2005 in art
