= Statue of Johnny Bench =

Statue in Oklahoma City, Oklahoma, U.S.

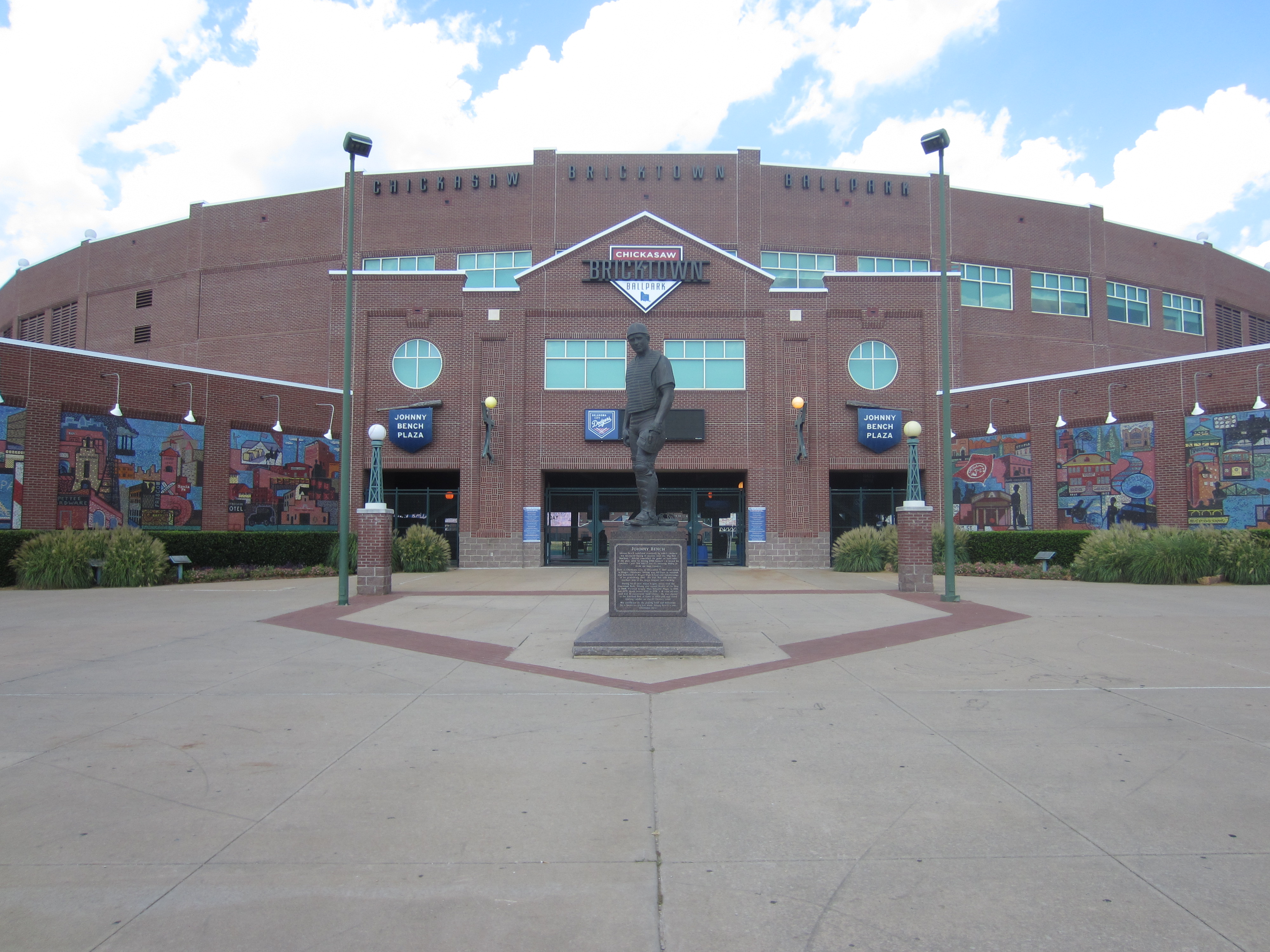
- The statue outside Chickasaw Bricktown Ballpark in 2019
- Artist: Paul Moore
- Year: 2001
- Subject: Johnny Bench
- Location: Oklahoma City, Oklahoma, U.S.; 35.464492°N 97.508892°W
- Owner: City of Oklahoma City Public Art

The statue of former professional baseball catcher Johnny Bench by Paul Moore is installed outside Oklahoma City's Chickasaw Bricktown Ballpark, in the U.S. state of Oklahoma. The bronze sculpture was unveiled in 2001. The work is part of the City of Oklahoma City Public Art collection.

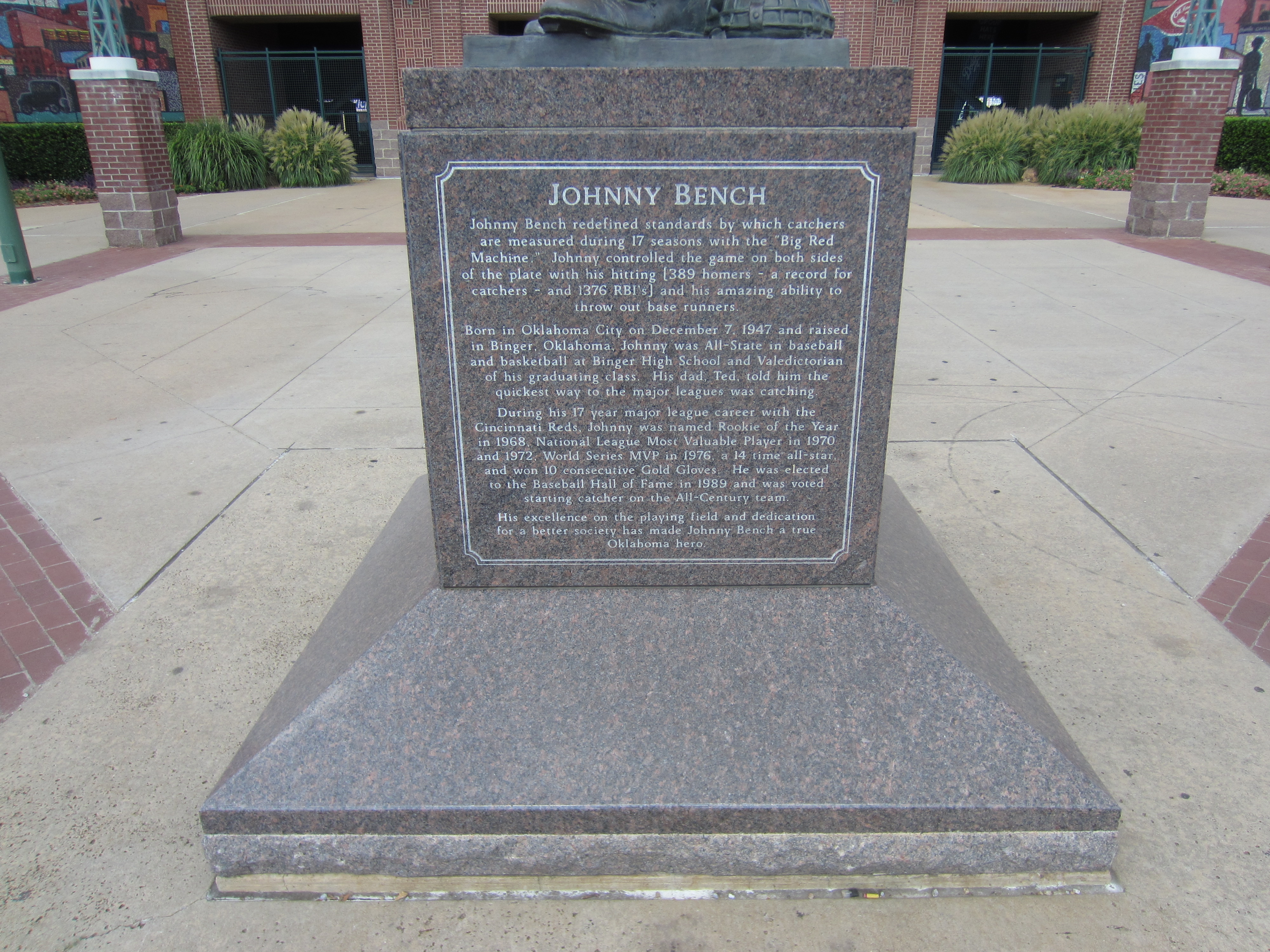
Inscription, 2019

== See also ==
- 2001 in art
