= As Long as the Waters Flow =

Sculpture in Oklahoma City, Oklahoma, U.S.

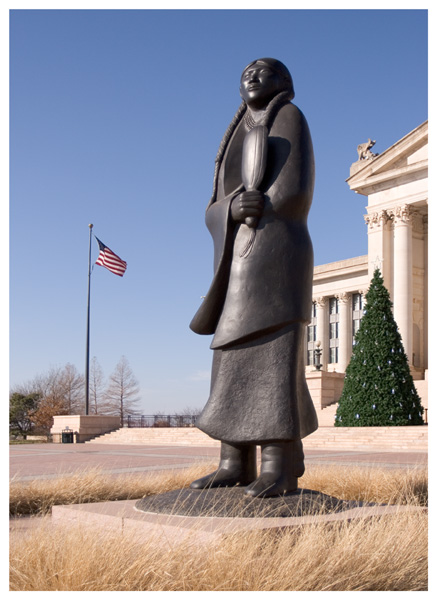
- The statue on Christmas in 2010
- Artist: Allan Houser
- Year: 1989
- Medium: Bronze sculpture
- Location: Oklahoma City, Oklahoma, U.S.
- 35.491412°N 97.503110°W

As Long as the Waters Flow is a 1989 bronze sculpture by Allan Houser, installed outside the Oklahoma State Capitol in Oklahoma City, in the U.S. state of Oklahoma. The statue, which depicts a Native American woman, was dedicated in 1989.

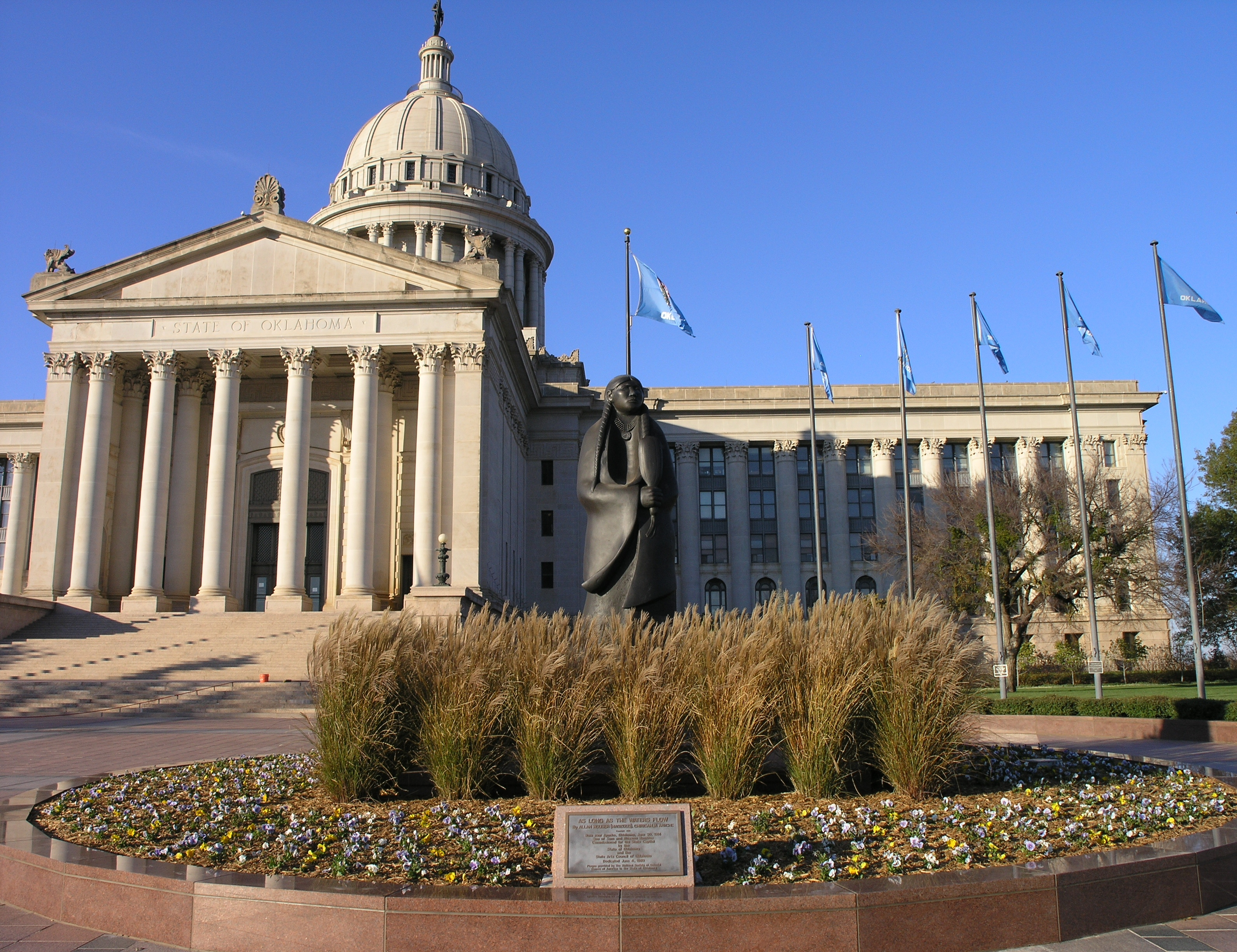
The statue in 2006

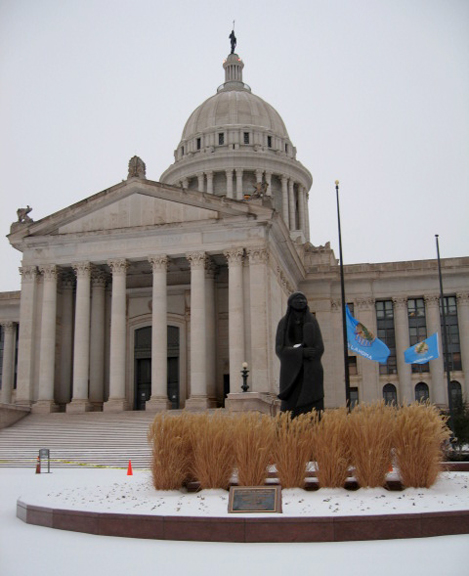
Enoch Kelly Haney's Guardian is on top of the dome, while Allan Houser's Guardian is in front of the Capitol

== See also ==
- 1989 in art
