= Bicentennial Monument =

Series of granite tablets in Oklahoma City, Oklahoma, U.S.

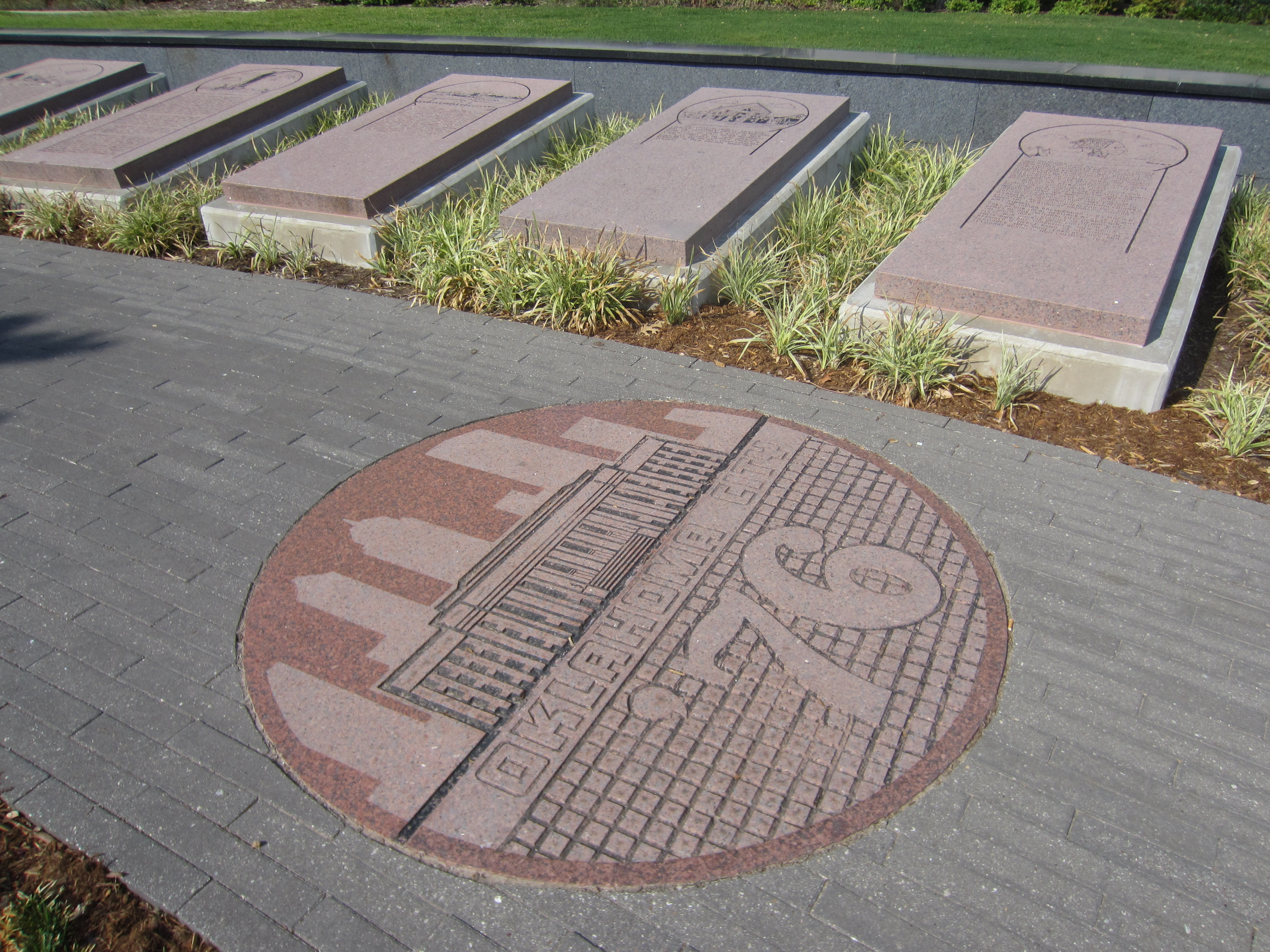
- Some of the granite tablets in 2019
- Interactive map of Bicentennial Monument
- Location: Bicentennial Park, Oklahoma City, Oklahoma, U.S.
- Coordinates: 35°28′7.4″N 97°31′19.1″W
- Type: Monument
- Material: Granite
- Opening date: 1930
- Dedicated date: 1976
- Restored date: 2012

The Bicentennial Monument is a series of granite tablets describing the history of Oklahoma City, installed in the city's Bicentennial Park, in the U.S. state of Oklahoma. The tablets were created c. 1930, rededicated in 1976, and renovated in 2012. The monument is part of the City of Oklahoma City Public Art collection.
