= Pioneers of 1889 =

Sculpture in Oklahoma City, Oklahoma, U.S.

- 1889
- The sculpture in 2019
- Artist: Leonard McMurry
- Year: 1959
- Medium: Bronze sculpture
- Location: Oklahoma City, Oklahoma, U.S.
- 35.469347°N 97.516206°W

Pioneers of 1889, or simply 1889, is an outdoor bronze sculpture by artist Leonard McMurry and landscape architect Thomas Roberts, installed in Oklahoma City, in the U.S. state of Oklahoma.

== Description and history ==
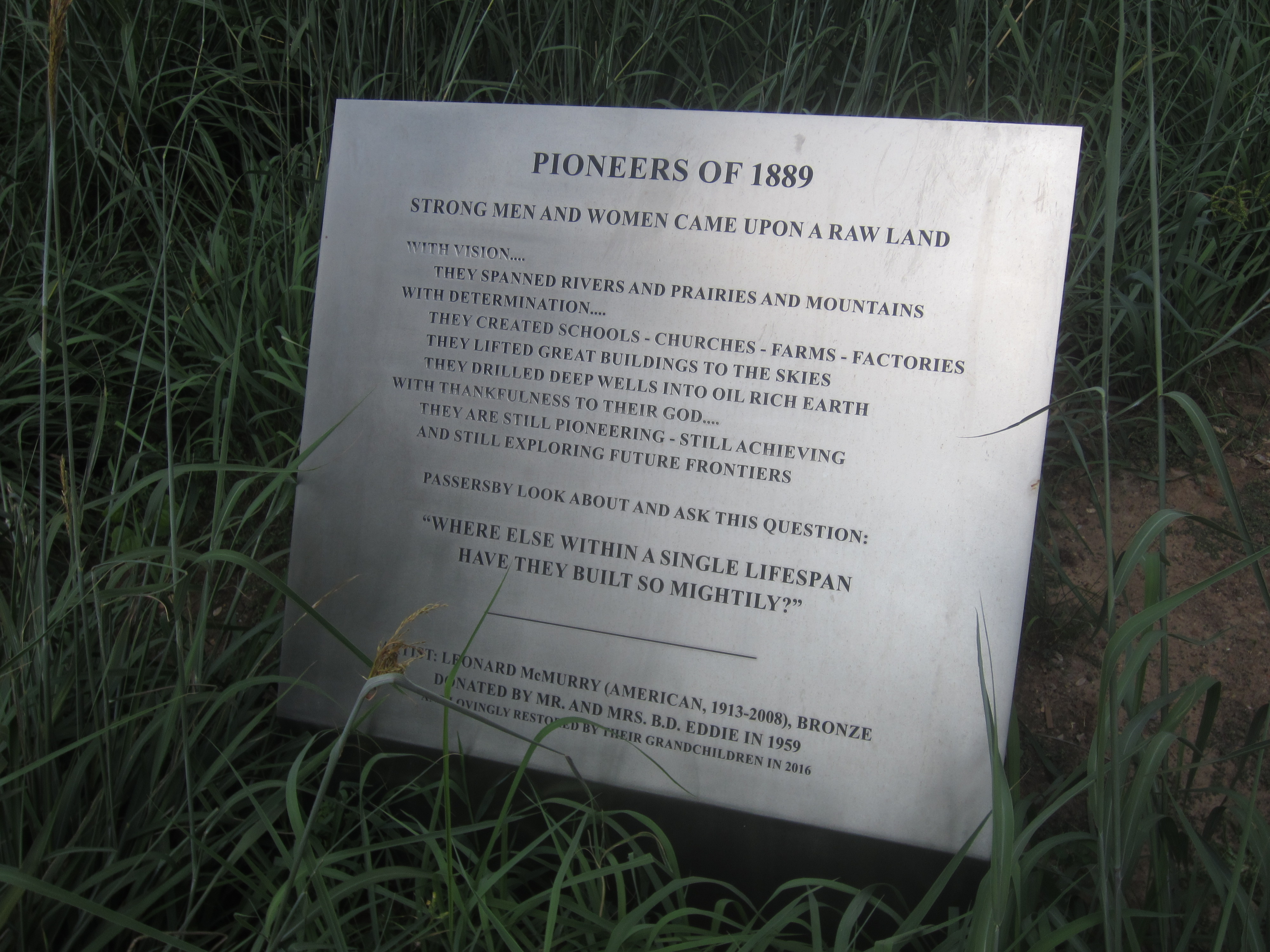
Plaque for the sculpture, 2019

The artwork was copyrighted on February 25, 1957, completed in 1959, and dedicated on April 22, 1960. The sculpture depicts two settlers, including a young boy on a horse and a man. It measures approximately 9 ft. 5 in. x 5 ft. 9 in. x 10 ft. 6 in. and rests on a polished granite base measuring approximately 7 ft. 3 in. x 6 ft. 9 in. x 10 ft. 6 in.

A plaque on the west side of the base reads: "STRONG MEN AND WOMEN CAME UPON A RAW LAND / WITH VISION... / THEY SPANNED RIVERS AND PRAIRIES AND MOUNTAINS/WITH DETERMINATION... / THEY CREATED SCHOOLS-CHURCHES-FARMS-FACTORIES / THEY LIFTED GREAT BUILDINGS TO THE SKIES / THEY DRILLED DEEP WELLS INTO OIL RICH EARTH / WITH THANKFULNESS TO THEIR GOD... / THEY ARE STILL PIONEERING-STILL ACHIEVING / AND STILL EXPLORING FUTURE FRONTIERS / PASSERBY-LOOK ABOUT AND ASK THIS QUESTION / WHERE ELSE WITHIN A SINGLE LIFE SPAN / HAS MAN BUILT SO MIGHTLY / M.G.T." Another plaque on the base reads: "THIS STATUE COMMEMORATES THE PIONEERS OF 1889 / PRESENTED TO THE '89ERS AND THE PEOPLE OF OKLAHOMA / BY / MR. AND MRS. B.D. EDDIE / APRIL 22, 1960 / LEONARD MCMURRY / SCULPTOR."

== See also ==
- 1959 in art
