= Statue of Warren Spahn =

Statue in Oklahoma City, Oklahoma, U.S.

- Subject: Warren Spahn
- Location: Oklahoma City, Oklahoma, U.S.; 35.464621°N 97.506764°W

A statue of baseball pitching star and Hall of Famer Warren Spahn is installed outside Oklahoma City's Chickasaw Bricktown Ballpark, in the U.S. state of Oklahoma.
