= Oklahoma City National Memorial =

Memorial in Oklahoma City, Oklahoma

- Oklahoma City National Memorial & Museum
- U.S. National Register of Historic Places
- U.S. National Memorial
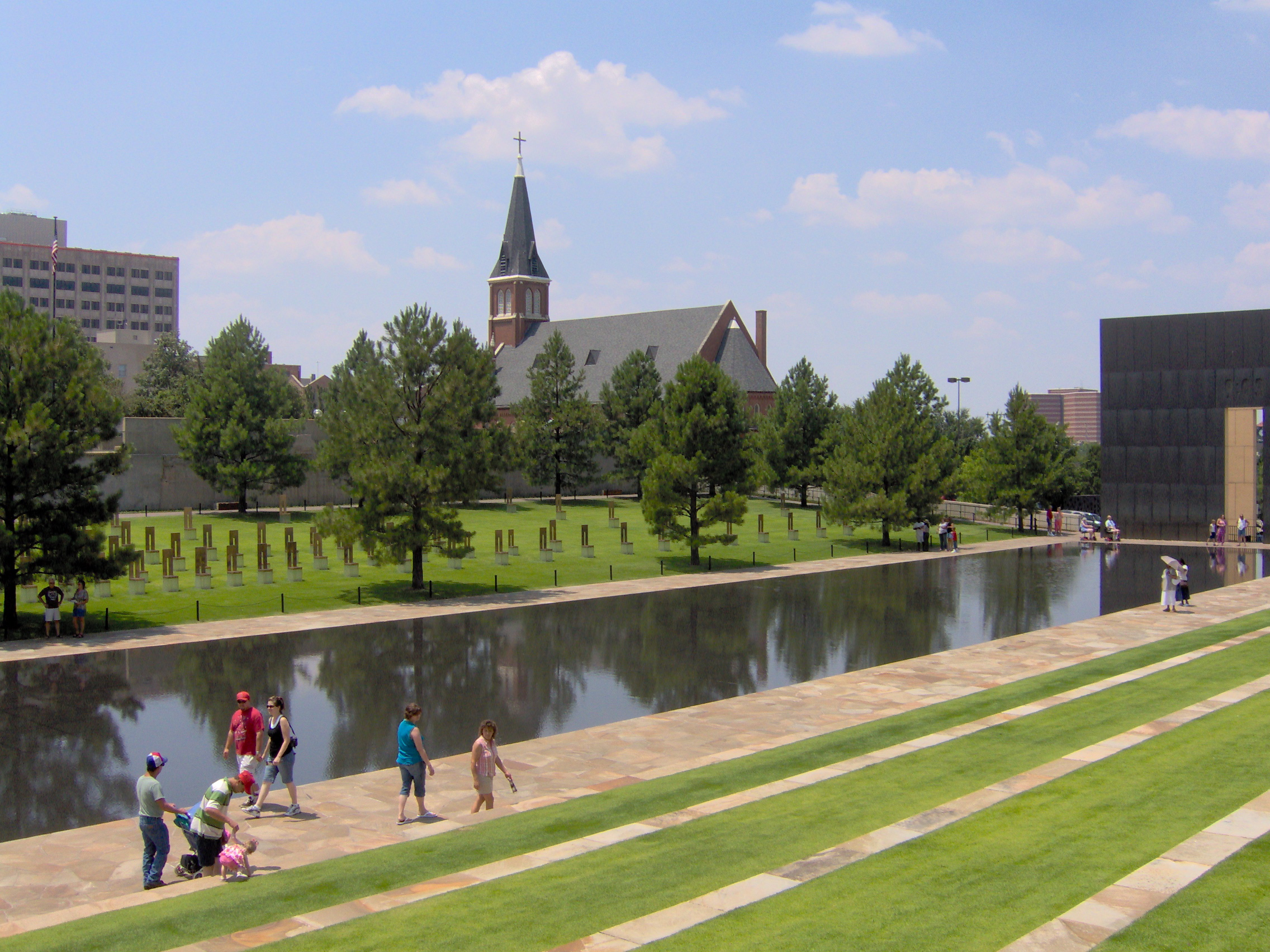
- Oklahoma City National Memorial pictured in 2006

- Location within Oklahoma Location within the United States
- Location: 620 North Harvey Avenue; Oklahoma City, Oklahoma; 73102
- Coordinates: 35°28′22″N 97°31′2″W
- Area: 3.3 acres (1.3 ha); 3.12 acres (1.26 ha) federal
- Built: 1997–2001
- Website: Oklahoma City National Memorial & Museum
- NRHP reference No.: 01000278
- Added to NRHP: October 9, 1997

The Oklahoma City National Memorial is a memorial site in Oklahoma City, Oklahoma, United States, that honors the victims, survivors, rescuers, and all who were affected by the Oklahoma City bombing on April 19, 1995. It is situated on the former site of the Alfred P. Murrah Federal Building, which was damaged in the bombing and was soon after torn down to make way for the memorial. The building was located on NW 5th Street between N. Robinson Avenue and N. Harvey Avenue.

The national memorial was authorized on October 9, 1997, by President Bill Clinton's signing of the Oklahoma City National Memorial Act of 1997. It was administratively listed on the National Register of Historic Places the same day. The memorial is administered by Oklahoma City National Memorial Foundation, with National Park Service staff to help interpret the memorial for visitors.

The memorial was formally dedicated on April 19, 2000, the fifth anniversary of the bombing. The museum was dedicated and opened 10 months later on February 19, 2001.

== History ==
On April 19, 1995, Timothy McVeigh parked a Ryder rental truck filled with explosives in front of the Alfred P. Murrah Federal Building and exploded it. A total of 168 people were killed, including many children, and the entire north face of the building was destroyed.

Months after the attack, Mayor Ron Norick appointed a task force to look into the creation of a permanent memorial where the Murrah building once stood. The Task Force called for 'a symbolic outdoor memorial', a Memorial Museum, and for the creation of the Oklahoma City National Memorial Institute for the Prevention of Terrorism. Six hundred and twenty four designs were submitted for the memorial. In July 1997 a design by Butzer Design Partnership, consisting of husband and wife Hans and Torrey Butzer, was chosen.

In October 1997, President Bill Clinton signed law creating the Oklahoma City National Memorial to be operated by the Oklahoma City National Memorial Trust. The total cost of the memorial was $29.1 million ($55,140,783.18 in 2023): $10 million for the Outdoor Symbolic Memorial, $7 million for the Memorial Museum, $5 million for the Memorial Institute for the Prevention of Terrorism and the rest for other costs. The federal government appropriated $5 million for construction with the state of Oklahoma matching that amount. More than $17 million in private donations was raised.

On April 19, 2000, the fifth anniversary of the attack, the Outdoor Symbolic Memorial was dedicated. On February 19, 2001, the Memorial Museum was dedicated. In 2004 it was transferred from the trust, to the Oklahoma City National Memorial Foundation, designating it an affiliated area of the National Park System. The Oklahoma City National Memorial since its opening has seen over 4.4 million visitors to the Outdoor Symbolic Memorial and 1.6 million visitors to the Memorial Museum. The Memorial has an average of 350,000 visitors per year.

== Memorial features ==
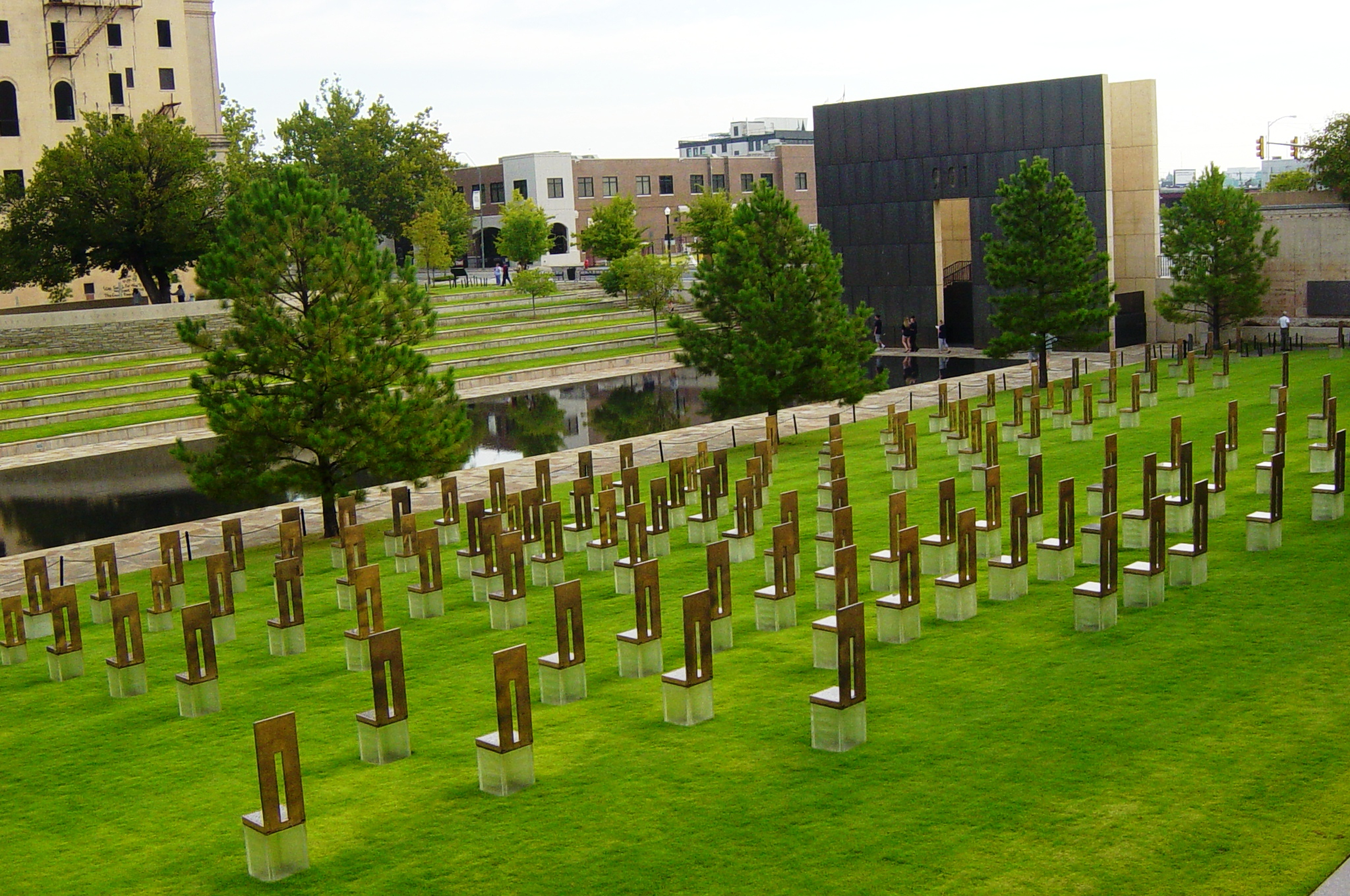
The Field of Empty Chairs, east Gate of Time, and Reflecting Pool at the Oklahoma City National Memorial. The Survivor Tree is visible in the upper left corner.

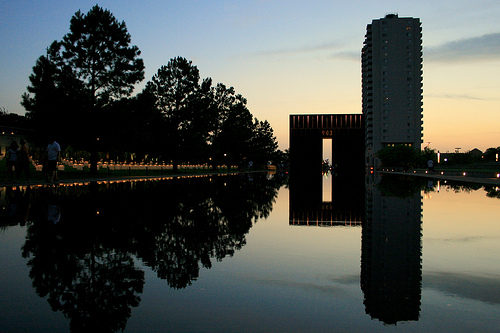
The Oklahoma City National Memorial as seen from the base of the reflecting pool

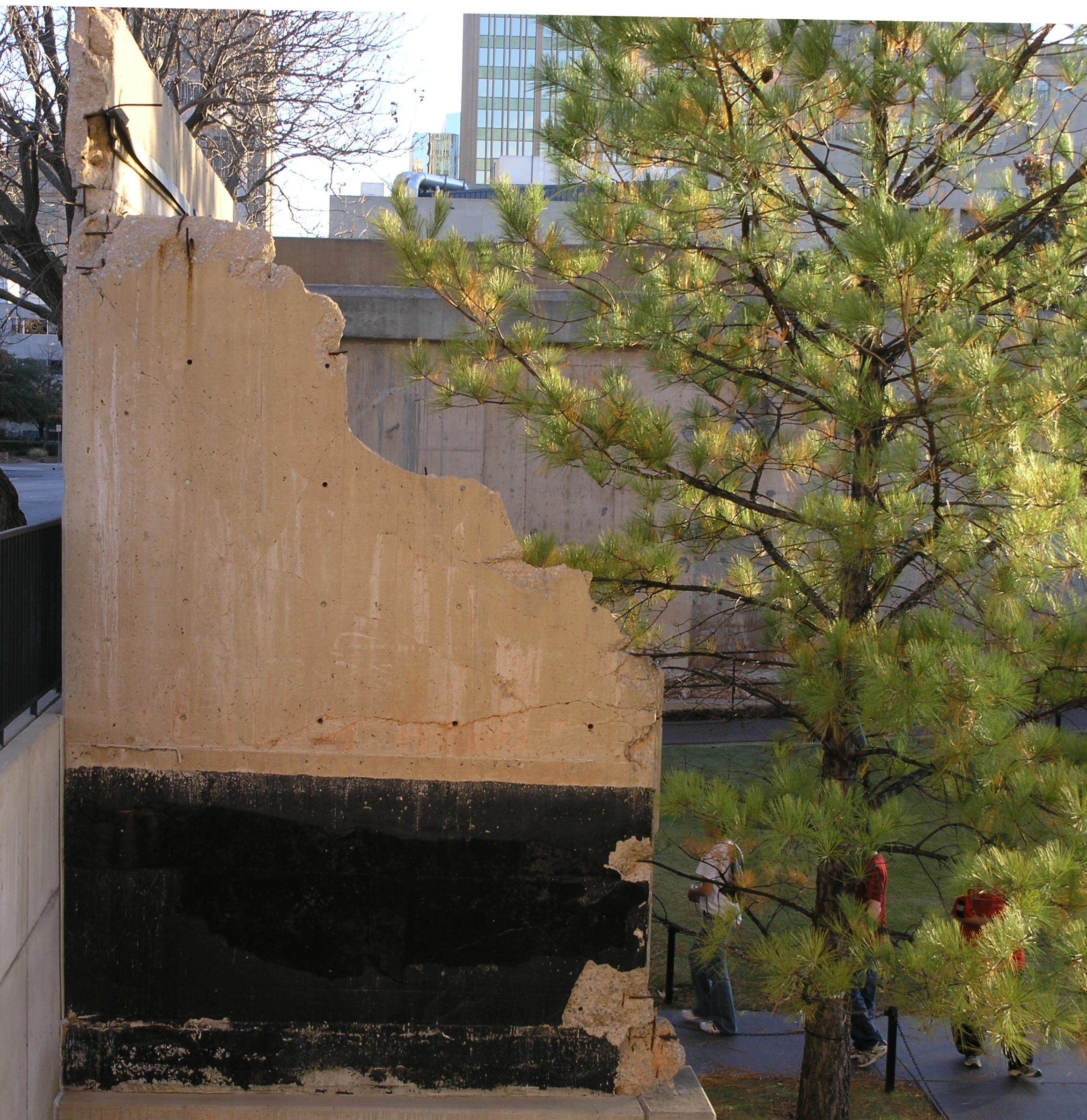
The Survivors' Wall is the only remaining part of the Murrah Building left standing, and forms part of the memorial complex.

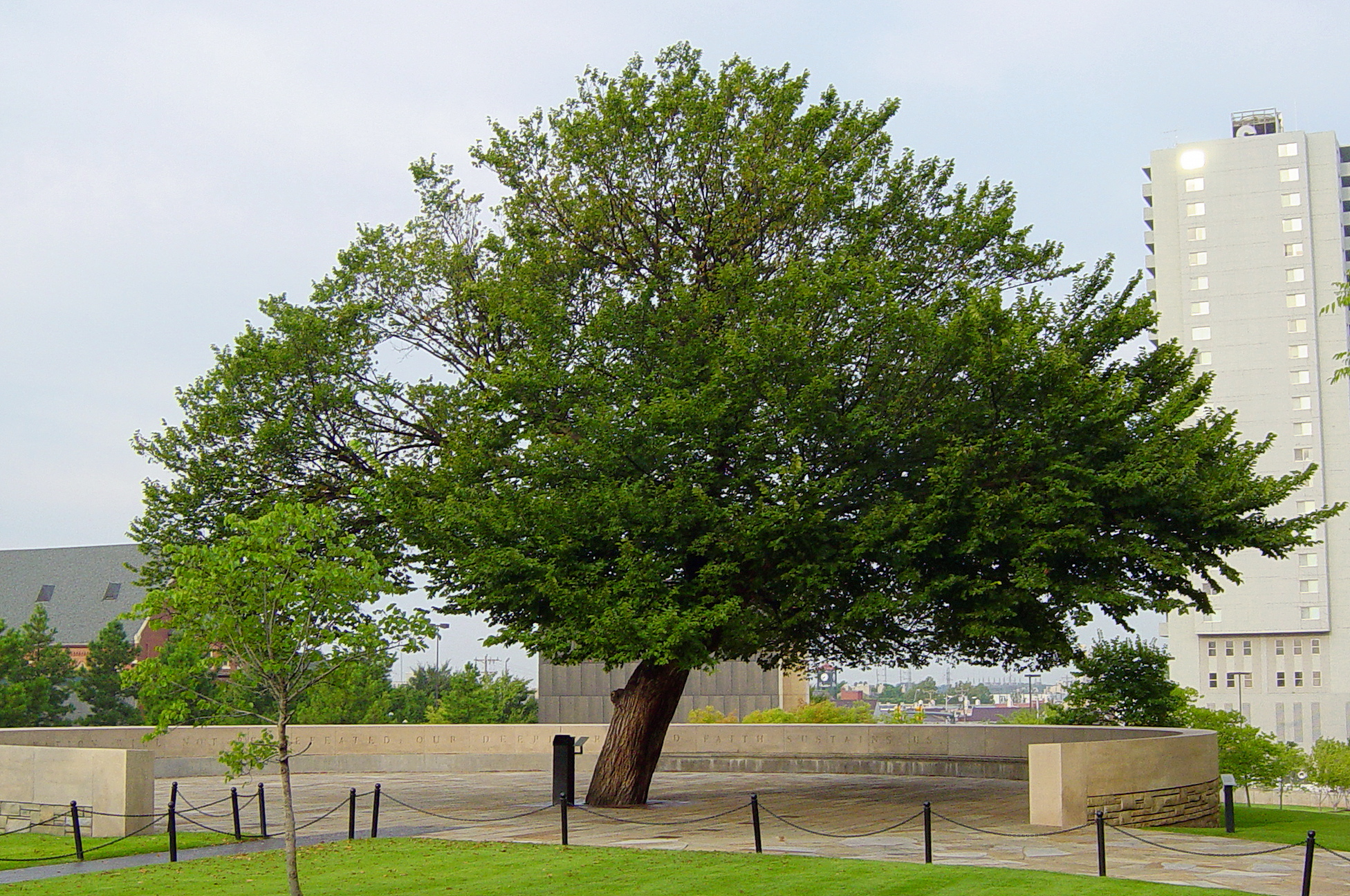
After surviving the bombing, the Survivor Tree became an emblem of the Memorial.

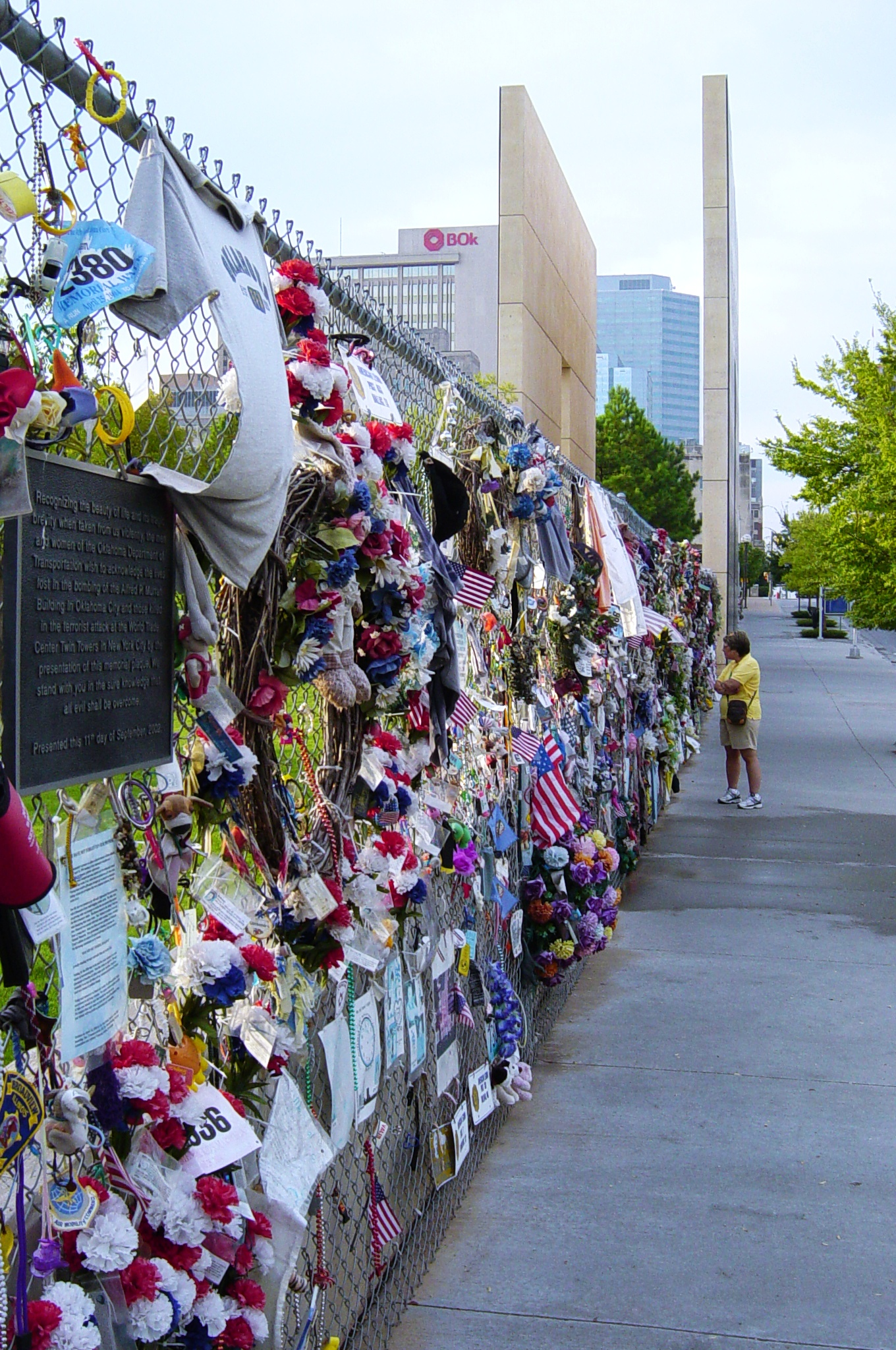
The Memorial Fence and east Gate of Time

The Outdoor Symbolic Memorial consists of the following segments on 3.3 acres (13,000 m^{2}) and is accessible day or night.

- The Gates of Time: monumental twin bronze gates frame the moment of destruction – 9:02 – and mark the formal entrances to the Outdoor Memorial. 9:01, found on the eastern gate, represents the last moments of peace, while its opposite on the western gate, 9:03, represents the first moments of recovery. Both time stamps are inscribed on the interior of the monument, facing each other and the Reflecting Pool.

The outside of each gate bears this inscription:

We come here to remember Those who were killed, those who survived and those who changed forever. May all who leave here know the impact of violence. May this memorial offer comfort, strength, peace, hope and serenity.

- Reflecting Pool: a thin layer of water flows over polished black granite to form the pool, which runs east to west down the center of the Memorial (also see reflecting pool) on what was once Fifth Street. Although the pool is flowing, visitors are able to see a mirror image of themselves in the water. Visitors seeing their reflections are said to be seeing "someone changed forever by what happened here."
- Field of Empty Chairs: one hundred and sixty-eight empty chairs hand-crafted from glass, bronze, and stone represent those who lost their lives, with a name etched in the glass base of each. They sit on the site where the Murrah Building once stood. The chairs are arranged in nine rows to symbolize the nine floors of the building; each person's chair is on the row (or the floor) on which the person worked or was located when the bomb went off. The chairs are also grouped according to the blast pattern, with the most chairs nearest the most heavily damaged portion of the building. The westernmost column of five chairs represents the five people who died but were not in the Murrah Building (two in the Water Resources Board building, one in the Athenian Building, one outside near the building, and one rescuer). The 19 smaller chairs represent the children killed in the bombing. Three unborn children died along with their mothers, and they are listed on their mothers' chairs beneath their mothers' names.
- Survivors' Wall: the only remaining original portions of the Murrah Building are the south and east walls, known as the Survivors' Wall. The wall has several panels of granite salvaged from the Murrah Building itself, inscribed with the names of more than 600 survivors from the building and the surrounding area, many of whom were injured in the blast.
- Survivor Tree: an American elm on the north side of the Memorial that was heavily damaged by the bomb, but survived. Hundreds of seeds from the Survivor Tree are planted annually and the resulting saplings are distributed each year on the anniversary of the bombing. Thousands of Survivor Trees are growing in public and private places all over the U.S.
- The Memorial Fence: a 10-foot-tall (3.0 m) chain link fence was installed around the area that is now the Reflecting Pool and the Field of Empty Chairs to protect the site from damage and visitors from injury. The Fence stood for more than four years, becoming notable as the place where visitors left stuffed animals, poems, keychains, and other items as tributes. During the construction of the Outdoor Memorial, 210 feet (64 m) of the Fence was moved to the west side of the Memorial, along the 9:03 side or the 'healing' side. The remainder of the Fence is in storage. Visitors may still leave small items along and in the Fence; the mementos are periodically collected, cataloged, and stored.
- Rescuers' Orchard: a grove of Oklahoma redbuds (Oklahoma's state tree), Amur Maple, Chinese Pistache, and Bosque Elm trees are planted on the lawn around the Survivor Tree. The trees represent the rescuers who came to the aid of the survivors; hence the rescuers' orchard surrounds the survivor tree. The non-native species represent those rescuers who came from outside Oklahoma to help.
- Children's Area: more than 5,000 hand-painted tiles, from all over the United States and Canada, were made by children and sent to Oklahoma City after the bombing in 1995. Most are stored in the Memorial's Archives, and a sampling of tiles is on the wall in the Children's Area. Chalkboards provide a place where children can draw and share their feelings. The Children's Area is north of the 9:03 gate, on the west side of the Museum.
- Journal Record Building: north of the memorial is the Journal Record Building, which formerly housed the offices of The Journal Record. It now houses the Oklahoma City National Memorial Museum, which features numerous exhibits and artifacts related to the Oklahoma City bombing.
- Alfred P. Murrah Federal Building Plaza: located just south of the Field of Empty Chairs, above the underground parking garage, is the raised Alfred P. Murrah Federal Building Plaza. An original part of the federal building, the plaza had a garden and seating areas, as well as a playground for the daycare center. Visitors to the Memorial can walk across the plaza, where the original flagpole is used for the American flag.
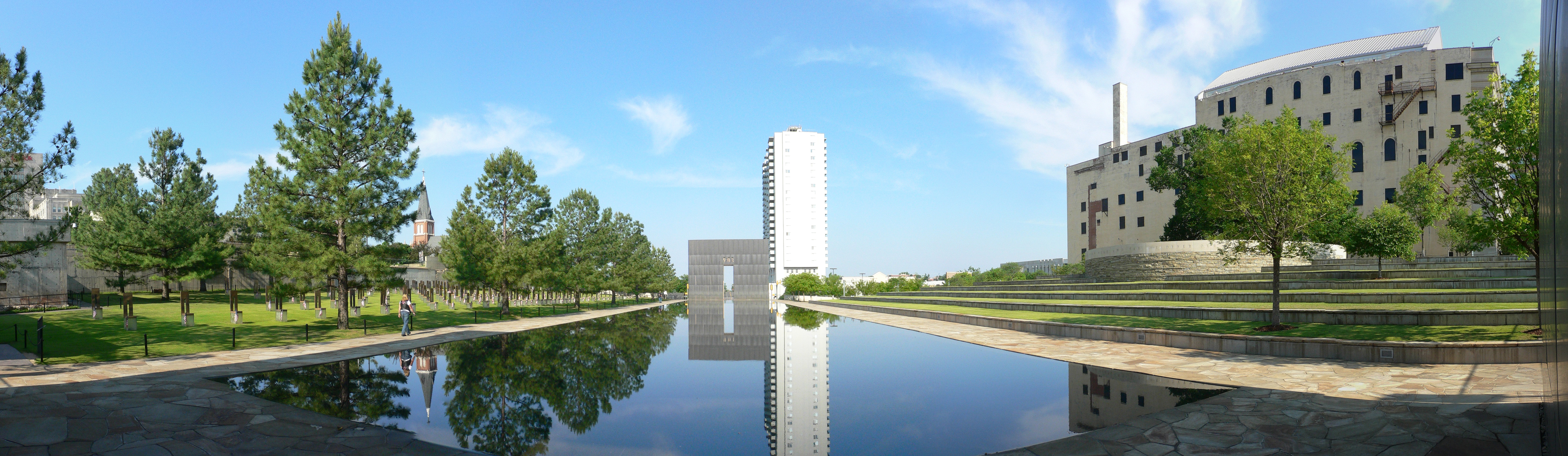
Panoramic view of the Oklahoma City National Memorial

== Adjacent memorials ==
Two churches were located across the street from the Murrah Building. Both were heavily damaged by the blast. Each church was repaired and both constructed memorials on their property. While not part of the official memorial they are open to the public.

- Heartland Chapel: across the street from the 9:01 gate is an open air wooden chapel erected by First United Methodist Church of Oklahoma City. The altar is made from church stones damaged by the bombing. A substantial portion of the funding for the chapel was provided by the Jewish community.
- And Jesus Wept: across the street from the 9:03 gate is a sculpture of Jesus weeping erected by St. Joseph's Catholic Church, one of the first brick-and-mortar churches built in the city. Jesus faces away from the devastation, covering his face with his hand. In front of Jesus is a wall with 168 gaps in it, representing the voids left by each life lost.

== See also ==
- List of national memorials of the United States
- National Register of Historic Places listings in Oklahoma County, Oklahoma
