= The Devon Mosaic: As Long as the Waters Flow =

Mosaic in Oklahoma City, Oklahoma, U.S.

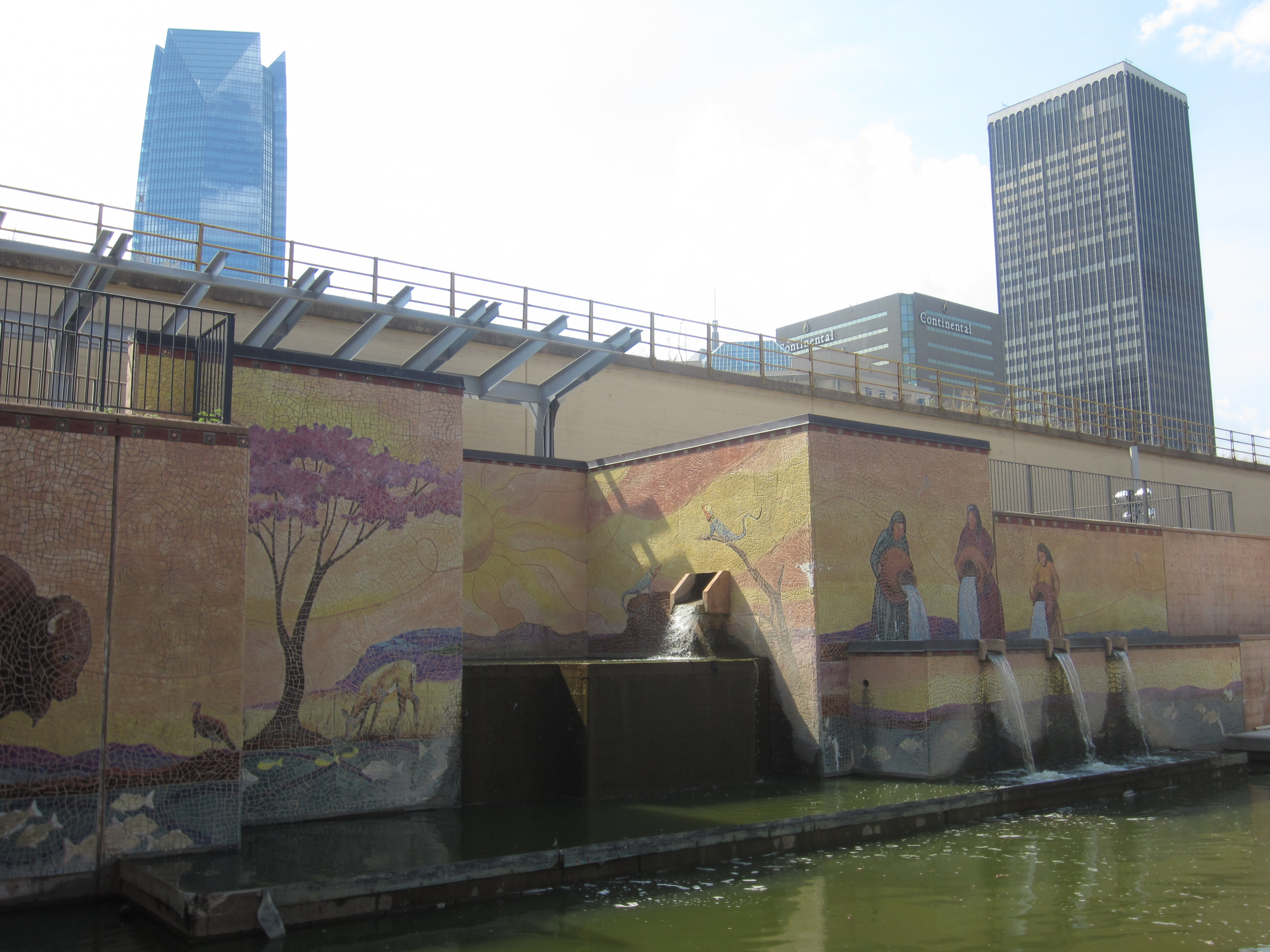
- Artist: Mary Ann Moore
- Year: 2007
- Location: Oklahoma City, Oklahoma, U.S.
- Coordinates: 35°27′55.5″N 97°30′43.8″W

The Devon Mosaic: As Long as the Waters Flow is a 2007 mosaic by Mary Ann Moore, installed at the northwest corner of Oklahoma City, Oklahoma's Bricktown Canal, in the United States. The 1150-square-foot artwork was funded by Devon Energy as part of the state's centennial celebrations.
