= Iron Feathers =

Sculpture in Oklahoma City, Oklahoma, U.S.

- Artist: Rand Elliott
- Year: 1990
- Location: Oklahoma City, Oklahoma, U.S.
- 35.401670°N 97.595863°W

Iron Feathers is an outdoor 1990 sculpture by Rand Elliott, installed outside Oklahoma City's Will Rogers World Airport, in the U.S. state of Oklahoma. The steel pipe artwork was dedicated on April 13, 1990.

== See also ==
- 1990 in art
