= Roger Williams (Wisconsin politician) =

American politician

Member of the Wisconsin State Assembly from the Vernon 2nd district
- In office January 6, 1879 – January 5, 1880
- Preceded by: Allen Rusk
- Succeeded by: David C. Yakey

Personal details
- Born: January 21, 1836 Oswego, New York, U.S.
- Died: December 20, 1916 (aged 80) Hillsboro, Wisconsin, U.S.
- Party: Republican
- Spouse: Ellen Melissa Matteson (m. 1842; died 1903)
- Children: Ella R. Williams; George A. Williams

Military service
- Allegiance: United States
- Branch/service: United States Army; Union Army
- Years of service: 1862–1864
- Unit: 110th Reg. N.Y. Vol. Infantry
- Battles/wars: American Civil War: Siege of Port Hudson; Battle of Irish Bend

Roger Williams (January 21, 1836 – December 20, 1916) was an American merchant, farmer, and Republican politician. He served one term in the Wisconsin State Assembly (1879) and served ten years as chairman of the town of Hillsboro, Wisconsin.

== Biography ==
Williams was born on January 21, 1836, in Oswego, New York. At age 14, he joined the crew of a merchant ship, and worked in the sea-faring merchant trade for the next nine years. At age 23, he engaged in a grocery business in New York, where he worked until the outbreak of the American Civil War.

In 1862, Williams volunteered for the Union Army, and mustered into service with Company I of the 110th New York Infantry Regiment. The 110th New York Infantry shipped out from Baltimore to Fort Monroe, Virginia, and then to New Orleans, Louisiana, for service in the Lower Seaboard Theater of the American Civil War. They were assigned to the Department of the Gulf and participated in the Siege of Port Hudson and the Battle of Irish Bend. Williams resigned due to disability in early 1864 after 18 months of service.

In 1865, he purchased a partially improved farmstead in the town of Hillsboro, in Vernon County, Wisconsin, and settled there in October of that year. He was elected chairman of the Hillsboro town board for ten years, was a leader on the local school board, and represented Hillsboro on the Vernon County Board of Supervisors. He was elected to the Wisconsin State Assembly for the 1879 session, representing Vernon County's 2nd (eastern) district.

In 1884, he moved into the village of Hillsboro, where he owned a restaurant, though he continued to cultivate his farm. He served the last 30 years of his life as a justice of the peace for Vernon County.

He died December 20, 1916, at his home in Hillsboro, after a short illness.

== Personal life and family ==
Williams married Ellen Melissa Matteson in 1842. They had at least two children before her death in 1903. At the time of her death, Williams was still living.

Williams was an active member of the Grand Army of the Republic, the Independent Order of Odd Fellows, and the Masons.

Wisconsin State Assembly
Preceded by Allen Rusk	Member of the Wisconsin State Assembly from the Vernon 2nd district January 6, 1879 – January 5, 1880	Succeeded by David C. Yakey
