= Allen Rusk =

19th century American politician

Member of the Wisconsin State Assembly from the Vernon 2nd district
- In office January 3, 1881 – January 2, 1882
- Preceded by: David C. Yakey
- Succeeded by: Thomas J. Shear
- In office January 7, 1878 – January 6, 1879
- Preceded by: Henry H. Wyatt
- Succeeded by: Roger Williams

Personal details
- Born: February 6, 1825 Perry County, Ohio, U.S.
- Died: March 12, 1904 (aged 79) Viroqua, Wisconsin, U.S.
- Resting place: Viroqua Cemetery
- Party: Republican
- Spouse: Mary Newton (m. 1843; died 1904)
- Children: Henry McLain Rusk^{(b. 1844; died 1917)}; Hannah Jane Rusk^{(b. 1846; died 1860)}; Albert Jackson Rusk^{(b. 1848; died 1930)}; Jasper Bennett Rusk^{(b. 1850; died 1936)}; Jeremiah Newton Rusk^{(b. 1855; died 1941)}; Romulus Allen Rusk^{(b. 1859; died 1937)}
- Relatives: Jeremiah McLain Rusk (brother); Lycurgus J. Rusk (nephew)
- Occupation: Farmer

Military service
- Allegiance: United States
- Branch/service: United States Volunteers; Union Army
- Years of service: 1864–1865
- Rank: Corporal, USV
- Unit: 42nd Reg. Wis. Vol. Infantry
- Battles/wars: American Civil War

Allen Eugene Rusk (February 6, 1825 – March 12, 1904) was an American farmer, Republican politician, and Wisconsin pioneer. He was a member of the Wisconsin State Assembly for two terms, representing Vernon County during the 1878 and 1881 terms. He was an older brother of Jeremiah McLain Rusk, who was governor of Wisconsin and U.S. secretary of agriculture.

== Early life ==
Allen Rusk was born on February 6, 1825, in Clayton Township, Perry County, Ohio. When he was a child, he moved with his family to Morgan County, Ohio, where he was raised on his father's farm and educated in the common schools. He also apprenticed in plastering. In 1852, he moved came to Wisconsin, settling originally at Lancaster, Grant County. In December 1852, he hauled a load of merchandise to Vernon County for Henry McAulley, who operated a store there. While in Vernon County, Rusk began to look for land to make a permanent home for his family. He brought his family to Viroqua, Wisconsin, in October 1853, and in the spring of 1854, he selected a large plot of land in what is now Liberty, Vernon County, Wisconsin. He settled on the land in April 1855. At the time, that area was still part of a larger township of Viroqua, and Rusk is credited for getting the town of Liberty established as a separate entity.

Rusk was elected the first chairman of the Liberty town board, and served at least seven years in that role.

== Civil War service ==
Rusk volunteered for duty in the Union Army in the fourth year of the American Civil War. He was enrolled as a private in Company I of the 42nd Wisconsin Infantry Regiment. The 42nd Infantry mustered into federal service on September 7, 1864, and spent their entire service on provost duty in southern Illinois. They mustered out of federal service on June 20, 1865.

== Political career ==
Rusk was elected to the Wisconsin State Assembly on the Republican Party ticket in 1877 and 1880. He served in the 1878 and 1881 legislative terms. During the 1881 term, he was serving in the Legislature while his brother was Governor.

== Personal life and legacy ==
Rusk was the sixth of 7 children born to Daniel Rusk and his wife Jane (née Faulkner). Allen Rusk's younger brother was Jeremiah McLain Rusk, who had distinguished Union Army service in the Civil War and went on to become a U.S. congressman, Governor of Wisconsin, United States Secretary of Agriculture, and namesake of Rusk County, Wisconsin. Jeremiah's son Lycurgus J. Rusk also served in the Wisconsin State Assembly.

Allen Rusk married Mary Newton, of Harrison County, Virginia, in 1843. They had six children together but one daughter died young. They were ultimately married for over 60 years, dying within days of each other in March 1904.

The town of Liberty, Wisconsin, was formerly named "Rusk Corners" after Rusk.

== Electoral history ==
=== Wisconsin Assembly (1878) ===
Wisconsin Assembly, Vernon 2nd District Election, 1877
Party	Candidate	Votes	%	±%
General Election, November 6, 1877
Republican	Allen E. Rusk	800	58.82%	
Greenback	Marvin Henry	560	41.18%	
Plurality		240	17.65%	
Total votes		1,360	100.0%	
Republican hold				

=== Wisconsin Assembly (1881) ===
Wisconsin Assembly, Vernon 2nd District Election, 1880
Party	Candidate	Votes	%	±%
General Election, November 2, 1880
Republican	Allen E. Rusk	1,309	57.11%	−5.40pp
Democratic	C. G. Stebbins	983	42.89%	+30.16pp
Plurality		326	14.22%	-23.52pp
Total votes		2,292	100.0%	+46.64%
Republican hold				

Wisconsin State Assembly
Preceded by Henry H. Wyatt	Member of the Wisconsin State Assembly from the Vernon 2nd district January 7, 1878 – January 6, 1879	Succeeded by Roger Williams
Preceded by David C. Yakey	Member of the Wisconsin State Assembly from the Vernon 2nd district January 3, 1881 – January 2, 1882	Succeeded by Thomas J. Shear
