= Sanford Airport =

Sanford Airport may refer to:

- Orlando Sanford International Airport serving Sanford, Florida, United States (FAA/IATA: SFB)
- Sanford Regional Airport serving Sanford, Maine, United States (FAA/IATA: SFM)
- Sanford-Lee County Regional Airport serving Sanford, North Carolina, United States (FAA: TTA)
- Joshua Sanford Field serving Hillsboro, Wisconsin, United States (FAA: HBW)
