= HBW =

HBW may refer to:

- Brinell scale, measuring indentation hardness
- Handbook of the Birds of the World
- Hawaiian baby woodrose (Argyreia nervosa), a perennial climbing vine with psychoactive seeds
- H-B Woodlawn, a school in Arlington, Virginia, United States
- HBW Balingen-Weilstetten, a German handball club
- Hot bridgewire
- Joshua Sanford Field, serving Hillsboro, Wisconsin, United States
- Heartbreak Weather, the second studio album by Niall Horan.
- Hiroshi Blackwood, a poet on Allpoetry
