= Marc Mitscher =

United States Navy admiral (1887–1947)

Marc Andrew Mitscher
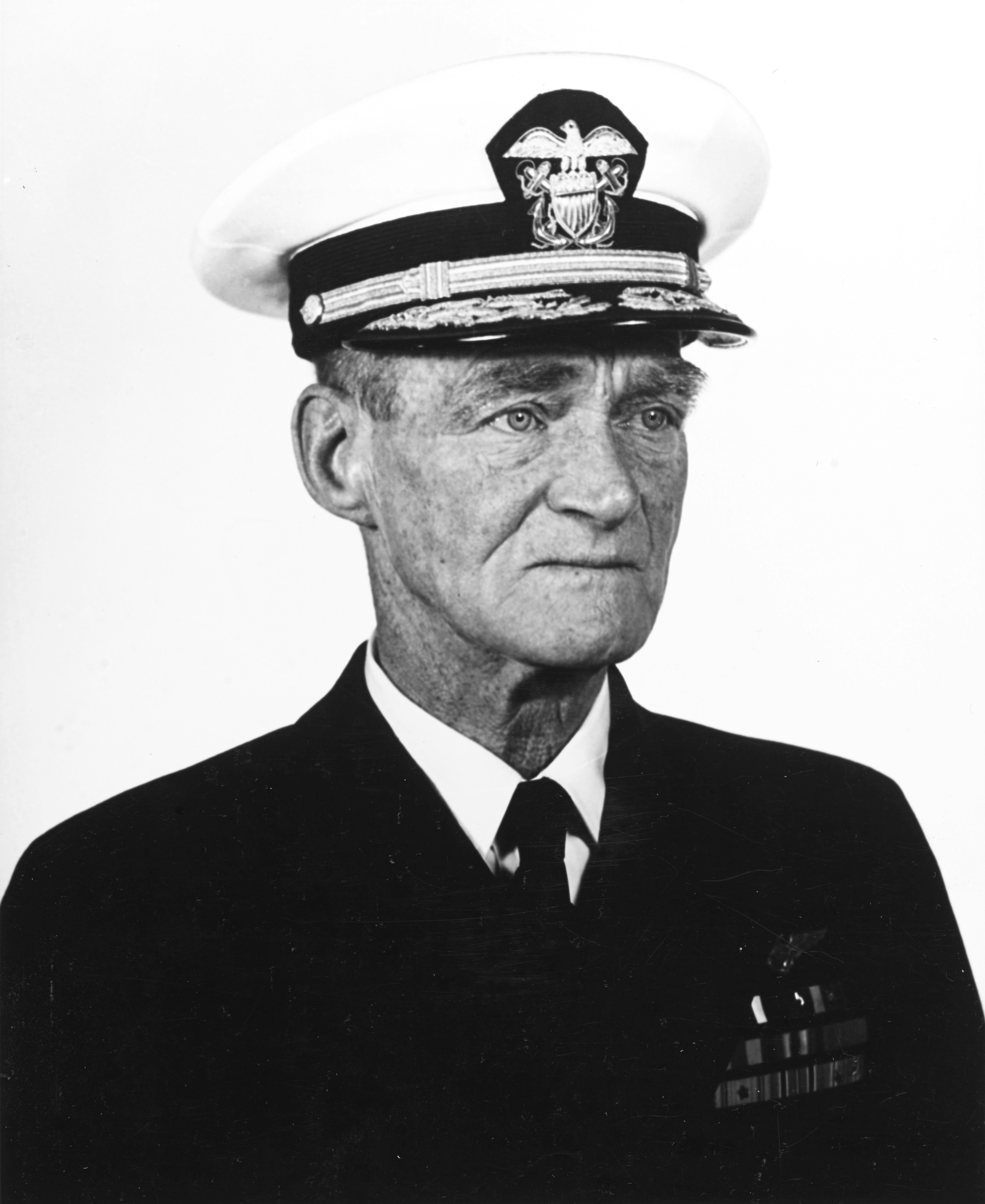
- Marc A. Mitscher, then a vice admiral (c. 1944–45)
- Born: January 26, 1887; Hillsboro, Wisconsin U.S
- Died: February 3, 1947 (aged 60); Norfolk, Virginia U.S
- Burial place: Arlington National Cemetery
- Military career
- Allegiance: United States
- Branch: United States Navy
- Service years: 1910–1947
- Rank: Admiral
- Nickname: "Pete"
- Service number: 7591
- Commands: USS Wright; USS Hornet; Commander Air, Solomon Islands; Fast Carrier Task Force; Eighth Fleet; Atlantic Fleet
- Conflicts: World War I; World War II; Doolittle Raid; Battle of Midway; Solomon Islands campaign; Battle of the Philippine Sea; Battle of Leyte Gulf; Battle of Iwo Jima; Battle of Okinawa
- Awards: Navy Cross (3); Navy Distinguished Service Medal (3); Legion of Merit

Marc Andrew "Pete" Mitscher (January 26, 1887 – February 3, 1947) was a pioneer in naval aviation who became an admiral in the United States Navy, and served as commander of the Fast Carrier Task Force in the Pacific during World War II.

== Early life and career ==
Mitscher was born in Hillsboro, Wisconsin, on January 26, 1887, the son of Oscar and Myrta (Shear) Mitscher. Mitscher's grandfather, Andreas Mitscher (1821–1905), was a German immigrant from Traben-Trarbach. His other grandfather, Thomas J. Shear, was a member of the Wisconsin State Assembly. During the western land boom of 1889, when Marc was two years old, his family resettled in Oklahoma City, Oklahoma, where his father, a federal Indian agent, later became that city's second mayor. His uncle, Byron D. Shear, would also become mayor.

Mitscher attended elementary and secondary schools in Washington, D.C. He received an appointment to the United States Naval Academy at Annapolis, Maryland, in 1904 through Bird Segle McGuire, then U.S. Representative from Oklahoma.

An indifferent student with a lackluster sense of military deportment, Mitscher's career at the naval academy did not portend the accomplishments he would achieve later in life. Nicknamed after Annapolis's first midshipman from Oklahoma, Peter Cassius Marcellus Cade, who had "bilged-out" in 1903, upperclassmen compelled young Mitscher to recite the entire name as a hazing. Soon he was referred to as "Oklahoma Pete", with the nickname shortened to just "Pete" by the winter of his youngster (sophomore) year.

Having amassed 159 demerits and showing poorly in his class work, Mitscher was saddled with a forced resignation at the end of his sophomore year. At the insistence of his father, Mitscher re-applied and was granted reappointment, though he had to re-enter the academy as a first year plebe.

This time the stoic Mitscher worked straight through, and on June 3, 1910, he graduated 113th out of a class of 131. Following graduation he served two years at sea aboard USS Colorado, and was commissioned ensign on March 7, 1912. In August 1913, he served aboard USS California on the West Coast. During that time, Mexico was experiencing a political disturbance, and California was sent to protect U.S. interests and citizens. He married Frances Smalley on January 16, 1913.

=== Naval aviation ===
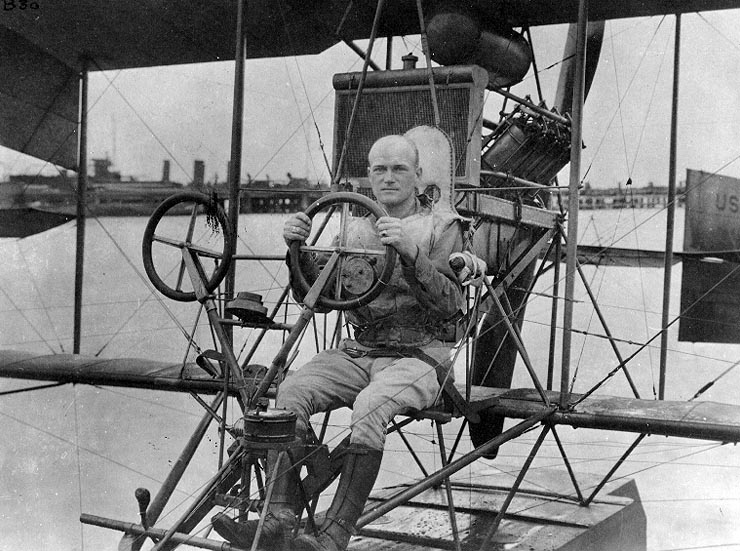
Naval aviator Marc A. Mitscher, circa 1916. Mitscher was among the first naval aviators.

Mitscher took an early interest in aviation, requesting a transfer to aeronautics while aboard Colorado in his last year as a midshipman, but his request was not granted. After graduating he continued to make requests for transfer to aviation while serving on the destroyers USS Whipple and USS Stewart. Mitscher was in charge of the engine room on USS Stewart when orders to transfer to the Naval Aeronautic Station in Pensacola, Florida, came in.

Mitscher was assigned to the armored cruiser USS North Carolina, which was being used to experiment as a launching platform for aircraft. The ship had been fitted with a catapult over her fantail. Mitscher trained as a pilot, earning his wings and the designation Naval Aviator. Mitscher was one of the first naval aviators, receiving No. 33 on June 2, 1916. Almost a year later, on April 6, 1917, he reported to the renamed armored cruiser USS West Virginia for duty in connection with aircraft catapult experiments. During World War I, the Navy established Naval Air Station Montauk in August 1917, commanded by LT Marc Mitscher. Reconnaissance dirigibles, an airplane, troops, and Coast Guard personnel were stationed at Montauk L.I. New York.

At this early date the Navy was interested in using aircraft for scouting purposes and as spotters for direction of their gunnery. Lieutenant Mitscher was placed in command of NAS Dinner Key in Coconut Grove, Florida. Dinner Key was the second largest naval air facility in the U.S. and was used to train seaplane pilots for the Naval Reserve Flying Corps. On July 18, 1918, he was promoted to lieutenant commander. In February 1919, he transferred from NAS Dinner Key to the Aviation Section in the Office of the Chief of Naval Operations, before reporting to Seaplane Division 1.

== Interwar assignments (1919–1939) ==
=== Transatlantic crossing ===
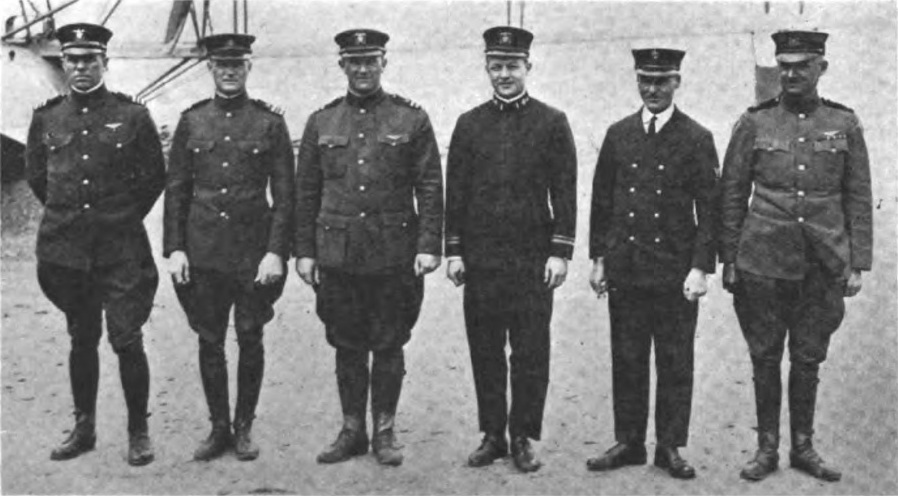
Crew of the N.C-1 from left to right: Lieutenant-Commander P. N. L. Bellinger, commander; Lieut.-Commander M. A. Mitscher, pilot; Lieut. J. T. Barin, pilot; Lieut. (j.g.) Harry Sodenwater, radio operator; Chief Machinist's Mate C. I. Kessler, engineer; Machinist Rasmus Christensen, reserve pilot engineer

On May 10, 1919, Mitscher was among a group of naval aviators attempting the first transatlantic crossing by air. Among the men involved were fellow future admirals Jack Towers, Albert C. Read and Patrick N. L. Bellinger. Mitscher piloted NC-1, one of three Curtiss NC flying boats that attempted the flight, under the command of Bellinger. Taking off from Newfoundland, he nearly reached the Azores before heavy fog caused loss of the horizon, making flying in the early aircraft extremely dangerous. What appeared to be fairly calm seas at altitude turned out to be a heavy chop, and a control cable snapped while setting the aircraft down. Mitscher and his five crewmen were left to sit atop the upper wing of their "Nancy" while they waited to be rescued. Of the three aircraft making the attempt, only NC-4 under command of Read successfully completed the crossing. For his part in the effort Mitscher received the Navy Cross, the citation reading:

"For distinguished service in the line of his profession as a member of the crew of the Seaplane NC-1, which made a long overseas flight from New Foundland to the vicinity of the Azores, in May 1919".

Mitscher was also made an officer of the Order of the Tower and Sword by the Portuguese government on June 3, 1919.

On October 14, 1919, Mitscher reported for duty aboard Aroostook, a minelayer refitted as an "aircraft tender" that had been used as a support ship for the "Nancys' " transatlantic flight. He served under Captain Henry C. Mustin, another pioneering naval aviator. Aroostook was assigned temporary duties as flagship for the Air Detachment, Pacific Fleet. Mitscher was promoted to commander on July 1, 1921. In May 1922, he was detached from Air Squadrons, Pacific Fleet (San Diego, California) to command Naval Air Station Anacostia, D.C.

=== Service debates in Washington ===
After six months in command at Anacostia he was assigned to a newly formed department, the Navy Bureau of Aeronautics. Here as a young aviator he assisted Rear Admiral William Moffett in defending the Navy's interest in air assets. General Billy Mitchell was advancing the idea that the nation was best defended by an independent service which would control all military aircraft. Though Mitscher was not a vocal member of the Navy's representatives, his knowledge of aircraft capabilities and limitations was instrumental in the Navy being able to answer Mitchell's challenge and retain their own air groups. The debate culminated in the hearings before the Morrow Board, convened to study the best means of applying aviation to national defense. Mitscher testified before the board on October 6, 1925. General Mitchell sought public support for his position by taking his case directly to the people through the national press. For this action Mitchell was summoned for a court-martial. One of the witnesses called by the prosecution was Mitscher. In the end the Navy was left with its own air resources, and was allowed to continue to develop its own independent aviation branch.

=== California–Hawaii flight ===
Mitscher was one of six pilots who took part in a flight by six U.S. Navy Consolidated P2Y flying boats which set a new nonstop straight-line distance record of 2,399 miles (3,861 km), as well as a new nonstop distance record for formation flying, in a flight from San Francisco, California, to Pearl Harbor in the Territory of Hawaii on January 10–11, 1934. They also set a new speed record for this crossing of 24 hours 35 minutes, averaging 98 mph (158 km/h).

=== Development of the carrier air arm ===
During the interwar period, Mitscher worked to develop naval aviation, taking assignments serving on the aircraft carriers Langley and Saratoga, on the seaplane tender Wright, and as commanding officer of Patrol Wing 1, in addition to a number of assignments ashore. Langley was the Navy's first aircraft carrier. A converted collier, she could only make 14 knots (26 km/h), thus limiting her ability to generate wind over her flight deck and lift under the wings of her aircraft for launching and recovery. Aboard Langley Mitscher and other naval aviation pioneers developed many of the methods by which aircraft would be handled aboard U.S. Navy aircraft carriers. Many of these techniques continue to be used in the current-day U.S. Navy.

During this period Mitscher was assigned command of the air group for the newly commissioned aircraft carrier Saratoga. Mitscher was the first person to land an airplane onto the flight deck of Saratoga as he brought his air group aboard. The vessel conducted mock attacks against the Panama Canal and Pearl Harbor in a series of Fleet Problem exercises. The key lesson learned by the naval aviation officers during these exercises was the importance to locate and destroy the other side's flight decks as early as possible, while still preserving your own. In 1938, Mitscher was promoted to captain.

== World War II ==
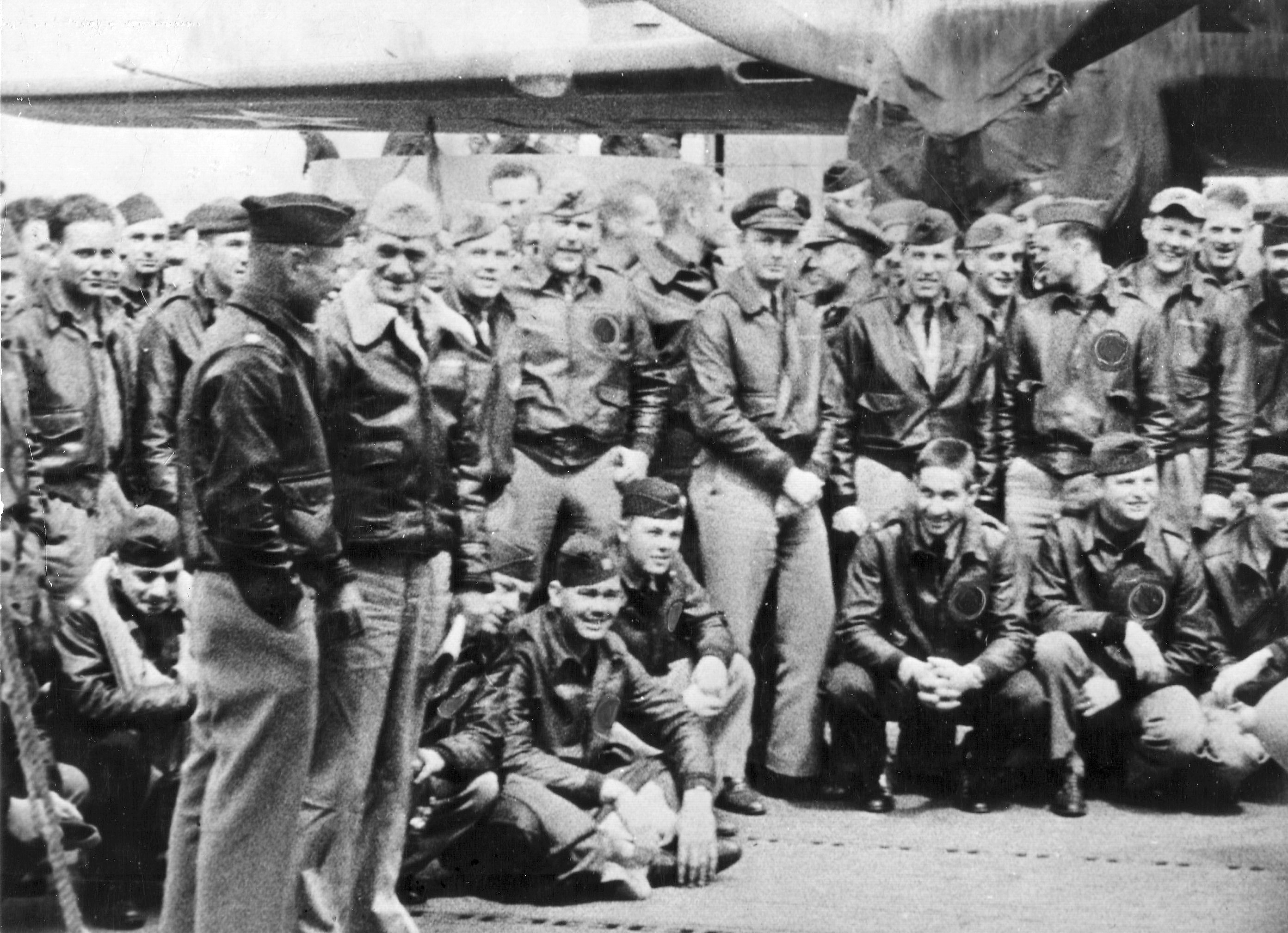
Lt. Colonel James Doolittle and Captain Marc Mitscher on board USS Hornet. (Note: Mitscher is wearing an Army Air Force flight jacket. The photo was touched up to obscure the view of the jacket insignia of the air crews.)

Between June 1939 and July 1941, Mitscher served as assistant chief of the Bureau of Aeronautics.

=== Carrier commander ===
Mitscher's next assignment was as captain of the Yorktown-class aircraft carrier USS Hornet, being fitted out at Newport News Shipbuilding in Newport News, Virginia. Upon her commissioning in October 1941, he assumed command, taking Hornet to the Naval Station Norfolk for her training out period. She was there in Virginia when the Japanese attacked Pearl Harbor. Newest of the Navy's fleet carriers, Mitscher worked hard to get ship and crew ready for combat. Following her shake-down cruise in the Caribbean, Mitscher was consulted on the possibility of launching long-range bombers off the deck of a carrier. In April 1942, after affirming it could be done, the sixteen B-25 bombers of the Doolittle Raid were loaded on deck aboard Hornet for a transpacific voyage while Hornet's own flight group was stored below deck in her hangar. Hornet rendezvoused with Enterprise and Task Force 16 in the mid-Pacific just north of Hawaii. Under the command of Admiral Halsey, the task force proceeded in radio silence to a launch point 650 miles (1,050 km) from Japan. Enterprise provided the air cover for both aircraft carriers while Hornet's flight deck was taken up ferrying the B-25s. Hornet, then, was the real life "Shangri-la" that President Roosevelt referred to as the source of the B-25s in his announcement of the bombing attack on Tokyo.

=== Battle of Midway ===
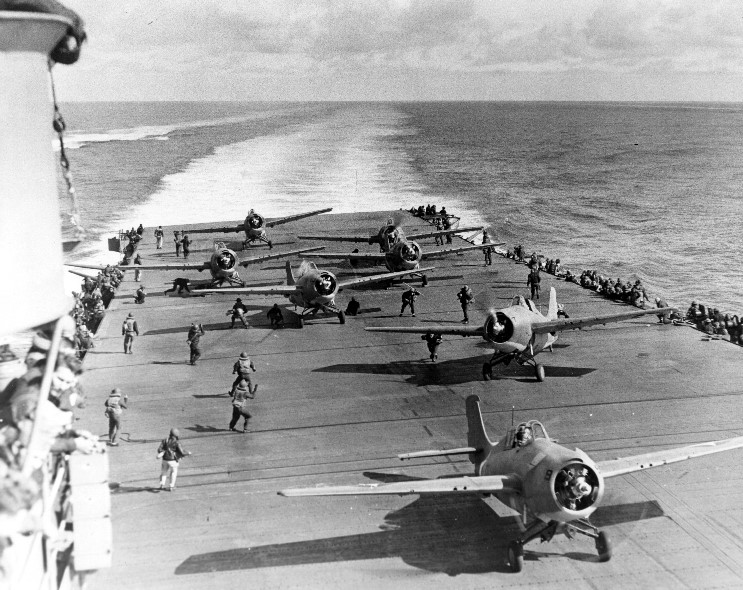
F4F Wildcats of VF-8 prepare to launch from USS Hornet.

During the Battle of Midway, 4–7 June 1942, Hornet and Enterprise carried the air groups that made up the strike force of Task Force 16, while Yorktown carried the aircraft of Task Force 17. Mitscher had command of the newest carrier in the battle and had the least experienced air group. As the battle unfolded, the Japanese carrier force was sighted early on June 4 at 234 degrees and about 140 miles (230 km) from Task Force 16, sailing on a northwest heading. In plotting their attack there was strong disagreement among the air group commanders aboard Hornet as to the best intercept course. Lieutenant Commander Stanhope C. Ring, in overall command of Hornet's air groups, chose a course of 263 degrees, nearly true west, as the most likely solution to bring them to the Japanese carrier group. He had not anticipated the Japanese turning east into the wind while they recovered their aircraft. Lieutenant Commander John C. Waldron, in command of the torpedo bombers of Torpedo Eight, strongly disagreed with Ring's flight plan. An aggressive aviator, he assured Mitscher he would get his group into combat and deliver their ordnance, no matter the cost.

Thirty minutes after the Hornet air groups set out, Waldron broke away from the higher flying fighters and dive bombers, coming to a course of 240 degrees. This proved to be an excellent heading, as his Torpedo Eight squadron flew directly to the enemy carrier group's location "as though on a plumb line". They did so with no supporting fighters. On their way Torpedo Eight was picked up by Enterprise's VF-6 fighter squadron flying several thousand feet above them. This group had launched last off Enterprise and had not been able to catch up with or locate the Enterprise dive bombers, but when Waldron dropped his group down to the deck to prepare for their attack the Enterprise fighters lost sight of them, leaving Torpedo Eight on their own.

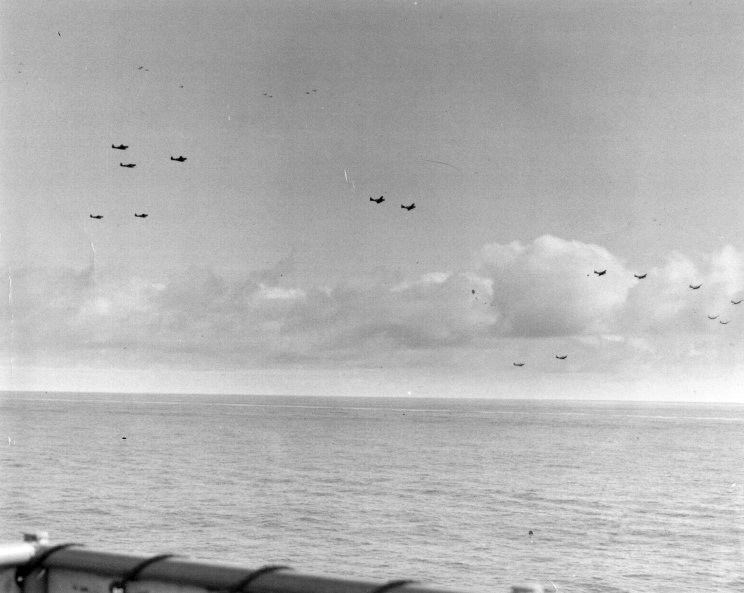
The fifteen Devastators of VT-8 form up as they leave Hornet.

The first of the carrier squadrons to locate the Japanese carriers, Waldron bore down upon the enemy. He brought his group in low, slowing for their torpedo drops. With no fighter escort and no other attackers on hand to split the defenders, his group was devastated by defending Japanese Zeros flying combat air patrol (CAP). All fifteen TBD Devastators of VT-8 were shot down. Though not known at the time, the efforts of Torpedo Eight failed to deliver a hit on the Japanese carriers. Of the Torpedo Eight aircrews, only Ensign George H. Gay, Jr. survived. About twenty minutes later Enterprise's Torpedo Six made their own attack, and was met with a similar hot reception. Again, no torpedo hits were made, but five of the aircraft managed to survive the engagement. Though failing to inflict any damage, the torpedo attacks did pull the Japanese CAP down and northeast of the carrier force, leaving the approach from other angles unhindered. Additionally, the attacks occupied the Japanese carriers with defending themselves, crucially delaying their ability to arm, spot and launch their own aerial strikes.

SBD dive bombers from Enterprise arriving from the south flew over the Japanese carrier force to reach their tipping points almost unopposed. They delivered a devastating blow to Kaga and managed to put a bomb into Akagi as well, while SBDs coming from the east from Yorktown dove down upon Sōryū and shattered her flight deck. All three ships were set ablaze, knocked out of the battle to sink later that day. While these attacks were in progress, Ring continued his search on a course of 260 degrees, flying to the north of the battle. Unable to find the enemy and running low on fuel, Hornet's strike groups eventually turned back, either toward Hornet or to Midway Island itself. All ten fighters in the formation ran out of fuel and had to ditch at sea. Several of her SBDs heading to Midway also ran out of fuel and had to ditch on their approach to the Midway base. Other SBDs attempting to return to Hornet were unable to locate her, and disappeared into the vast Pacific. All these aircraft were lost, though a number of the pilots were later rescued. Of Hornet's air groups, only Torpedo Eight ended up reaching the enemy that morning. Hornet's air groups suffered a 50 percent loss rate without achieving any combat results.

The battle was a great victory and Mitscher congratulated his crew for their efforts, but Hornet's performance had not lived up to his expectations and he felt he had failed to deliver the results he should have. In addition, he felt great regret for the loss of John Waldron and Torpedo Eight. For the next three years he would try to secure the award of the Medal of Honor to the entire unit, but without success. The pilots of Torpedo Eight were eventually awarded the Navy Cross.

Mitscher's decisions in the battle have come under scrutiny largely due to the questionable actions of his subordinates and discrepancies in his After Action report. According to author Robert J. Mrazek, Mitscher backed up Ring's decision to take the heading of 263 degrees, as well as the decision to keep the fighters at high altitude, too high to effectively cover the torpedo bombers. Mrazek states that Waldron vehemently protested both decisions in front of Ring and Mitscher, but was overruled by the latter. At the time, American intelligence reports indicated that the Japanese might be operating their carriers in two groups, and the search plane contact report stated that only two carriers had been found. Mitscher and Ring had agreed on the westerly heading in order to search behind the enemy task force for a possible trailing group. A further controversy exists in that the only official report from Hornet states that the strike took a course heading of 239 degrees and missed the Japanese task force because it had turned north. This statement does not agree with some testimonies of Air Group Eight pilots and other evidence, most noticeably that none of the downed VF-10 pilots who were later rescued were found along the 238 course heading. Finally, the fact that no After Action reports were filed other than the one signed by Mitscher containing the 239 course heading is unusual. Mrazek believes that the lack of reports indicates a cover-up, possibly in an effort to protect Mitscher's reputation.

=== Commander Air Solomon Islands ===
Prior to the Midway operation Mitscher had been promoted to rear admiral in preparation for his next assignment, the command of Patrol Wing 2. Though Mitscher preferred to be at sea, he held this command until December when he was sent to the South Pacific as Commander Fleet Air, Nouméa. Four months later in April 1943, Halsey moved Mitscher up to Guadalcanal, assigning him to the thick of the fight as Commander Air, Solomon Islands (COMAIRSOLS). Here Mitscher directed an assortment of Army, Navy, Marine and New Zealand aircraft in the air war over Guadalcanal and up the Solomon chain. Said Halsey: "I knew we'd probably catch hell from the Japs in the air. That's why I sent Pete Mitscher up there. Pete was a fighting fool and I knew it." Short on aircraft, fuel and ammunition, the atmosphere on Guadalcanal was one of dogged defense. Mitscher brought a fresh outlook, and instilled an offensive mindset to his assorted air commands. Mitscher later said this assignment managing the constant air combat over Guadalcanal was his toughest duty of the war.

=== Battles for the Central Pacific ===
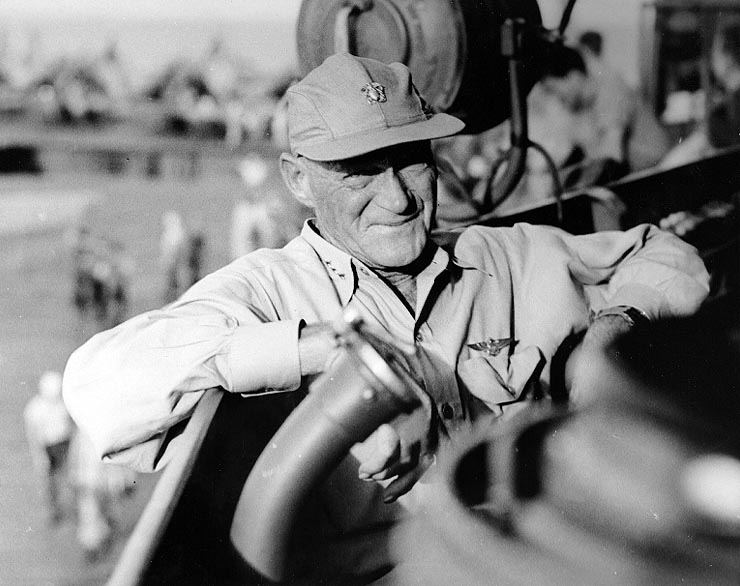
Vice Admiral Mitscher aboard his flagship, Lexington, in 1944.

Returning to the Central Pacific as commander, Carrier Division 3, Mitscher was given primary responsibility for the development and operations of a newly formed Fast Carrier Task Force, at that time operating as Task Force 58 as part of Admiral Raymond Spruance's Fifth Fleet. To that point in the conflict carriers had been able to bring enough airpower to bear to inflict significant damage on opposing naval forces, but they always acted as a raiding group against land bases. They would approach their objective, inflict damage, and then escape into the vast reaches of the Pacific. Even the Japanese attack on Pearl Harbor, devastating though it was, was a carrier raid. Naval airpower was not thought to have the capacity to challenge land-based airpower over any length of time. Mitscher was about to change that, leading U.S. naval airpower into a new realm of operations.

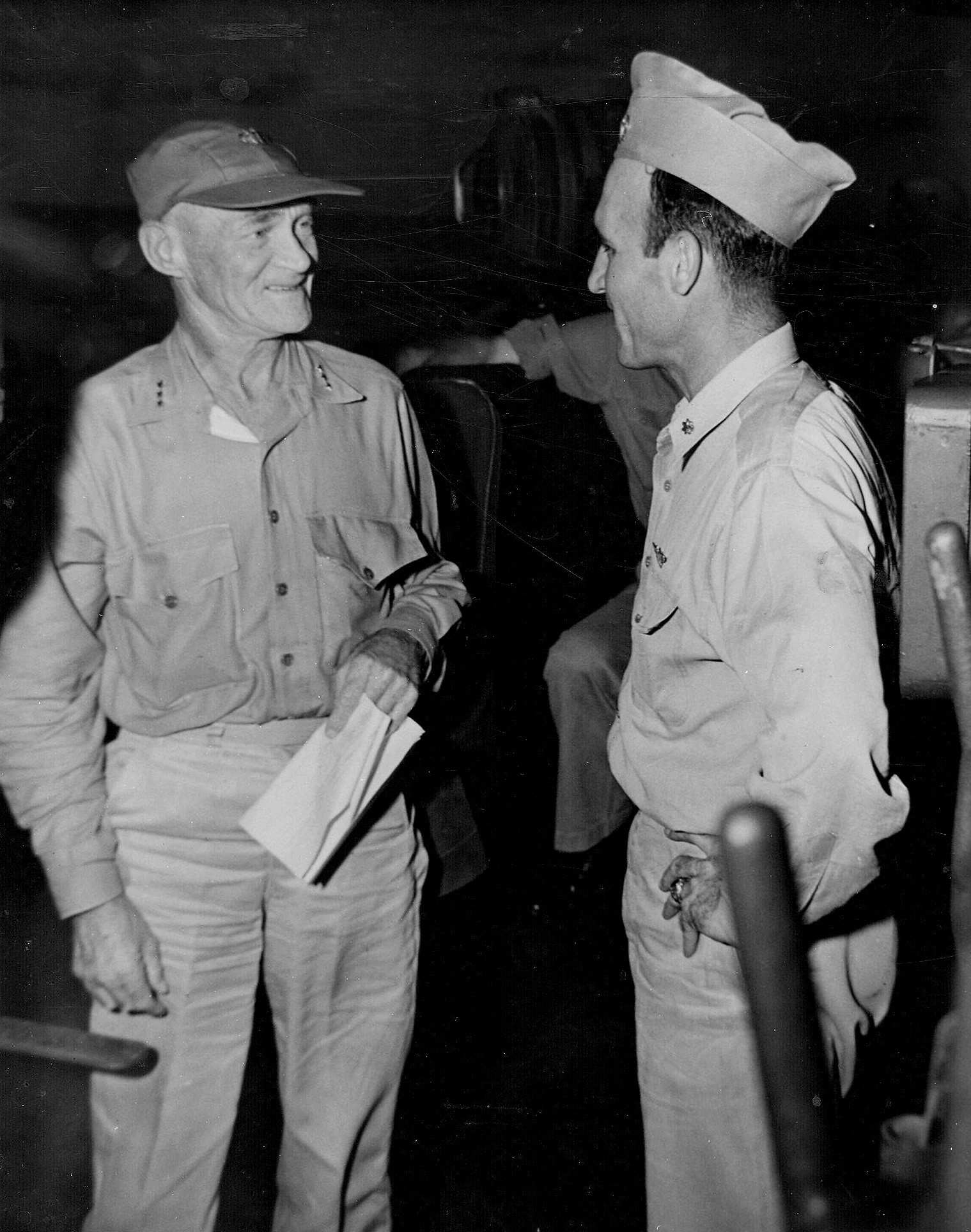
Mitscher speaks with Air Group Commander David McCampbell, the task force's leading pilot.

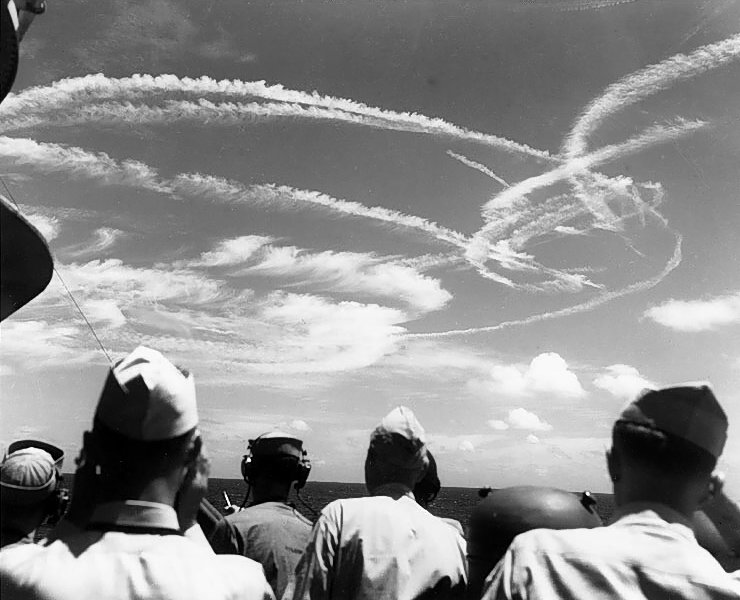
Contrails streak the sky during the defense of Task Force 58 in the Battle of the Philippine Sea.

The fleet had recently completed operations in the Gilbert Islands, taking Tarawa in a bloody and costly invasion in the process. This mission was done for the purpose of obtaining a land base for aircraft to support naval operations against the next objective, the Marshall Islands. The idea that land-based air support was necessary to successfully conduct an amphibious operation was traditional doctrine. The Marshalls would be the first key step in the Navy's march across the Pacific to reach Japan. Mitscher's objective was to weaken Japanese air defenses in the Marshalls and limit their capability of flying in reinforcements, in preparation for a U.S. invasion of the Marshalls, code named Operation Flintlock. Intelligence estimates of the Japanese defenders of the Marshall Islands believed they had approximately 150 aircraft at their disposal. Two days before the intended landings Mitscher's task groups approached to within 150 miles (240 km) of the Marshalls and launched their air strikes, fighters first to soften up the defenders, followed by bombers to destroy ground emplacements, buildings, supplies, and the defenders' airfields. It was thought it would take two days to attain air superiority. Though the Japanese battled briskly, they lost control of the skies over the Marshall Islands by noon of the first day. What came next was an aerial bombardment of the Japanese defenses, followed by a naval bombardment from the big guns of Spruance's surface force. The two days of destruction saved a great many lives of the Marines that were landed. The Japanese were estimated to have lost 155 aircraft. Mitscher's task force lost 57 aircraft, from which 31 pilots and 32 crewmen were lost. But the manner in which the fast carrier task force was employed established a pattern for future Pacific operations. In his summary report for the month of January, Admiral Nimitz commented it was "typical of what may be expected in the future."

Next, Mitscher led Task Force 58 in a raid against Truk, Satawan, and Ponape (February 17–18). This was a big step up. The idea of purposely sailing into the range of a major Japanese naval and air base brought great unease to Mitscher's airmen. Said one: "They announced our destination over the loudspeaker once we were underway. It was Truk. I nearly jumped overboard." But Mitscher felt confident they could succeed. As tactical commander of the striking force, he developed techniques that would help give his airmen the edge of surprise. In Operation Hailstone, Mitscher's forces approached Truk from behind a weather front to launch a daybreak raid that caught many of the defenders off guard. The airmen brought devastation to the heavily defended base, destroying 72 aircraft on the ground and another 56 in the air, while a great number of auxiliary vessels and three warships were sunk in the lagoon. Chuckling over the pre-raid fears, Mitscher commented, "All I knew about Truk was what I'd read in the National Geographic."

Through the spring of 1944 Task Force 58 conducted a series of raids on Japanese air bases across the Western Pacific, first in the Mariana and Palau Islands, followed by a raid against Japanese bases in the Hollandia area. These attacks demonstrated that the air power of Task Force 58 was great enough to overwhelm the air defenses of not just a single island air base, or several bases on an island, but the air bases of several island groups at one time. The long-held naval rule that fleet operations could not be conducted in the face of land-based air power was brushed aside.

In the ensuing year Mitscher's aviators attacked Japanese carrier forces in the Battle of the Philippine Sea—also known as the "Great Marianas Turkey Shoot"—during June 1944. When a very long-range U.S. Navy follow-up strike had to return to their carriers in darkness, Mitscher ordered all the carriers' flight deck landing lights turned on, risking submarine attack to give his aviators the best chance of being recovered.

On 26 August 1944, when Admiral William Halsey relieved Admiral Raymond Spruance as the fleet commander, the ships of the Fifth Fleet became the Third Fleet, and the subordinate Fast Carrier Task Force 58 became Task Force 38. The re-designated task force remained commanded by Vice Admiral Marc Mitscher. Mitscher requested that he retain command of the Fast Carrier Task Force until his replacement, Vice Admiral John S. McCain Sr., could have proper time to become more familiar with the handling of a carrier task force. After the Battle of Leyte Gulf of 23–26 October 1944, Mitscher went on shore leave and planning duty, and Vice Admiral McCain took over as commanding officer of TF 38, which continued under Halsey and the Third Fleet.

One of the most unfortunate events of the Pacific war occurred on the morning of 21 September 1944, when spotter planes from one of TF 38's carriers came across the MATA-27 convoy and a full-scale attack soon was launched. All eleven ships were sunk, including the Toyofuku Maru, which received direct hits from two aerial torpedoes and three bombs, sinking within five minutes; unfortunately, the Toyofuku Maru was carrying Dutch and British prisoners of war below decks, of which 1,047 drowned. This was learned only after the war's end.

=== Facing the kamikaze threat ===
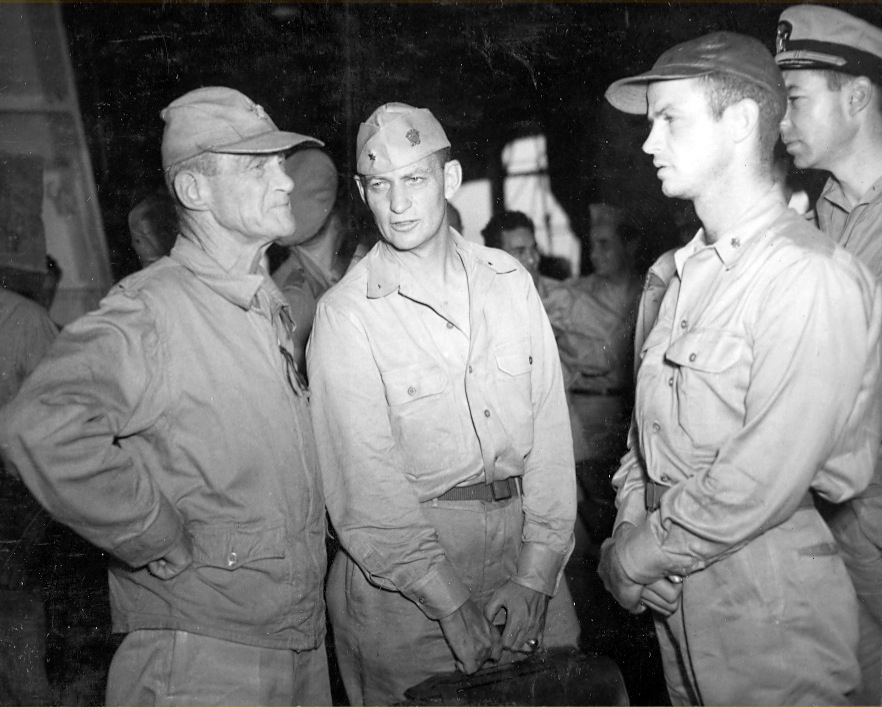
Admiral Mitscher and chief of staff Arleigh Burke transfer to Enterprise after Bunker Hill was hit twice by kamikazes

During 1944 and 1945, Vice Admiral Mitscher's fast carriers, whether designated Task Force 38 or Task Force 58, spearheaded the thrust against the heart of the Empire of Japan, covering successively the invasion of the Palaus, the liberation of the Philippines, and the conquests of Iwo Jima and Okinawa. On 26 January 1945, the Third Fleet again became the Fifth Fleet. During the Okinawa operation there was a weather-caused delay in the Army preparing serviceable air bases. To provide essential air support to the intense ground operations, Mitscher was obliged to keep then-Task Force 58 sailing in a box on station some 60 miles (97 km) east of Okinawa, often in stormy weather and heavy seas, for the next two months. During this time they were subject to air attack around the clock, and the psychological pressures of warding off these attacks were enormous. Rarely did a night go by that all the ships' crews were not called to general quarters, and the days were worse. Mitscher won his second Navy Cross for the critical success of TF 38 over the period of October 22–30, 1944, both away from and also in direct support of the Battle of Leyte Gulf. He won his third Navy Cross for the critical success of TF 58 over the period of January 27 – May 27, 1945, both away from and also in direct support of the battles of Iwo Jima and Okinawa.

On 11 May 1945, Mitscher and his chief of staff Commodore Arleigh Burke were yards away from getting killed or wounded by kamikazes on his flagship Bunker Hill, which killed three of Mitscher's staff officers and eleven of his enlisted staff members and also destroyed his flag cabin along with all of his uniforms, personal papers, and possessions. Mitscher was forced to shift his command to Enterprise. Enterprise at that time was functioning as a "night carrier," launching and recovering her aircraft in the dark to protect the fleet against land-based Japanese bomber and torpedo aircraft slipping in to attack the fleet in the relative safety of night. When Enterprise too was struck by a kamikaze attack, Mitscher had to transfer once more, this time to USS Randolph, the carrier that earlier had been damaged by a long-range kamikaze attack at Ulithi. Throughout this period Mitscher repeatedly led the fast carriers northward to attack air bases on the Japanese home islands. On 27 May 1945, Halsey for the last time relieved Spruance as fleet commander; the next day Vice Admiral John S. McCain relieved Vice Admiral Mitscher as Commander, Task Force 38. Commenting on Admiral Mitscher upon his return from the Okinawa campaign, Admiral Nimitz said, "He is the most experienced and most able officer in the handling of fast carrier task forces who has yet been developed. It is doubtful if any officer has made more important contributions than he toward extinction of the enemy fleet." Exhausted and ill after a heart attack, Mitscher went to Washington, D.C., to serve as Deputy Chief of Naval Operations for Air.

== Post-war ==
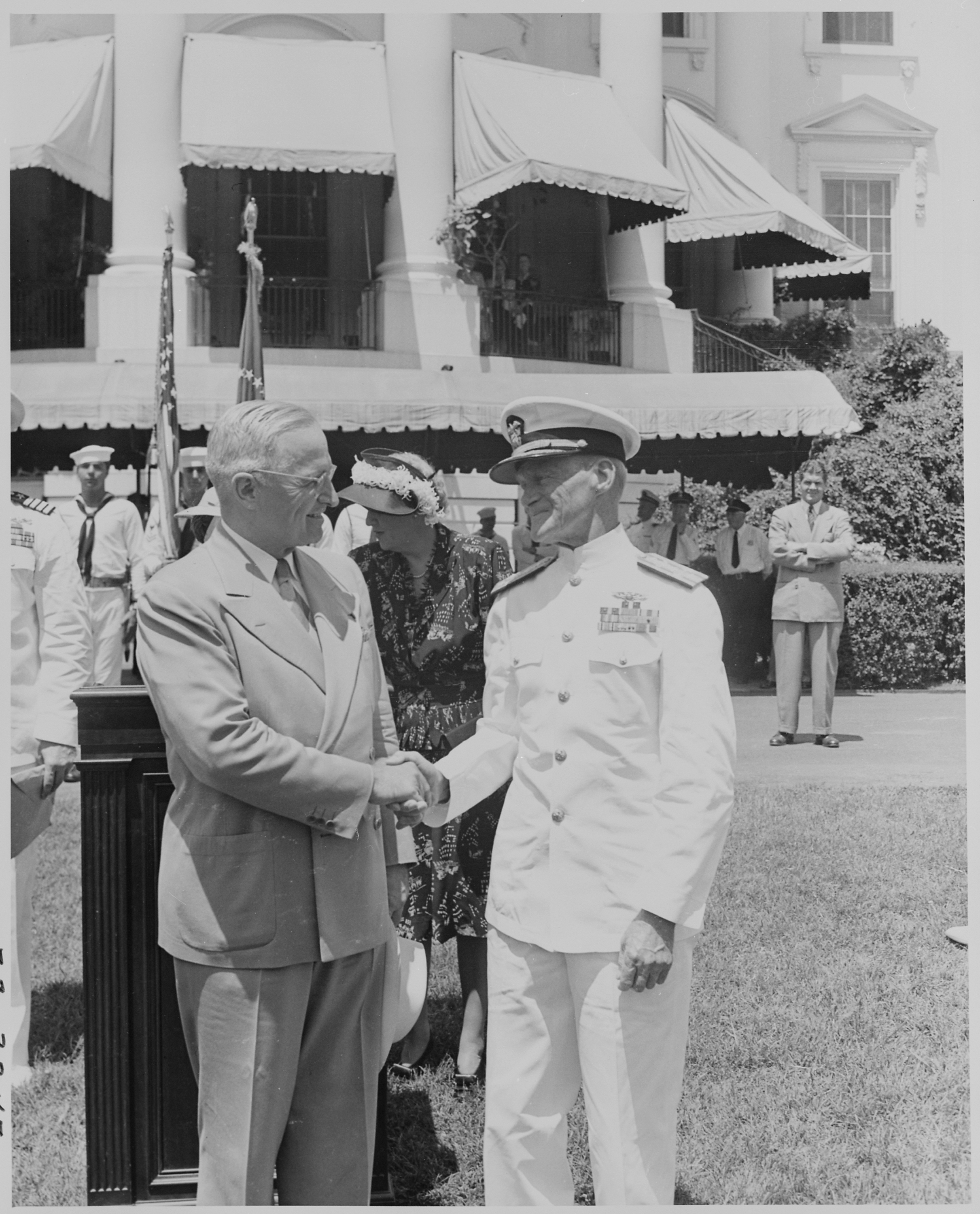
President Truman congratulates Mitscher during a ceremony in which eight U.S. carriers were awarded Presidential Unit Citations, July 16, 1946.

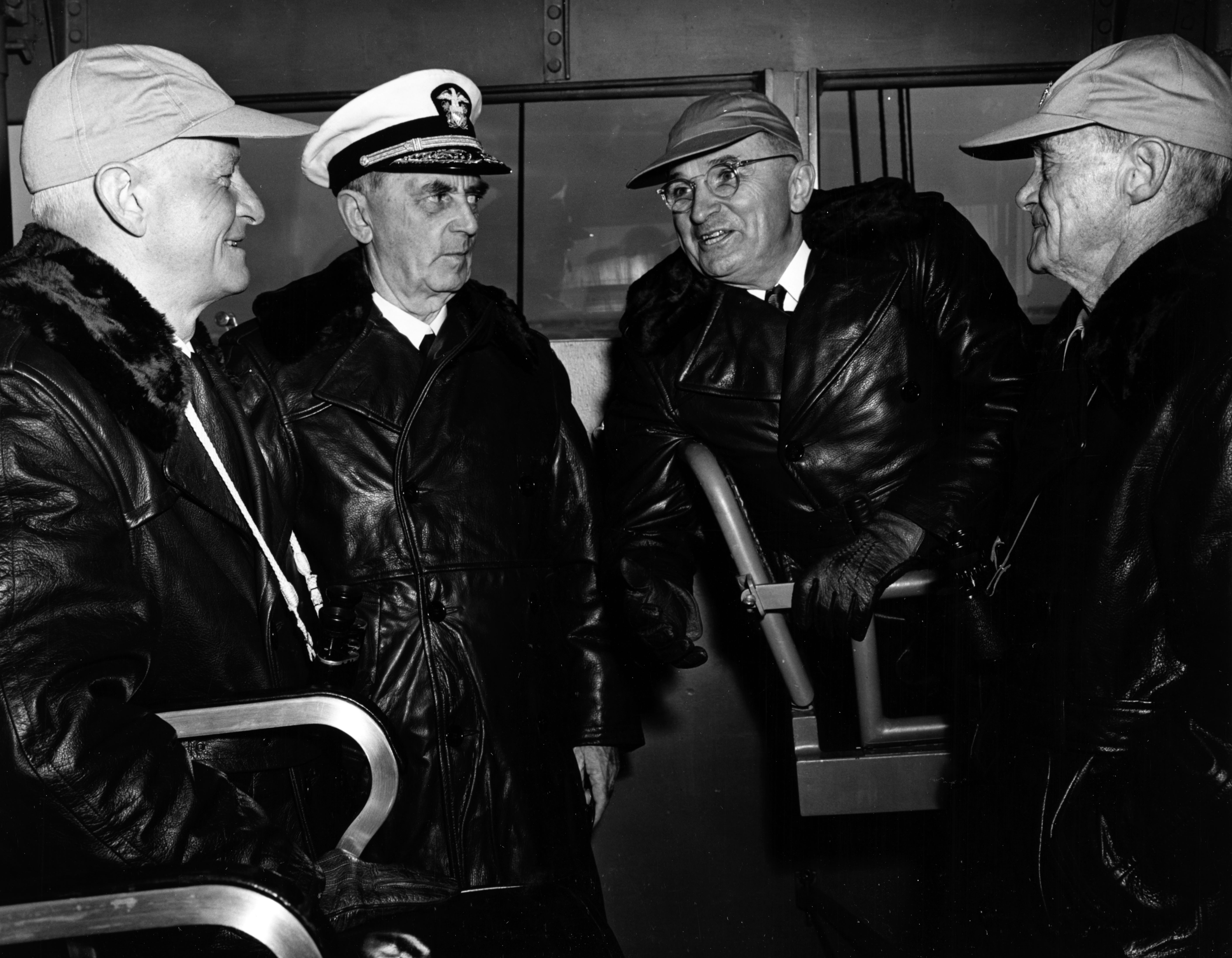
Fleet Admiral Chester W. Nimitz, Fleet Admiral William D. Leahy, President Harry S. Truman, and Vice Admiral Marc A. Mitscher on the bridge of the USS Franklin D. Roosevelt (CV-42) during maneuvers off the Virginia Capes, 24 April 1946.

At the conclusion of World War II, and in the face of markedly reduced U.S. military spending, a political battle ensued in America over the need for, and the nature of, a post-war military, with advocates from the Army Air Forces insisting that with the development of the atomic bomb the nation could be defended by the devastating power that strategic bombers could deliver, thereby doing away with the need for Army or Navy forces. In their view, air assets in the Navy should be brought under the control of the soon-to-be-formed Air Force. In the face of such proposals Mitscher remained a staunch advocate for naval aviation, and went so far as to release the following statement to the press:

Japan is beaten, and carrier supremacy defeated her. Carrier supremacy destroyed her army and navy air forces. Carrier supremacy destroyed her fleet. Carrier supremacy gave us bases adjacent to her home islands, and carrier supremacy finally left her exposed to the most devastating air attack – the atomic fission bomb – that man has suffered.

When I say carrier supremacy defeated Japan, I do not mean air power in itself won the Battle of the Pacific. We exercised our carrier supremacy as part of a balanced, integrated air-surface-ground team, in which all hands may be proud of the roles assigned them and the way in which their duties were discharged. This could not have been done by a separate air force, exclusively based ashore, or by one not under Navy control.

By July 1946, when he was serving as Deputy Chief of Naval Operations (Air), Mitscher received, among other awards, two Gold Stars signifying his second and third Navy Cross and the Distinguished Service Medal with two Gold Stars.

He served briefly as commander 8th Fleet and on 26 September 1946 became Commander-in-Chief, U.S. Atlantic Fleet, with the rank of admiral.

While in that assignment, Mitscher died on 3 February 1947 at the age of 60 of a coronary thrombosis at Norfolk, Virginia. He was buried in Arlington National Cemetery.

== Mitscher's style as military commander ==
Though reserved and quiet, Mitscher possessed a natural authority. He could check a man with a single question. He was intolerant of incompetence and would relieve officers who were not making the grade, but was lenient with what he would consider honest mistakes. Harsh discipline, he believed, ruined more men than it made. He was not forgetful of the abuse he took at the Naval Academy. He believed pilots could not be successfully handled with rigid discipline, as what made for a good pilot was an independence that inflexible discipline destroyed. At the same time he was insistent on rigid "air discipline" and he would break a man who violated it.

=== Naval aviation tactics ===
Before most other officers in the high command of the U.S. Navy, Mitscher had a grasp of the potential sudden, destructive power that air groups represented. The change in the operation of carriers from single or paired carriers with support vessels to task groups of three or four carriers was a Mitscher concept, which he implemented for the purpose of concentrating the fighter aircraft available for a better air defense of the carriers.

Offensively, Mitscher trained his air groups to engage in air attacks which delivered a maximum destructive force upon the enemy with the least amount of loss to his aviators. He sought well coordinated attacks. In a typical Mitscher-style air attack, fighter aircraft would come at the targets first, strafing the enemy ships to suppress their defensive anti-aircraft fire. In plain terms he intended his fighter pilots to wound or kill the target ship's anti-aircraft gun crews. Following the fighter runs, the ordnance-carrying aircraft would execute bombing and torpedo runs, preferably simultaneously to overburden the ship's defenses and negate evasive maneuvers. The attack would be completed in a few minutes. Once the attack was delivered the air groups would leave, as suddenly as they had arrived.

=== Leadership ===
Mitscher's command style was one of few words. His small frame belied the authority he carried. A raised eyebrow was all he needed to indicate he was not pleased with the effort of one of his officers. He was not patient with incompetent personnel, yet he was forgiving of what he considered "honest" mistakes, and would allow airmen a second chance when other officers would have washed them out. He placed tremendous value on his pilots and had great respect for the risks they were willing to accept in attacking the enemy. His practice was for the flight leaders of the air groups of the carrier he was commanding from to come up to the flag bridge and report following the completion of their missions. He valued greatly the information he received from the men who had been in the air on the scene. He was devoted to these men, and made a great effort to recover as many downed aircrew as possible. One place this was demonstrated was at the Battle of the Philippine Sea, where he ordered the fleet flight decks illuminated so pilots returning in the dark and very low on fuel (many aircraft had to ditch into the sea) would have a better chance of finding the carriers, despite the risk from enemy submarines. He hated to lose a man, either adrift at sea, or worse, captured by the Japanese. Having spent time adrift on a downed aircraft himself, he was always deeply distressed that the numbers of rescued airmen were not higher.

=== Personality ===
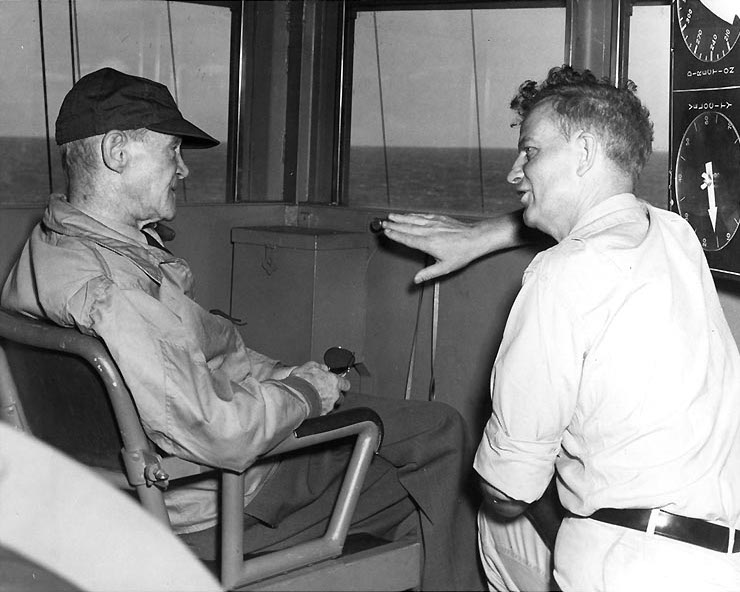
Mitscher and Arleigh Burke confer aboard USS Randolph during the Okinawa campaign.

Mitscher was a quiet man. He rarely spoke, never engaged in small talk and would never discuss mission details at the mess table. On the rare occasions when he would enter into conversation it would be about fishing, the love of which he picked up in his middle years. Mitscher relaxed by reading cheap murder mysteries, and when at sea he would always have one with him. Though he appeared distant and severe, Mitscher possessed a dry sense of humor and held a deep affection for his men. Once when a destroyer came alongside to refuel from their carrier, Mitscher took the opportunity to gently rib his chief of staff, Captain Arleigh Burke. Burke had come to Mitscher from destroyers, and preferred a fighting command over his new role as chief of staff. To the Marine sentry standing nearby, Mitscher ordered "Secure Captain Burke, till that destroyer casts off."

=== Relations toward superior officers ===
Mitscher had tactical control of Task Force 58/38 and directed its subordinate task groups. Strategic control was held by Spruance or Halsey. While Spruance granted his subordinates great authority, Halsey exercised much tighter control, such that commander, Third Fleet, was for all practical purposes commander, Task Force 38 as well; this was clearly and repeatedly seen in the battle of Leyte Gulf. But however much he may have disagreed with an order, once a decision was made by either of his superiors, Mitscher would implement the decision without complaint. This was most prominently exemplified in the last two major naval battles of the war: the Battle of the Philippine Sea and the Battle of Leyte Gulf. In each case Mitscher recommended a course of action which differed sharply from the one subsequently ordered by his fleet commander. In each case, once the order was given, Mitscher set about executing the order without further debate or protest.

Nevertheless, late in the war, Mitscher did preempt U.S. Fifth Fleet commander Admiral Raymond Spruance in stopping a Japanese naval sortie, centered on the super-battleship Yamato, from reaching Okinawa. Upon receiving contact reports from submarines Threadfin and Hackleback early on 7 April 1945, Spruance ordered Task Force 54, which consisted of older Standard-type battleships under the command of Rear Admiral Morton Deyo (and which were then engaged in shore bombardment of Okinawa), to prepare to intercept and destroy the Japanese sortie. Deyo began to plan how to execute his orders. Mitscher, however, preempted using the American battleship force by launching on his own initiative a massive air strike from his three carrier task groups then in range of the Japanese surface formation—without informing Spruance until after the launches were completed. As a senior naval aviation officer, "Mitscher had spent a career fighting the battleship admirals who had steered the navy's thinking for most of [that] century. One of those was his immediate superior, Raymond Spruance. Mitscher [may have] felt a stirring of battleship versus aircraft carrier rivalry. Though the carriers had mostly fought the great battles of the Pacific, whether air power alone could prevail over a surface force had not been proven beyond all doubt. Here was an opportunity to end the debate forever." After being informed of Mitscher's launches, Spruance agreed that the air strikes could go ahead as planned. As a contingency should the air strikes not be successful, Spruance planned to assemble a force of six new fast battleships (South Dakota, Massachusetts, Indiana, New Jersey, Wisconsin, and Missouri), together with seven cruisers (including the newly-arrived large cruisers Alaska and Guam), escorted by 21 destroyers, and to prepare for a surface engagement with Yamato. Mitscher's air strikes sank Yamato, light cruiser Yahagi, and four destroyers (the other four fled back to Japanese ports), at the cost of ten aircraft and twelve aircrew lost.

== Legacy ==
Two ships of the Navy have been named USS Mitscher in his honor: the post-World War II frigate, USS Mitscher (DL-2), later re-designated as the guided-missile destroyer (DDG-35), and the currently serving Arleigh Burke-class guided-missile destroyer, USS Mitscher (DDG-57).

The airfield and a street at Marine Corps Air Station Miramar (formerly Naval Air Station Miramar) were also named in his honor (Mitscher Field and Mitscher Way).

Mitscher Hall at the United States Naval Academy houses chaplain offices, meeting rooms, and an auditorium.

In 1989, Mitscher was inducted into the International Air & Space Hall of Fame at the San Diego Air & Space Museum.

The words of Admiral Arleigh Burke, his wartime chief of staff, provides tribute and recognition of his leadership:

"He spoke in a low voice and used few words. Yet, so great was his concern for his people—for their training and welfare in peacetime and their rescue in combat—that he was able to obtain their final ounce of effort and loyalty, without which he could not have become the preeminent carrier force commander in the world. A bulldog of a fighter, a strategist blessed with an uncanny ability to foresee his enemy's next move, and a lifelong searcher after truth and trout streams, he was above all else—perhaps above all other—a Naval Aviator."

The character Pete Richards, played by Walter Brennan, in the 1949 film Task Force is loosely based on Mitscher.

== Awards and decorations ==
Ribbon bar of Admiral Mitscher:

| Badge | Naval Aviator Badge | | |
| 1st Row | Navy Cross with two gold stars | | |
| 2nd Row | Navy Distinguished Service Medal with two gold stars | Legion of Merit with "V" Device | Presidential Unit Citation with two stars |
| 3rd Row | Mexican Campaign Medal | World War I Victory Medal with "Escort" Clasp | American Defense Service Medal with "A" device |
| 4th Row | American Campaign Medal | Asiatic-Pacific Campaign Medal with one silver and three bronze service stars | World War II Victory Medal |
| 5th Row | Philippine Liberation Medal with two stars | Companion of the Order of the Bath (United Kingdom) | Commander of the Order of the Tower and Sword (Portugal) |

== See also ==
- List of military figures by nickname
