= Thomas J. Shear =

American politician

Thomas J. Shear was a member of the Wisconsin State Assembly.

== Biography ==
Shear was born on September 25, 1836, in Concord, New York. He moved to Hillsboro (town), Wisconsin, in 1858. During the American Civil War, Shear served with the 47th Wisconsin Volunteer Infantry Regiment of the Union Army. He died in 1901.

Shear's son, Byron D. Shear, and son-in-law, Oscar A. Mitscher, both became Mayor of Oklahoma City, Oklahoma. His grandson, Marc Mitscher, became an admiral in the United States Navy.

== Political career ==
Shear was a member of the Assembly during the 1882 and 1889 sessions. Additionally, he was the clerk of Hillsboro and the superintendent of schools of Vernon County, Wisconsin. He was a Republican.

== See also ==
- Thomas J. Shear at Find a Grave
