= Oscar A. Mitscher =

Mayor of Oklahoma City (1861–1926)

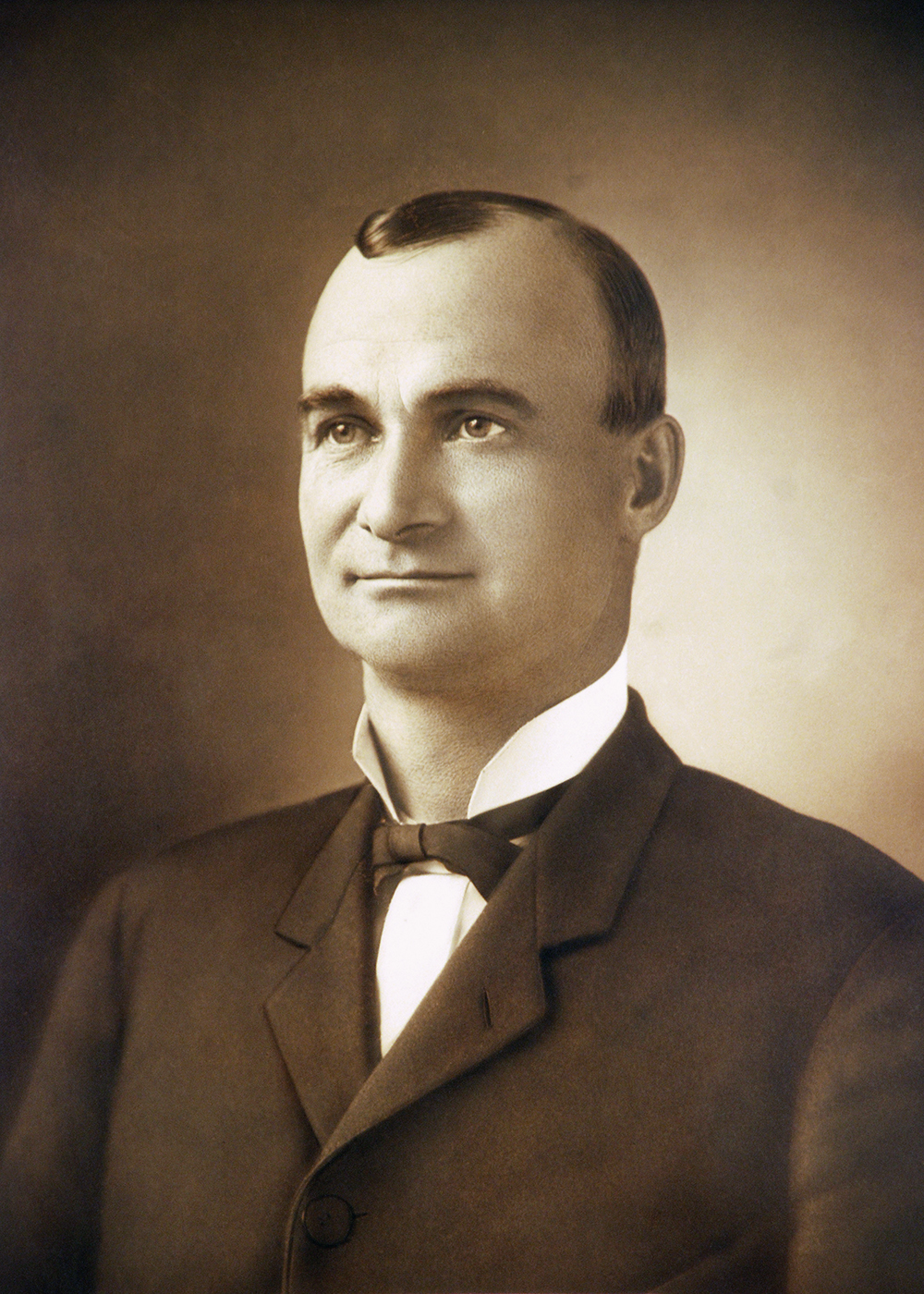

6th Mayor of Oklahoma City
- In office April 12, 1892 – April 9, 1894
- Preceded by: William James Gault
- Succeeded by: Nelson Button

Personal details
- Born: June 7, 1861 Hillsboro, Wisconsin, US
- Died: July 24, 1926 (aged 65) Oklahoma City, Oklahoma, US
- Party: Republican
- Spouse: Myrta Viola Shear
- Children: 3, including Marc Mitscher
- Relatives: Thomas J. Shear (father-in-law); Byron D. Shear (brother-in-law)

Oscar Augustus Mitscher (June 7, 1861 – July 24, 1926) was a participant in the Oklahoma Land Run of 1889. After settling in Oklahoma Territory, he established a merchandising company, and became Mayor of Oklahoma City from 1892 to 1894, the Territorial Period before statehood. He was better known as the father of U.S. Navy Admiral Marc Mitscher, who was notable in the U.S. effort to defeat the Japanese Navy in World War II.

== Early years in Oklahoma ==
Oscar Augustus Mitscher was born on June 7, 1861, in Hillsboro, Wisconsin. Very little about his early life has been published, other than that his parents were immigrants to Wisconsin from Germany, named Andreas Mitscher and Constantina Mohn. apparently moved to Oklahoma City in 1889, located in what was then known as Indian Territory. (Note: Oklahoma City became part of Oklahoma Territory when Congress passed the Organic Act in 1890.) In 1900, President William McKinley appointed Mitscher as the U.S. Agent for the Osage Nation, which had already been moved to a reservation within the new territory. His new post was located at the present-day community of Pawhuska, Oklahoma.

Oscar married Myrta Viola Shear and had three children. Their son, Marc Mitscher, became an admiral in the United States Navy. The Shear family also lived in Hillsboro, Wisconsin, and made the Land Run of 1889. Byron D. Shear, Myrta's brother, also became a mayor of Oklahoma City. Her father, Thomas J. Shear, was a member of the Wisconsin State Assembly. Oscar A. Mitscher died on July 24, 1926.

== Family ==
Oscar and Myrta had three children: Marc A. (1887 - 1947); Zoe Mitscher Hoevel (1887 - 1966); and Thomas Oscar (1895 - 1955).

- Zoe was born in Wisconsin and came to Oklahoma with her parents for the Run of 1889. She married Hugo Henry Hoevel, who formerly lived in Tulsa, before moving to Okmulgee, where he owned and operated the Hotel Belmont for eight years. He predeceased Zoe, dying of a heart attack in 1950. Hugo and Zoe had a son, Kenneth, who survived them.

== Political career ==
Mitscher was mayor from 1892 to 1894, before Oklahoma became a state. He was a Republican.

== Electoral history ==
Oklahoma Corporation Commission Republican primary (August 4, 1908)
Party	Candidate	Votes	%
Republican	William H. Reynolds	14,233	51.0%
Republican	Oscar A. Mitscher	13,625	48.9%
Turnout		27,858	
