= Trippville, Wisconsin =

- Unincorporated community
- Location within Wisconsin Location within the United States
- Coordinates: 43°42′33″N 90°24′15″W
- Country: United States
- State: Wisconsin
- County: Vernon
- Elevation: 1,066 ft (325 m)
- Time zone: UTC-6 (Central (CST))
  - Summer (DST): UTC-5 (CDT)
- Area code: 608
- GNIS feature ID: 1577857

Trippville is an unincorporated community in the town of Hillsboro, Vernon County, Wisconsin, United States. The community was named for Dier Tripp, who became the first postmaster in 1867.
