= David C. Yakey =

American politician

Member of the Wisconsin State Assembly from the Vernon 2nd district
- In office January 5, 1880 – January 3, 1881
- Preceded by: Roger Williams
- Succeeded by: Allen Rusk

Personal details
- Born: May 31, 1830 Loudoun County, Virginia, U.S.
- Died: February 23, 1908 (aged 77) Vernon County, Wisconsin, U.S.
- Resting place: Salem Ridge Cemetery, Avalanche, Wisconsin
- Party: Republican
- Spouse: Julia Ann Adams (m. 1867–1908)
- Children: 8
- Occupation: farmer

Military service
- Allegiance: United States
- Branch/service: United States Army; Union Army
- Years of service: 1862–1865
- Rank: Sergeant
- Unit: 25th Reg. Wis. Vol. Infantry
- Battles/wars: Dakota War of 1862; American Civil War: Siege of Vicksburg; Atlanta campaign; Savannah campaign; Carolinas campaign

David C. Yakey (May 13, 1830 – February 23, 1908) was an American farmer and Union Army volunteer in the American Civil War. He later served one term in the Wisconsin State Assembly.

== Early life and career ==
Yakey was born on May 31, 1830, in Loudoun County, Virginia, but at age 2 moved with his parents to Ohio. He grew up in Muskingum County and Perry County, where his father owned a farm. In 1856, he came to Wisconsin, settling in Vernon County (then known as "Bad Ax County"). He was employed as a teacher for several years—one of the first teachers in southwest Wisconsin—and in 1861 was elected superintendent of schools for the town of Clinton. However, shortly thereafter, he enlisted for service in the American Civil War.

== Civil War service ==
Yakey joined up with a company of volunteers and proceeded to Camp Salomon in La Crosse, Wisconsin, where they became Company A of the 25th Wisconsin Infantry Regiment. The 25th Wisconsin mustered into service September 14, 1862, and were ordered to proceed west and report to General John Pope in Minnesota to assist in the ongoing Sioux uprising.

After brief service in Minnesota, the regiment was ordered south to attach to XVI Corps for service in the Western Theater of the American Civil War. They joined the Siege of Vicksburg from June through July 1863, and were then assigned to guard duty in eastern Kansas. The regiment suffered from a severe wave of disease during this summer, and ultimately lost over 400 men to illness.

In February 1864, they returned to Mississippi, and, in May, they joined General William T. Sherman's Atlanta campaign. They remained with Sherman's army through the subsequent Savannah campaign and Carolinas campaign. With the war ended, the regiment returned to Washington, D.C., where they participated in the Grand Review of the Armies. Yakey mustered out with the rank of sergeant, July 11, 1865.

== Postbellum career ==
After the war, in 1866, Yakey settled on a farm in the town of Clinton, in Vernon County, where he lived until his death. He served on the Clinton town board and the Vernon County board at various times. In 1879 he was elected to the Wisconsin State Assembly on the Republican ticket.

== Personal life and family ==
Yakey married Julia Ann Adams in 1867. They had 8 children together. Yakey died on February 23, 1908, in Vernon County.

== Electoral history ==
Wisconsin Assembly, Vernon 2nd District Election, 1879
Party	Candidate	Votes	%	±%
General Election, November 4, 1879
Republican	David C. Yakey	977	62.51%	+8.73%
Greenback	G. W. Gregory	387	24.76%	−21.47%
Democratic	Henry O'Connell	199	12.73%	
Plurality		590	37.75%	+30.20%
Total votes		1,563	100.0%	-8.54%
Republican hold				

Wisconsin State Assembly
Preceded by Roger Williams	Member of the Wisconsin State Assembly from the Vernon 2nd district January 5, 1880 – January 3, 1881	Succeeded by Allen Rusk
