= Byron D. Shear =

American politician

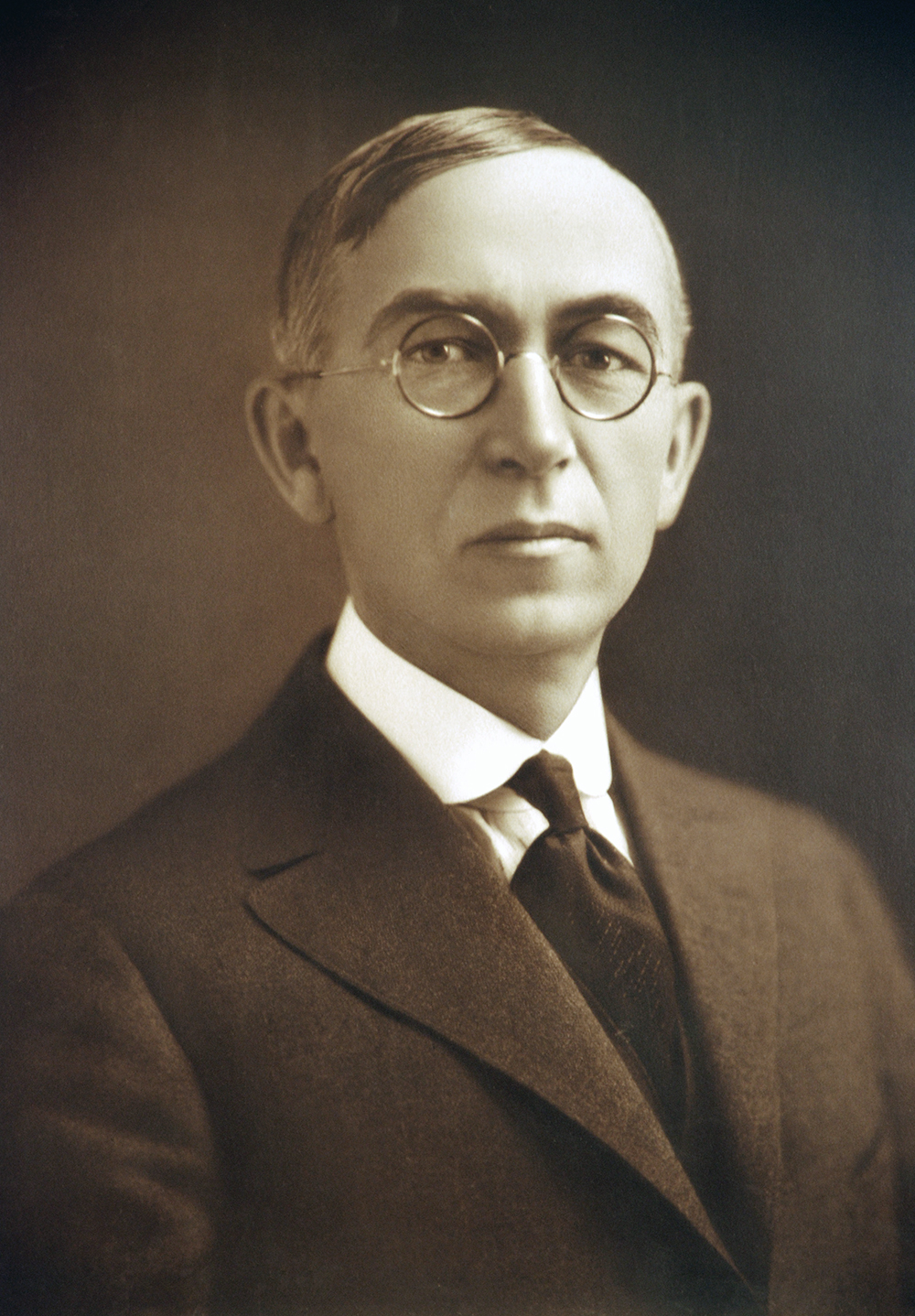

18th Mayor of Oklahoma City
- In office December 25, 1918 – April 7, 1919
- Preceded by: Ed Overholser
- Succeeded by: Jack C. Walton

Personal details
- Born: May 12, 1869 Hillsboro, Wisconsin
- Died: June 9, 1929 (aged 60) Oklahoma City, U.S.
- Party: Republican

Byron Delos Shear (May 12, 1869 – June 9, 1929) was an American politician who served as mayor of Oklahoma City, Oklahoma, in the 1910s.

== Biography ==
Shear was born on May 12, 1869, in Hillsboro, Wisconsin, conflicting reports have been given on the exact date. His father, Thomas J. Shear, was a member of the Wisconsin State Assembly. In 1892, Shear married Hulda Ludwig. She died in 1901. He married Ida Malinda Cunningham. Shear's brother-in-law, Oscar A. Mitscher, was also mayor of Oklahoma City, and his nephew, Marc Mitscher, was an admiral in the United States Navy. He died on June 9, 1929.

== Career ==
Shear was mayor from December 25, 1918, until April 7, 1919. Additionally, he was a delegate to the 1924 Republican National Convention. He succeeded Ed Overholser and preceded Jack C. Walton as mayor.
