= Henry H. Wyatt =

American politician

Henry H. Wyatt (born November 10, 1840) in Streetsboro, Ohio, was an American politician. He was a member of the Wisconsin State Assembly. During the American Civil War, he served with the 2nd California Infantry Regiment and the 2nd Regiment of Cavalry, Massachusetts Volunteers of the Union Army. Conflicts he took part in include the Third Battle of Winchester, the Battle of Cedar Creek and the Battle of Five Forks. He died on 14 November 1909, in Kinross, Michigan at the age of 69.

== Assembly career ==
Wyatt was a member of the Assembly during the 1877 session. He was a Republican.
