= Hillsboro, Wisconsin =

- City
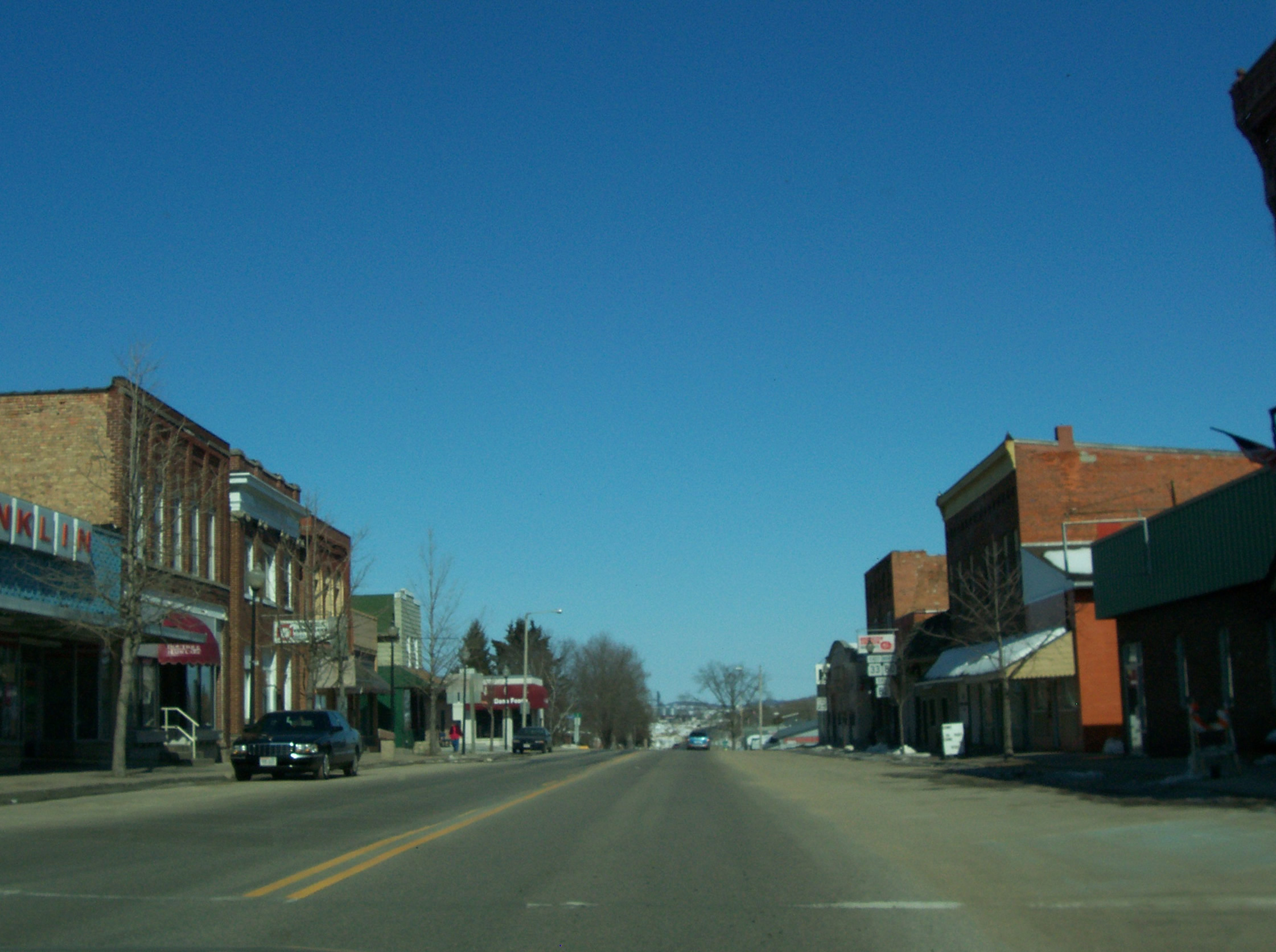
- Downtown Hillsboro

- Location of Hillsboro in Vernon County, Wisconsin.

- Location within Wisconsin Location within the United States
- Coordinates: 43°39′10″N 90°20′29″W
- Country: United States
- State: Wisconsin
- County: Vernon

Area
  - Total: 1.44 sq mi (3.74 km^{2})
  - Land: 1.41 sq mi (3.64 km^{2})
  - Water: 0.039 sq mi (0.10 km^{2})

Population (2020)
  - Total: 1,397
  - Density: 990/sq mi (384/km^{2})
- Time zone: UTC-6 (Central (CST))
  - Summer (DST): UTC-5 (CDT)
- Area code: 608
- FIPS code: 55-34825
- Website: www.hillsborowi.com

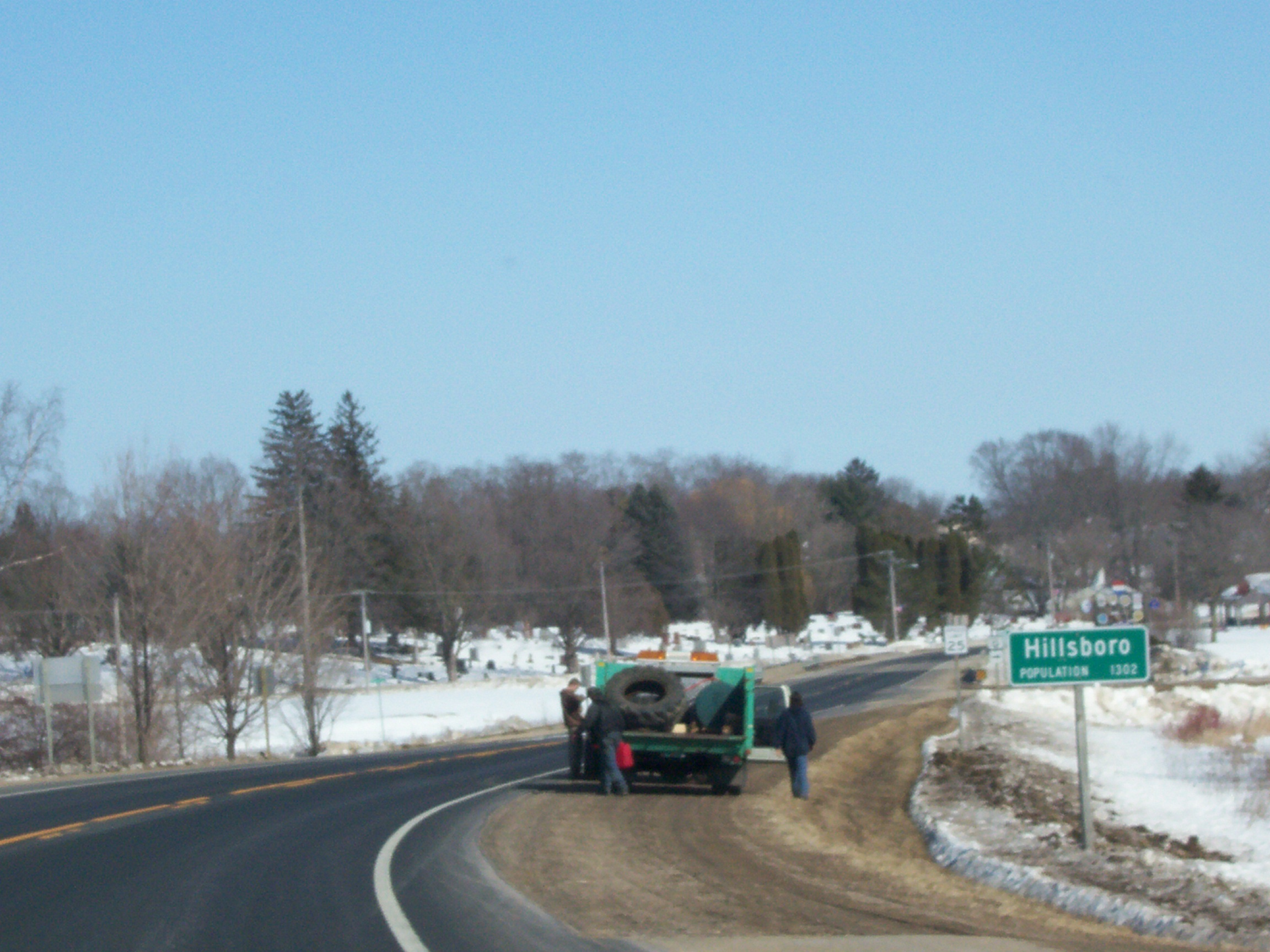
Sign for Hillsboro

Hillsboro is a city in Vernon County, Wisconsin, United States. The population was 1,397 at the 2020 Census. The city is located within the Town of Hillsboro.

== Geography ==
Hillsboro is located at 43°39′10″N 90°20′28″W (43.652843, -90.34133), along the West Branch of the Baraboo River.

According to the United States Census Bureau, the city has a total area of 1.44 square miles (3.73 km^{2}), of which 1.41 square miles (3.65 km^{2}) is land and 0.04 square miles (0.10 km^{2}) is water.

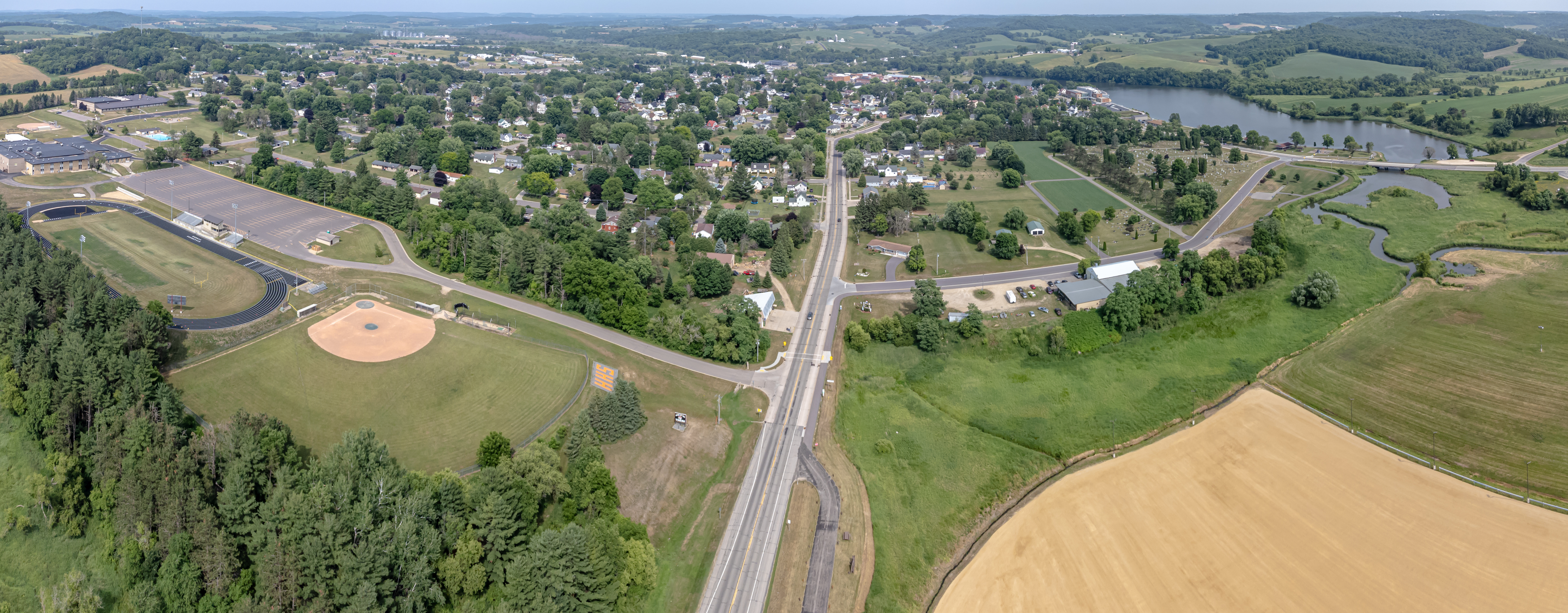

== Demographics ==
Historical population
Census	Pop.	Note	%±
1880	195		—
1890	461		136.4%
1900	785		70.3%
1910	804		2.4%
1920	950		18.2%
1930	972		2.3%
1940	1,146		17.9%
1950	1,341		17.0%
1960	1,366		1.9%
1970	1,231		−9.9%
1980	1,263		2.6%
1990	1,288		2.0%
2000	1,302		1.1%
2010	1,417		8.8%
2020	1,397		−1.4%
U.S. Decennial Census

=== 2010 census ===
As of the census of 2010, there were 1,417 people, 587 households, and 366 families living in the city. The population density was 1,034.3 inhabitants per square mile (399.3/km^{2}). There were 662 housing units at an average density of 483.2 per square mile (186.6/km^{2}). The racial makeup of the city was 98.0% White, 0.2% African American, 0.3% Asian, 0.4% from other races, and 1.1% from two or more races. Hispanic or Latino of any race were 2.3% of the population.

There were 587 households, of which 32.9% had children under the age of 18 living with them, 46.8% were married couples living together, 11.1% had a female householder with no husband present, 4.4% had a male householder with no wife present, and 37.6% were non-families. 33.9% of all households were made up of individuals, and 19.1% had someone living alone who was 65 years of age or older. The average household size was 2.41 and the average family size was 3.10.

The median age in the city was 38.4 years. 26.9% of residents were under the age of 18; 7.1% were between the ages of 18 and 24; 23.7% were from 25 to 44; 24% were from 45 to 64; and 18.4% were 65 years of age or older. The gender makeup of the city was 48.1% male and 51.9% female.

=== 2000 census ===
As of the census of 2000, there were 1,302 people, 565 households, and 333 families living in the city. The population density was 1,086.6 people per square mile (418.9/km^{2}). There were 603 housing units at an average density of 503.2 per square mile (194.0/km^{2}). The racial makeup of the city was 99.23% White, 0.23% Native American, 0.15% from other races, and 0.38% from two or more races. 0.69% of the population were Hispanic or Latino of any race.

There were 565 households, out of which 24.1% had children under the age of 18 living with them, 48.3% were married couples living together, 8.8% had a female householder with no husband present, and 40.9% were non-families. 37.3% of all households were made up of individuals, and 21.6% had someone living alone who was 65 years of age or older. The average household size was 2.18 and the average family size was 2.86.

In the city, the population was spread out, with 21.2% under the age of 18, 7.1% from 18 to 24, 24.1% from 25 to 44, 20.1% from 45 to 64, and 27.5% who were 65 years of age or older. The median age was 43 years. For every 100 females, there were 81.8 males. For every 100 females age 18 and over, there were 77.2 males.

The median income for a household in the city was $30,543, and the median income for a family was $42,750. Males had a median income of $30,700 versus $20,792 for females. The per capita income for the city was $16,005. About 6.3% of families and 9.2% of the population were below the poverty line, including 6.4% of those under age 18 and 14.7% of those age 65 or over.

== Transportation ==
The city's airport, Joshua Sanford Field airport (KHBW) closed in August 2016; it served Hillsboro and the surrounding communities.

== Notable people ==
- Dick Cepek, off-road rider
- Bernard J. Liska, food science
- Marc Mitscher, admiral
- Oscar A. Mitscher, politician
- Byron D. Shear, politician
- Denny Sullivan, baseball outfielder over parts of five seasons
