= Hillsboro (town), Wisconsin =

Town in Wisconsin, United States

Hillsboro, Wisconsin
- Town
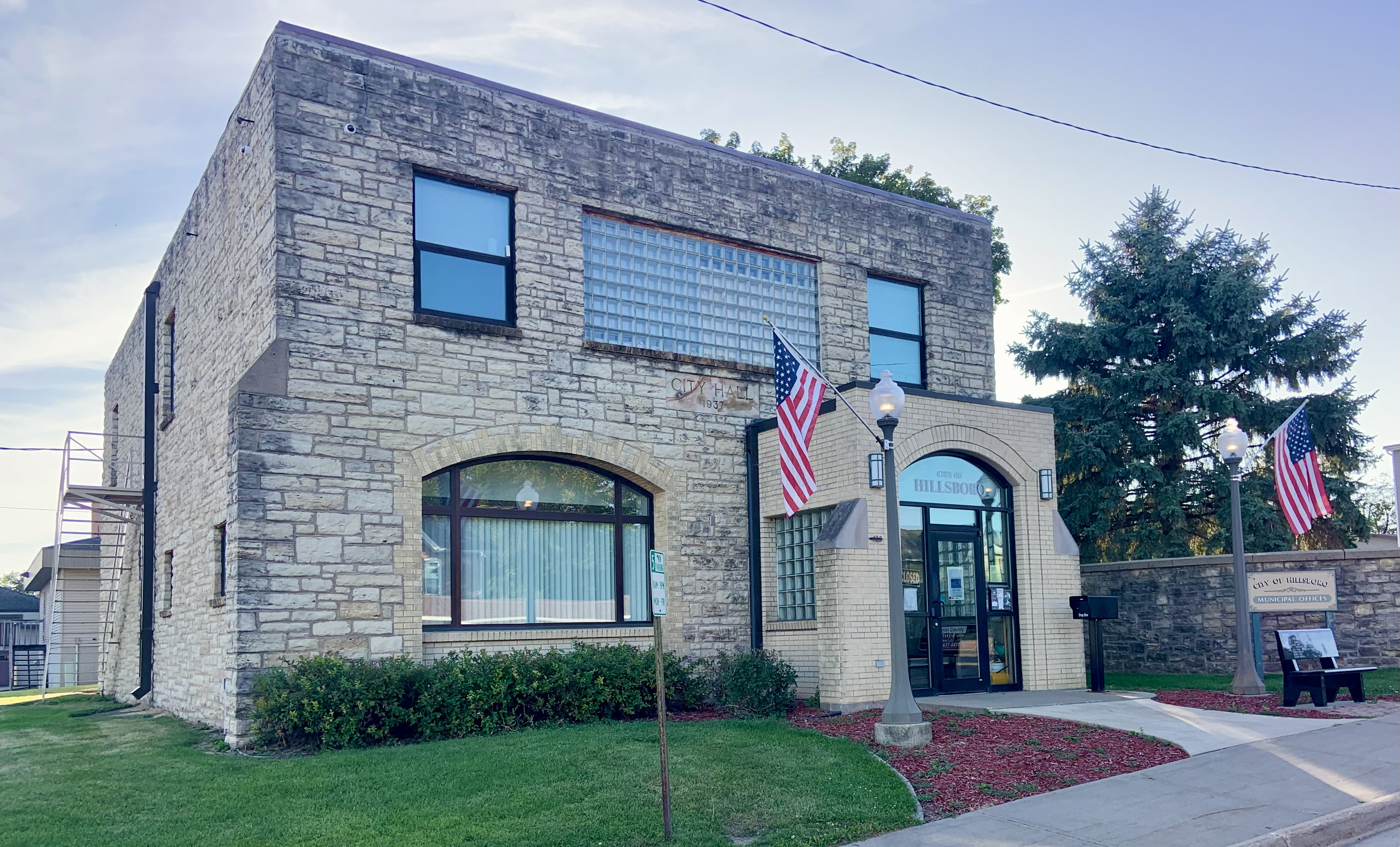
- Town hall and Hillsboro City Hall

- Location in Vernon County and the state of Wisconsin
- Coordinates: 43°40′47″N 90°21′37″W
- Country: United States
- State: Wisconsin
- County: Vernon

Area
  - Total: 35.6 sq mi (92.3 km^{2})
  - Land: 35.6 sq mi (92.2 km^{2})
  - Water: 0.039 sq mi (0.1 km^{2})
- Elevation: 1,138 ft (347 m)

Population (2020)
  - Total: 787
  - Density: 22.1/sq mi (8.54/km^{2})
- Time zone: UTC-6 (Central (CST))
  - Summer (DST): UTC-5 (CDT)
- Area code: 608
- FIPS code: 55-34850
- GNIS feature ID: 1583394

Hillsboro is a town in Vernon County, Wisconsin, United States. The population was 787 at the 2020 census. The City of Hillsboro is located within the town. The unincorporated community of Trippville is also located in the town.

== Geography ==
According to the United States Census Bureau, the town has a total area of 35.6 square miles (92.3 km^{2}), of which 35.6 square miles (92.2 km^{2}) is land and 0.04 square miles (0.1 km^{2}) (0.08%) is water.

== Demographics ==
At the 2000 census, there were 766 people, 285 households and 204 families residing in the town. The population density was 21.5 per square mile (8.3/km^{2}). There were 326 housing units at an average density of 9.2 per square mile (3.5/km^{2}). The racial makeup of the town was 98.04% White, 0.91% Black or African American, 0.13% Asian, 0.26% from other races, and 0.65% from two or more races. 0.91% of the population were Hispanic or Latino of any race.

There were 285 households, of which 29.1% had children under the age of 18 living with them, 62.5% were married couples living together, 4.2% had a female householder with no husband present, and 28.1% were non-families. 23.2% of all households were made up of individuals, and 11.9% had someone living alone who was 65 years of age or older. The average household size was 2.69 and the average family size was 3.24.

Age distribution was 28.7% under the age of 18, 6.9% from 18 to 24, 23.9% from 25 to 44, 24.2% from 45 to 64, and 16.3% who were 65 years of age or older. The median age was 40 years. For every 100 females, there were 104.3 males. For every 100 females age 18 and over, there were 101.5 males.

The median household income was $37,321, and the median family income was $41,118. Males had a median income of $27,708 versus $20,000 for females. The per capita income for the town was $15,967. About 10.7% of families and 18.9% of the population were below the poverty line, including 30.5% of those under age 18 and 20.3% of those age 65 or over.
