= Joshua Sanford Field =

Defunct airport

- IATA: none; ICAO: ~~KHBW~~; FAA LID: ~~HBW~~

Summary
- Airport type: Public
- Owner: City of Hillsboro
- Serves: Hillsboro, Wisconsin
- Closed: November 10, 2016
- Elevation AMSL: 938 ft (286 m)
- Coordinates: 43°39′24″N 090°19′41″W

Map
- Location of airport in Wisconsin, United States

Runways
Direction	Length		Surface
Direction	ft	m	Surface
5/23	3,070	936	Asphalt

Statistics
- Aircraft operations (2015): 1,405
- Based aircraft (2016): 7
- Source: Federal Aviation Administration

Joshua Sanford Field (ICAO: ~~KHBW~~, FAA LID: ~~HBW~~) was a public use airport located one nautical mile (2 km) northeast of the central business district of Hillsboro, a city in Vernon County, Wisconsin, United States. It was owned by the City of Hillsboro. The airport closed sometime in the fall of 2016, due to it being unsafe to operate from due to the nearby Land O'Lakes butter plant being expanded right off the runway threshold. The airport was no longer listed in the November 10, 2016 publication of the FAA Airport/Facility Directory.

Although many U.S. airports use the same three-letter location identifier for the FAA and IATA, this facility was assigned HBW by the FAA but had no designation from the IATA.

== Facilities and aircraft ==
Joshua Sanford Field covers an area of 16 acres (6 ha) at an elevation of 938 feet (286 m) above mean sea level. It has one runway designated 5/23 with an asphalt surface measuring 3,070 by 46 feet (936 x 14 m).

For the 12-month period ending June 9, 2015, the airport had 1,405 aircraft operations, an average of 117 per month: roughly 99% general aviation and >1% military. In September 2016, there were 7 aircraft based at this airport: All 7 single engine.

== Closing of the airport ==
The airport was closed because of the expansion of the Land O'Lakes butter plant, which is next to the airport. There were talks about transforming it into private members only airport. The airport would then shorten the runway to accommodate for the nearby obstacles. This plan failed when the FAA refused to allow the runway to be shortened.
