= Pei Plan =

1960s-1970s urban planning scheme for Oklahoma City

Coordinates: 35°28′08″N 97°31′14″W

The Pei Plan was an urban redevelopment initiative designed for downtown Oklahoma City, Oklahoma, United States, in the 1960s and 1970s. It is the informal name for two related commissions of noted architect and urban planner I. M. Pei — namely the Central Business District General Neighborhood Renewal Plan (design completed 1964) and the Central Business District Project I-A Development Plan (design completed 1966). It was formally adopted in 1965, and implemented in public and private phases throughout the 1960s and 1970s.

The plan called for the demolition of hundreds of antiquated downtown structures in favor of renewed parking, office building, and retail developments, in addition to public projects such as the Myriad Convention Center and the Myriad Botanical Gardens. It was the dominant template for downtown development in Oklahoma City from its inception through the 1970s, supported by Oklahoma City Mayor Patience Latting. The plan generated mixed results and opinion, largely succeeding in re-developing office building and parking infrastructure but failing to attract its anticipated retail and residential development. Public resentment also developed as a result of the destruction of multiple historic structures. As a result, Oklahoma City's leadership avoided large-scale urban planning for downtown throughout the 1980s and early 1990s, until the passage of the Metropolitan Area Projects (MAPS) initiative in 1993.

== Impetus for the plan: 1950s and 1960s ==
Similar to most urban areas in the post-World War II era, Oklahoma City experienced urban sprawl into outlying municipal and suburban areas in the 1940s and 1950s. At the same time, increased automobile traffic exhausted the limited parking availability in the Oklahoma City downtown area, a phenomenon which was exacerbated by the dismantling of the Oklahoma City Railway after World War II. In addition, real estate lots downtown — a holdover from the days of the Land Run of 1889 that settled the area — were too small to accommodate expanding business sizes. By 1962, 53 downtown retailers had closed or moved to the suburbs.

During the 1950s and early 1960s local Oklahoma City business leaders, including Dean A. McGee, Chamber of Commerce president Stanley Draper, and publisher E.K. Gaylord laid the groundwork for local and state laws authorizing land acquisitions for urban renewal. By 1962, the city council had authorized the creation of an Urban Renewal Authority, which received initial funding from local business leaders that hired architect I.M. Pei to design a comprehensive redevelopment proposal.

At the time, I.M. Pei had received international recognition for urban redesign plans for Cleveland, Ohio and Philadelphia, among others.

== Original plan ==
I.M. Pei developed his plan for the 528-acre (2.14 km^{2}) Central Business District through 1964, initially disclosing it only to Urban Renewal Authority principals and principals of the related but privately financed Urban Action Foundation. Pei's plan called for the demolition of hundreds of buildings to form "superblocks" that could house large-scale development. Included in the plan were new parking garages (increasing available spaces from the then-available 14,300 to 28,360), a new street grid converting Robinson, Reno, and Sheridan (formerly Grand) Avenue into one-way streets, a new convention center, planned spaces for adjoining hotel development, a major retail center, new residential and office towers, a Tivoli-style outdoor garden, and an arts district centered around a new "Mummer's Theater."

By the time the plan was ready for official city adoption, Oklahoma City Mayor Jack Wilkes had resigned to become President of Centenary College in Shreveport, Louisiana. City Council members chose for his replacement local civic leader and historian George H. Shirk, also a noted historic preservationist. Despite his preservationist tendencies, Shirk proved to be an enthusiastic supporter of the Pei Plan, and eventually cast the deciding vote in the city council to approve the plan in 1965.

== Plan implementation: 1965–1980 ==
Implementation of the Pei Plan required a series of land acquisitions while replacement facilities and buildings were being built, and eventually grew to differ from Pei's original concept as landowners willingly sold properties to the Urban Renewal Authority, while other landowners targeted in the plan vigorously defended against eminent domain actions. Pei's original plan had called for the retention of, among other notable Oklahoma City landmarks, the Biltmore and Huckins Hotels.

The original plan also envisioned replacement facilities for downtown's John A. Brown Department Store, and the replacement of buildings along Main Street with an interior shopping arcade. Pei's plan had not finalized a site for the proposed convention center, which after negotiations between competing areas of the city was eventually located in an area of southeast downtown generally regarded as "skid row," with funding ensured by a July 1968 special election.

Large-scale demolition began in 1967, funded with federal redevelopment grants provided under the Johnson administration. By the early 1970s the redevelopment authority had constructed the new convention center, expanded and rerouted Broadway Avenue (now renamed E.K. Gaylord Avenue) in Oklahoma City as a six-lane commuter thoroughfare featuring the vast Santa Fe Parking Garage, and provided sites for new headquarters of the Kerr-McGee Corporation (now home to SandRidge Energy), Liberty Bank (now the BancFirst Tower), and Fidelity Bank (now the Park Harvey Center). A pedestrian tunnel project originally designed to connect with the proposed Main Street shopping arcade was also constructed.

Under the Nixon administration, however, generous support of urban renewal effort began to dwindle. Hotel and retail developments originally envisioned as part of the Pei Plan began to disintegrate as retailers opted for shopping mall developments rather than downtown locations (the principal shopping malls in Oklahoma City included Penn Square Mall, Shepherd Mall, Crossroads Mall, and later, Quail Springs Mall). In particular, department store company John A. Brown (which originally featured Oklahoma City-based ownership, but subsequently merged with the Dayton Hudson Corporation in 1971) announced plans to abandon its downtown location on January 30, 1974. The proposed site for the Main Street arcade — which was to have connected to both the underground pedestrian tunnel and the Myriad Gardens — already largely demolished, was minimally redeveloped into a surface-level parking garage owned by public authorities.

With a dearth of retail opportunities downtown, residential developments envisioned in the Pei Plan failed to develop. Later phases of reconstruction centered on public works projects rather than private redevelopment. In 1977 the last major demolition was accomplished to make way for the Myriad Botanical Gardens west of the convention center. That year also saw the construction of the Alfred P. Murrah Federal Building — later the target of the 1995 Oklahoma City bombing by Timothy McVeigh. By 1980, little if any redevelopment activity remained.

== Public reaction ==
The Criterion Theater in 1929, one of the more significant historical buildings lost to the Pei Plan. This image shows the marquee advertising for the 1929 film The Dance of Life

Public reaction to the Pei Plan became more negative over time as the redevelopment plans failed to create viable retail or residential options, and community activists bemoaned the loss of historical buildings. A preservationist group in Oklahoma City named the "Criterion Group" was named after the Criterion Theater — one of the most significant historical casualties of the Pei Plan — a French-style stage theater torn down in 1973 to make way for the Century Center (an enclosed shopping center which was largely vacant until 2015 when The Oklahoman opened offices in the space). Other casualties included the Baum Building (a Venetian-inspired structure that George Shirk attempted to save), the Hales Building (the owners of which fought condemnation efforts for nearly a decade), and the Biltmore Hotel, razed in 1977 to make way for the Myriad Botanical Gardens project. The delayed but negative reaction to the Pei Plan frustrated efforts by Oklahoma City authorities to instigate other urban renewal plans until the 1993 passage of the Metropolitan Area Projects (MAPS) initiative.

== Archive ==
The Oklahoma City/County Historical Society retains a large-scale conceptual architecture model of the early Pei Plan, housed on the second floor atrium of the Hart Building on the corner of Sheridan and Shartel Avenues in downtown Oklahoma City. In conjunction with several other organizations, the society sponsors an online archive of the Pei Plan and related downtown history.

== Bibliography ==
- Lackmeyer, Steve; Money, Jack (2006). OKC: Second Time Around. Oklahoma City: Full Circle Press. ISBN 0-9661460-2-6.
