= Metropolitan Area Projects Plan 3 =

The Metropolitan Area Projects Plan 3, or MAPS 3, is a $777 million public works and redevelopment project in Oklahoma City, Oklahoma funded by a temporary voter-approved sales tax increase. The one-cent sales tax initiative began in April 2010 and ended in December 2017. The structure of MAPS 3 is in the pay-as-you-go format of a Metropolitan Area Projects Plan including a temporary sales tax, multiple projects, and volunteer citizens oversight committee.

== History ==
Following the passage of the original Metropolitan Area Projects Plan in December 1993 and the MAPS-for-Kids in 2001, and short term tax in 2008 for improvements at the Ford Center to secure the new NBA team, Oklahoma City Thunder the sales tax was set to expire. Mayor Mick Cornett solicited for public input on what projects should be included in a MAPS3 proposal. Prior to that time, the City had conducted various planning studies that ultimately impacted projects that were included in MAPS 3.

=== Core to Shore ===
Interstate 40 (I-40) is a major east-west transportation route, stretching from Wilmington, North Carolina to Barstow, California. The Oklahoma City Crosstown Expressway was an elevated four mile (6 km) stretch of Interstate 40 that dissected downtown Oklahoma City. Its original design in the 1960s was unique, but by the 1970s the design was recognized to be deficient. In 1996 the first of many public meetings were held to determine a plan of action. By 2006 the Crosstown Expressway was being used by just under twice the number of vehicles as was originally designed, and the bridge was declared to be "deteriorating." Plans were made to relocate the interstate and demolish the Crosstown Expressway.

In 2002 Federal funds were secured to relocate the interstate about five blocks south of the original location. The new route was through one of the city's original industrial areas, much of the land for the highway was subsequently found to have significant pollution from industrial waste. The interstate realignment, which followed the north shore of the Oklahoma River, in effect, opened significant land south of downtown Oklahoma City to redevelopment.

In 2006, mayor Mick Cornett appointed to the 'Core to Shore' steering committee, a citizens advisory group tasked with developing a long term plan for redevelopment of the land between the original Crosstown Expressway route, which was the then southern border of the downtown core, to the shore of the Oklahoma River. The steering committee members and several ad hoc committees spent 13 months in a planning process that also included two public meetings to gather public input. The resulting Core to Shore Plan was a 750-acre (3,000,000 m^{2}) redevelopment blueprint that included a new 40-acre park along with a new convention center.

=== Fixed Guideway Study ===
The Association of Central Oklahoma Governments (ACOG) is one of Oklahoma's seven regional planning organizations; it is a voluntary association of city, town and county governments in the counties of Oklahoma, Cleveland, Canadian and Logan. In 2005 the Central Oklahoma Fixed Guideway Study (FGS) was completed and recommended feasible corridors for further investigation of commuter rail transit, bus rapid transit, a downtown Oklahoma City streetcar system, and an improved bus system to enhance connections among all public transportation services. Later, the City of Oklahoma City refined the study with its Greater Downtown Circulator Alternative Analysis, which was first planning step toward carrying out the metro area's Fixed Guideway Plan, and focused only on downtown and health center mobility. The Alternative Analysis recommended modern streetcar as the best overall transit technology and a 7.6 mile route.

=== Leading up to the MAPS 3 Election ===
The City conducted several public planning meetings when trying to determine the projects that might be contained in a third MAPS program. The Fixed Guideway and Core to Shore studies figured prominently in deliberations. Public transportation was popular as well as upgrades in parks and trails. The final proposal also included a $280 million convention center which was not publicly popular. The MAPS3 proposal faced fiercer opposition than both the earlier MAPS and MAPS-for-Kids proposals. Both Police and Fire Unions publicly opposed the plan because they felt it would strain resources needed for public safety. On December 8, 2009 the MAPS3 proposal passed by a 54-46 margin, the same margin as the original MAPS election.

== Citizens Advisory Board ==
The MAPS 3 Citizens Advisory Board is an arm of City Government, subject to the Oklahoma Open Meeting Act and Open Records Act. The Board, with 11 volunteer members, generally holds televised public meetings on a monthly basis, and was created to review proposed MAPS 3 projects and submit recommendations to City Council. The board is the primary interface with the Program Architect that is in charge of coordinating the various projects, assuring that funding is available before a project starts, etc.

Each of the eight projects of MAPS 3 has a citizen subcommittees, together consisting of more than 60 members that are appointed to provide additional input to the Citizens Advisory Board. Two members of the Advisory Board serve as the chair and vice-chair of each subcommittee. The subcommittees are the primary interface with a project's architect, and provide recommendations on site selections where necessary.

== Projects ==
The projects all have a basic theme of enhancing the city's quality of life and include:

- Convention Center – Based on the current budget($252 million), the facility will be approximately 470,000 sq ft (44,000 m^{2}) square feet. This reflects approximately 235,000 sq ft (21,800 m^{2}) sf of sellable space, including exhibition halls, meeting rooms and ballrooms, that were originally described in the city's Core to Shore redevelopment plan.
- Public Park – current budget $132 million for a 70-acre (280,000 m^{2}) downtown park similar to Houston's Discovery Green. A previous design concept, developed for the City's Core to Shore redevelopment plan, may influence the final design of the Downtown Public Park. The recently renovated Myriad Botanical Gardens could also influence the types of facilities and programs included in the Downtown Public Park. The park will be constructed in two phases, a 40 acre phase I north of I-40 and a 30 acres phase II between I-40 and the river, connected by the SkyDance pedestrian bridge.
- Modern Streetcar/Transit – current budget $129 million. Based on the Fixed Guideway Study, streetcars provide flexibility and relative low cost compared to other rail alternatives and the city's "Alternative Analysis" recommended a 7-mile (11 km) route. Based on available funds, the MAPS 3 Transportation subcommittee recommended a 4.5-mile (7.2 km) route connects the St. Anthony Hospital Complex, the Downtown Bus Transit Center, Oklahoma City (Amtrak station), the future MAPS 3 Convention Center and Chesapeake Energy Arena, along with the Downtown Oklahoma City districts of Automobile Alley, Bricktown, Midtown, and runs a block from the future MAPS 3 Downtown Public Park. The construction would be in two phases; the second phase route has not been determined. Additional federal matching funds were expected to be available. Significant high density housing will need to be developed along the route for stable ridership. The Oklahoma City Streetcar system opened in December 2018.
- $57 million for improvements to the Oklahoma River Boathouse District, (headquarters for USA Canoe/Kayak and a training center for USRowing). There will be a new whitewater facility will offer rafting, kayaking and canoeing for all skill levels. Also included will be a Lighting and windscreens for the first 1,000 meters of the racecourse, and a starting system for the race facility, housed in the Chesapeake Finish Line Tower.
- $58 million for improvements at the Oklahoma State Fair, including a new expo building. The projects funded were initially identified in the Oklahoma State Fair Master Plan
- $39 million to extend about 32-mile (51 km) of bicycle and running trails that would connect major city parks and other public spaces, to be constructed in three phases. The need for additional trails was initially established in the 1997 Oklahoma City Trails Master Plan and the 2008 Bicycle Transportation Plan
- $9 million to build between 25-mile (40 km) and 36-mile (58 km) of sidewalks around the city, to be constructed in two phases. It has been known for several years that there is a need for additional sidewalks in Oklahoma City, both from the standpoint of Walkability and making the city more accessible.
- $50 million for four health and wellness aquatic centers to be located throughout the city, with each center designed to meet the needs of the surrounding community. The Wellness Centers would be operated by an independent contractor who would help design the facility. In many ways, the Health and Wellness, while one of the more popular projects, is also one of the more contentious of the projects. There were no previous studies to lay the groundwork for defining the project. It is also the project that has the most direct involvement of the City Council because, according to Councilperson Meg Salyer, "Everybody seems to have a slightly different understanding of what Wellness means". As of the middle of 2014, multiple Requests For Proposals had been issued to potential operators and locations, but only two of the proposed four had been selected.

Recognizing that the city's economy may fluctuate during the time of the sales tax collection, and that there may be unforeseen project contingencies, the program also has a significant Infrastructure/Contingency component. Included is a $47 million contingency, originally intended to be used to relocate a power station near the original convention center site next to the 'Core to Shore' neighborhood and the new 'Oklahoma Boulevard' to replace the old Crosstown Expressway space. However, since a new site was selected by the Maps III Convention Center committee that is closer to the central business district, the funds will remain in contingency to be used as needed for any of the main projects.
