= Cowboy Bob =

Cowboy Bob may refer to:

== People ==
- Bob Bradley (wrestler) (also "Cowboy" Bob Bradley; born 1958), American professional wrestler
- Bob Kelly (wrestler) (also "Cowboy" Bob Kelly; 1936–2014), American professional wrestler and booker
- Robert H. Macy (also "Cowboy Bob"; 1930–2011), American Democratic District Attorney in Oklahoma
- Bob Orton Jr. (also "Cowboy" Bob Orton; born 1950), American professional wrestler
- Peggy Jo Tallas (1944–2005), American bank robber nicknamed "Cowboy Bob" by the media

== Fictional characters ==
- Cowboy Bob, from the daily syndicated newspaper comic strip Dennis the Menace
- Cowboy Bob, from the 1990 Simpsons episode "The Call of the Simpsons", voiced by Albert Brooks
