= George H. Shirk =

American politician

- George H. Shirk

30th Mayor of Oklahoma City
- In office June 16, 1964 – April 11, 1967
- Preceded by: Jack S. Wilkes
- Succeeded by: James Norick

Personal details
- Born: May 1, 1913 Oklahoma City, Oklahoma
- Died: March 23, 1977 (aged 63) Oklahoma City, Oklahoma
- Occupation: attorney, civic leader
- Known for: Former Mayor of Oklahoma City

George Henry Shirk (May 1, 1913 – March 23, 1977) was a lawyer, historian, and former Mayor of Oklahoma City, Oklahoma. In addition to being an author on several subjects related to the history of Oklahoma, he was known as a civic leader and proponent of various municipal development projects within central Oklahoma.

== Early life and military experience ==
George Shirk was born in Oklahoma City, Oklahoma, on May 1, 1913, son of John Henry Shirk and Carrie (Hinderer) Shirk. Having earned an LL.B. degree from the University of Oklahoma (OU) Law School, George Shirk passed the Oklahoma bar exam in 1936 and entered practice at his father's Oklahoma City law firm of Shirk and Danner. While attending OU he enrolled in Reserve Officers Training Corps (ROTC) and eventually saw active duty in a field artillery command in the European theater of World War II. He attained the rank of colonel in the U.S. Army in 1945.

== Professional career and amateur historian ==
After service in World War II, Shirk practiced law in Oklahoma City, in partnership with lawyers W.R. Withington and James E. Work – first in the law firm of Withington, Shirk, Nichols & Work, and later with the firm of Shirk, Withington, Work & Robinson.

Lucrative financial settlements in his legal profession allowed Shirk to pursue his passion, namely writing and publishing on unique topics in Oklahoma history. In 1949, he worked on the committee that selected sites to be designated as historical markers within the state, and wrote the text for many of these markers. Shirk also wrote and published 29 articles for the Oklahoma Historical Society (OHS) from 1948 to 1977, focusing mostly on Oklahoma-related Civil War history and philately/postal service history. He also wrote extensively for The American Philatelist.

Shirk became administratively involved with the OHS, serving as President of its board of directors from 1958 to 1975. During this tenure he was successful in obtaining matching grants for the OHS after being appointed as State Historical Preservation Officer. For his efforts, Shirk earned the nickname "Mr. Oklahoma History."

== Civic leadership and mayoral tenure ==
In 1953, Shirk joined the Committee of 100, a group of concerned citizens who advocated changes in the Oklahoma City charter. The next year, he joined the City Safety Council, which advocated better police and fire protection. He was then asked to join the Committee of 19, a group searching for a solution to the water needs of Oklahoma City. In this capacity, Shirk was a proponent of the public works project which connected Oklahoma City's water supply to Lake Atoka Reservoir in southeastern Oklahoma via Lake Stanley Draper.

Shirk was appointed acting Mayor of Oklahoma City on June 16, 1964, to complete the remainder of the term of Jack S. Wilkes. Shirk was then elected to a two-year term in his own right in April 1965. In addition to completing the Lake Atoka project that he advocated in the 1950s, Shirk also obtained the adoption of a comprehensive downtown re-development plan envisioned by architect I.M. Pei in September 1965. The Pei Plan included the construction of the Myriad Botanical Gardens and the creation of parking structures in downtown Oklahoma City, at the expense of the demolition of a significant amount of older buildings in the downtown area.

In 1969, Shirk and three other persons lead a small expedition to explore a section of catacombs associated with an old Chinese-American neighborhood in downtown Oklahoma City, located underneath the construction site of the Myriad Convention Center which was a part of Shirk's downtown redevelopment plan.

== Awards and recognition ==
On November 14, 1976, the George H. Shirk Oklahoma History Center at Oklahoma City University was dedicated. The center houses his collection of rare books, stamps, and maps. Before his death on March 23, 1977, Shirk was inducted into the Oklahoma Hall of Fame in 1969. He was also inducted into the Oklahoma Historians Hall of Fame. He is buried in Rose Hill Cemetery in Oklahoma City.

== Bibliography ==
=== Articles ===
- Shirk, George H. (1948). "Early Post Offices in Oklahoma" (PDF). Chronicles of Oklahoma. 26 (2). Oklahoma Historical Society: 179–244. Archived from the original (PDF) on 2011-05-23.
- Shirk, George H. (1948). "Some Letters Form the Rev. Samuel A. Worcester" (PDF). Chronicles of Oklahoma. 26 (4). Oklahoma Historical Society: 468–478. Archived from the original (PDF) on 2011-05-23.
- Shirk, George H. (1949). "Oklahoma's Two Commemorative Stamps" (PDF). Chronicles of Oklahoma. 27 (1). Oklahoma Historical Society: 89–94. Archived from the original (PDF) on 2011-05-23.
- Shirk, George H. (1949). "The Site of Old Camp Arbuckle" (PDF). Chronicles of Oklahoma. 27 (3). Oklahoma Historical Society: 313–315. Archived from the original (PDF) on 2011-05-23.
- Shirk, George H. (1950). "Peace on the Plains" (PDF). Chronicles of Oklahoma. 28 (1). Oklahoma Historical Society: 2–41. Archived from the original (PDF) on 2011-05-23.
- Shirk, George H.; Muriel H. Wright (1950). "The Journal of Lieutenant A.W. Whipple" (PDF). Chronicles of Oklahoma. 28 (3). Oklahoma Historical Society: 235–283. Archived from the original (PDF) on 2011-05-23.
- Shirk, George H. (1952). "First Post Offices Within the Boundaries of Oklahoma" (PDF). Chronicles of Oklahoma. 30 (1). Oklahoma Historical Society: 38–104. Archived from the original (PDF) on 2011-05-23.
- Shirk, George H. (1952). "The Great Seal of the Confederacy" (PDF). Chronicles of Oklahoma. 30 (3). Oklahoma Historical Society: 309–311. Archived from the original (PDF) on 2011-05-23.
- Shirk, George H.; Muriel H. Wright (1953). "Artist Möllhausen in Oklahoma, 1853" (PDF). Chronicles of Oklahoma. 31 (4). Oklahoma Historical Society: 392–441. Archived from the original (PDF) on 2011-05-23.
- Shirk, George H. (1955). "Mail Call at Fort Washita" (PDF). Chronicles of Oklahoma. 33 (1). Oklahoma Historical Society: 14–35. Archived from the original (PDF) on 2011-05-23.
- Shirk, George H. (1957). "The Lost Colonel" (PDF). Chronicles of Oklahoma. 35 (2). Oklahoma Historical Society: 180–193. Archived from the original (PDF) on 2011-05-23.
- Shirk, George H. (1958). "Oklahoma's Philatelic Year" (PDF). Chronicles of Oklahoma. 36 (1). Oklahoma Historical Society: 48–52. Archived from the original (PDF) on 2011-05-23.
- Shirk, George H. (1958). "Action on Chicollo Creek" (PDF). Chronicles of Oklahoma. 36 (3). Oklahoma Historical Society: 234–257. Archived from the original (PDF) on 2011-05-23.
- Shirk, George H. (1958). "The Case of the Plagiarized Journal" (PDF). Chronicles of Oklahoma. 36 (4). Oklahoma Historical Society: 371–410. Archived from the original (PDF) on 2011-02-21.
- Shirk, George H. (1959). "Campaigning with Sheridan: A Farrier's Diary" (PDF). Chronicles of Oklahoma. 37 (1). Oklahoma Historical Society: 68–105. Archived from the original (PDF) on 2011-05-23.
- Shirk, George H. (1959). "Judge Edgar S. Vaught" (PDF). Chronicles of Oklahoma. 37 (4). Oklahoma Historical Society: 394–404. Archived from the original (PDF) on 2011-05-23.
- Shirk, George H. (1963). "Confederate Postal System in the Indian Territory". Chronicles of Oklahoma. 41 (2). Oklahoma Historical Society: 160–218.
- Shirk, George H. (1964). "Malmaison Today". Chronicles of Oklahoma. 42 (1). Oklahoma Historical Society: 74–80.
- Shirk, George H. (1966). "The Post Offices of Oklahoma, 1907 to 1965". Chronicles of Oklahoma. 44 (1). Oklahoma Historical Society: 31–90.
- Shirk, George H. (1967). "A Tour on the Prairies Along the Washington Irving Trail". Chronicles of Oklahoma. 45 (3). Oklahoma Historical Society: 313–331.
- Shirk, George H. (1967). "Indian Territory Command in the Civil War". Chronicles of Oklahoma. 45 (4). Oklahoma Historical Society: 464–471.
- Shirk, George H. (1969). "Military Duty on the Western Frontier". Chronicles of Oklahoma. 47 (2). Oklahoma Historical Society: 118–125.
- Shirk, George H. (1971). "Journal of Private Johnson". Chronicles of Oklahoma. 49 (4). Oklahoma Historical Society: 437–451.
- Shirk, George H. (1974). "Oklahomans in Space". Chronicles of Oklahoma. 52 (2). Oklahoma Historical Society: 139–151.
- Shirk, George H. (1975). "Cherokee Post Office". Chronicles of Oklahoma. 53 (4). Oklahoma Historical Society: 476–478.
- Shirk, George H. (1976). "Beaties Prairie, a Post Office". Chronicles of Oklahoma. 54 (2). Oklahoma Historical Society: 261–262.
- Shirk, George H. (1976). "Oklahoma's State Flag As A Commemorative Stamp". Chronicles of Oklahoma. 54 (3). Oklahoma Historical Society: 311–313.
- Shirk, George H. (1977). "Seymour". Chronicles of Oklahoma. 55 (1). Oklahoma Historical Society: 93–99.
- Shirk, George H.; Howard L. Meredith (1977). "Oklahoma City: Growth and Reconstruction, 1889-1939". Chronicles of Oklahoma. 55 (3). Oklahoma Historical Society: 293–308.

=== Books ===
- Shirk, George H.; Muriel H. Wright; Kenny A. Franks (1976). Mark of Heritage. Norman, Oklahoma: University of Oklahoma Press. ISBN 978-0-8061-1356-2.
- Shirk, George H. (1974). Oklahoma Place Names. Norman, Oklahoma: University of Oklahoma Press. ISBN 978-0-8061-1140-7.
