= Jim Norick Arena =

Multi-purpose arena in Oklahoma City, Oklahoma

Coordinates: 35.470604°N 97.573438°W

- The Big House
- Interactive map of Jim Norick Arena
- Former names: Fairgrounds Arena
- Address: 333 Gordon Cooper Avenue Oklahoma City, OK 73107
- Location: Oklahoma City, Oklahoma USA
- Owner: City of Oklahoma City
- Operator: Oklahoma State Fair Park
- Capacity: 10,944

Construction
- Opened: 1965
- Closed: 2025
- Demolished: August 12, 2025

Tenant
- Oklahoma City Blazers (CHL) (1965–1972)

Jim Norick Arena (formerly Fairgrounds Arena) was a large multi-purpose arena located at State Fair Park in Oklahoma City, Oklahoma. Completed in 1965 at a cost of $2.4 million, it was the largest indoor facility in Oklahoma City until the construction of the Myriad Convention Center. It is named for Jim Norick, the mayor of Oklahoma City during the building's construction.

The building was unique in that it had the largest roof of its type in the world. It was the second largest city-owned multi-purpose arena, after Paycom Center, and it has the largest impact for a publicly owned facility in Oklahoma City.

It was home to the Oklahoma City Blazers of the CHL from 1965 through 1972. It was also home to the Professional Rodeo Cowboys Association's National Finals Rodeo from 1965 through 1978, when the event was moved to the Myriad. In the early years of the Professional Bull Riders, the Bud Light Cup Tour held an annual event at the arena from 1999 through 2001, before it was moved to the Ford Center, now Paycom Center.

Elvis Presley played here on November 16, 1970, to a sell out crowd of around 11,000. The Grateful Dead's performance on October 19, 1973, was recorded and later released as Dick's Picks Volume 19.

The arena was used during the Oklahoma State Fair to host Disney on Ice and the state fair rodeo. It was also the venue for the Oklahoma small school state basketball tournaments, school graduations, and various other equine events through the year.

Construction on a new $85 million coliseum to replace the Norick Arena was scheduled to begin in September 2022. The new arena, the OG&E Coliseum, opened June 11, 2025. The old arena was demolished August 12, 2025.
