= Jonathan Lopes =

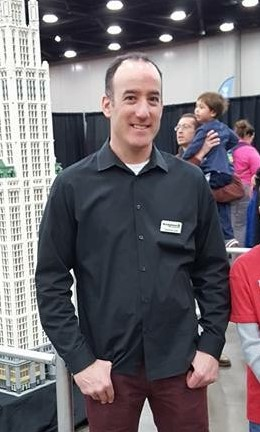
- Jonathan Lopes at a BrickUniverse convention
- Born: July 16, 1969 (age 57); Atlantic City, New Jersey
- Known for: Art, sculpture

Jonathan Lopes (born July 16, 1969) is a San Diego, California-based artist who is known for creating realistic models, sculptures, and contemporary artwork utilizing LEGO bricks as a medium.

== Early childhood and career ==
Lopes was raised in southeastern Massachusetts, where as a child he pursued creative avenues such as drawing, printmaking, and composing music. LEGO bricks were his toy of choice growing up. Having only a small assortment of pieces, he continually designed and redesigned his own creations from the same set. Lopes has always been an out-of-the-box thinker and naturally creative. These attributes set the foundation for his creative future.

In 1990, at the age of 20, Lopes moved to New York City to pursue a career as a musician.

== Career ==
=== LEGO artist ===
After sidelining his musical ambitions at the age of 28, Lopes ventured into utilizing LEGO as a creative outlet. Shortly thereafter, he designed what would become his first urban landscape made with LEGO bricks in his Boerum Hill, Brooklyn studio. This landscape, complete with urban grit and weathered buildings and landscapes, was featured prominently in online blogs, magazines, fan sites, and newspapers. From this media attention, Lopes' creative career as an artist was established.

His early hired works echoed the attributes and characteristics of his urban landscapes when he was asked to replicate Oklahoma City's Myriad Botanical Gardens. He was hired to replicate Harlem's Apollo Theatre for display at the Toys R Us in New York City's Time Square shortly thereafter. Currently, selections of Lopes' work are permanently placed at Morris Museum in Morristown, New Jersey as well as corporate installations at the offices of various book publishers, an industry Lopes has worked in for years.

Well-known works include a 12-foot-long (3.7 m) replica of New York City's Manhattan Bridge and an 8-foot-tall (2.4 m) replica of New York City's Woolworth Building. Both were built for gallery exhibits and built to celebrate the 100th anniversary of each landmark.

=== BrickUniverse conventions ===
Lopes has been a mainstay at BrickUniverse LEGO fan conventions since 2015 as the featured artist appearing at all of the shows. He exhibits approximately 30-35 works at each convention as well as presenting sessions on his project development, creative processes, building philosophies, and techniques.

=== Notable public displays ===
- Hachette Book Group, New York, New York
- Toys R Us, New York, New York
- Oklahoma City Scapes, Oklahoma City, Oklahoma
- BrickUniverse conventions: 2015-2016: Raleigh, North Carolina; Irving, Texas; Columbus, Ohio; Plano, Texas; Tulsa, Oklahoma; Dallas, Texas
- BrickUniverse conventions: 2017: Louisville, Kentucky; Oklahoma City, Oklahoma; Raleigh, North Carolina; Knoxville, Tennessee; Tulsa, Oklahoma; Cleveland, Ohio
- The Morris Museum, Morristown, New Jersey

== Personal life ==
Lopes is married to children's book author Marcie Colleen. In 2015, after 13 years of living in Boerum Hill, Brooklyn, they relocated to San Diego, California.
