= Ron Norick =

American politician

34th Mayor of Oklahoma City
- In office April 14, 1987 – April 9, 1998
- Preceded by: Andy Coats
- Succeeded by: Kirk Humphreys

Personal details
- Born: August 5, 1941 (age 85) Oklahoma City, Oklahoma, U.S.
- Party: Republican
- Children: Lance Norick
- Parent: James Norick (father)
- Education: Oklahoma City University

Ronald J. Norick (born August 5, 1941) is an American politician. A Republican, he served as mayor of Oklahoma City, Oklahoma from 1988 to 1998. He is the son of James H. Norick, who served as Mayor of Oklahoma City from 1959 to 1963 and 1967 to 1971. He attended Oklahoma City University and studied management. He is a former bank director and manager of Norick Investments Company LLC. He was inducted into the Oklahoma Hall of Fame in 2008.

He was the mayor of Oklahoma City when the 1995 bombing of the Alfred P. Murrah Federal Building occurred. Months after the bombing, Norick appointed a task force to look into a creation of a permanent memorial where the Murrah building once stood.

He opened a local hardware store in the Quail Creek area of North OKC in 2018, with his son Lance Norick.

== See also ==
- Metropolitan Area Projects
- Ronald J. Norick Downtown Library
