= Metropolitan Area Projects Plan =

Plans in Oklahoma City, Oklahoma

Metropolitan Area Projects Plan (MAPS) is a multi-year, municipal capital improvement program, consisting of a number of projects, originally conceived in the 1990s in Oklahoma City by its then mayor Ron Norick. A MAPS program features several interrelated and defined capital projects, funded by a temporary sales tax (allowing projects to be paid for in cash, without incurring debt), administered by a separate dedicated city staff funded by the sales tax, and supervised by a volunteer citizens oversight committee.

In some ways, a MAPS program is similar to a local option sales tax. However, taxes collected by a MAPS program do not go to a city's general fund, but are instead deposited into a trust dedicated to the specific projects identified in the ordinance's enabling ordinance. Additionally, MAPS programs are only indirectly controlled by a city's elected governance body. A citizens oversight committee provides direct oversight, which is also established by the enabling ordinance.

== Features of a MAPS program ==
The key features of the original program were designed to provide accountability to the citizens of the community as well as provide a funding mechanism for capital projects without using a city's general revenue funds, and included:

- Several capital projects, each designed to appeal to a variety of demographic groups within the city, while at the same time having "those projects geographically close to each other to create a synergy of activity for people."
- The overall program would be funded by a dedicated, multi-year sales tax with a start date and end date
- Projects would be paid for in cash, without incurring debt; with this "pay as you go" approach, construction does not start until the cost of the project has been collected; money is in an interest bearing bank account and not deposited in the city's general fund.
- The Program would be overseen by a volunteer citizens advisory committee, whose recommendations for architects, plans and construction documents, contractors, and change-orders would be forwarded to city council for approval
- Projects would be administered by a separate and dedicated city staff, hired specifically for the term of the program, with salaries and expenses a component of program costs, paid from sales tax revenue
- Each project would be allocated an endowment sufficient to operate and maintain the building without additional cost to the city's general fund

A common challenge of "pay as you go" programs such as MAPS is that, because the lead-up time while accumulating the needed funds can be lengthy, specific projects of the program "are often are scuttled when administrations change and new leaders want their own signature projects... Oklahoma City was able to avoid this pitfall ‹because the city› changes mayors, but not strategies." Because the voters approved a multi-year temporary sales tax that was dedicated to multiple specific projects that together had significant public support, and because the infrastructure to support the program and its projects was also temporary with dedicated funding from the sales tax, a change in elected officials has not been sufficient to change the scope of the program.

A key to success is the feature of multiple projects; while each project taken individually might not have sufficient support for individual funding, when taken as a group, the package has sufficient support for funding. Said another way, it is important to "bundle projects to enhance community buy-in." Another benefit of multiple projects is that by staging the projects, citizens may have their confidence level increased by being shown staggered "early results ‹with less expensive projects› ... by experiencing a string of groundbreakings."

== History ==
In many ways the early 1980s recession in the United States began in Oklahoma City with the collapse of the Penn Square Bank. This subsequent collapse of the state's energy business and failure of additional financial institutions, led to a significant out-migration and excess capacity in real estate. The resulting lack of infrastructure investment in the inner city proved to be a factor in the city's inability to attract new business. In the early 1990s some Oklahoma City interests were concerned about what they perceived as civic decline. In 1992, after the city lost a contract to house a new maintenance facility for United Airlines to Indianapolis, Indiana because the airline considered Indianapolis to have a better standard of living and quality of life, then-mayor Ron Norick and the Greater Oklahoma City Chamber of Commerce proposed MAPS as a measure to improve the city's economy and attractiveness as a tourist destination.

City residents were initially skeptical over funding the public projects through a sales tax increase, and as late as a month before the tax referendum opposed the plan by a 20% margin. However, the plan did pass by a slim margin in a vote in December, 1993. During the five year tax period the city raised nearly $310 million in direct taxes, plus $52 million of income on the tax money it had deposited. The tax was extended with voter approval for an additional six months to raise enough money to complete all of the projects, and construction continued until 2004.

Encouraged by the success of MAPS, city leaders proposed and adopted "MAPS for Kids", a public school improvement program. In December 2009 the city approved a third program, "MAPS 3", which would build $777 million in further improvements paid for by a similar sales tax increase.

== Oklahoma City MAPS initiative ==
The MAPS initiatives in Oklahoma City, to date, consist of four major programs: The original MAPS program, MAPS for Kids, MAPS 3, and MAPS 4.

=== MAPS ===
The original Metropolitan Area Projects Plan, or MAPS, was a $350 million public works and redevelopment project in Oklahoma City, Oklahoma during the middle to late 1990s, funded by a temporary, five year, voter-approved sales tax increase. "The various MAPS projects were believed to be capable of improving the economy and attractiveness of this ‹downtown› core and having a profound impact on proximal areas;" the common theme of the projects was downtown redevelopment. The original MAPS program comprised nine projects that took 10 years to complete, and were chosen to appeal to a wide variety of city residents and also revitalize the city's downtown:

- renovations to the Civic Center Music Hall including the 2,500 seat Thelma Gaylord Performing Arts Theater, the 290 seat Freedie Little Theater, the 100 seat City Space Theater, the 5,000 sf Minders Hall of Mirrors, and the 3,100 sf Joel Levine Rehearsal Hall.
- renovations to The Myriad (now the Prairie Surf Studios) including a 100,000 sf expansion of the convention space. The Cox center also included a 15,000 seat multi-purpose arena that was home to the Oklahoma City Barons hockey team (the top farm team of the Edmonton Oilers).
- renovations to the Oklahoma State Fairgrounds
- construction of the Chickasaw Bricktown Ballpark home of the Oklahoma City Dodgers, the Triple-A affiliate of the Los Angeles Dodgers Major League Baseball team. The park has seating for up to 13,066 fans and currently utilizes a seating capacity of 9,000 for Dodgers games.
- construction of the 18,203 seat Ford Center (now called Paycom Center), an indoor multipurpose sports arena. The arena was completed for several years before it became an important aspect of plans in 2006 through 2008 by local businessman Clay Bennett, who led the purchase of the Seattle SuperSonics, and later moved the basketball team to Oklahoma City. The NBA team is now called the Oklahoma City Thunder.
- construction of the "Bricktown Canal" which provided a core investment to transform a former warehouse district into an entertainment district; with "recreation activities available in Bricktown are currently ‹2009› estimated to draw 2.9 million visits annually"
- construction of a riverfront and recreational dams on the North Canadian River (this section of the river has been renamed the Oklahoma River, its lower section is known as the Boathouse District, the headquarters for USA Canoe/Kayak and a training center for USRowing)
- a new Library/learning Center, later called the Ronald J. Norick Downtown Library, a four-story main library to replace a facility that had been built in 1951
- development of the Oklahoma Spirit Trolleys, a trolley-replica bus network

Metropolitan Area Projects plan
Choice	Votes	%
For	33,367	54.58
Against	27,762	45.42
Total	61,129	100.00

=== MAPS for Kids ===
The second MAPS program, called MAPS for Kids, was a $700 million initiative to improve schools in the various school districts whose boundaries coincided with the City of Oklahoma City. Oklahoma has school districts whose boundaries have nothing to do with the boundaries of any other political subdivision. At the time the original MAPS tax was expiring, the Oklahoma City Public Schools system was struggling with little political capital. "They could not pass bond issues, and the school buildings were falling apart as a result." Then mayor Kirk Humphreys proposed a second MAPS program to repair more than 100 area schools. With the addition of a $180-million bond issue and an eye on addressing childhood obesity issues, new gymnasiums were added to all of the Oklahoma City District's elementary schools. The program was approved by voters in 2001. This temporary sales tax was collected for seven years, with 70 percent disbursed to the Oklahoma City School District and 30 percent to 23 Suburban School Districts.

MAPS for Kids
Choice	Votes	%
For	36,866	60.58
Against	23,989	39.42
Total	60,855	100.00

=== MAPS 3 ===
MAPS 3 is a $777 million program, approved by voters in 2009 with 54% of the vote (the same percentage as the Original MAPS.) The one-cent sales tax initiative began in April 2010 and ended in December 2017. After a year of public meetings organized by Mayor Mick Cornett, there developed a consensus that a future MAPS program should focus on projects that improved the Quality of Life in Oklahoma City. Hundreds of citizens suggested projects to be considered; through a series of public meetings eight projects were eventually selected to be included in the MAPS 3 proposal.

- New Downtown Convention Center
- New Downtown Public Park - 70 acres, including festival areas
- New Modern Streetcar/Transit system and an inter-modal transit hub
- New Senior Health and Wellness Centers; multiple structures in various parts of the city designed to encourage healthy lifestyles and serve as a gathering place for active seniors
- Improvements to the Oklahoma River including a whitewater training facility and various upgrades to the world-class rowing racecourse
- Improvements to the Oklahoma State Fair Grounds including replacing public event buildings
- Expansion of Trails system that interconnects the city's major parks for walking and biking
- Expansion of neighborhood sidewalks to create a more walkable community

Recognizing that the city's economy may fluctuate during the time of the sales tax collection, and that there may be unforeseen project contingencies, the program also has a significant Infrastructure/Contingency component.

The public forum process used to identify projects to be included in the MAPS 3 program established enough public political support to overcome an effort by a newly elected city council person who attempted to derail the original MAPS 3 proposal. An initiative petition was filed that would have eliminated the Convention Center and ended the sales tax earlier. This council person also ran for Mayor, with MAPS being a major factor in the election. Mayor Cornett was re-elected for an unprecedented 4th term with 65.7% of the vote.

MAPS 3
Choice	Votes	%
For	40,956	54.30
Against	34,465	45.70
Total	75,421	100.00

=== MAPS 4 ===
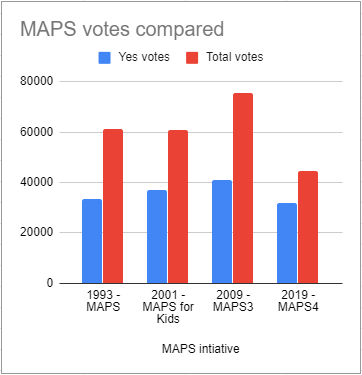
Comparison of Yes votes and total votes of the MAPS initiatives

On December 10, 2019, voters passed MAPS 4. The one cent sales tax will be extended for eight years, and is expected to bring in $978 million. Sixteen Projects are centered around neighborhood and quality of life needs for the city.

MAPS 4
Choice	Votes	%
For	31,865	71.71
Against	12,574	28.29
Total	44,439	100.00

=== Impact of MAPS in Oklahoma City ===
The MAPS programs have had significant impact in Oklahoma City, both economically and from a quality of life standpoint. In the 20 years since its inception "nearly $5 billion in economic impact can be attributed to the original MAPS program. This represents a nearly 10-fold return on the city's original investment."

As was recently reported in a Wichita newspaper, "From quirky festivals and dozens of restaurants to outdoor recreation and romantic riverboat rides, a revitalized downtown Oklahoma City boasts so many attractions it is quickly becoming a favorite weekend destination for Oklahomans and Kansans alike."

It is arguable that in terms of associated investment, hotels segment represent the largest impact of the original MAPS. "In 1992-93 when the city's leaders developed the plans for the MAPS investments, there was only one significant hotel operating in downtown Oklahoma City. What is now the Sheraton had nearly 400 rooms but was in need of upgrading. By 2008, there were seven significant hotels in the Downtown CBD and Bricktown with a total of about 1,600 rooms."
