= Andy Coats =

American politician

33rd Mayor of Oklahoma City
- In office April 13, 1983 – April 14, 1987
- Preceded by: Patience Latting
- Succeeded by: Ron Norick

Oklahoma County District Attorney
- In office 1976–1980
- Preceded by: Curtis Harris
- Succeeded by: Robert H. Macy

Personal details
- Born: January 19, 1935 (age 91) Oklahoma City, Oklahoma, U.S.
- Party: Democratic
- Education: University of Oklahoma
- Profession: Attorney

Andrew Montgomery Coats (born January 19, 1935) is an American lawyer and politician. He attended the University of Oklahoma. A Democrat, he served as mayor of Oklahoma City, Oklahoma from 1983 to 1987. In 1984, Coats successfully argued the case NCAA v. Board of Regents of the University of Oklahoma before the U.S. Supreme Court, which held that the National Collegiate Athletic Association (NCAA) television plan violated the Sherman and Clayton Antitrust Acts. From 1996 to 2010, he was the Dean of the University of Oklahoma College of Law. He is also a former president of the American College of Trial Lawyers. From 1976 to 1980, he was Oklahoma County District Attorney. In 1980, he unsuccessfully ran in the United States Senate election to replace Henry Bellmon. He was inducted into the Oklahoma Hall of Fame in 2005. His son, Sanford Coats served as United States Attorney for the Western District of Oklahoma from 2009 to 2016. To date, he is the last member of the Democratic Party to be mayor of Oklahoma City.

Party political offices
Preceded by Ed Edmondson	Democratic nominee for U.S. Senator from Oklahoma (Class 3); 1980	Succeeded by James R. Jones
