= 1980 United States Senate election in Oklahoma =

- November 3, 1980
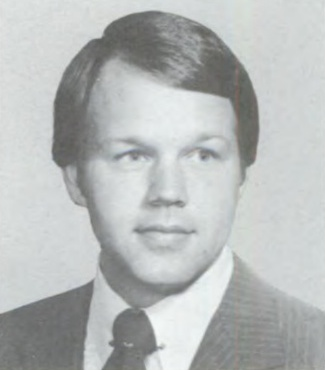

Nominee	Don Nickles	Andy Coats
Party	Republican	Democratic
Popular vote	587,252	478,283
Percentage	53.47%	43.55%
- County results Nickles: 40–50% 50–60% 60–70% 70–80% Coats: 40–50% 50–60% 60–70% 70–80%
U.S. senator before election
Henry Bellmon
Republican
Elected U.S. Senator
Don Nickles
Republican

The 1980 United States Senate election in Oklahoma was held November 3, 1980. Incumbent Republican U.S. Senator Henry Bellmon decided to retire, instead of seeking a third term. Republican nominee Don Nickles won the open seat.

== Major candidates ==
=== Democratic ===
- Andy Coats, Oklahoma County District Attorney

=== Republican ===
- Don Nickles, State Senator

== Campaign ==
After two years in the State Senate and displeased by the policies of the Carter Administration, Nickles ran for the United States Senate in 1980 to succeed Republican Henry Bellmon who was retiring. As an unknown in a field crowded with business and political bigwigs, Nickles was not initially given much of a chance. Bellmon even tried to convince him to wait and run for the U.S. House. Utilizing personal contact and passing out unique "wooden nickel" campaign button novelties, Nickles unique grassroot community ties to local Amway distributors throughout Oklahoma gave him an interpersonal network which proved helpful. Nickles beat two well funded oil millionaires (Jack Zink and Ed Noble) in the primary and won the primary run-off against Zink, a race car driver. He later won the general election against Democrat Oklahoma City Mayor Andy Coats and independent Charles Nesbitt, the Oklahoma Corporation Commissioner and former Oklahoma Attorney General. At the age of 31, Nickles was the youngest Republican ever elected to the United States Senate.

== Results ==
General election results
Party	Candidate	Votes	%
Republican	Don Nickles	587,252	53.47%
Democratic	Andy Coats	478,283	43.55%
Independent	Charles R. Nesbitt	21,179	1.93%
Libertarian	Robert T. Murphy	9,757	0.89%
Independent	Paul E. Trent	1,823	0.17%
Republican hold			

== See also ==
- 1980 United States Senate elections
