= Gateway (Van de Bovenkamp) =

Sculpture in Oklahoma City, Oklahoma, U.S.

- The sculpture in 2019
- Artist: Hans Van de Bovenkamp
- Year: 1993
- Medium: Metal sculpture
- Dimensions: 4.9 m × 4.6 m × 1.5 m (16 ft × 15 ft × 5 ft)
- Location: Oklahoma City, Oklahoma, U.S.
- 35.466229°N 97.519168°W

Gateway is a 1993 metal sculpture by Hans Van de Bovenkamp, installed in Oklahoma City's Myriad Botanical Gardens, in the U.S. state of Oklahoma. The abstract artwork was dedicated on November 16, 1993, and measures approximately 16 x 15 x 5 ft.

== See also ==
- 1993 in art
