= Patience Latting =

American politician (1918–2012)

32nd Mayor of Oklahoma City
- In office April 13, 1971 – April 12, 1983
- Preceded by: James Norick
- Succeeded by: Andy Coats

Personal details
- Born: August 27, 1918 Texhoma, Oklahoma
- Died: December 29, 2012 (aged 94) Oklahoma City, Oklahoma
- Party: Democratic
- Spouse: Trimble Latting
- Education: University of Oklahoma; Columbia University

Patience Sewell Latting (August 27, 1918 – December 29, 2012) was an American politician who served as Mayor of Oklahoma City, Oklahoma, from 1971 to 1983. Latting was the first female mayor of Oklahoma City.

== Early life ==
Latting was born in Texhoma, Oklahoma, on August 27, 1918. She graduated from Classen High School in Oklahoma City. She received a bachelor's degree with honors in mathematics from the University of Oklahoma in 1938. In 1939, Latting obtained a master's degree in economics and statistics from Columbia University in New York City.

== Political career ==
Latting became a member of both the Parent Teacher Association and the League of Women Voters. It was her membership in the League of Women Voters that led to her entry into the political realm in the early 1960s. Latting realized that the way state legislative district borders were drawn in Oklahoma was antiquated. Rural areas of the state still enjoyed more representation in the Oklahoma Legislature while more populated, urban areas were under-represented. The districts had not been reformed since Oklahoma achieved statehood in 1907. In 1964, Latting testified before a United States federal court which was investigating the legality of the state elections held that same year. Latting, who had a background in statistics, became involved in the reapportionment and redistricting of the new state House and Senate districts, which were more proportionally distributed between urban and rural areas.

In 1967, Latting was elected to the Oklahoma City Council representing Ward 2, becoming the first woman to serve on the council.

=== Mayor of Oklahoma City (1971–1983) ===
In 1971, Latting announced her candidacy for Mayor of Oklahoma City. She felt at the time that incumbent city officials were mismanaging city funds. Latting defeated fellow councilman Bill Bishop with 32,271 to 22,132 in a mayoral runoff election held on April 6, 1971. Bishop, her opponent, had been endorsed by outgoing Oklahoma City Mayor James Norick. Latting was sworn into office on April 13, 1971, becoming the city's first female mayor. Oklahoma City became the largest city in U.S. history to be headed by a woman at the time.

Latting's efforts to reform city government were opposed during her first year by city council, which had an "anti-reform council majority." In one instance, the council nullified all of Latting's appointments and nominations to various city boards and commissions while she was out of town. That overreach by her opponents on the council proved to be unpopular with Oklahoma City residents. Latting's allies won a majority of the seats on the council in the next municipal election as a result.

Latting held office as Mayor from 1971 to 1983. The city and her administration adopted a new master development plan during her tenure. Latting supported an urban renewal process, known as the Pei Plan, which saw hundreds of older, low-rise downtown buildings demolished in favor of skyscrapers and other modern structures. New businesses and manufacturers also moved to Oklahoma City during Latting's tenure, including General Motors and Xerox.

Latting served 3 four-year terms as mayor. She declined to run for re-election to a fourth term and retired from office in 1983. She was succeeded by Mayor Andy Coats.

== Recognitions and later life ==
In 1980, Latting was named to the Oklahoma Hall of Fame. She was also the 1995 recipient of the Constitution Award from Rogers State College for her career in public service. In 2005, a bust of Latting was dedicated in Oklahoma City Hall outside the mayor's office.

She remained actively involved with state charitable, cultural and civic groups after leaving office, including the Oklahoma Heritage Association, the Support Center of Oklahoma, and Oklahoma City Beautiful.

Most recently, the Patience Latting Library, the newest branch of the city's public library system, was opened to the public in 2011.

Latting died on December 29, 2012, at the age of 94. The late mayor was laid in state at Oklahoma City Hall beginning on January 3, 2013, becoming the first former mayor to receive this honor. Her coffin was placed in the city hall's main foyer surrounded by an honor guard of city police officers and firefighters. A funeral was held at Westminster Presbyterian Church in Oklahoma City on January 5, 2013. Her husband, oil businessman Trimble Latting, had died in 1996.

Political offices
Preceded by James Norick	Mayor of Oklahoma City; 1971–1983	Next: Andy Coats
