= Kirk Humphreys =

American businessman and politician

35th Mayor of Oklahoma City
- In office April 9, 1998 – November 3, 2003
- Preceded by: Ron Norick
- Succeeded by: Guy Liebmann

Personal details
- Born: September 13, 1950 (age 76)
- Party: Republican
- Education: University of Oklahoma

Kirk Humphreys (born September 13, 1950) is an American businessman and politician who served as Mayor of Oklahoma City from April 9, 1998, to November 3, 2003. He was considered a favorite candidate of the Republican party establishment for U.S. Senator in 2004, losing to former Congressman Tom Coburn, MD in the primary. Humphreys was appointed to The Oklahoma City Public Schools Board as Chairman in 2008, but was unseated in the next election by former state Sen. Angela Monson.

Humphreys is the Chairman Emeritus of Humphreys Capital, a real estate investment fund management company based in Oklahoma City.

== Education ==
Humphreys graduated from the University of Oklahoma in 1972 with a Bachelor of Business Administration in Finance.

== Career ==
From 1972 until 1989, Humphreys built a distribution business with his brothers that specialized in the distribution of beauty products and other non-food items to leading retailers across the United States. In 1989 he founded The Humphreys Company, a real estate development and investment firm. Among the company's projects is Carlton Landing, a 1,800-acre new town development on Lake Eufaula in southeastern Oklahoma.

Humphreys is Chairman Emeritus of Humphreys Capital, which manages real estate investment funds with more than one billion dollars in assets in 15 states.

Humphreys serves as a trustee of the Oklahoma Industries Authority and on the boards of The Navigators, New Horizons Foundation, the Oklahoma State Fair, Search Ministries, and the Campus Ministry Development Foundation. He formerly served as a director of OGE Energy, trustee of the Urban Land Institute, and chairman of the Baptist Sunday School Board (now Lifeway). Humphreys was the founding chairman of the Oklahoma District Council of ULI.

From 2008 until 2019, Humphreys was co-host of "Flash Point," an award-winning locally-produced Sunday morning political talk show on Oklahoma City NBC affiliate KFOR-TV alongside co-host Mike Turpen and moderator Kevin Ogle.

== Religious Liberties Controversy ==
On December 10, 2017, in his capacity as a "Flash Point" cohost, Humphreys made comments about his personal beliefs, the "me too" movement, homosexuality, and his belief in the existence of universal truth in a culture of moral relativism. His comments prompted calls for his resignation from the University of Oklahoma Board of Regents by the LGBTQ Alumni Society and Freedom Oklahoma. In addition, Paula Lewis, the chair of the Oklahoma City Public Schools board of education, issued a statement calling for Humphreys to resign from the board of a school he had co-founded in downtown Oklahoma City, the John Rex Charter Elementary School. A few dozen John Rex parents held a protest December 15, 2017, also demanding Humphreys' resignation from the school's board. In January, 2018, more than 2,000 parents of John Rex students and citizens of Oklahoma City signed a letter of support for Humphreys, demanding that he remain in a role of leadership for John Rex and defending his religious liberties http://m.news9.com/story.aspx?story=37220732&catId=112032 On December 21, 2017, at the end of a special meeting of the OU Board of Regents, Humphreys announced he would resign from the board of regents at the beginning of the spring semester in January 2018.

== Politics ==
Humphreys was elected to the Putnam City School Board in 1987 and served until 1995. In 1998, he was elected mayor of Oklahoma City and served two terms. As mayor, he changed the popular opinion of the downtown revitalization effort, known as Metropolitan Area Projects (or MAPS), to a more favorable view. This resulted in increased economic development and improved quality of living in the downtown Oklahoma City area and a move toward a second project, known as MAPS for Kids, aimed at a revitalization of the area's public schools.

In 2004, Humphreys was a candidate in the Republican primary for the U.S. Senate and was considered a favorite for the party's nomination as he was endorsed by incumbent Don Nickles and Oklahoma's other U.S. Senator James Inhofe. However, he was defeated by Tom Coburn with a vote of 61% to 25%.

== Personal ==
In 1972, Humphreys married the former Danna Kircher of Stroud, Oklahoma. They have three children and fifteen grandchildren.
