= Hans Van de Bovenkamp =

Dutch-born American sculptor (born 1938)

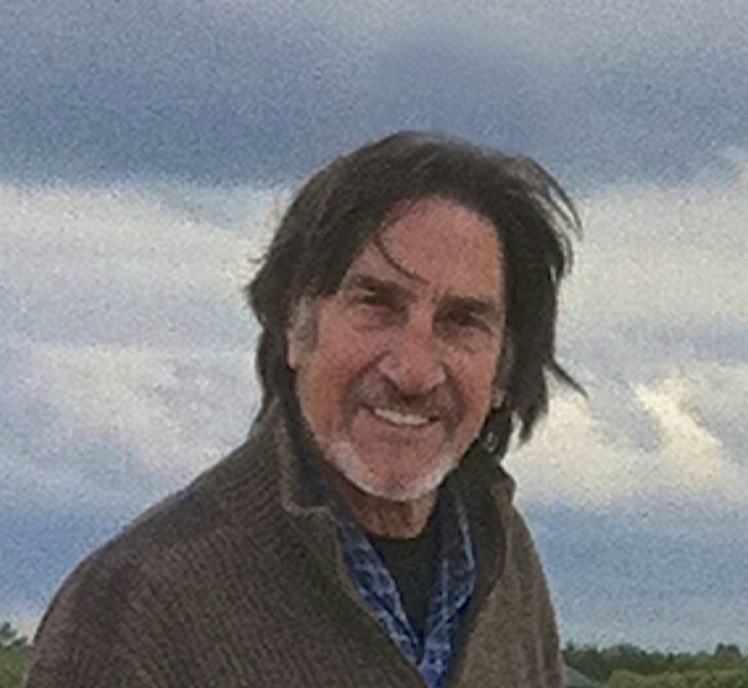
- Born: 1938 (age 87–88); Garderen, Holland
- Education: University of Michigan
- Occupation: sculptor
- Spouses: Janet Bovenkamp Stuart, Siv Cedering

Hans Van de Bovenkamp (born 1938) is a Dutch-born American sculptor. Van de Bovenkamp was born in Garderen, Holland in 1938 and immigrated to the United States in 1958. He is best known for his large scale abstract work in bronze, stainless steel, painted steel, and aluminum. Van de Bovenkamp's works are often influenced by myth, symbol, and nature. He is a member of the International Sculpture Center, the New York Sculptors Guild, and the Royal Society of British Sculptors.

== Early life ==
Hans Van de Bovenkamp was born in Garderen, Holland to parents Maria Johanna Le Jeu and Jan Albertus van de Bovenkamp in 1938. Van de Bovenkamp studied at the School of Architecture in Amsterdam, Netherlands until 1961. Following his parents emigration to Ontario, Canada, Van de Bovenkamp came to the United States to attend the University of Michigan in 1958. In 1958, during his first year of university, he was an apprentice for Richard Jennings, a sculptor of large kinetic fountains. Van de Bovenkamp studied with Joseph Goto, a sculptor and master welder from 1958 until 1961.

== Career ==
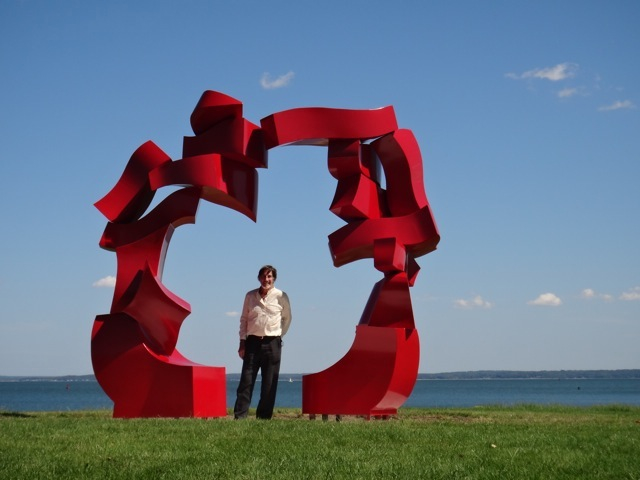
Hans Van de Bovenkamp with Red Oracle

Van de Bovenkamp moved to New York City and became a part of the 10th street gallery co-op movement following his graduation from the University of Michigan in 1961. In 1962, his first solo exhibit took place at the Little Gallery in Taos, New Mexico. The following year, Van de Bovenkamp developed sculptural ideas for the windows of Tiffany's on Fifth Avenue. Van de Bovenkamp began manufacturing limited edition fountains in a studio on Christopher Street in New York in 1967. He had fifteen assistants, including George Rhoads and Sybil and David Yurman. Together they produced more than five thousand fountains worldwide. Over the next ten years, Van de Bovenkamp exhibited his sculptures throughout the United States, including in New York City at New York University, Tiffany & Co., 10 Downtown, and Bryant Park; at Houston, Texas Contemporary Arts Museum; and at both the Stamford Museum and University of Connecticut. He is the founder of the New York's 10 Downtown project. His work has also been displayed in Italy, Lebanon, Venezuela, Switzerland, and Canada. Van de Bovenkamp's works have been featured in ten museums, embassies, and sculpture center shows, as well as numerous universities, public gardens and institutes. Kevin Miller has been Van de Bovenkamp's assistant since 1995.

Van de Bovenkamp received his first commission in 1966 to design a copper fountain made of cubist shapes for the Georgetown Plaza, at Eight Street and Broadway in Manhattan with his brother, Gerrit. He received another commission to create a sculpture on a highway stop along Nebraska's Interstate 80 to commemorate the United States Bicentennial in 1976. The sculpture has intersecting curving pathways of metal near the ground, then sends dual angled shafts, symbolizing road travel, approximately forty feet into the sky. This project, Roadway Confluence, was funded primarily by private contributions with additional financial support from the state government. Van de Bovenkamp was commissioned to create the Mariner's Gateway in 1968. The sculpture is located on the Hudson River in Haverstraw, New York.

On September 9, 2000, the Danubiana Portal and 16 additional Van de Bovenkamp sculptures were purchased for the opening of the Danubiana Meulensteen Art Museum in Slovakia.

Van de Bovenkamp began his "Menhirs" sculpture series in 2001. The sculptures consist of stacked balanced shapes. Hans was influenced by the piled boulders and stones from Stonehenge in England, the Baths at Virgin Gorda, and desert landscapes and conservation areas worldwide.

In 2002, Van de Bovenkamp moved to the Twins Oak Farm, a horse farm in Sagaponack, New York. He renovated the barns and buildings into his home, studio, and gallery. Most of the horse pastures were turned into landscapes for sculptures. He also created a sculpture garden on the grounds of Twins Oak Farm.

Van de Bovenkamp has work in the permanent collections of the City University of New York, Stony Brook University, Texas A&M University, University of Missouri, Jing'an Park in China, Mount Sinai Medical Center, and the Butler Institute of University Art Museum. Van de Bovenkamp's sculptures are also a part of private collection of the Rockefeller family corporate collections including Neiman Marcus, the Georgetown Plaza building, the Hyatt Regency, the Louis K. Meisel gallery and the Manhattan house. Art created by Van de Bovenkamp has been featured in group and solo exhibitions including exhibitions at the Contemporary Arts Museum Houston, the Oakland Museum of California, the Chicago Fair, the Shanghai Art Fair, the Bernarducci Meisel Gallery and the Sculpturesite Galleries.

Van de Bovenkamp served on the advisory board of the Institute for Symbolic Studies and the Omega Institute for Holistic Studies. He is currently represented by Louis K. Meisel Gallery, New York, New York, Gary Nader Gallery, Miami, Florida, Baker Sponder Gallery, Boca Raton, Florida, Sculpturesite, Sonoma, California, and Samuel Lynne Galleries, Dallas, Texas.

== Influence ==
Van de Bovenkamp's ideas about creating effect through scale were inspired by his studies of stele and other sculptural structures of ancient cultures during his travels to Mexico, North Africa, India, and Nepal.

== Awards ==
Van de Bovenkamp was awarded the Lowe sculpture award in 1964 for a "weldage" made of metal shapes. In 1976, he exhibited at the American Institute of Arts and Letters, and won the Nebraska Bicentennial Sculpture Competition in Sydney, Nebraska. Van de Bovenkamp won the Sanctuary Design Competition sponsored by the Omega Holistic Health Institute, in Rhinebeck, New York in 1996. Guild Hall awarded Van de Bovenkamp the best sculpture award in 2003 in East Hampton, New York.

== Personal life ==
Hans Van de Bovenkamp married twice, to Janet Bovenkamp Stuart and to artist and poet Siv Cedering, both deceased. He has two sons, Eric and Brett Van de Bovenkamp, and a daughter Cody Parker.

== See also ==
- Gateway (Van de Bovenkamp), Oklahoma City, Oklahoma, U.S.
