= Robert H. Macy =

Democratic District Attorney from 1980 until 2001 for Oklahoma County

Oklahoma County District Attorney
- In office June 16, 1980 – January 2001
- Preceded by: Andy Coats
- Succeeded by: Wes Lane

Personal details
- Born: July 5, 1930 Indianapolis, Indiana, U.S.
- Died: November 18, 2011 (aged 81)
- Party: Democratic Party
- Education: Earlham College; University of Oklahoma College of Law; Indiana University–Purdue University Indianapolis

Robert H. Macy (July 5, 1930 – November 18, 2011) was a Democratic District Attorney from 1980 until 2001 for Oklahoma County and the State's capital, Oklahoma City. He was nationally known for his impassioned performances in capital murder trials, sometimes followed by reversals on appeal, and in three cases, exonerations. He was President of the National District Attorneys' Association in 1992–93. Sometimes called "Cowboy Bob," Macy was a roper and rancher who often wore Western suits with a white shirt, black string tie, and black cowboy hat. He sometimes took his gun with him to court.

== Early life and education ==
Macy was born in Indianapolis, Indiana, to Harold and Ethel Macy. After graduating from Broad Ripple High School, he played football on a scholarship to Earlham College, finishing in 1954 with a degree in Geology and Religion. He enlisted in the United States Air Force, and married Betty D. Hendryx on June 30, 1956. He joined the Oklahoma City Police Department in 1957, and worked the night patrol while attending the University of Oklahoma College of Law. He received his law degree in 1961. Macy moved to Ada, Oklahoma and began his legal career as Assistant County Attorney for Pontotoc County. He earned a master's degree in Public Administration from Indiana University–Purdue University Indianapolis in 1977.

== One of the "Deadliest" District Attorneys ==
Governor George Nigh appointed Macy to fill the unexpired term of his predecessor, Andy Coats, who resigned the district attorney's office to run for the U.S. Senate. Macy took the oath of office as District Attorney on June 16, 1980. Macy won re-election by large margins, and was unopposed in his last election in 1998. A 2016 Harvard study identified him as one of the nation's five "deadliest" prosecutors. The study said that Macy "sent more people to death row (54) than any other individual district attorney in the United States." In 2001, Macy defended the death penalty, saying ''I feel like it makes my city, county and state a safer place for innocent people to live. And that's why I embrace it, not because I get any enjoyment out of it.'' Macy was once dragged from a courtroom after he became angry when a jury acquitted six defendants for shooting at law enforcement officers.

Macy is perhaps best known as the District Attorney who pursued the death penalty for Julius Jones in 1999. Background information and archive footage of Macy was featured in the 2018 documentary series The Last Defense.

== Corruption ==
Robert H. Macy is accused of conspiring with Joyce Gilchrist to commit forensic misconduct and fraud on multiple death penalty cases. Gilchrist's testimony was needed for 23 of Macy's death row convictions, many of which turned out to be false testimony and/or altered lab notes. David Autry, an Oklahoma County public defender who worked the courthouses while Macy was a District Attorney, said, "Macy would pretty much do whatever it took to win. He would routinely withhold exculpatory evidence, he engaged in prosecutorial misconduct routinely during trials and especially during closing argument. And even when the appellate court would slap him down, he would just continue on the same course.” The 2002 U.S. 10th Circuit Court of Appeals is quoted as saying “Macy’s persistent misconduct has without doubt harmed the reputation of Oklahoma’s criminal justice system and left the unenviable legacy of an indelibly tarnished legal career.”
