= James Norick =

American politician

Mayor of Oklahoma City
- In office April 7, 1959 – April 9, 1963
- Preceded by: Allen Street
- Succeeded by: Jack S. Wilkes
- In office April 11, 1967 – April 13, 1971
- Preceded by: George H. Shirk
- Succeeded by: Patience Latting

Personal details
- Born: James Henry Norick; January 23, 1920 Oklahoma City, Oklahoma
- Died: March 4, 2015 (aged 95) Oklahoma City, Oklahoma
- Party: Democratic
- Spouse: Madalynne King (m. 1940)
- Children: 3, including Ron
- Relatives: Lance Norick (grandson)
- Education: Oklahoma Military Academy

James Henry Norick (January 23, 1920 – March 4, 2015) was an American politician. He served as mayor of Oklahoma City, Oklahoma, from 1959 to 1963 and 1967 to 1971. He was a member of the Democratic party. Norick also served on Oklahoma City Council prior to serving as mayor, from 1951 to 1955. His son, Ron Norick, was also a mayor of Oklahoma City, serving from 1987 to 1998. He was the son of Henry Calvin and Ruth Norick. His father owned a printing business. James Norick attended the Oklahoma Military Academy and served in the United States Navy from 1942 to 1945. Norick died on March 4, 2015, at the age of 95.
