= Oklahoma State Fair =

Fair and exposition in Oklahoma City, Oklahoma

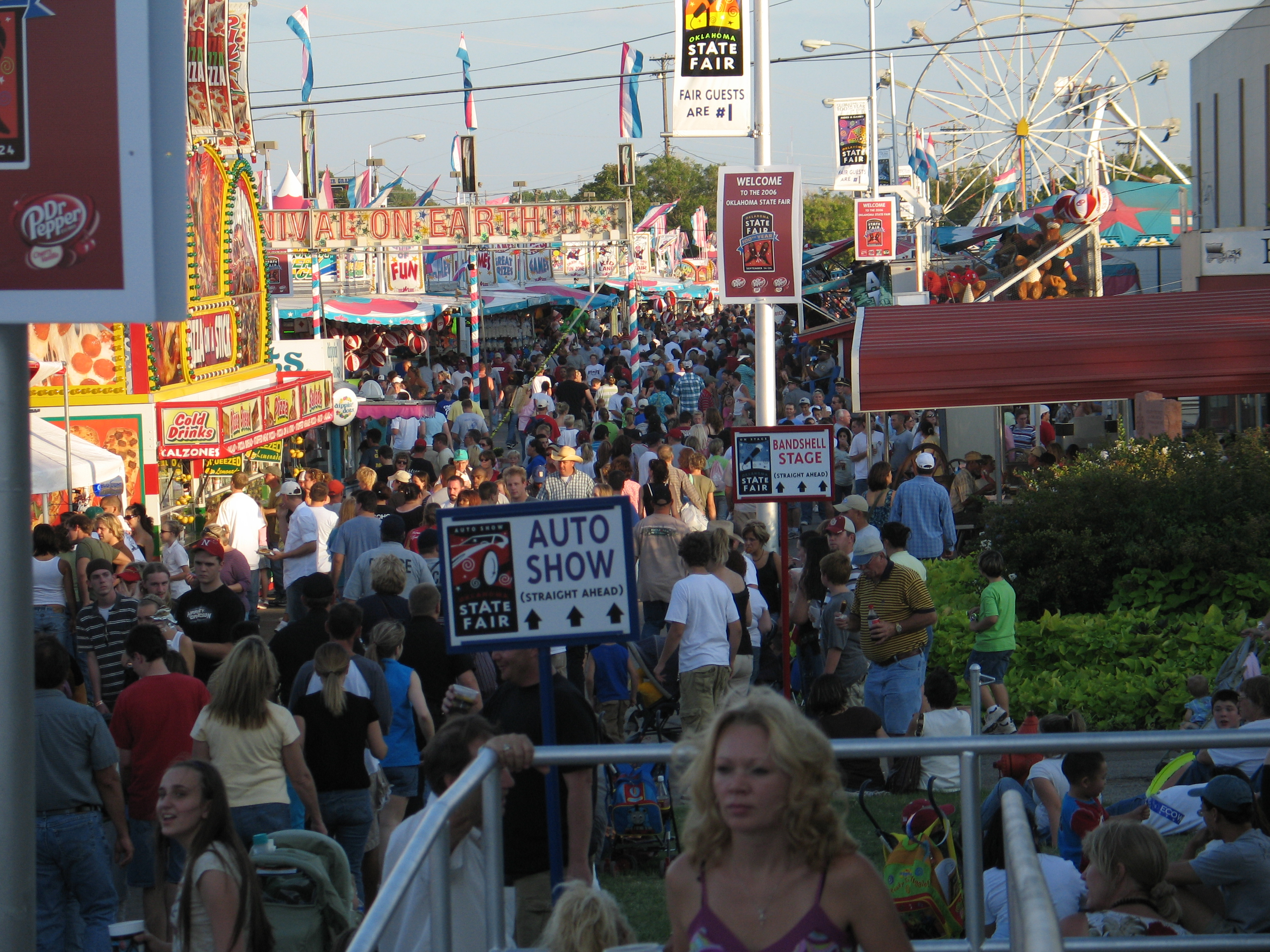
- Oklahoma State Fair in September 2006
- Genre: State fair
- Begins: Mid September
- Ends: Late September
- Frequency: Annually
- Locations: Oklahoma City, Oklahoma
- Coordinates: 35.474569°N 97.568938°W
- Years active: 1907–16; 1919–1944; 1946–2019; 2021–
- Inaugurated: 5 October 1907
- Founder: Charles G. Jones; Charles F. Colcord
- Attendance: 900,000
- Website: Official website

The Oklahoma State Fair is a fair and exposition in Oklahoma City, Oklahoma. It takes place in mid-September each year, and along with the Tulsa State Fair it is one of two state fairs in Oklahoma. During the eleven-day run, the Oklahoma State Fair attracts close to one million people. The fairgrounds also holds horse shows and rodeos.

The fair was not held in 1917, 1918, 1945, and 2020.

The fair was held for reasons of "morale" and patriotic and educational displays during WWII except 1945.

== See also ==
- Jim Norick Arena (formerly Fairgrounds Arena)
- Ulmus parvifolia 'State Fair'
