= Myriad Botanical Gardens =

Botanical garden in Oklahoma City, Oklahoma

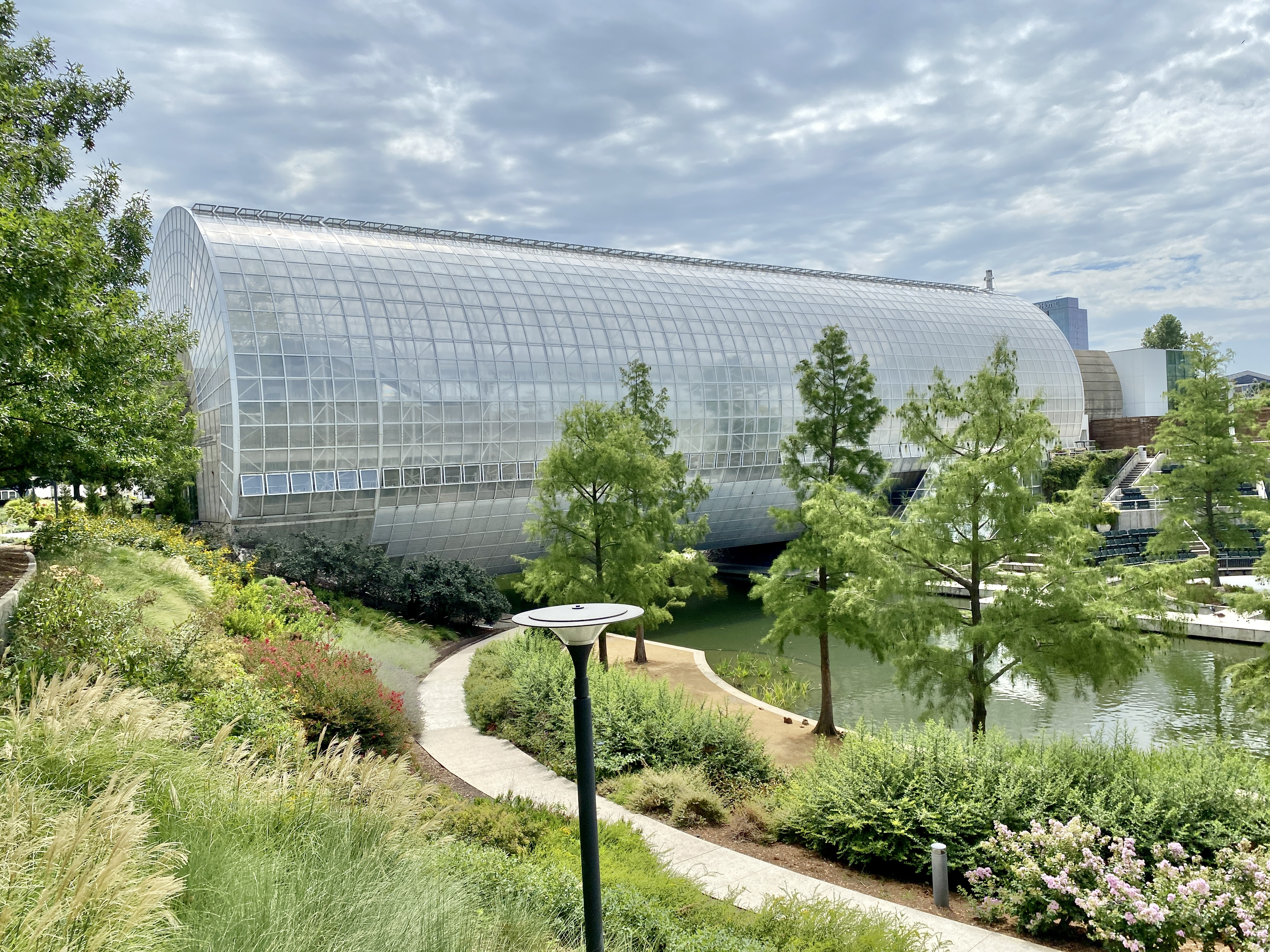
- Crystal Bridge Tropical Conservatory at the Myriad Botanical Gardens.
- Interactive map of Myriad Botanical Gardens
- Type: Botanical gardens
- Nearest city: Oklahoma City, Oklahoma
- Coordinates: 35.4652°N 97.5179°W
- Area: 15 acres (6.1 ha)
- Website: myriadgardens.org

Myriad Botanical Gardens is a 15-acre (6.1 ha) botanical garden in Downtown Oklahoma City, Oklahoma, United States. Visitors can explore the Inasmuch Foundation Crystal Bridge Conservatory, which features exterior grounds that are free to roam around.

== Arts and sculptures ==
The Myriad Botanical Gardens has several pieces of art. Gateway by Hans Van de Bovenkamp stands on a raised berm at the northwest corner of the Gardens. Childhood is Everlasting (1992) by Robin Orbach is installed in the southwest quadrant of the grounds. The Philodendron Dome is located on the northwest side of the lake and consists of a dome-shaped framework on an 8' × 9' base made of iron and bronze. Iron vines support the "dome" of this bronze plant's leaves, where visitors can enter for a view from underneath.

Flying Fish by Kenny McCage is a kinetic sculpture in the Gardens's east lake. Land of the Brave and the Free is a kinetic wind sculpture composed of bright colors and archetypal shapes. It is located on the west side of the Gardens. It was donated in 2002 to the Festival of the Arts by California artist Susan Pascal Beran. The Spirit Poles are adjacent to the north fountain plaza and were gifts to the City of Oklahoma City from the City of Tulsa in commemoration of Oklahoma's centennial of statehood in 2007.

== Annual events ==
- Oklahoma Gardening School: All-day gardening seminar featuring various speakers educating the public on a variety of Oklahoma-related gardening topics.
- Orchids in October: A three-day event celebrating orchids. An orchid sale and luncheon honoring the Foundation's Crystal Award recipient are part of the festivities.
- Downtown in December: The Gardens take part in Downtown Oklahoma City's "Downtown in December" event in late November. Twinkling lights on the place were set up for the event.
- The annual Oklahoma Gardening School is held typically during the first Saturday in March. It is an all-day seminar.

== Transportation ==
The Myriad Botanical Gardens is served by the Oklahoma City Streetcar at Myriad Gardens station.

| Preceding station | EMBARK | Following station |
|---|---|---|
| Scissortail Park One-way operation | Downtown Loop | Library Next clockwise |
| Scissortail Park One-way operation | Bricktown Loop | Century Center Next clockwise |

== Gallery ==
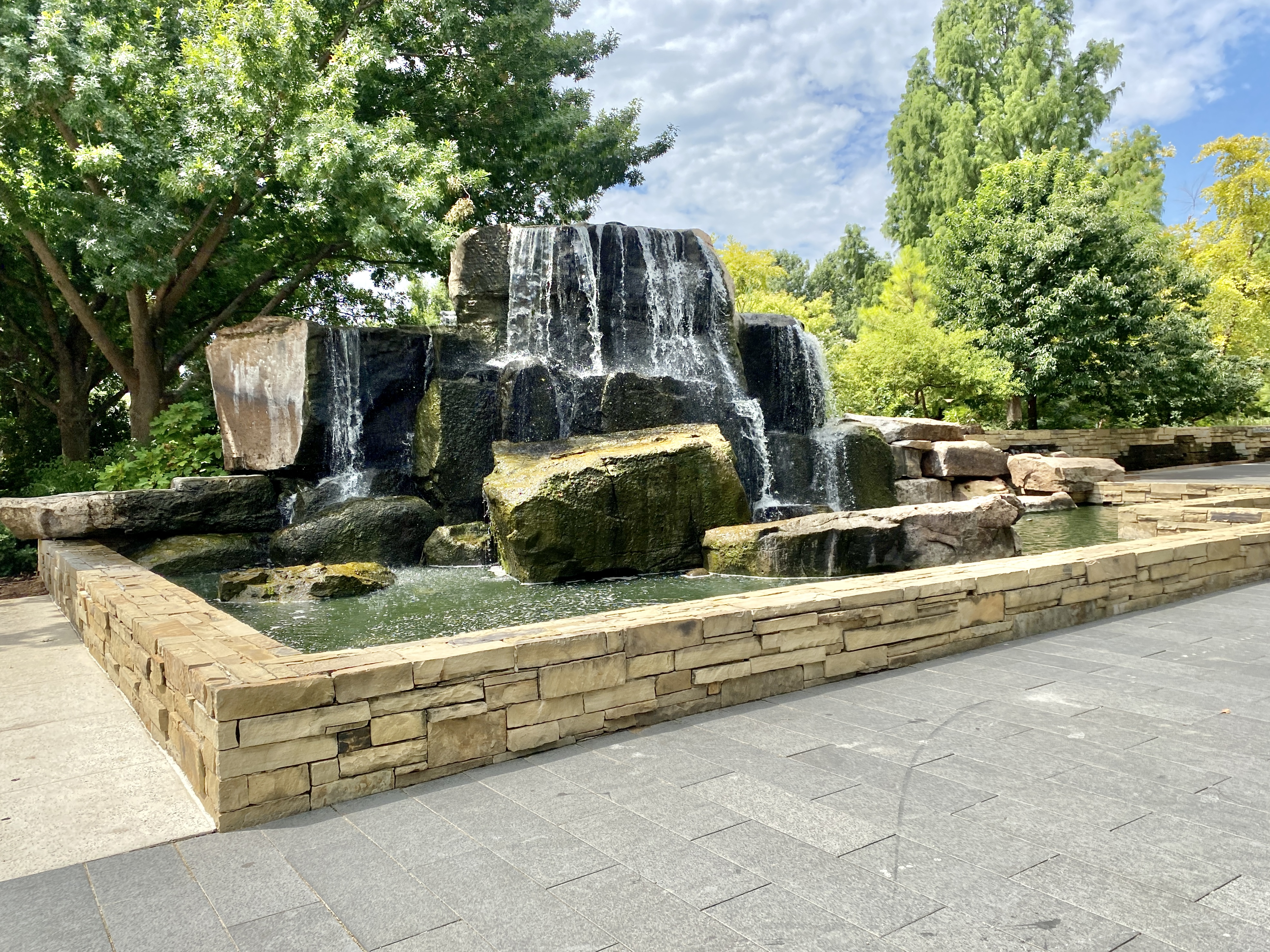
Entrance waterfall.

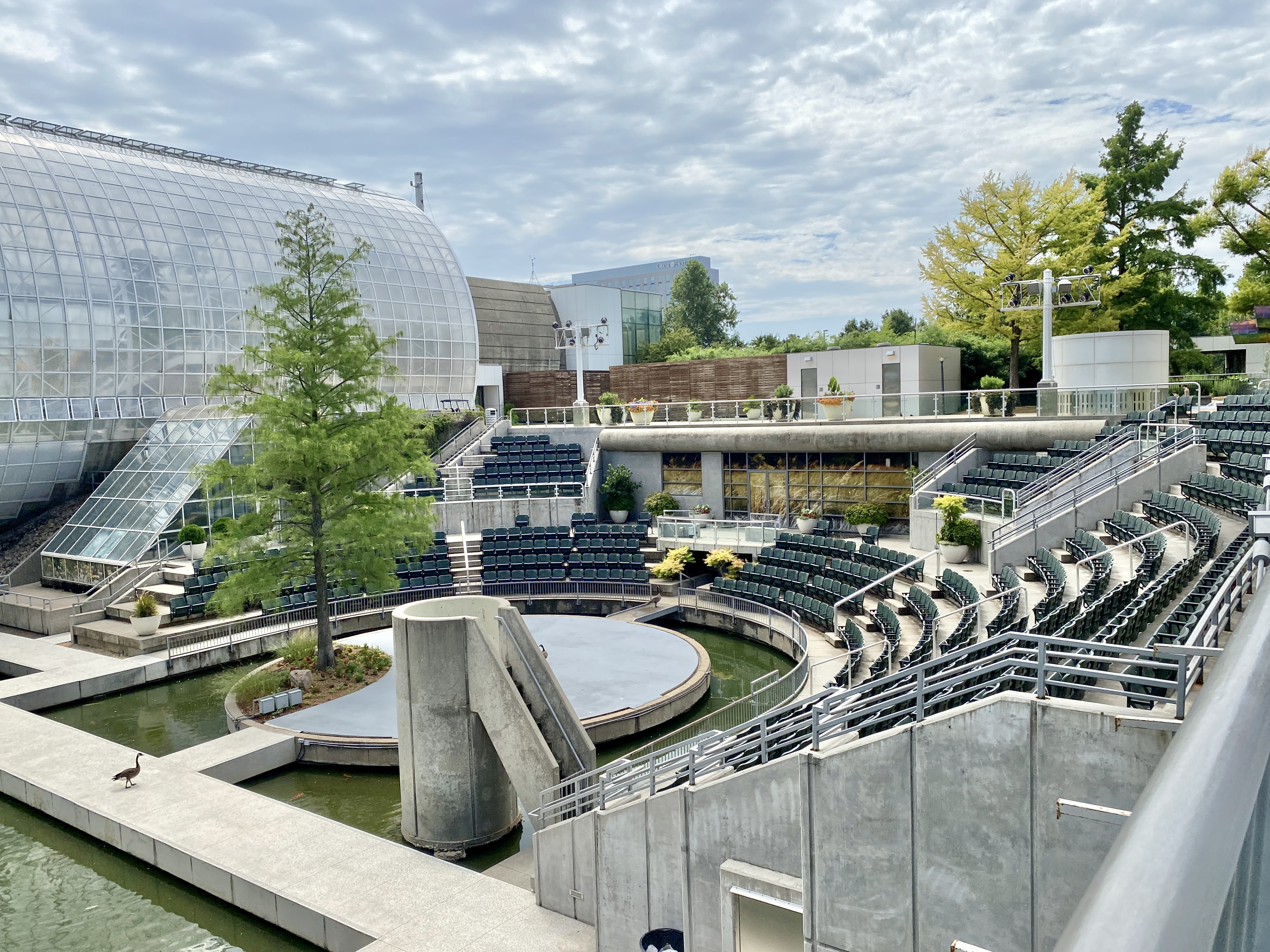
Amphitheater

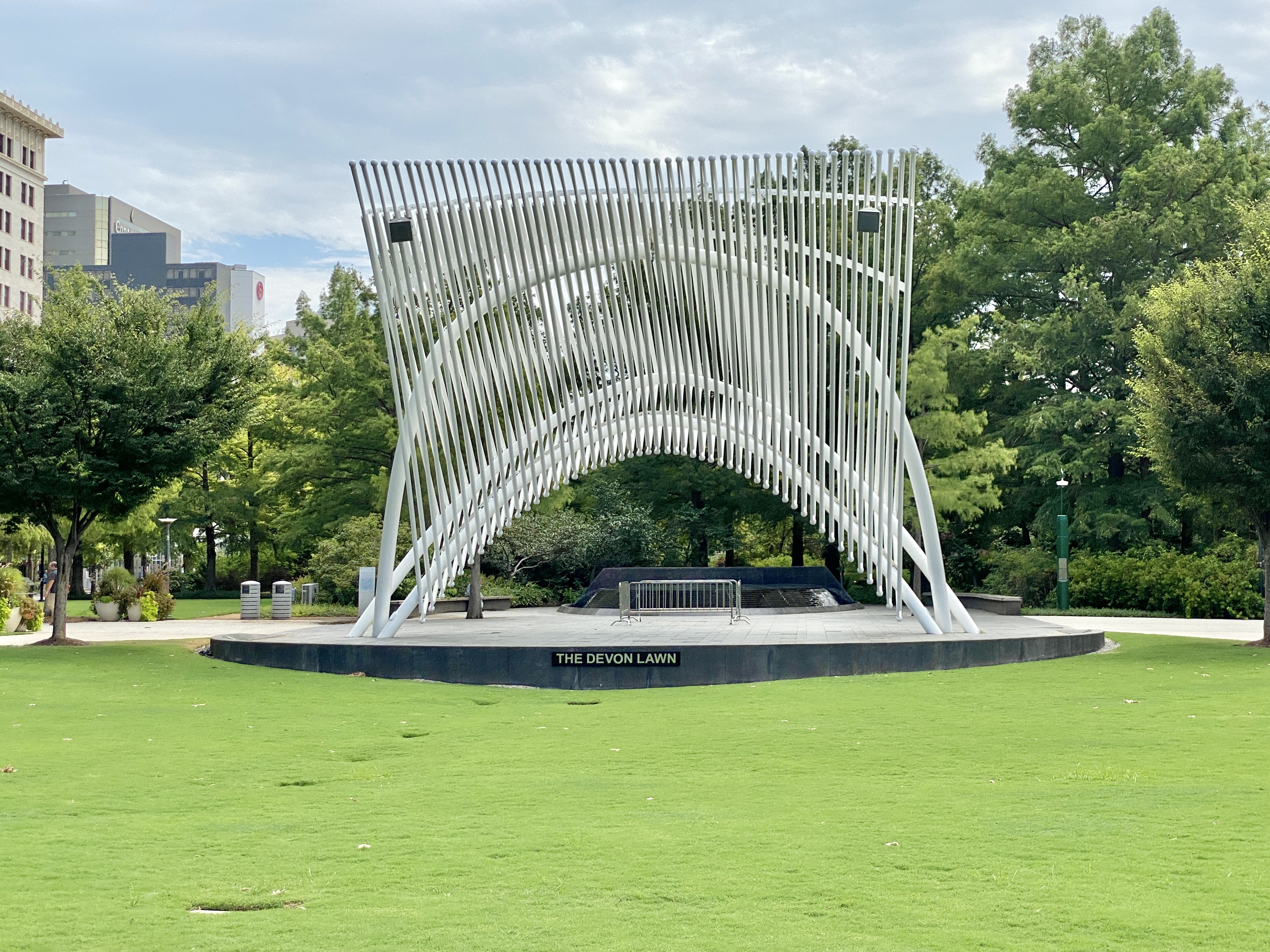
Bandshell

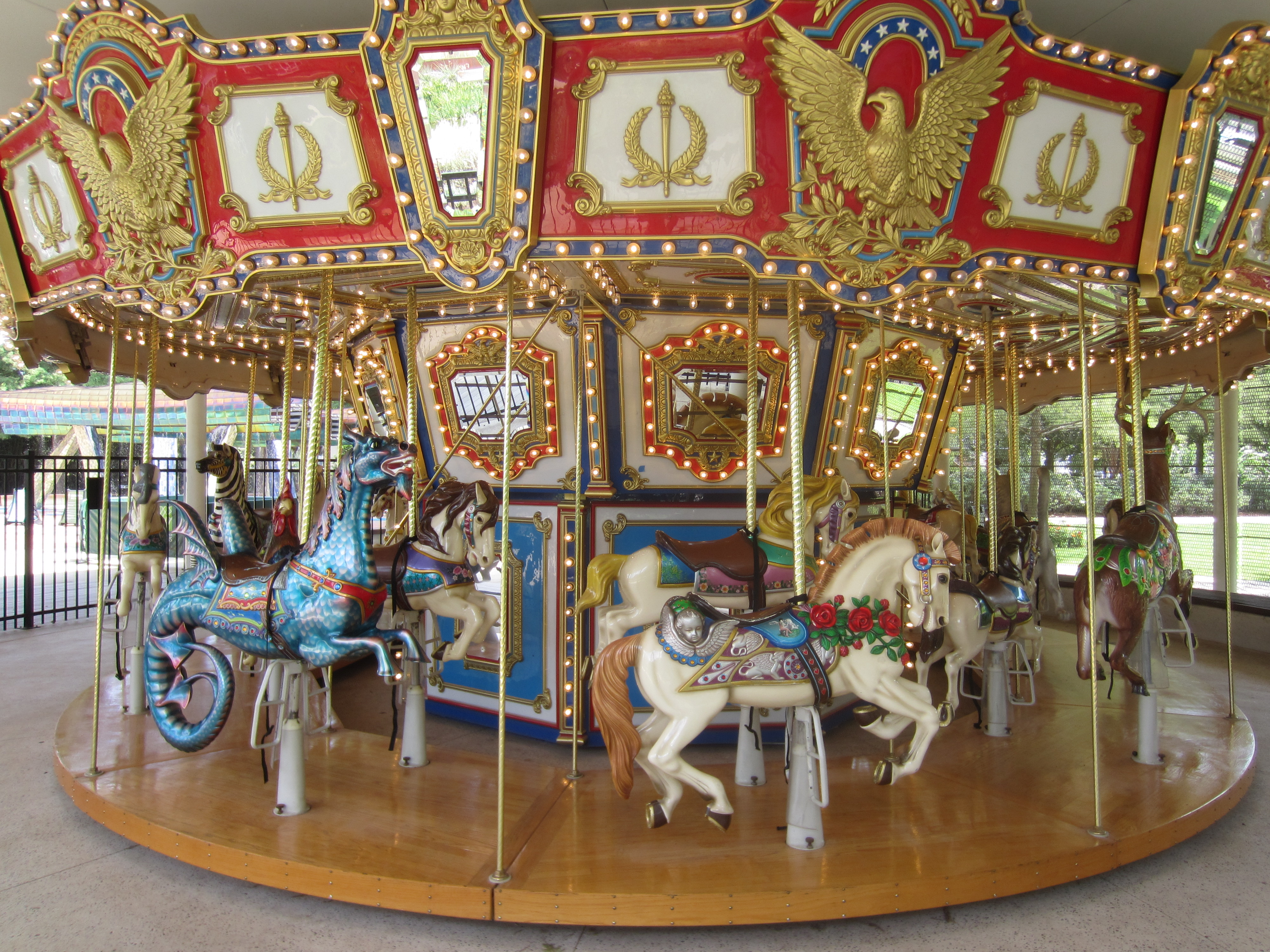
Carousel near the Children's Garden.

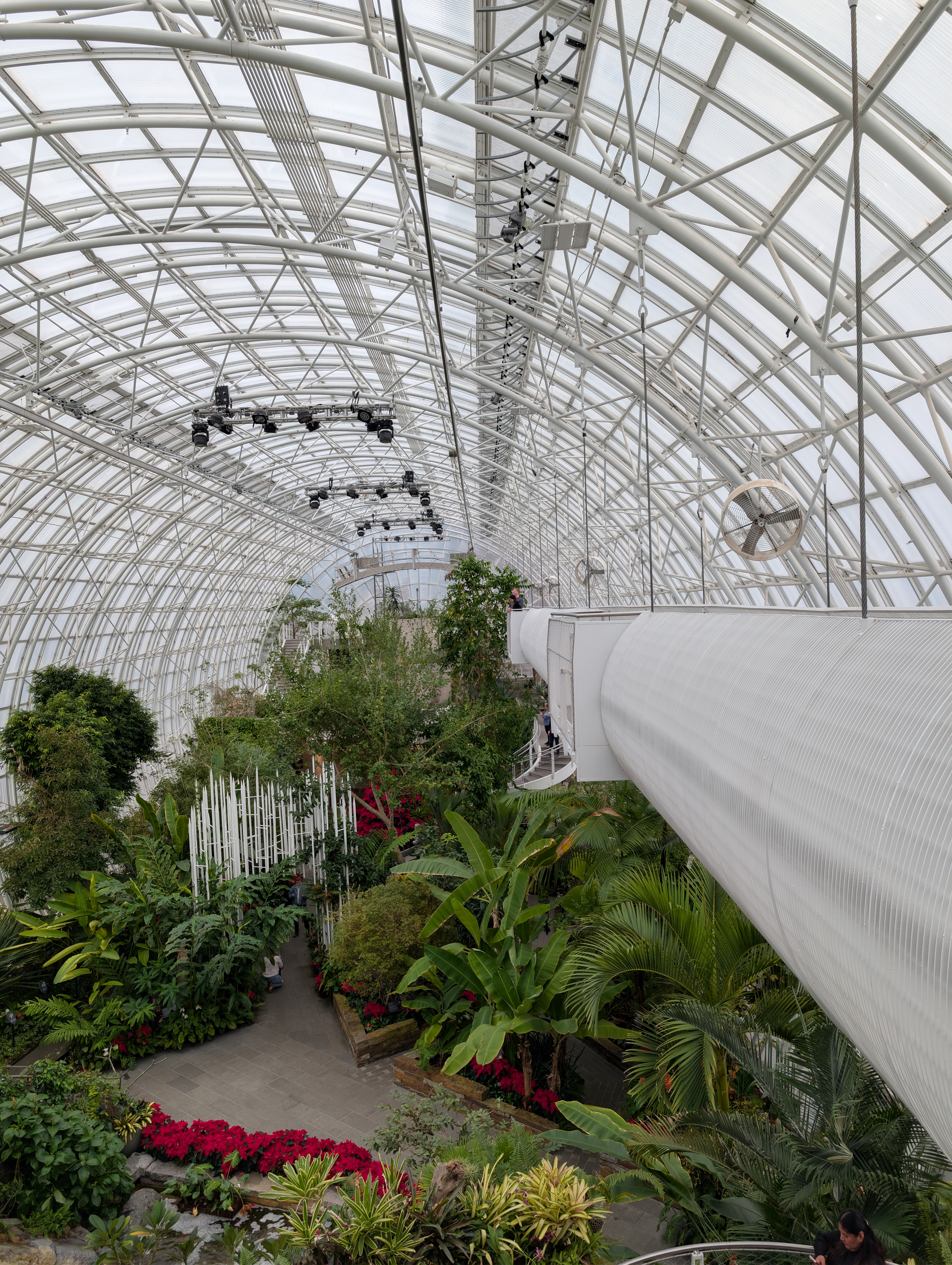
Crystal Bridge interior

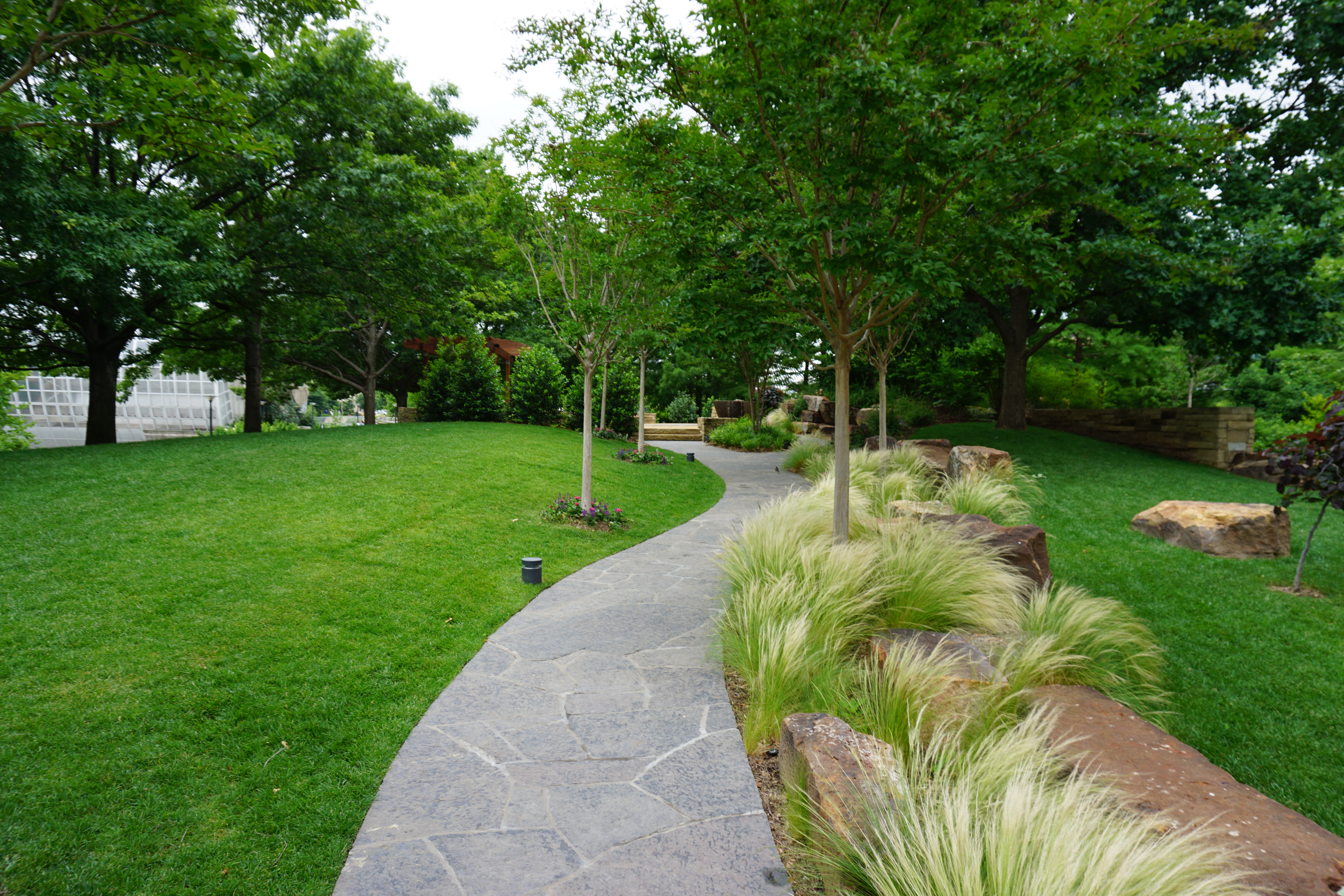
One of the pathways in the gardens.
