= 2014 United States Senate special election in Oklahoma =

- November 4, 2014
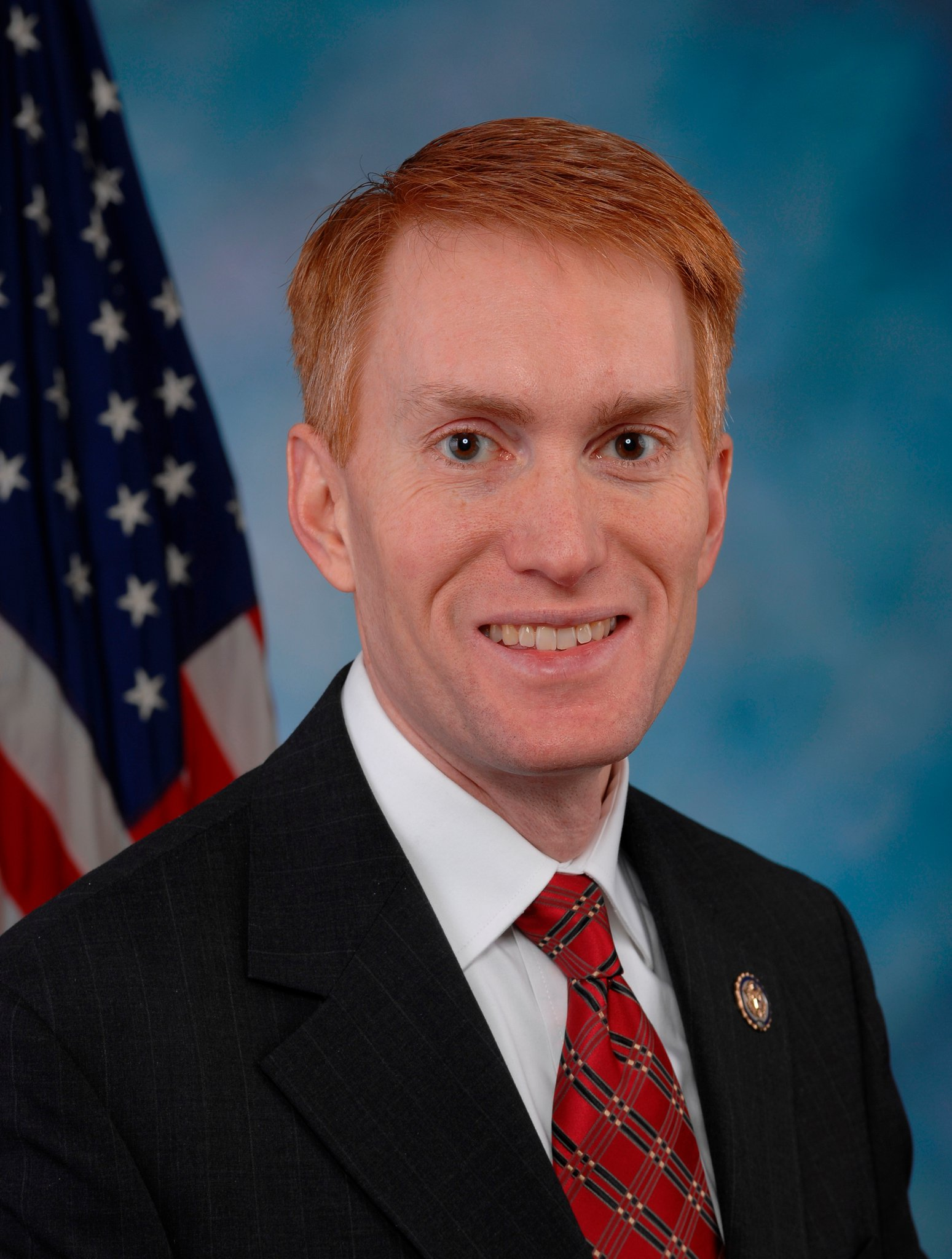

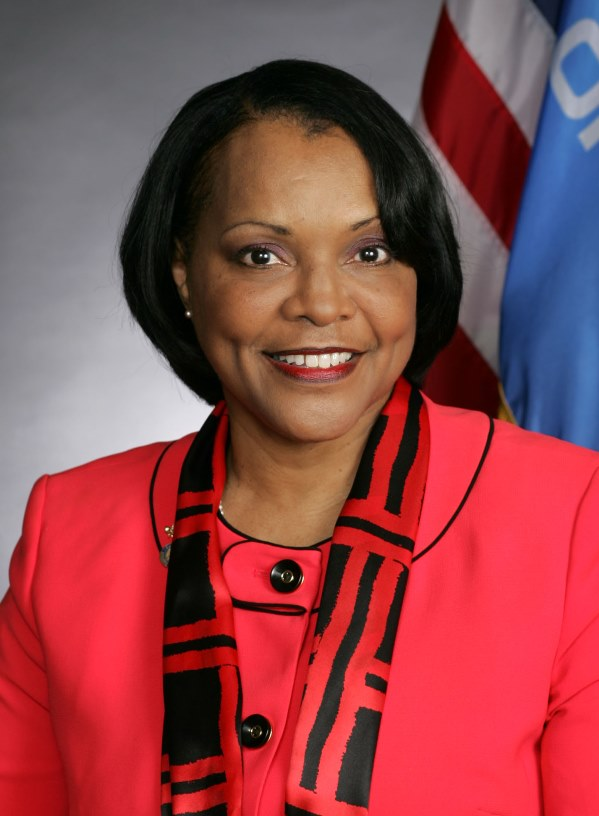
Nominee	James Lankford	Connie Johnson
Party	Republican	Democratic
Popular vote	557,002	237,923
Percentage	67.85%	28.98%
- County results Lankford: 50–60% 60–70% 70–80% 80–90%
U.S. senator before election
Tom Coburn
Republican
Elected U.S. Senator
James Lankford
Republican

The 2014 United States Senate special election in Oklahoma took place on November 4, 2014, to elect a member of the United States Senate to represent the State of Oklahoma, concurrently with the regularly-scheduled election to Oklahoma's other Senate seat, as well as other elections to the United States Senate in other states and elections to the United States House of Representatives and various state and local elections.

This special election was held to fill the remaining two years of incumbent Republican Senator Tom Coburn's second term. Coburn, a strong supporter of term limits, had announced even before he was elected to the Senate in 2004 that he would only serve for two terms. After he was re-elected in 2010, he reaffirmed that he would not run for re-election in 2016.

In January 2014, Coburn announced he would resign early at the end of the 113th United States Congress on January 3, 2015. As pursuant to Oklahoma law, he submitted an "irrevocable letter of resignation" to take effect on that day. Thus, the special election was held while he was still in office.

Unlike most states, except in very specific circumstances, (Note: "No special election shall be called if the vacancy occurs after March 1 of any even-numbered year if the term of the office expires the following year. In such case, the candidate elected to the office at the regular General Election shall be appointed by the Governor to fill the unexpired term.") Oklahoma Governor Mary Fallin did not have the power to appoint a replacement senator. Instead, state law required her to schedule the special election "as soon as practicable".

Primary elections were held on June 24, 2014. The Republicans nominated U.S. Representative James Lankford; as no candidate in the Democratic primary received more than 50% of the vote, a primary runoff election was held on August 26 between State Senator Connie Johnson and perennial candidate Jim Rogers, which Johnson won. In the general election, Lankford defeated Johnson in a landslide (winning every county) and was sworn in on the day Coburn's resignation took effect. When Lankford won re-election in 2016 and 2022, he won every county both times.

== Republican primary ==
By April 2014, Lankford and T.W. Shannon were seen as the main contenders for the Republican nomination, with Brogdon a potential spoiler who was running even further to the right than they did. Although there was reported to be "little daylight ideologically" between Lankford and Shannon, and both are associated with the Tea Party movement, Shannon attracted the support of figures including Ted Cruz, Mike Lee and Sarah Palin and organizations including FreedomWorks and the Senate Conservatives Fund. They criticized Lankford for his votes to raise the debt ceiling and for being a member of the Republican House leadership. Supporters of Lankford, including the chairman of the Oklahoma Republican Party, pointed out Shannon's ties to the establishment-supporting Congressman Tom Cole, accused Cruz, Lee, Palin and the others of being "outsiders" who were attempting to meddle in the state's primary, and also pointed out that the aforementioned had previously criticized Coburn, whom they were now praising in an attempt to woo him into supporting Shannon. Local Tea Party groups also criticised the national conservatives, saying in an open letter that they had endorsed Shannon without consulting them or examining his record, that Shannon was a "poser" who "had never stepped foot" in a Tea Party meeting before announcing his run for the Senate and "no longer attends grassroots meetings nor does he seek the grassroots support".

In June, Coburn responded to attack ads calling Lankford a "Washington insider" who "votes with liberals" by saying that "political advertisements by groups... supporting T.W. Shannon have crossed an important line — they simply aren't truthful and they mischaracterize James Lankford's service in Congress." He also called Lankford "a man of absolute integrity" who was "one of the most honest, thoughtful and sincere men I have met in my time in Washington." He also praised Lankford's "life experience", "perspective" and willingness to fight the "status quo", but stopped short of fully endorsing him. He did however say that "as a voter", the negative ads from pro-Shannon groups made him question Shannon's ability to govern.

By mid-June, Lankford was considered to have the momentum, a reversal of fortunes, though a runoff was considered likely. Shannon's negative advertisements were considered to have backfired, in contrast to Lankford's advertisements, which were largely positive. Lankford also raised and spent more money than Shannon, who was not significantly helped financially by national conservative groups, who had focused their attention on the primary runoff in Mississippi between incumbent senator Thad Cochran and conservative challenger Chris McDaniel. The runoff in Mississippi was held on the same day as the primary in Oklahoma and Alexandra Jaffe of The Hill reported that Shannon's best hope was to force a runoff, which would allow the national groups to refocus on Oklahoma. Outside spending for Shannon was $1.8m compared to $170,000 for Lankford but Lankford spent $1.8m to Shannon's $1.1m.

In what was considered a surprise result, Lankford defeated Shannon by over 20%, negating the need for a runoff. Lankford ran a strong, well-organised campaign, considered by Congressman Tom Cole to be "probably the best organization in the state that was operating at this time". He was also helped by his "existing statewide presence grounded in the state's burgeoning Baptist community", which goes back to his time before politics when he ran the Falls Creek Baptist Youth Camp, and the fact that his congressional district is based in Oklahoma City, where turnout was predicted to be high because there was also a competitive race in the Republican primary to succeed him. To attempt to counteract that, Shannon targeted the media market in Tulsa. Finally, unlike in other races, there was no split between the establishment and the Tea Party, with Shannon not capitalising on an "anti-establishment" wave that benefited others like Ben Sasse in Nebraska. Cole summarised: "We don't need people coming in and telling us who conservatives are, [because] everybody is a conservative. There are no moderates." State Senator David Holt, who supported Shannon, said that Coburn's comments about Lankford were the most important factor, saying that "Senator Coburn is enormously respected in Oklahoma, and when it appeared that he had a preference, I think that the voters listened."

=== Candidates ===
==== Declared ====
- Randy Brogdon, former state senator and candidate for Governor in 2010
- Andy Craig, Army Veteran and sales professional
- Kevin Crow, college professor
- James Lankford, U.S. Representative
- Eric McCray, businessman
- T. W. Shannon, state representative and former Speaker of the Oklahoma House of Representatives
- Jason Weger, paramedic

==== Declined ====
- Jim Bridenstine, U.S. Representative
- Tom Cole, U.S. Representative
- Patrice Douglas, State Corporation Commissioner and former mayor of Edmond (running for OK-05)
- Mary Fallin, Governor of Oklahoma
- Frank Keating, former governor of Oklahoma
- Todd Lamb, Lieutenant Governor of Oklahoma
- Frank Lucas, U.S. Representative
- Markwayne Mullin, U.S. Representative
- Scott Pruitt, Attorney General of Oklahoma
- J. C. Watts, former U.S. Representative

=== Endorsements ===
Randy Brogdon

Organizations

- Oklahoma Conservative PAC
- Tulsa Area Republicans Assembly
James Lankford

Individuals

- Trey Gowdy, United States Representative from South Carolina
- Mike Huckabee, former governor of Arkansas and candidate for President in 2008
- Darrell Issa, United States Representative from California

State Legislators

- Senator Rick Brinkley
- Senator Mike Mazzei
- Senator Dan Newberry
- Senator Gary Stanislawski
T.W. Shannon

Individuals

- Ben Carson, surgeon and speaker
- Ted Cruz, United States Senator from Texas
- Mike Lee, United States Senator from Utah
- Mark Levin, conservative radio host, author, and constitutional scholar
- Ken Miller, Oklahoma State Treasurer
- Sarah Palin, former governor of Alaska and 2008 Republican vice presidential nominee
- J. C. Watts, former U.S. Representative (OK-04)

Organizations

- The American Conservative Union
- Citizens United
- FreedomWorks
- GOPAC
- Senate Conservatives Fund

State Legislators

- Representative Don Armes
- Representative John Bennett
- Representative Gus Blackwell
- Representative David Brumbaugh
- Representative Dennis Casey
- Representative Mike Christian
- Representative Bobby Cleveland
- Representative Ann Coody
- Representative Lee Denney
- Representative David Derby
- Representative Jon Echols
- Representative Katie Henke
- Senator David Holt
- Representative Arthur Hulbert
- Representative Mike Jackson
- Representative Dennis Johnson
- Senator Rob Johnson
- Representative Charlie Joiner
- Representative Dan Kirby
- Senator Kyle Loveless
- Representative Scott Martin
- Representative Steve Martin
- Representative Charles McCall
- Representative Mark McCullough
- Representative Randy McDaniel
- Representative Skye McNiel
- Representative Lewis Moore
- Representative Jason Murphey
- Representative Tom Newell
- Representative Jadine Nollan
- Representative Terry O'Donnell
- Representative Leslie Osborn
- Representative Pat Ownbey
- Representative Pam Peterson
- Representative Marty Quinn
- Representative Dustin Roberts
- Representative Todd Russ
- Representative Mike Sanders
- Representative Colby Schwartz
- Representative Earl Sears
- Senator Ralph Shortey
- Representative Jason Smalley
- Representative Aaron Stiles
- Representative Todd Thomsen
- Representative John Trebilcock
- Representative Steve Vaughan
- Representative Ken Walker
- Representative Weldon Watson
- Representative Paul Wesselhoft
- Representative Justin Wood
- Representative Harold Wright
Declined to endorse
- Jim Bridenstine, U.S. Representative (OK-01)
- Tom Coburn, incumbent U.S. Senator
- Tom Cole, U.S. Representative (OK-04)
- Mary Fallin, Governor of Oklahoma
- Jim Inhofe, U.S. Senator (OK)
- Frank Lucas, U.S. Representative (OK-03)
- Markwayne Mullin, U.S. Representative (OK-02)

=== Polling ===
Poll source	Date(s) administered	Sample size	Margin of error	Randy Brogdon	Andy Craig	Kevin Crow	James Lankford	Eric McCray	T.W. Shannon	J. C. Watts	Jason Weger	Other	Undecided
Harper Polling	January 30 – February 1, 2014	627	± 3.91%	—	—	—	37%	—	8%	40%	2%	—	13%
Harper Polling	January 30 – February 1, 2014	627	± 3.91%	—	—	—	54%	—	18%	—	1%	—	27%
Tarrance Group*	February 10–12, 2014	500	± 4.9%	—	—	3%	47%	—	17%	—	—	—	33%
Public Opinion Strategies	February 9–11, 2014	?	± ?	—	—	—	51%	—	16%	—	—	1%	32%
Public Opinion Strategies	March 16–17, 2014	500	± 4.38%	7%	—	—	37%	—	28%	—	—	3%	25%
Public Opinion Strategies	April 21–22, 2014	500	± 4.48%	7%	—	—	32%	—	42%	—	—	3%	16%
NSON Opinion Strategy	April 23–29, 2014	400	± ?	3.5%	1%	0.3%	30.8%	—	32%	—	—	1.0%	32.5%
American Viewpoint	April 27–29, 2014	?	± ?	—	—	—	36%	—	34%	—	—	?	?
SoonerPoll	May 5–10, 2014	580	± 4.07%	4.5%	0.6%	1.7%	33.8%	0.6%	31.9%	—	1.5%	—	25.4%
Tarrance Group*	May 12–14, 2014	501	± 4.5%	5%	—	—	43%	—	33%	—	—	—	18%
American Viewpoint	May 27–29, 2014	500	± 4.4%	4%	—	—	48%	—	26%	—	—	3%	18%
Public Opinion Strategies	June 7–9, 2014	600	± 4.81%	—	—	—	39%	—	37%	—	—	6%	18%
Tarrance Group*	June 9–11, 2014	500	± 4.5%	—	—	—	41%	—	34%	—	—	7%	18%
SoonerPoll	June 14–18, 2014	415	± 4.81%	3%	—	—	41%	—	38%	—	—	2%	16%
SoonerPoll	June 19–21, 2014	840	± 3.38%	4.2%	0.4%	1.4%	43.4%	0.9%	34.9%	—	1.5%	—	13.3%

- * Internal poll for James Lankford campaign
Hypothetical runoff polling

Poll source	Date(s) administered	Sample size	Margin of error	Randy Brogdon	James Lankford	Undecided
NSON Opinion Strategy	April 23–29, 2014	400	± ?	10.2%	50%	39.8%

Poll source	Date(s) administered	Sample size	Margin of error	James Lankford	T.W. Shannon	Undecided
NSON Opinion Strategy	April 23–29, 2014	400	± ?	30.2%	38.2%	31.5%

=== Results ===
Results by county Lankford: 40–50%; 50–60%; 60–70%; 70–80%; Shannon: 40–50%; 50–60%; 70–80%

Republican primary results
Party	Candidate	Votes	%
Republican	James Lankford	152,749	57.24%
Republican	T. W. Shannon	91,854	34.42%
Republican	Randy Brogdon	12,934	4.85%
Republican	Kevin Crow	2,828	1.06%
Republican	Andy Craig	2,427	0.91%
Republican	Eric McCray	2,272	0.85%
Republican	Jason Weger	1,794	0.67%
Total votes		266,858	100.00%

== Democratic primary ==
=== Candidates ===
==== Declared ====
- Patrick Hayes
- Connie Johnson, state senator
- Jim Rogers, perennial candidate and nominee for the U.S. Senate in 2010

==== Withdrew ====
- Charles Jenkins, retired federal employee

==== Declined ====
- Bill Anoatubby, Governor of the Chickasaw Nation
- Jari Askins, former lieutenant governor of Oklahoma and nominee for governor in 2010
- Dan Boren, former U.S. Representative
- Clark Brewster, attorney
- Kenneth Corn, former state senator and nominee for lieutenant governor in 2010
- Drew Edmondson, former attorney general of Oklahoma and candidate for governor in 2010
- Kathy Taylor, former mayor of Tulsa

=== Endorsements ===
Connie Johnson

Individuals

- Jesse Jackson, civil rights activist and Baptist minister

Organizations

- Oklahoma AFL–CIO
- City Sentinel, newspaper
- Tulsa World, newspaper
- NORML, marijuana-advocacy organization
- Oklahoma Democratic Party, the Oklahoma Central Committee of the Oklahoma Democratic Party endorsed Johnson over Rogers

=== Polling ===
Poll source	Date(s) administered	Sample size	Margin of error	Patrick Hayes	Connie Johnson	Jim Rogers	Other	Undecided
SoonerPoll	May 5–10, 2014	631	± 3.9%	5%	9.2%	9.4%	—	76.3%
SoonerPoll	June 19–21, 2014	781	± 3.5%	6.4%	13.2%	5.4%	—	75.1%

=== Results ===
Results by county Johnson: 30–40%; 40–50%; 50–60%; 70–80%; Rogers: 30–40%; 40–50%; 50–60%; Hayes: 30–40%

Democratic primary results
Party	Candidate	Votes	%
Democratic	Constance N. Johnson	71,462	43.84%
Democratic	Jim Rogers	57,598	35.34%
Democratic	Patrick Hayes	33,943	20.82%
Total votes		163,003	100.00%

=== Runoff ===
Results by county Johnson: 50–60%; 60–70%; 70–80%; 80–90%; Rogers: 50–60%; 60–70%

Democratic primary runoff results
Party	Candidate	Votes	%
Democratic	Constance N. Johnson	54,762	57.99%
Democratic	Jim Rogers	39,664	42.01%
Total votes		94,426	100.00%

== Independents ==
=== Candidates ===
==== Declared ====
- Mark Beard

== General election ==
=== Debates ===
- Complete video of debate, October 7, 2014

=== Predictions ===
Source	Ranking	As of
The Cook Political Report	Solid R	November 3, 2014
Sabato's Crystal Ball	Safe R	November 3, 2014
Rothenberg Political Report	Safe R	November 3, 2014
Real Clear Politics	Safe R	November 3, 2014

=== Polling ===
Poll source	Date(s) administered	Sample size	Margin of error	James Lankford (R)	Connie Johnson (D)	Other	Undecided
CBS News/NYT/YouGov	July 5–24, 2014	1,302	± 4.7%	56%	34%	6%	5%
Rasmussen	August 27–28, 2014	750	± 4%	58%	29%	6%	7%
Sooner Poll	August 28–30, 2014	603	± 3.99%	58%	28%	3%	11%
CBS News/NYT/YouGov	August 18 – September 2, 2014	821	± 5%	61%	28%	1%	10%
Sooner Poll	September 27–29, 2014	400	± 4.9%	56%	28%	4%	12%
CBS News/NYT/YouGov	September 20 – October 1, 2014	1,244	± 3%	65%	24%	0%	11%
CBS News/NYT/YouGov	October 16–23, 2014	995	± 5%	63%	29%	0%	8%
Sooner Poll	October 25–29, 2014	949	± 3.18%	59%	28%	4%	9%

=== Results ===
United States Senate special election in Oklahoma, 2014
Party	Candidate	Votes	%	±%
Republican	James Lankford	557,002	67.85%	−2.79%
Democratic	Connie Johnson	237,923	28.98%	+2.85%
Independent	Mark T. Beard	25,965	3.17%	N/A
Total votes		820,890	100.00%	N/A
Republican hold				

== See also ==
- 2014 United States Senate elections
- 2014 United States elections
- 2014 United States Senate election in Oklahoma
- 2014 United States House of Representatives elections in Oklahoma
- 2014 Oklahoma gubernatorial election
