= 2014 Oklahoma lieutenant gubernatorial election =

- November 4, 2014
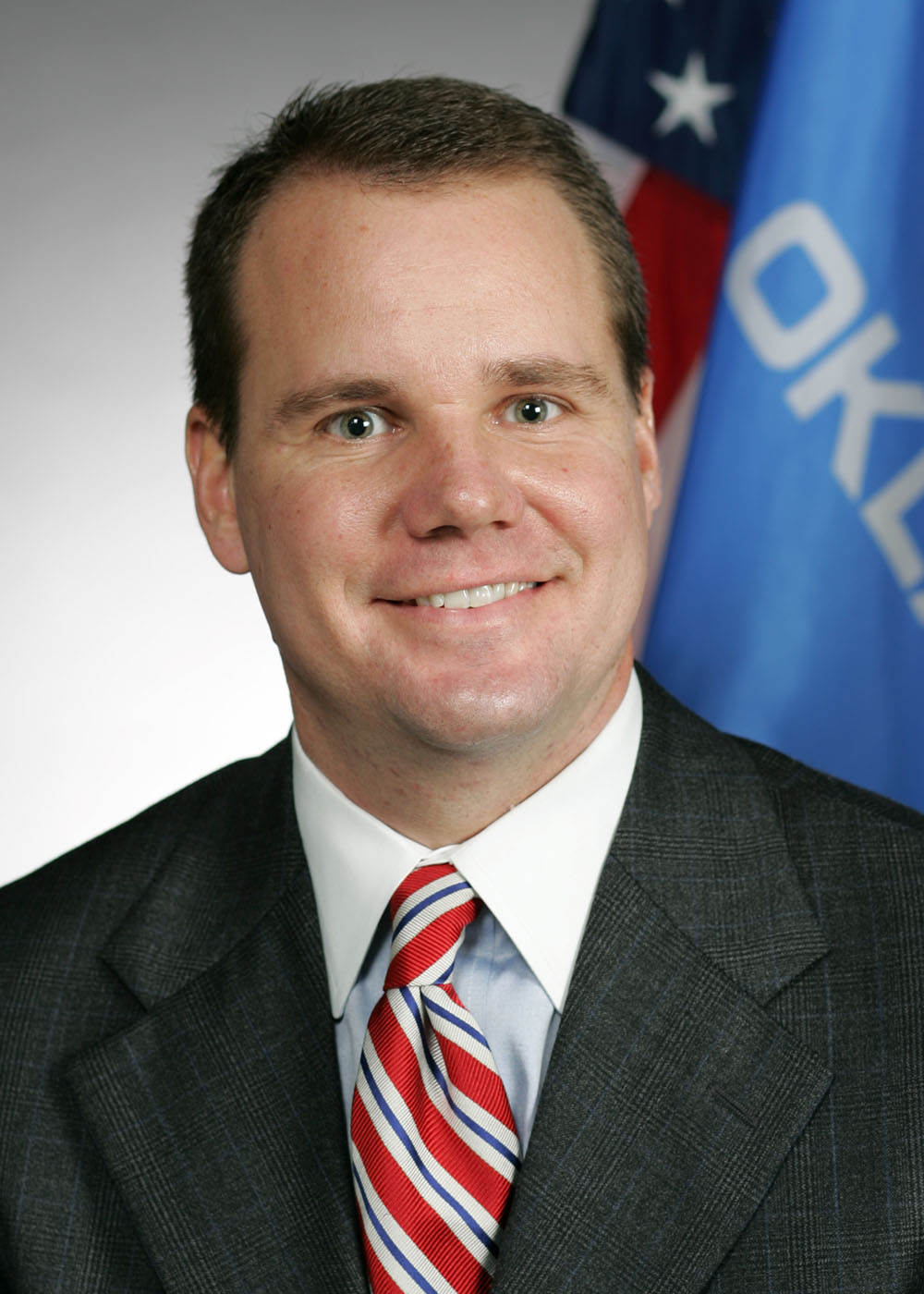

Nominee	Todd Lamb	Cathy Cummings
Party	Republican	Democratic
Popular vote	562,088	258,564
Percentage	68.49%	31.51%
- County results Lamb: 50–60% 60–70% 70–80% 80–90% >90%
Lieutenant Governor before election
Todd Lamb
Republican
Elected Lieutenant Governor
Todd Lamb
Republican

The 2014 Oklahoma lieutenant gubernatorial election was held on November 2, 2010, to elect the Lieutenant Governor of Oklahoma, concurrently with elections to the United States Senate, including a special election, U.S. House of Representatives, governor, and other state and local elections. Primary elections were held on June 24, 2014, with runoff elections held on August 26 in races where no single candidate cleared at least 50% of the vote.

Incumbent Republican lieutenant governor Todd Lamb won re-election in a landslide.

== Republican primary ==
=== Candidates ===
==== Nominee ====
- Todd Lamb, incumbent lieutenant governor (2011–present)

=== Results ===
Republican primary results
Party	Candidate	Votes	%
Republican	Todd Lamb (incumbent)	Unopposed	
Total votes		—N/a	100.0

== Democratic primary ==
=== Candidates ===
==== Nominee ====
- Cathy Cummings, restaurant owner

=== Results ===
Democratic primary results
Party	Candidate	Votes	%
Democratic	Cathy Cummings	Unopposed	
Total votes		—N/a	100.0

== General election ==
=== Post-primary endorsements ===
Todd Lamb (R)

Newspapers and other media

- The Oklahoman

=== Results ===
2014 Oklahoma lieutenant gubernatorial election
Party	Candidate	Votes	%
Republican	Todd Lamb (incumbent)	562,088	68.49
Democratic	Cathy Cummings	258,564	31.51
Total votes		820,652	100.0
Republican hold			
