= Constance N. Johnson =

American politician (born 1952)

Connie Johnson
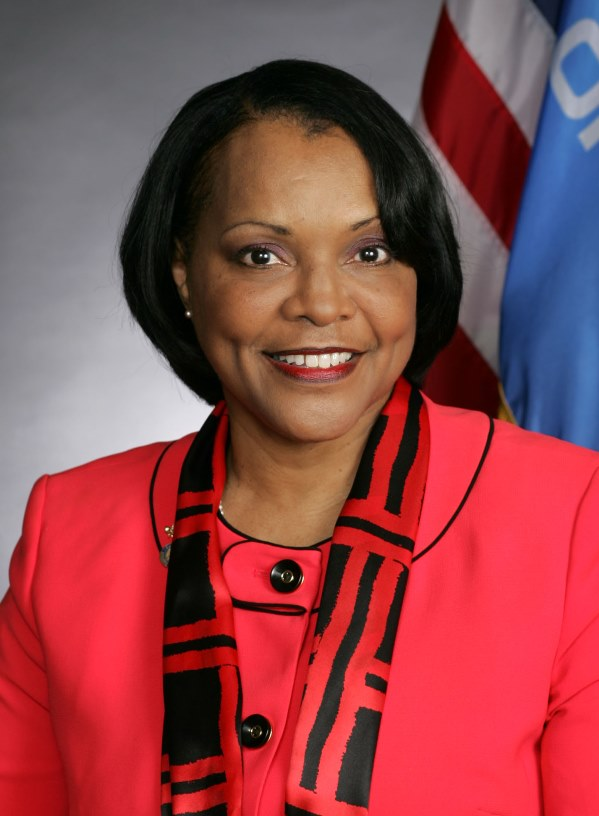
- Official portrait, 2010

Member of the Oklahoma Senate from the 48th district
- In office November 26, 2005 – November 2014
- Preceded by: Angela Monson
- Succeeded by: Anastasia Pittman

Personal details
- Born: Constance Nevlin Johnson; May 11, 1952 (age 74) Holdenville, Oklahoma, U.S.
- Party: Democratic
- Education: University of Pennsylvania (BA); Langston University (MS)

Constance Nevlin Johnson (born May 11, 1952) is an American politician who served in the Oklahoma Senate representing the 48th district from 2005 to 2014. She was the first African American woman nominated for a major statewide office in Oklahoma and the first woman United States Senate nominee from Oklahoma.

Johnson was first elected to the state senate representing northeastern and northwestern Oklahoma County in a special election in September 2005 and she served in office until she retired to run for the United States Senate in 2014, losing the general election to James Lankford. She ran for Governor of Oklahoma in 2018, 2022 and 2026, losing in the Democratic primary each time. In 2024, she campaigned for her former state senate seat, but lost the Democratic primary to Nikki Nice.

== Early life and education ==
Born in Holdenville, Oklahoma, in 1952, she graduated from Frederick A. Douglass High School in Oklahoma City and earned a bachelor's degree in French from the University of Pennsylvania, where she also completed coursework for a Masters of Science in Education. After college she worked for the Oklahoma Community Action Director's Association, the Comprehensive Employment and Training Act (CETA) within the City of Oklahoma City, and as the personnel assistant within the General Administrator's office of the Oklahoma Corporation Commission. She graduated from Langston University's master's in Rehabilitation Counseling Program and holds a doctorate in political science from Larry Love University.

== Career in the Oklahoma State Senate ==
Johnson worked for the Oklahoma State Senate as a legislative analyst from 1981 to 2005 when she won the Senate seat representing District 48 in a special election. She was re-elected in 2006 and 2010.

=== Stance on Senate Bill 1433 ===
Senate Bill 1433, which sought to define human life as beginning at fertilization, would have offered full legal protection to all human embryos. In the words of the bill, “the unborn child at every stage of development (has) all the rights, privileges, and immunities available to other persons, citizens, and residents of this state.” Johnson submitted an amendment of her own to the bill, which would have added the words:

However, any action in which a man ejaculates or otherwise deposits semen anywhere but in a woman’s vagina shall be interpreted and construed as an action against an unborn child.

She explained that the amendment was intended to "draw attention to the absurdity, duplicity and lack of balance inherent in the policies of this state in regard to women". Her efforts were used as part of a skit that was featured on the Daily Show with Jon Stewart entitled "Bro Choice," and, in conjunction with a rally organized by the newly created Oklahoma Coalition for Reproductive Justice, led to the defeat of the proposed legislation. At the rally, Johnson was joined by fellow state senator Judy Eason McIntyre, who was pictured holding up a protest sign that read "If I wanted the government in my womb, I'd fuck a senator."

== 2014 Campaign for U.S. Senate ==
On April 8, 2014, Johnson announced she was running in the 2014 United States Senate special election in Oklahoma. Johnson faced Patrick Hayes and perennial candidate Jim Rogers. Johnson finished first in the Democratic primary with a plurality, and faced Rogers in a runoff election. Rogers had an advantage with name recognition heading into the runoff election, having appeared numerous times on the ballot in Oklahoma. Johnson, having spent 8 years in the Oklahoma State Senate as an outspoken critic of the Republican legislature, was able to acquire experienced campaign staff to secure a runoff election victory. Controversy would later surround a successful lawsuit with Johnson staff member Rico Smith. Smith filed a suit claiming Johnson did not properly pay him according to a contract signed by Johnson's campaign staff. That suit was sustained by the court. Campaign Manager Bailey Perkins, succeeded by Colletta Harper, along with Communications Director James Cooper, an Oklahoma City journalist and professor, and Political Director David Roberts, a veteran political operative and former 2008 Obama for America staff member rounded out the organizational structure. Rogers' name recognition did little to combat Johnson's growing notoriety and campaign organization. Johnson won the runoff election, defeating Rogers by 14 percentage points, to face Rep. James Lankford in the general election campaign. She was the first African American woman nominated for a major statewide office in Oklahoma and the first woman US Senate nominee from Oklahoma.

Johnson lost the election for the unexpired term of Tom Coburn to James Lankford, by a margin of 237,923 29.0% to Lankford's 557,002, 67.9%, with independent candidate Mark Beard collecting 25,965 votes, 3.2% of the total. Oklahoma had the lowest voter turnout in the country in the 2014 midterm elections with only 29% of registered voters casting a ballot.

== Vice chair of the Oklahoma Democratic Party ==
Johnson was elected vice chair of the Oklahoma Democratic Party (ODP) in May 2015 based on her belief that the party should do more to increase voting participation using specific voting strategies and more voter education. She supported the decision to allow independents to participate in the Democratic primary and has worked to re-invigorate the process for clubs representing diverse groups to have a voice on the ODP Central Committee. She was the whistle blower on what she considers a “gag order” that prohibited Democrats from discussing key Democratic issues such as women's reproductive health rights, immigration, death penalty abolition, and marijuana policy reform.

== Later campaigns ==
=== 2018 gubernatorial campaign ===
Johnson ran unsuccessfully for the Democratic nomination for Governor of Oklahoma in 2018. She won 38.6% of votes to elect a Democratic candidate for governor in the Oklahoma statewide primary held on June 26, 2018, losing to former Oklahoma attorney general Drew Edmondson who won 61.4% of votes.

=== 2022 gubernatorial campaign ===
On May 17, 2021, Johnson filed to run for governor once again in 2022, to challenge Republican incumbent Kevin Stitt. On June 28, 2022, Johnson lost the Democratic primary to Oklahoma Superintendent of Public Instruction Joy Hofmeister.

=== 2024 Oklahoma Senate campaign ===
Johnson ran for the Oklahoma Senate's 48th district in 2024 and faced a Democratic primary against Oklahoma City Councilor Nikki Nice. Johnson lost the primary election to Nice.

=== 2026 gubernatorial campaign ===
Johnson filed to run for governor in the 2026 Oklahoma gubernatorial election, seeking the Democratic nomination. She came second behind Cyndi Munson, who defeated Johnson by 129,152 votes (74.9%) to 38,393 (22.3%).

== Political positions ==
Johnson has been a member of the Democratic Socialists of America.

=== Marijuana ===
In June 2014, Senator Johnson announced the filing of an initiative petition for a proposed amendment to the Constitution of Oklahoma which would legalize the possession of up to one ounce of recreational marijuana and three ounces of medical marijuana. According to Johnson, "We’re putting forth Genesis 1:29 as the basis of this campaign. God created this wonderful, miraculous plant and we know that it has been vilified for the last 100 years, and it’s time to change that in Oklahoma."

=== Death penalty ===
Elected to chair the Oklahoma Coalition to Abolish the Death Penalty (OK-CADP) in 2015 and again in 2016, Johnson led the Say No To SQ 776/Think Twice Oklahoma campaign to keep the death penalty out of Oklahoma's state constitution. The state question passed with overwhelming with 66% of the vote.

== See also ==
- List of Democratic Socialists of America who have held office in the United States
- List of African-American United States Senate candidates

Party political offices
Preceded by Jim Rogers	Democratic nominee for U.S. senator from Oklahoma (Class 3); 2014	Succeeded by Mike Workman
