= Anthony More =

Anthony More may refer to:

- Antonis Mor (c. 1517–c. 1577), Dutch portrait painter
- Anthony Moor (born 1993), Zimbabwean cricketer
- Anthony Moore, American politician
- Anthony Moore (born 1948), British musician
