= Ajay Pittman =

American politician (born 1993)

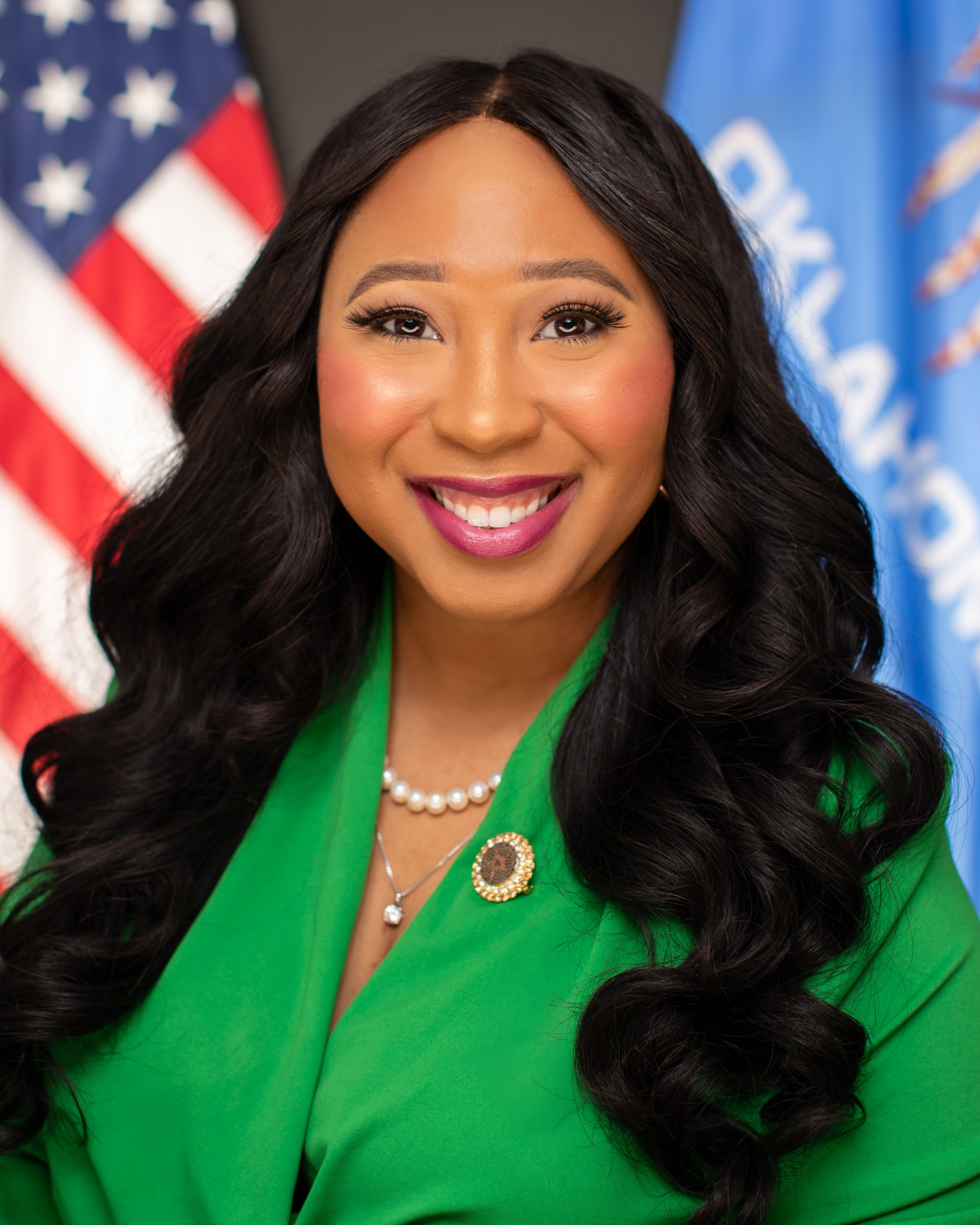

Member of the Oklahoma House of Representatives from the 99th district
- In office November 2018 – January 28, 2026
- Preceded by: George E. Young
- Succeeded by: Herschel Brown

Personal details
- Born: Ayshia K. M. Pittman; September 10, 1993 (age 33)
- Party: Democratic
- Parent: Anastasia Pittman (mother)

Ayshia K. M. Pittman (born September 10, 1993) is a Seminole-American politician who served as a member of the Oklahoma House of Representatives representing the 99th district as a member of the Democratic Party from 2018 to 2026. She was the third Seminole to serve in the Oklahoma Legislature.

== Early life ==
Ayshia K. M. Pittman was born on September 10, 1993, to Anastasia Pittman, who served in the Oklahoma House of Representatives from the 99th district and in the Oklahoma Senate. Pittman is a member of the Seminole Nation of Oklahoma, and is the great-great-granddaughter of Abner Burnett, who survived the Tulsa race massacre. Pittman attended the University of Oklahoma and studied at the Oklahoma Policy Institute.

== Oklahoma House of Representatives ==
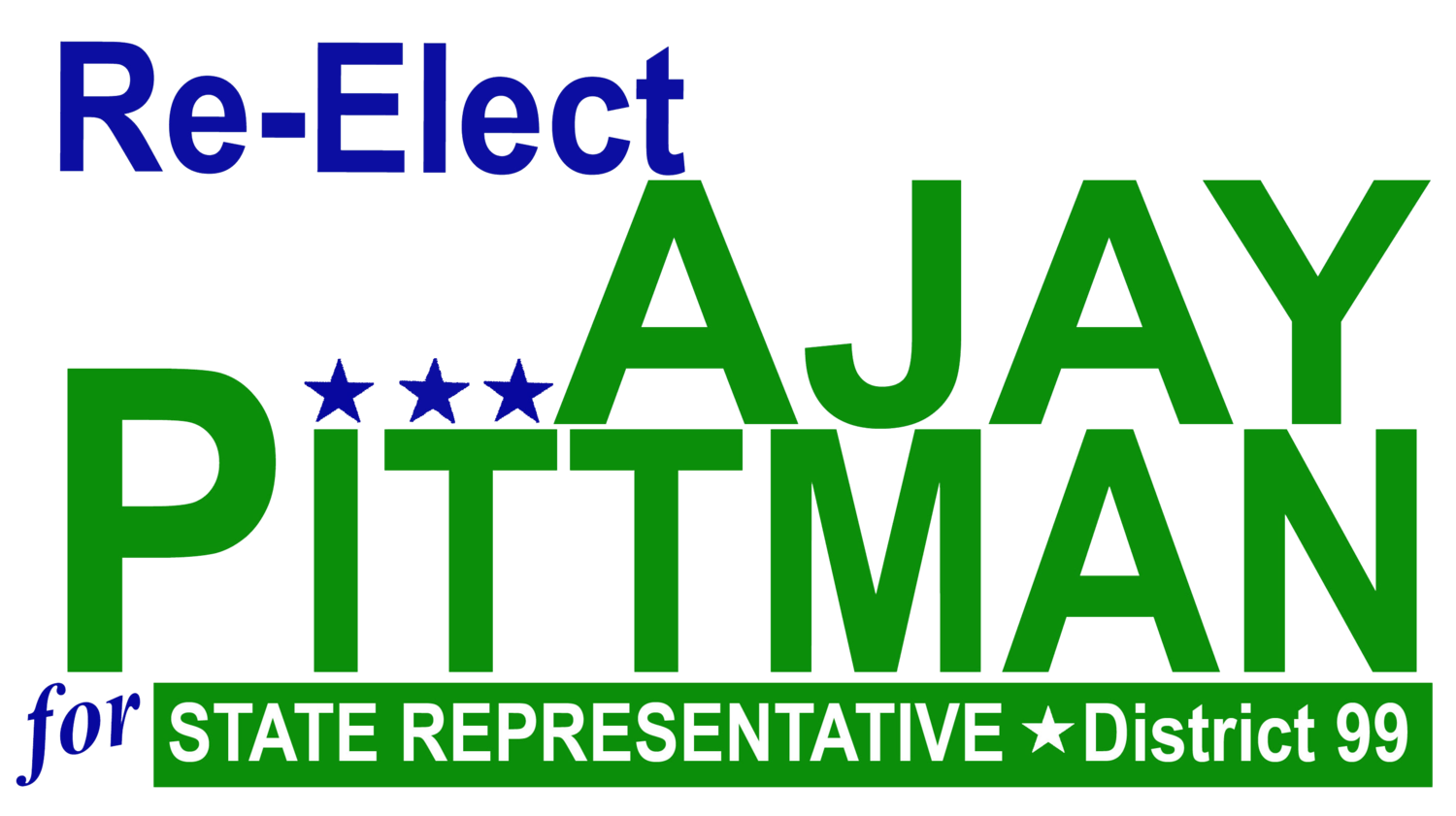
Ajay Pittman's campaign logo

Pittman filed to run for the 99th district of the Oklahoma House of Representatives in 2018, alongside fellow Democratic candidates Nkem House, Crentha Sequoya Turner, Chris Harrison, and Steve Davis. House filed contests of candidacy against Pittman and Harrison, with the Oklahoma State Election Board keeping Pittman on the ballot and removing Harrison. Pittman later advanced to a runoff alongside House, which she won. She succeeded Representative George E. Young, who had run for a seat in the Oklahoma Senate.

=== 2020 campaign and second term ===
In 2020, Pittman ran for reelection and in the Democratic primary she was challenged by Susan Porter, the daughter of E. Melvin Porter who was the first black member of the Oklahoma Senate. Pittman defeated Porter in the Democratic primary.

In 2020, Pittman was appointed to the Joint Legislative Committee on State and Tribal Relations by Speaker of the House Charles McCall.

During the 2020 presidential election Pittman endorsed Joe Biden for the Democratic presidential nomination. In 2020, Pittman was endorsed by EMILY's List.

In 2021, legislation which would prohibit governmental entities from mandating vaccination and from inflicting penalties against any person who refuses to vaccinate, including children, was passed through the public health committee by a vote of seven to one, with Pittman being the only vote against. The legislation later passed in the state house by a vote of seventy-one to twenty-five.

=== 2024 campaign and campaign finance violations ===
In 2024, Pittman ran for reelection and faced a primary challenge from Brittane Grant. In late May the Oklahoma Ethics Commission released a settlement agreement between Pittman and the commission that fined her $17,141 and ordered her to repay $17,858.22 to her campaign for improperly drawing funds from her campaign and inaccurate reporting of contributions. Pittman said the agreement was "regarding a clerical error." In June, she filed a lawsuit seeking to remove Grant from the ballot for a 2016 guilty plea for a deferred sentence. Pittman won the primary election.

On October 16, 2025, the Oklahoma Ethics Commission filed a civil suit against Pittman alleging fraud on the same day Oklahoma Attorney General Gentner Drummond's office executed a search warrant on her legislative office and her mother Anastasia Pittman's home. The commission's suit alleged Pittman submitted a letter during their investigation she claimed was from her building manager, but was actually written by her mother. The suit also alleged that Pittman submitted a fake $2,500 cashier's check to make a donation from the Osage Nation appear as if she was paying part of her campaign finance fine. Speaker of the Oklahoma House Kyle Hilbert removed her from the state's tribal relations committee due to the allegations. A week later she was suspended from the rest of her committee assignments and the House Democratic Caucus.

On October 28, 2025, a returned search warrant confirmed Oklahoma Attorney General Drummond's office had launched a criminal investigation into Pittman for embezzlement, fraud, and violations of the Oklahoma Computer Crimes Act. On January 28, 2026, she resigned her legislative office, entered a settlement agreement with the Oklahoma Ethics Commission, and plead guilty to conspiring to commit a felony, forgery in the second degree, and violating the Oklahoma Computer Crimes Act. She received a seven year deferred sentence.

== Electoral history ==
2018 Oklahoma House of Representatives 99th district Democratic primary
Party	Candidate	Votes	%
Democratic	Ajay Pittman	2,194	38.13%
Democratic	Nkem House	1,848	32.12%
Democratic	Steve Davis	1,005	17.47%
Democratic	Crentha Sequoya Turner	707	12.29%
Total votes		5,754	100.00%

2018 Oklahoma House of Representatives 99th district Democratic runoff primary
Party	Candidate	Votes	%
Democratic	Ajay Pittman	1,481	51.91%
Democratic	Nkem House	1,372	48.09%
Total votes		2,853	100.00%

2020 Oklahoma House of Representatives 99th district Democratic primary
Party	Candidate	Votes	%
Democratic	Ajay Pittman (incumbent)	2,837	51.95%
Democratic	Susan Porter	2,624	48.05%
Total votes		5,461	100.00%

2024 Oklahoma House of Representatives 99th district Democratic primary
Party	Candidate	Votes	%
Democratic	Ajay Pittman (incumbent)	1,322	53.54%
Democratic	Brittane Grant	1,147	46.46%
Total votes		2,469	100.00%

== See also ==
- List of Native American politicians
- Native American women in politics
