= Nikki Nice =

American politician

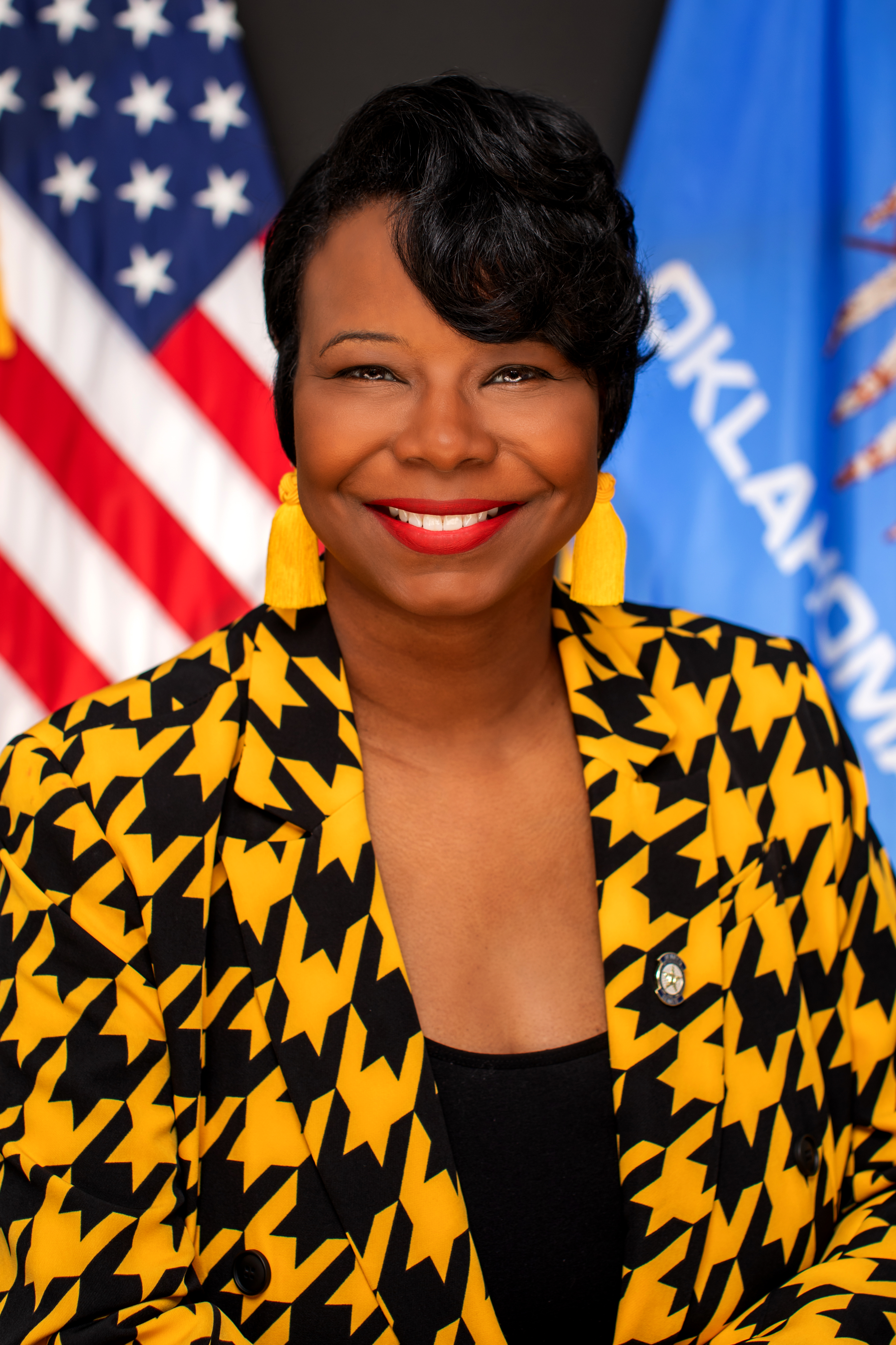
- Official portrait, 2024

Member of the Oklahoma Senate from the 48th district
- Incumbent
- Assumed office November 13, 2024
- Preceded by: George Young

Oklahoma City Councilor for Ward 7
- In office November 19, 2018 – November 13, 2024
- Preceded by: John A. Pettis Jr.
- Succeeded by: Lee E. Cooper

Personal details
- Born: Alberta Nicole Swanegan Owens

Nikki Nice is an American politician who has served in the Oklahoma Senate representing the 48th district since November 2024. She previously served on the Oklahoma City Council from November 2018 until November 2024.

== Early life and career ==
Nikki Nice was born Alberta Nicole Swanegan Owens. She attended Millwood Public Schools and Northeast High School in Oklahoma City before graduating from Langston University.

Prior to serving in elected office Nice was a radio and television personality in Oklahoma. She was an on-air personality at Heart & Soul 92.1 and Power 103.5.

== Oklahoma City Council ==
Nice was elected to represent Ward 7 on the Oklahoma City Council in 2018 in a special election to succeed John A. Pettis Jr. who resigned after being criminally charged. She was sworn in on November 19, 2018. She was reelected without opposition in 2021.

== Oklahoma Senate ==
Nice filed to run for the Oklahoma Senate's 48th district in 2024 after incumbent George Young announced his retirement. She defeated Constance N. Johnson, the only other candidate to file, in June 18 Democratic primary. She assumed office on November 13, 2024.

== Electoral history ==
2024 Oklahoma Senate 48th district Democratic primary special election
Party	Candidate	Votes	%
Democratic	Nikki Nice	3,904	72.7%
Democratic	Connie Johnson	1,468	27.3%
Total votes		5,372	100%
