= Derrick Hildebrant =

American politician

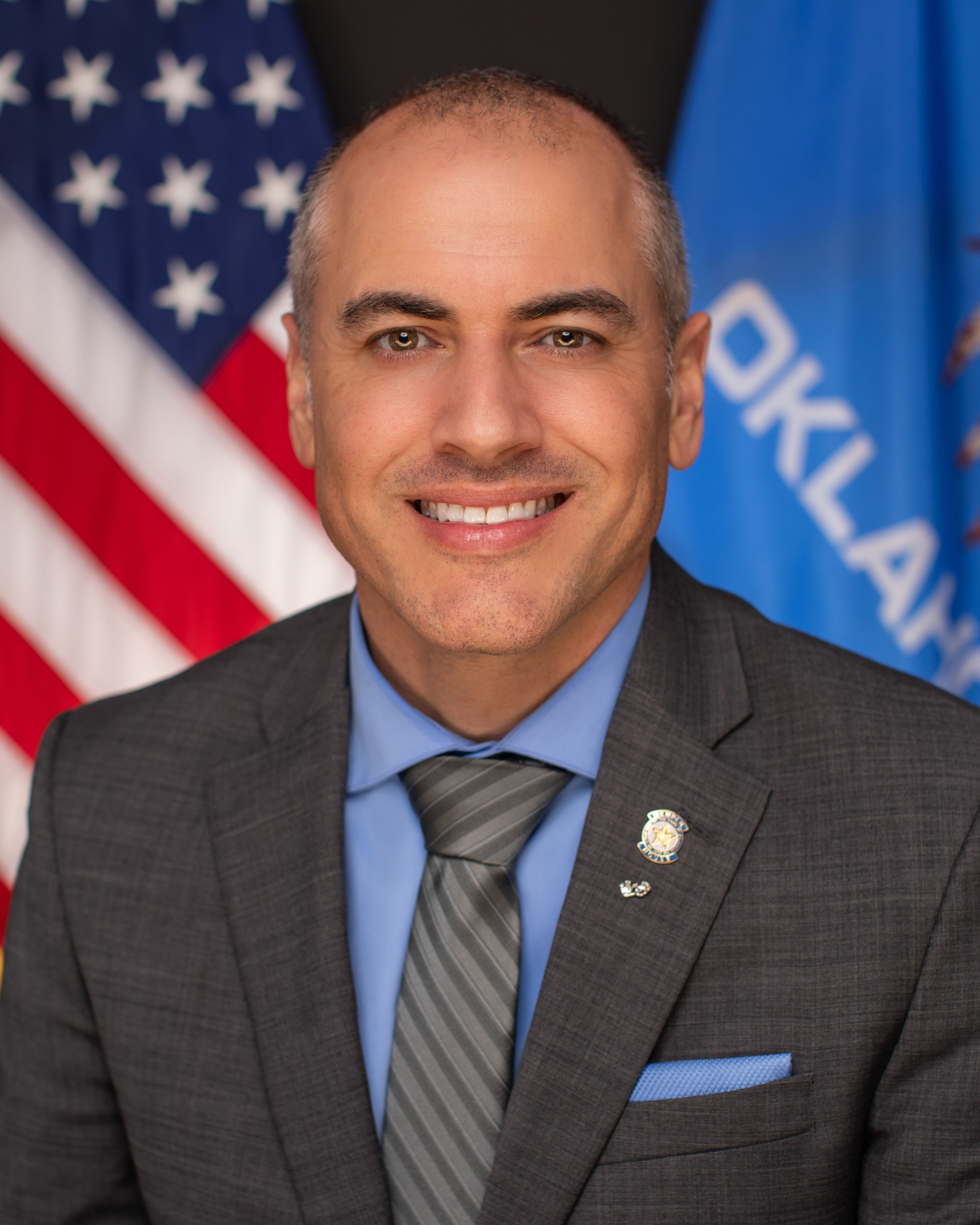
- Hildebrant in 2024

Member of the Oklahoma House of Representatives from the 23rd district
- Incumbent
- Assumed office November 20, 2024
- Preceded by: Terry O'Donnell

Catoosa City Councilor
- In office 2015–2018

Personal details
- Party: Republican

Derrick Robert Hildebrant is an American politician who has served in the Oklahoma House of Representatives representing the 23rd district since 2024. He previously served on the Catoosa City Council from 2015 to 2018.

== Early career ==
Hildebrant served in the Oklahoma National Guard for 25 years and on the Catoosa City Councilor between 2015 and 2018. He has a BS from Oklahoma State University and an MDiv, ThM, and a PhD in Christian preaching from the Southern Baptist Theological Seminary.

== Oklahoma House ==
Hildebrant filed to run for the Oklahoma House of Representatives 23rd district to succeed term limited incumbent Terry O'Donnell and faced Connor Whitham in the Republican primary. He won the election with 72% of the vote.
