= Government of Oklahoma City =

Municipal government in Oklahoma, United States

The Government of Oklahoma City operates under a council-manager form of city government and consists of the mayor, the Oklahoma City Council, the city manager, and various departments and services. City administrative staff and elected officials have offices at the historic city hall located on the western edge of the central business district in Downtown Oklahoma City.

== History ==
The Oklahoma City Charter was adopted in 1911. An amendment in 1927 established the council-manager form of government.

== Mayor and City Council ==
The Oklahoma City Council is non-partisan and its nine members are elected to four-year terms. Oklahoma City is divided into eight wards, and voters in each ward elect a council member to represent that ward. The mayor is the voting member who is elected by all voters of the city, and is the Chief Executive of the City and President of the Council. The city council enacts ordinances, adopts city budgets, and appoints a city manager to serve as the City's chief administrative official.

The salary of the members of the council is $12,000 and the salary of the Mayor is $24,000.

== City Manager ==
Under Oklahoma City's council-manager form of government, the city manager is the chief administrative office of the city. The city manager has the ultimate responsibility of Oklahoma City's administration and operations and is appointed by the city council. The city's budget is prepared by the city manager for the city council's consideration, which was $1.65 billion for FY 2022.

The current city manager is Craig Freeman and assumed office on January 2, 2019, after Jim Couch announced his retirement after serving as city manager for 18 years.

The salary of the city manager is $268,224.

== Federal representation ==
The Federal Transfer Center, Oklahoma City, a facility within the Federal Bureau of Prisons is located on the western edge of Will Rogers World Airport. Most of the city is represented by Stephanie Bice (R) of the 5th Congressional District, with a southern portion of the city represented by Tom Cole (R) of the 4th district in the United States House of Representatives.
