= Terry O'Donnell (politician) =

American politician

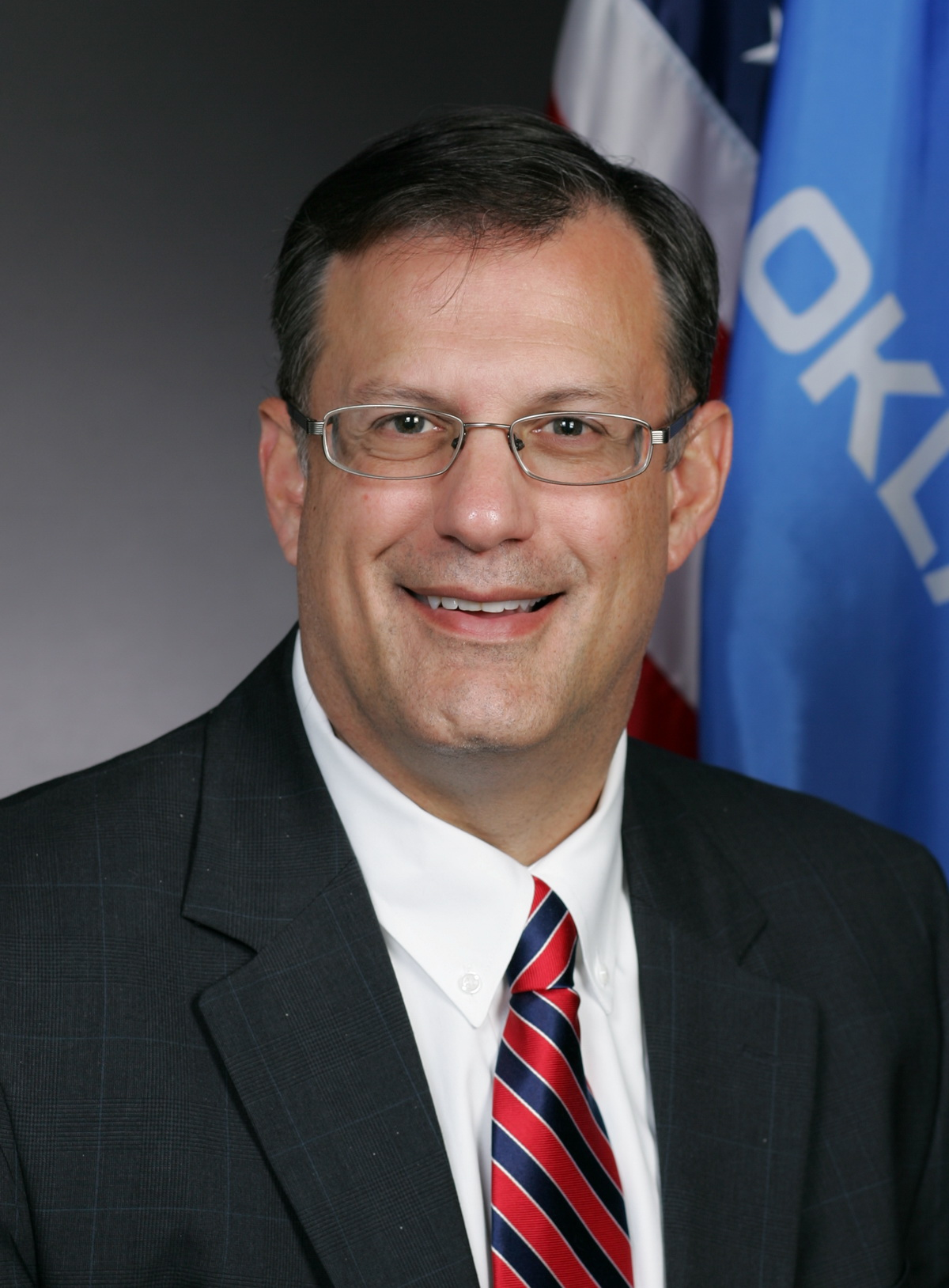

Speaker pro tempore of the Oklahoma House of Representatives
- In office January 5, 2021 – February 2, 2022
- Preceded by: Harold Wright
- Succeeded by: Kyle Hilbert

Member of the Oklahoma House of Representatives from the 23rd district
- In office January 8, 2013 – November 20, 2024
- Preceded by: Sue Tibbs
- Succeeded by: Derrick Hildebrant

Personal details
- Born: November 1, 1963 (age 63) Tulsa, Oklahoma, U.S.
- Party: Republican
- Education: Baylor University (BA); University of Tulsa (JD)

Terry O'Donnell (born November 1, 1963) is an American politician and a member of the Republican Party who served as the Oklahoma House Representative for the 23rd district from January 8, 2013, to November 20, 2024. He first won elected office in the 2012 Oklahoma state elections. In January 2021, O'Donnell was promoted to be the speaker pro tempore of the Oklahoma House of Representatives, the second highest ranking Republican Party of Oklahoma member in the state house.

On December 17, 2021, O'Donnell was indicted in relation to a tag agency corruption scandal. He resigned as speaker pro tempore on February 2, 2022 but later rejoined House Republican leadership in 2023 as majority whip, "a position that involves coordinating the teams of legislators that whip vote counts ahead of key bills."

== Legislative career ==
O'Donnell was first elected to the Oklahoma House of Representatives in the 2012 Oklahoma state elections to represent district 23. O'Donnell is from Catoosa, Oklahoma. He will be term limited from the Oklahoma State Legislature in 2024.

=== 2012 election ===
O'Donnell was first elected as the State House Representative for district 23 in the 2012 Oklahoma state elections.

=== 2016 election ===
The Tulsa World endorsed O'Donnell in his 2016 re-election bid.

=== 56th Oklahoma legislature ===
In 2018, during the second session of the 56th Oklahoma Legislature, O'Donnell supported multiple bills to loosen the regulation of tag agencies. He voted in favor of both HB 3278 and SB 1439. HB 3278 allowed a tag agent to submit a letter of resignation "contingent on the appointment" of a specific replacement. SB 1439 removed the requirement that the Oklahoma Tax Commission interview all applicants for tag agent positions.

=== 57th Oklahoma legislature ===
In 2019, during the first session of the 57th Oklahoma Legislature, O'Donnell introduced HB 2098 which allowed the spouses of legislators to serve as tag agents. During floor debate only one member, Democratic Representative Shane Stone, questioned the bill asking "I feel like voting for this could be a little self-serving, wouldn’t you agree?” O'Donnell responded that "I think it restores your right as a citizen." Stone and two Republican Representatives, Tom Gann and Tommy Hardin, were the only no votes in the Oklahoma House. Eight Republican Senators voted no. In April 2019, Governor Kevin Stitt signed the bill into law.

=== 2020 election ===
In August 2019, the Oklahoma Tax Commission appointed O'Donnell's wife, Teresa O'Donnell, to succeed her mother as the head of the Catoosa Tag Agency. During the election, Oklahoma City Democratic State Representative Collin Walke criticized O'Donnell tag agency reforms saying "The timing of Rep. O’Donnell’s legislation in connection with the timing of the transfer of his mother-in-law’s tag agency to his wife smacks of self-dealing; and at best, created an appearance of impropriety that should have kept Rep. O’Donnell from running the bill in the first place." O'Donnell responded by saying he did not know his wife would be acquiring her mother's tag agency until after the latter's death in July 2019.

=== 58th Oklahoma legislature ===
O'Donnell served as the second highest-ranking Republican in the Oklahoma House of Representatives for the first session of the 58th Oklahoma Legislature. He resigned from leadership before the second session of the 58th Oklahoma legislature after being indicted.

=== 59th Oklahoma Legislature ===
In 2023, Democratic lawmakers called "for Republican lawmakers to be held accountable" after O'Donnell, Ryan Martinez, and Dean Davis all had trouble with the law This came after the March 2023 censure of Representative Maureen Turner for sheltering someone wanted by the police in their office.

In June 2023, he endorsed Ron DeSantis for the 2024 presidential election.

=== 60th Oklahoma Legislature ===
In 2024, he voted in favor of a bill that would require adults to present identification before accessing porn sites.

== Grand Jury Investigation ==
In December 2021, Terry O'Donnell was indicted on charges related to a 2019 tag agency bill he authored. The indictment alleged that O'Donnell violated his oath of office by knowingly removing statutory requirements that could have prohibited his wife from functionally inheriting a tag agent position from her mother. O'Donnell described the indictment as a being driven by the "woke left" and "Oklahoma City operatives". O’Donnell stepped down from his house leadership position in January 2022 and filed for reelection in April.

In February 2023, Attorney General Gentner Drummond's (R) office took control of the corruption case against O'Donnell from the newly elected Oklahoma County district attorney Vicki Behenna's office. In April, Drummond's office dismissed the charges against O'Donnell saying he was "guilty," but politically targeted for prosecution.

Oklahoma House of Representatives
Preceded by Harold Wright	Speaker pro tempore of the Oklahoma House of Representatives; 2021–2022	Succeeded by Kyle Hilbert
