= 2012 Oklahoma elections =

The Oklahoma state elections was held on Election Day, November 6, 2012 for a number of offices. The presidential preferential primary election was held on March 6, 2012, and the primary election was held on June 26, 2012.

== President ==
Oklahoma presidential election, 2012
Party	Candidate	Votes	%
Republican	Mitt Romney	891,325	66.77%
Democratic	Barack Obama	443,547	33.23%
Total votes		1,334,872	

== U.S. representatives ==
All five Oklahoma seats in the United States House of Representatives are up for election in 2012.

Candidate	Votes	%
District 1
Jim Bridenstine	181,084	63.47%
John Olson	91,421	32.04%
Craig Allen	12,807	4.49%
District 2
Markwayne Mullin	143,701	57.34%
Rob Wallace	96,081	38.34%
Michael G. Fulks	10,830	4.32%
District 3
Frank D. Lucas	201,744	75.28%
Timothy Ray Murray	53,472	19.95%
William M. Sanders	12,787	4.77%
District 4
Tom Cole	176,740	67.89%
Donna Marie Bebo	71,846	27.60%
RJ Harris	11,745	4.51%
District 5
James Lankford	153,603	58.70%
Tom Guild	97,504	37.26%
Pat Martin	5,394	2.06%
Robert T. Murphy	5,176	1.98%

== Corporation commissioner ==
One seat on the Oklahoma Corporation Commission is up for election in 2012.

== State legislature ==
=== Senate ===
24 of the 48 seats in the Oklahoma Senate are up for election in 2012.

Candidate	Votes	%
District 3
Wayne Shaw	13,413	54.27%
Jim Bynum	11,302	45.73%
District 5
Jerry Ellis	15,920	66.53%
Howard Houchen	8,010	33.47%
District 7
Larry Boggs	14,210	53.85%
J.Paul Lane	12,178	46.15%
District 9
Earl Garrison	17,191	69.69%
Barney S Taylor	7,476	30.31%
District 11
Jabar Shumate	15,123	75.95%
Dave Bell	3,412	17.04%
Curtis J. Mullins	1,404	7.01%
District 13
Susan Paddack	19,842	75.85%
Fred E Smith	6,319	24.15%

Candidate	Votes	%
District 15
Rob Standridge	18,789	61.54%
Claudia Griffith	11,741	38.46%
District 27
A. Bryce Marlatt	23,226	84.46%
Tommy W. Nicholson	4,273	15.54%
District 31
Don Barrington	15,805	67.69%
Tony Terrill	7,508	32.21%
District 39
Brian A. Crain	19,018	56.91%
Julie Hall	14,398	43.09%
District 41
Clark Jolley	27,417	79.40%
Richard Prawdzienski	7,112	20.60%
District 43
Corey Brooks	27,014	70.68%
Mike Fullerton	8,717	29.32%

=== House of Representatives ===
All 101 seats in the Oklahoma House of Representatives are up for election in 2012.

Candidate	Votes	%
District 2
John R. Bennet		
Rick Agent		
District 3
James H Lockhart		
Roger Mattox		
District 12
Wade Rousselot		
David Tackett		
District 14
Arthur Hulbert		
Jerry Rains		
District 16
Jerry Shoemake		
James Delso		
District 20
Bobby Cleveland		
Matt Branstetter		
District 21
Dustin Roberts		
Jerry L. Tomlinson		
District 22
Charles A McCall		
Doris Annie Row		
District 23
Terry O'Donnell		
Shawna Keller		
District 26
Justin Freeland Wood		
Patty Sue Wagstaff		
District 27
Josh Cockroft		
Randy R Gilbert		
District 28
Tom Newell		
Marilyn Rainwater		
District 29
Skye McNiel		
David W Narcomey		
District 32
Jason Smalley		
Keith Kinnamon		
District 36
Sean Roberts		
Jim Massey		
District 37
Steven E. Vaughan		
Nancy L. Niemann		
District 42
Lisa J. Billy		
Steven Vines		

Candidate	Votes	%
District 45
Aaron Stiles		
Paula Roberts		
District 47
Leslie Kathryn Osborn		
Leon A Pivinski		
District 48
Patrick Ownbey		
Brian Spencer		
District 51
Scott R. Biggs		
Stewart Meyer		
District 56
David L Perryman		
Chuck Utsler		
District 60
Dan Fisher		
Kendra Menz-Kimble		
District 66
Jadine Nollan		
David C. Phillips, III		
District 71
Katie Henke		
Dan Arthrell		
District 72
Seneca Scott		
Randall L. Reese		
District 76
David Brumbaugh		
Glenda K. Puett		
District 78
Jeannie McDaniel		
Paul Catalano		
District 83
Randy McDaniel		
Ed Holzberger		
District 86
Will Fourkiller		
Russell Don Turner		
District 87
Jason Nelson		
Nick Singer		
District 88
Kay Floyd		
Aaron Kaspereit		
District 99
Anastasia Pittman		
Willard Linzy		
District 101
Gary Banz		
Stephen E. Covert		

== Judicial ==
These races are "retention" votes based on Oklahoma's use of the Missouri Plan for electing judicial nominees.

=== Oklahoma Supreme Court ===
Noma D. Gurich
Choice
For
Against
Total

Yvonne Kauger
Choice
For
Against
Total

James E. Edmondson
Choice
For
Against
Total

Douglas L. Combs
Choice
For
Against
Total

=== Oklahoma Court of Criminal Appeals ===
Clancy Smith
Choice
For
Against
Total

Arlene Johnson
Choice
For
Against
Total

David B. Lewis
Choice
For
Against
Total

=== Oklahoma Court of Civil Appeals ===
P. Thomas Thornbrugh
Choice
For
Against
Total

William C. Hetherington, Jr
Choice
For
Against
Total

Kenneth L. Buettner
Choice
For
Against
Total

Robert Bobby Bell
Choice
For
Against
Total

E. Bay Mitchell, III
Choice
For
Against
Total
