= George E. Young =

American politician

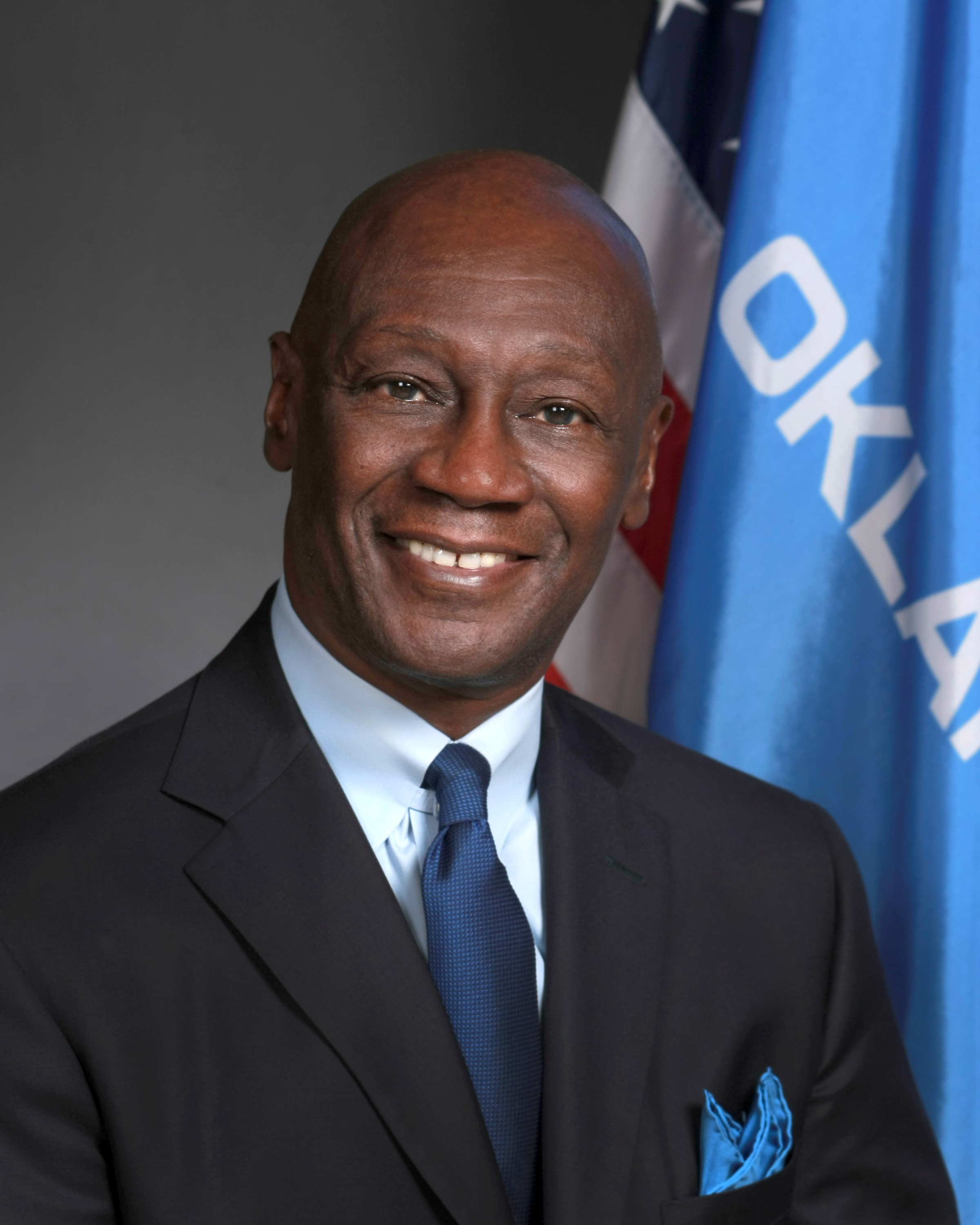
- Official portrait, 2018

Member of the Oklahoma Senate from the 48th district
- In office November 2018 – November 13, 2024
- Preceded by: Anastasia Pittman
- Succeeded by: Nikki Nice

Member of the Oklahoma House of Representatives from the 99th district
- In office November 2014 – November 2018
- Preceded by: Anastasia Pittman
- Succeeded by: Ajay Pittman

Personal details
- Born: Memphis, Tennessee, U.S.
- Party: Democratic
- Education: Oklahoma Christian University (MA; MBA); Phillips Theological Seminary (MDIV)

George E. Young Sr. is an American pastor and politician who served in the Oklahoma Senate from the 48th district as a member of the Democratic Party from 2019 to 2024. Prior to his tenure in the state senate he served in the Oklahoma House of Representatives representing the 99th district from 2015 to 2019.

== Early life and education ==
George E. Young Sr. was born in Memphis, Tennessee. He graduated from Lambuth University, Oklahoma Christian University with a master of business administration and Master of Arts degrees, and Phillips Theological Seminary with a master of divinity degree. He received a Doctorate of Ministry in 2010 from Phillips Theological Seminary. He worked as the senior pastor at Holy Temple Baptist Church.

Young served as a member of the Oklahoma Commission for Human Services and he criticized Governor Mary Fallin for not appointing a black or Hispanic person to succeed him on the commission. He served as a delegate to the 2008 and 2012 Democratic National Conventions.

== Career ==
=== Oklahoma House of Representatives ===
Representative Anastasia Pittman did not seek reelection to the Oklahoma House of Representatives from the 99th district in the 2014 election. He defeated Eleanor Darden Thompson and Steve Davis in the initial Democratic primary, won in the runoff against Thompson, and defeated Republican nominee Willard Linzy in the general election. He won reelection in the 2014 election against independent candidate Marina Mangiaracina. Ajay Pittman was elected to succeed him in the 2018 election.

Young was selected to serve as vice-chair of the Democratic caucus in the state house in 2017, and also served as chair of the Black Caucus of the state legislature.

=== Oklahoma Senate ===
Young ran for a seat in the Oklahoma Senate from the 48th district in the 2018 election. He defeated Christine Byrd in the Democratic primary and Republican nominee Linzy in the general election. Young introduced unsuccessful legislation in 2020 that would have increased Oklahoma's minimum wage from $7.25 per hour to $10.50 per hour.

He faced a primary challenge in 2022 from Rico Smith and won reelection. In February 2024 he announced he was resigning in November, triggering a special election for his successor.

==== Opposition to state prison rodeo ====
Young was against the reinstatement of the Oklahoma State Penitentiary Rodeo. In 2024, Jim Grego co-authored House bill 3749 and Senate bill 1427, along with Senator Warren Hamilton to carve out 8.3 million dollars to bring back the Oklahoma State Penitentiary Rodeo, despite others, such as a representative of the Arnall Family Foundation, calling out the move as exploitative and dangerous toward the inmates and animals and a waste of funds that could be spent on reforms. The Oklahoma Department of Corrections claims "the total cost of the renovations is $9.3 million, and after contributing $1 million, they're asking the legislature to help fund the remaining $8.3 million, but some lawmakers argue that money should be spent on other issues," such as Representative Andy Fugate. As of 2024, Louisiana "is the only state that has a behind-the-walls prison rodeo." ODOC Executive Director Steve Harpe claims that it would bring in revenue for the department and support functions like a call center, and that Netflix, ESPN, and PBR are eyeing Oklahoma because of it. In 2023, George Young said that taxpayer dollars being used to revive the rodeo could be better spent on education programs for inmates or initiatives to improve prison health care.

== Electoral history ==
George E. Young electoral history

2014 Oklahoma House of Representatives 99th district Democratic primary
Party	Candidate	Votes	%
Democratic	George E. Young	1,074	43.10%
Democratic	Eleanor Darden Thompson	779	31.26%
Democratic	Steve Davis	639	25.64%
Total votes		2,492	100.00%

2014 Oklahoma House of Representatives 99th district Democratic primary runoff
Party	Candidate	Votes	%
Democratic	George E. Young	1,129	59.33%
Democratic	Eleanor Darden Thompson	774	40.67%
Total votes		1,903	100.00%

2014 Oklahoma House of Representatives 99th district election
Party	Candidate	Votes	%
Democratic	George E. Young	5,720	82.29%
Republican	Willard Linzy	1,231	17.71%
Total votes		6,951	100.00%

2016 Oklahoma House of Representatives 99th district election
Party	Candidate	Votes	%
Democratic	George E. Young (incumbent)	9,421	81.77%
Independent	Marina Mangiaracina	2,100	18.23%
Total votes		11,521	100.00%

2018 Oklahoma Senate 48th district election
Primary election
Party	Candidate	Votes	%
Democratic	George E. Young	6,984	52.69%
Democratic	Christine Byrd	6,271	47.31%
Total votes		13,255	100.00%
General election
Democratic	George E. Young	19,385	81.90%
Republican	Willard Linzy	4,285	18.10%
Total votes		23,670	100.00%

2022 Oklahoma Senate 48th district election
Party	Candidate	Votes	%
Democratic	George E. Young	5,887	73.88%
Democratic	Rico Trayvon Smith	2,081	26.12%
Total votes		7,968	100.00%
