= 2014 United States Senate election in Oklahoma =

- November 4, 2014
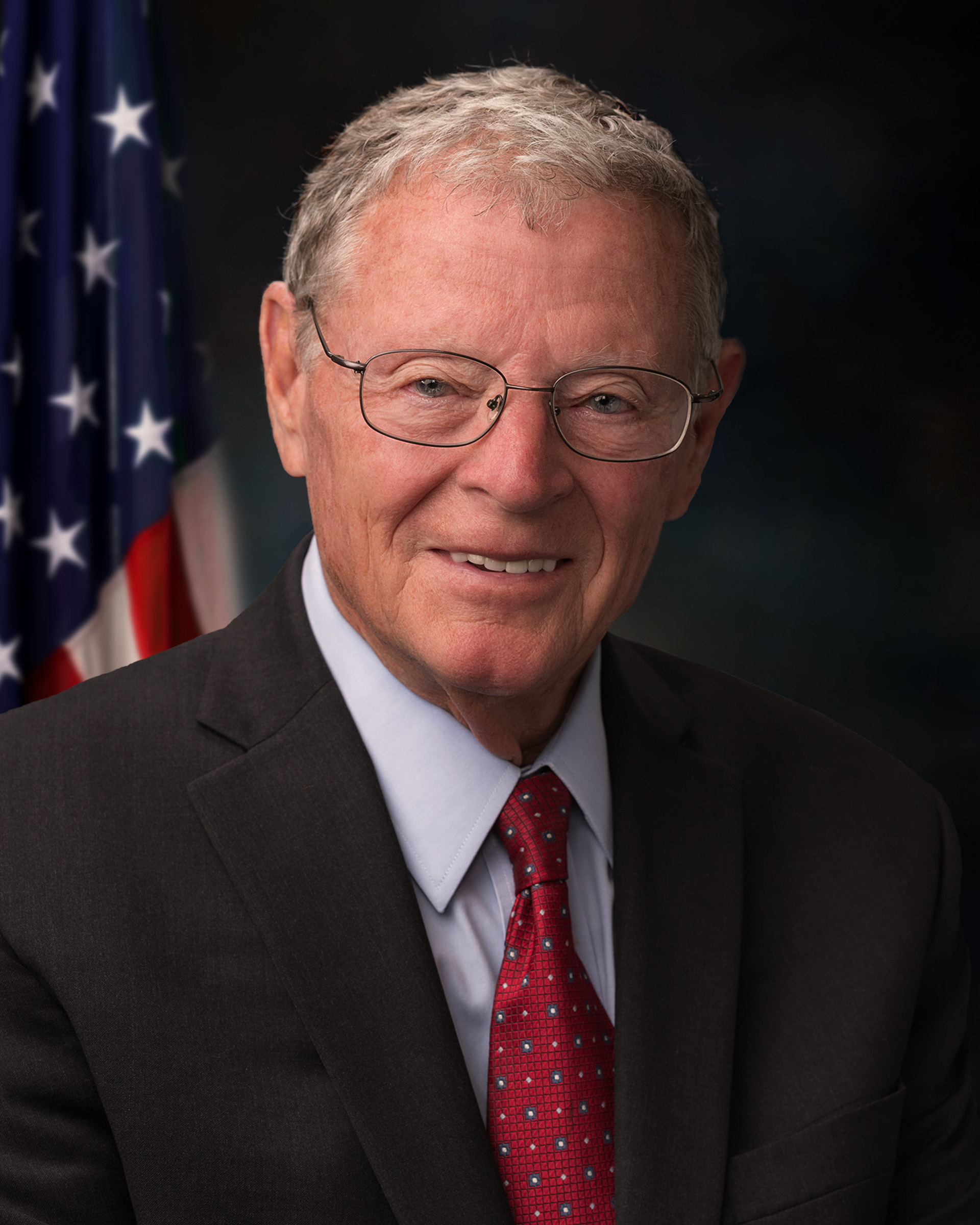

| Nominee | Jim Inhofe | Matt Silverstein |
| Party | Republican | Democratic |
| Popular vote | 558,166 | 234,307 |
| Percentage | 68.01% | 28.55% |
- County results Inhofe: 50–60% 60–70% 70–80% 80–90% >90%
U.S. senator before election
Jim Inhofe
Republican
Elected U.S. Senator
Jim Inhofe
Republican

The 2014 United States Senate election in Oklahoma took place on November 4, 2014, to elect a member of the United States Senate to represent the State of Oklahoma. It was held concurrently with the special election to Oklahoma's other Senate seat, other elections to the United States Senate in other states, elections to the United States House of Representatives, and various state and local elections.

Incumbent Republican Senator Jim Inhofe was running for re-election to a fourth full term in office. He won the Republican primary against several minor candidates; Democratic nominee Matt Silverstein, an insurance agency owner, was unopposed for his party's nomination. This was Inhofe's first election in which he won every county, and his only election in which he won a majority in every county.

== Republican primary ==
=== Candidates ===
==== Declared ====
- Jim Inhofe, incumbent U.S. senator
- D. Jean McBride-Samuels
- Rob Moye, retired air traffic controller
- Evelyn Rogers, perennial candidate
- Erick Wyatt, Iraq War veteran

=== Endorsements ===
Jim Inhofe
- FreedomWorks
- The National Federation of Independent Business

=== Results ===
Republican primary results
| Party | Candidate | Votes | % |
|---|---|---|---|
| Republican | Jim Inhofe (incumbent) | 231,291 | 87.69% |
| Republican | Evelyn Rogers | 11,960 | 4.53% |
| Republican | Erick Wyatt | 11,713 | 4.44% |
| Republican | Rob Moye | 4,846 | 1.84% |
| Republican | D. Jean McBride-Samuels | 3,965 | 1.50% |
| Total votes | | 263,775 | 100.00% |

== Democratic primary ==
=== Candidates ===
==== Declared ====
- Matt Silverstein, insurance agency owner

=== Endorsements ===
Matt Silverstein

Organizations

- AFL-CIO
- International Brotherhood of Boilermakers, Iron Ship Builders, Blacksmiths, Forgers and Helpers
- Sierra Club
- United Automobile Workers

Individuals

- Drew Edmondson
- Brad Henry

Silverstein was unopposed for the Democratic nomination, so no primary was held.

== Independents ==
=== Candidates ===
==== Declared ====
- Aaron DeLozier
- Joan Farr
- Ray Woods

== General election ==
=== Predictions ===
| Source | Ranking | As of |
|---|---|---|
| The Cook Political Report | Solid R | November 3, 2014 |
| Sabato's Crystal Ball | Safe R | November 3, 2014 |
| Rothenberg Political Report | Safe R | November 3, 2014 |
| Real Clear Politics | Safe R | November 3, 2014 |

=== Polling ===
| Poll source | Date(s) administered | Sample size | Margin of error | Jim Inhofe (R) | Matt Silverstein (D) | Other | Undecided |
|---|---|---|---|---|---|---|---|
| Rasmussen Reports | July 15–16, 2014 | 750 | ± 4% | 58% | 27% | 4% | 10% |
| CBS News/NYT/YouGov | July 5–24, 2014 | 1,312 | ± 4.7% | 56% | 32% | 10% | 3% |
| Sooner Poll | August 28–30, 2014 | 603 | ± 3.99% | 59% | 27% | 5% | 9% |
| CBS News/NYT/YouGov | August 18 – September 2, 2014 | 821 | ± 5% | 60% | 28% | 1% | 11% |
| Sooner Poll | September 27–29, 2014 | 400 | ± 4.9% | 56% | 32% | 5% | 7% |
| CBS News/NYT/YouGov | September 20 – October 1, 2014 | 1,244 | ± 3% | 67% | 25% | 0% | 8% |
| CBS News/NYT/YouGov | October 16–23, 2014 | 995 | ± 5% | 63% | 27% | 0% | 10% |
| Sooner Poll | October 25–29, 2014 | 949 | ± 3.18% | 63% | 28% | 5% | 4% |

=== Results ===
United States Senate election in Oklahoma, 2014
| Party | Candidate | Votes | % | ±% |
|---|---|---|---|---|
| Republican | Jim Inhofe (incumbent) | 558,166 | 68.01% | +11.33% |
| Democratic | Matt Silverstein | 234,307 | 28.55% | −10.63% |
| Independent | Joan Farr | 10,554 | 1.28% | N/A |
| Independent | Ray Woods | 9,913 | 1.21% | N/A |
| Independent | Aaron DeLozier | 7,793 | 0.95% | N/A |
| Total votes | | 820,733 | 100.00% | N/A |
| Republican hold | | | | |

==== Counties that flipped from Democratic to Republican ====
- Cherokee (largest city: Tahlequah)
- McIntosh (largest city: Checotah)
- Muskogee (largest city: Muskogee)
- Okmulgee (largest city: Okmulgee)

== See also ==
- 2014 United States Senate elections
- 2014 United States elections
- 2014 United States Senate special election in Oklahoma
- 2014 United States House of Representatives elections in Oklahoma
- 2014 Oklahoma gubernatorial election
