= Pam Peterson =

American politician (born 1955)

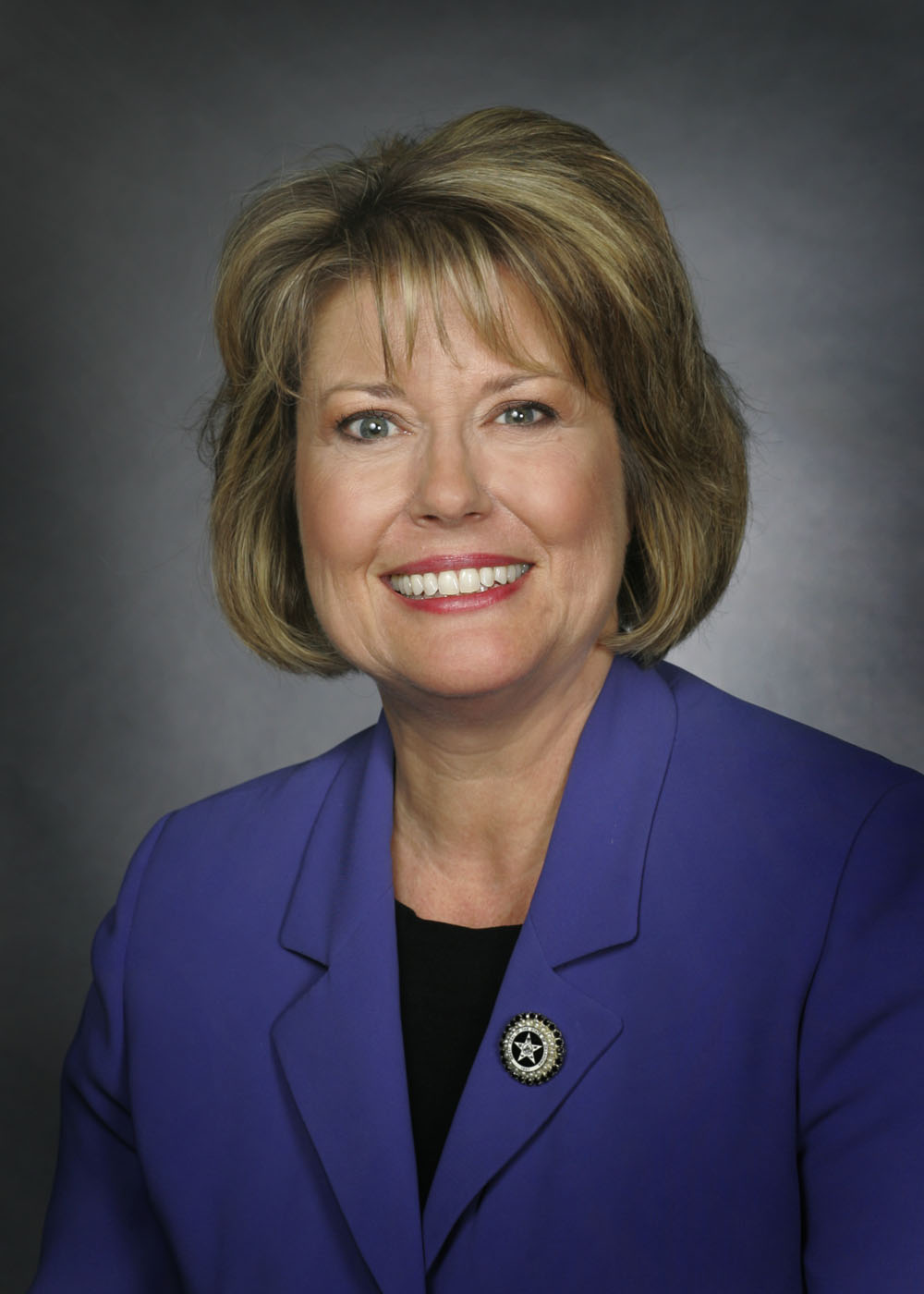

Member of the Oklahoma House of Representatives from the 67th district
- In office 2004 – November 17, 2016
- Preceded by: Hopper Smith
- Succeeded by: Scott McEachin

Personal details
- Born: June 28, 1955 (age 71) New York City, New York, United States
- Party: Republican
- Spouse: Paul D. Peterson
- Education: Oral Roberts University
- Occupation: Politician
- Profession: Television producer

Pamela Peterson (born June 28, 1955) is an American Republican Party politician from the U.S. state of New York, who represented the 67th district in the Oklahoma House of Representatives from 2004 to 2016. The district is contained in Tulsa County. She served as majority floor leader, the first woman to hold that post.

== Biography ==
Peterson was born in New York City and lived there until she was eighteen years old. Her parents were very involved with politics and Peterson began working on campaigns at the age of twelve. After high school, Peterson moved to Tulsa, OK to attend Oral Roberts University. Shortly after graduation, Peterson married and moved to Minneapolis with her husband. While her husband attended medical school at the University of Minnesota, Peterson worked for a TV station in the Twin Cities area.

Peterson and her family eventually moved back to Tulsa, where she volunteered on Don Nickles' campaign in 1992. When Representative Hopper Smith vacated his seat to serve in Afghanistan in 2003, Peterson ran, winning 68% of the vote against two male opponents.

== House of Representatives ==
Peterson was elected in 2005 and still serves in the Oklahoma House of Representatives. She will reach her term limit in 2016.

=== Committees ===
- Conference Committee on Criminal Justice & Corrections, Chair
- Criminal Justice & Corrections, Chair
- Children, Youth & Family Services, Vice Chair
- Conference Committee on Children, Youth & Family Services, Vice Chair
- Appropriations & Budget
- Conference Committee on Public Safety
- General Conference Committee on Appropriations & Budget
- Joint Committee on Appropriations & Budget
- Public Safety

=== Positions ===
- 1992 National Delegate to Republican Convention
- Former Tulsa County Republican Chairman
- Former 1st Congressional District Vice Chairman for Republican Party
- Former Majority Whip (’05-‘06)
- Task Force to Stop Sexual Violence Chairman
- Oklahoma Commission on Status of Women
