= Justin Wood (politician) =

American politician (born 1989)

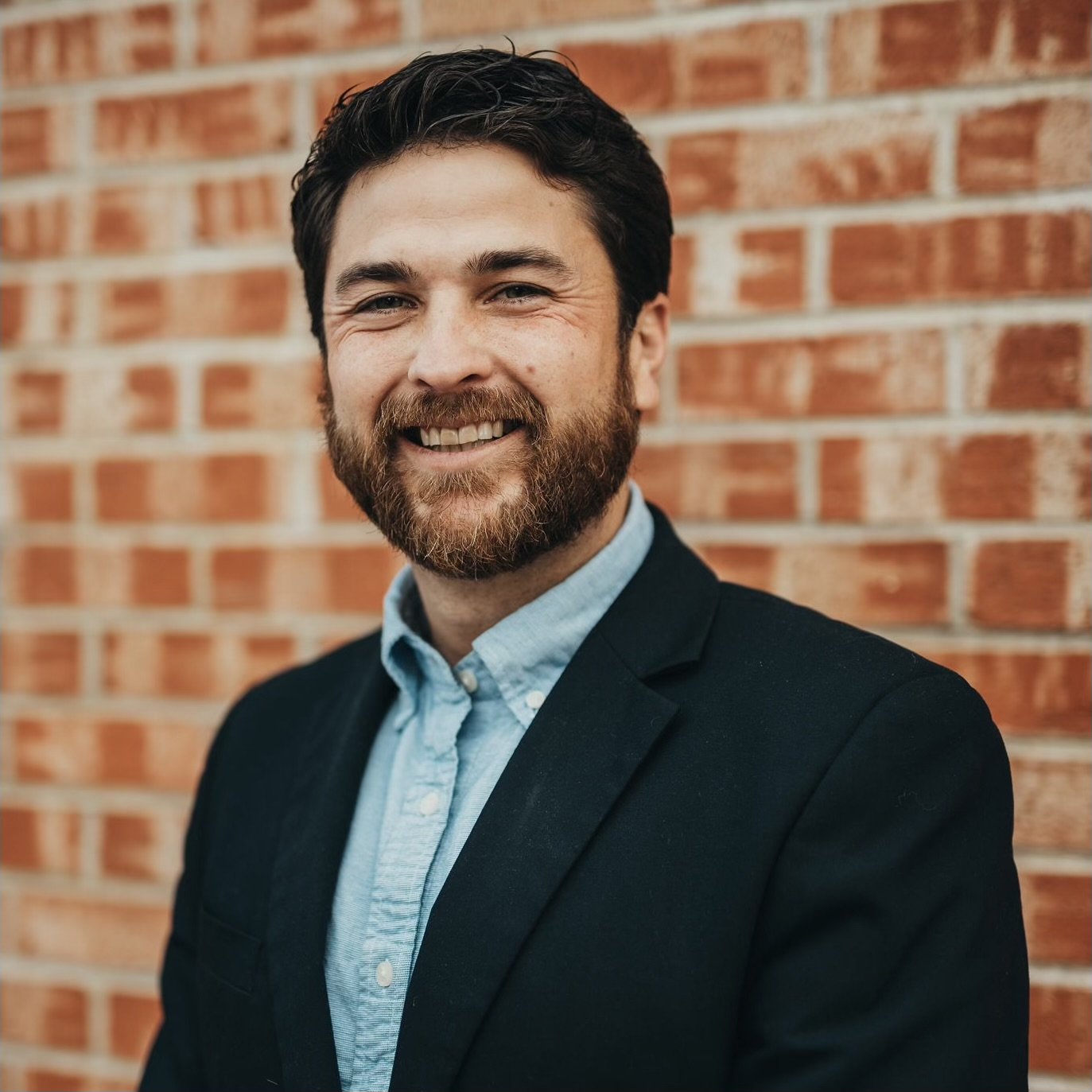
- Wood in 2024

Principal Chief of Sac and Fox Nation
- In office June 27, 2019 – 2022
- Deputy: Don Abney
- Preceded by: Kay Rhoads
- Succeeded by: Don Abney

Member of the Oklahoma House of Representatives from the 26th district
- In office November 2012 – November 2016
- Preceded by: Kris Steele
- Succeeded by: Dell Kerbs

Personal details
- Born: December 23, 1989 (age 36) Shawnee, Oklahoma
- Citizenship: American; Sac and Fox
- Party: Republican
- Education: University of Central Oklahoma

Justin Freeland Wood (born December 23, 1989) is an American politician who most recently served as the Principal Chief of the Sac and Fox Nation in Oklahoma. A member of the Republican Party, Wood previously represented the 26th District in the Oklahoma House of Representatives from 2012 to 2016, when he did not seek reelection.

== Early life and family ==
Wood was born on December 23, 1989, in Shawnee, Oklahoma, to Freeland and Shirley Wood. He graduated from Shawnee High School in 2008.

Wood and his wife have four children who are homeschooled. He lives in Shawnee and attends Heritage Church.

== Oklahoma House of Representatives ==
Wood was elected to the Oklahoma House of Representatives in 2012. During his time in office he served as the Vice Chairman of the Higher Education and Career Technology Committee from 2012 to 2016, and as Assistant Majority Whip from 2014 to 2016.

== Lobbying ==
Woods did not seek reelection in 2016. After leaving office he served as the Big Brothers Big Sisters of Oklahoma Area Director for Tulsa. During the 2016 Republican Presidential Primary Wood was a member of Ted Cruz’s Oklahoma leadership team.

In 2017 Wood left Big Brothers Big Sisters to serve as the State Director of Governmental Relations for the American Cancer Society.

== Sac and Fox Nation ==
On June 1, 2019, Wood won the primary election for Principal Chief of the Sac and Fox Nation outright. He was sworn in on June 27, 2019. He served until his resignation in 2022.

In 2019, he was elected as Chairman of the United Indian Nations of Oklahoma, Kansas, and Texas.

== 2026 State Senate Campaign ==
On June 26, 2025 Wood announced his candidacy for the Oklahoma Senate District 17 seat currently held by Shane Jett who will reach his term limit following the 2026 legislative session.

== Electoral history ==
=== 2012 Oklahoma House of Representatives ===
Republican primary election
Party	Candidate	Votes	%
Republican	Michael Shaw	808	43.19
Republican	Justin Freeland Wood	1,063	56.81
Total votes		1,871	100.0

2012 General election
Party	Candidate	Votes	%	±%
Republican	Justin Freeland Wood	7,457	60.58	
Democratic	Patty Sue Wagstaff	4,852	39.42	
Total votes		12,309	100.0	

=== 2014 Oklahoma House of Representatives ===
General election
Party	Candidate	Votes	%	±%
Republican	Justin Freeland Wood	5,595	72.30	+11.72
Democratic	Pamela Snider Stephens	2,144	27.7	−11.72
Total votes		7,739	100.0	
