= Harold Wright (politician) =

American politician

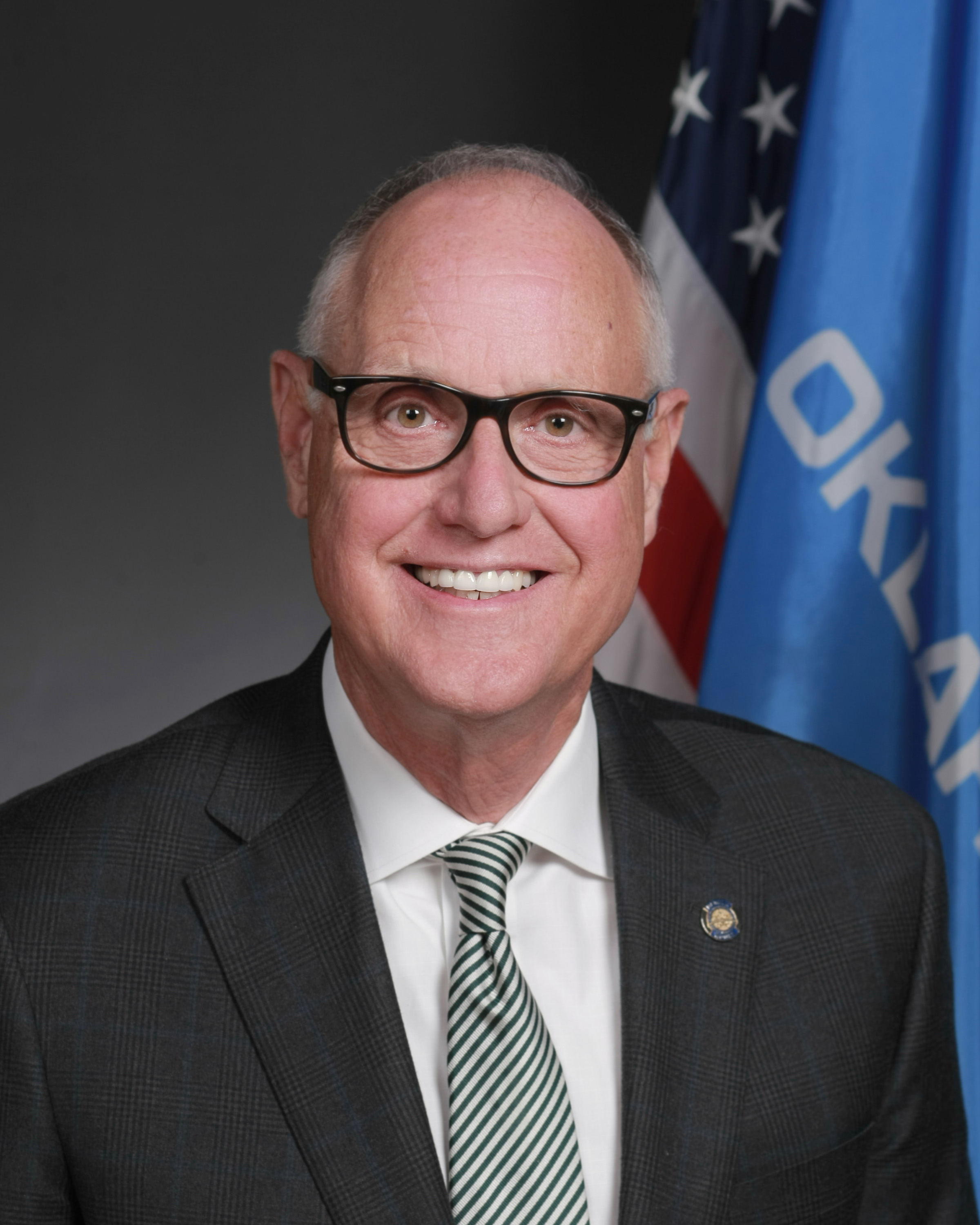

Speaker pro tempore of the Oklahoma House of Representatives
- In office January 3, 2017 – January 5, 2021
- Preceded by: Lee Denney
- Succeeded by: Terry O'Donnell

Member of the Oklahoma House of Representatives from the 57th district
- In office November 18, 2008 – November 16, 2020
- Preceded by: James Covey
- Succeeded by: Anthony Moore

Personal details
- Born: November 12, 1947 (age 79) Weatherford, Oklahoma, U.S.
- Party: Republican
- Education: Oklahoma State University, Stillwater; Southwestern Oklahoma State University, Weatherford (BA)

Harold Wright (born November 12, 1947) is an American politician who served in the Oklahoma House of Representatives from the 57th district from 2008 to 2020.

Oklahoma House of Representatives
Preceded by Lee Denney	Speaker pro tempore of the Oklahoma House of Representatives; 2017–2021	Succeeded by Terry O'Donnell
