= Kyle Hilbert =

American politician from Oklahoma (born 1994)

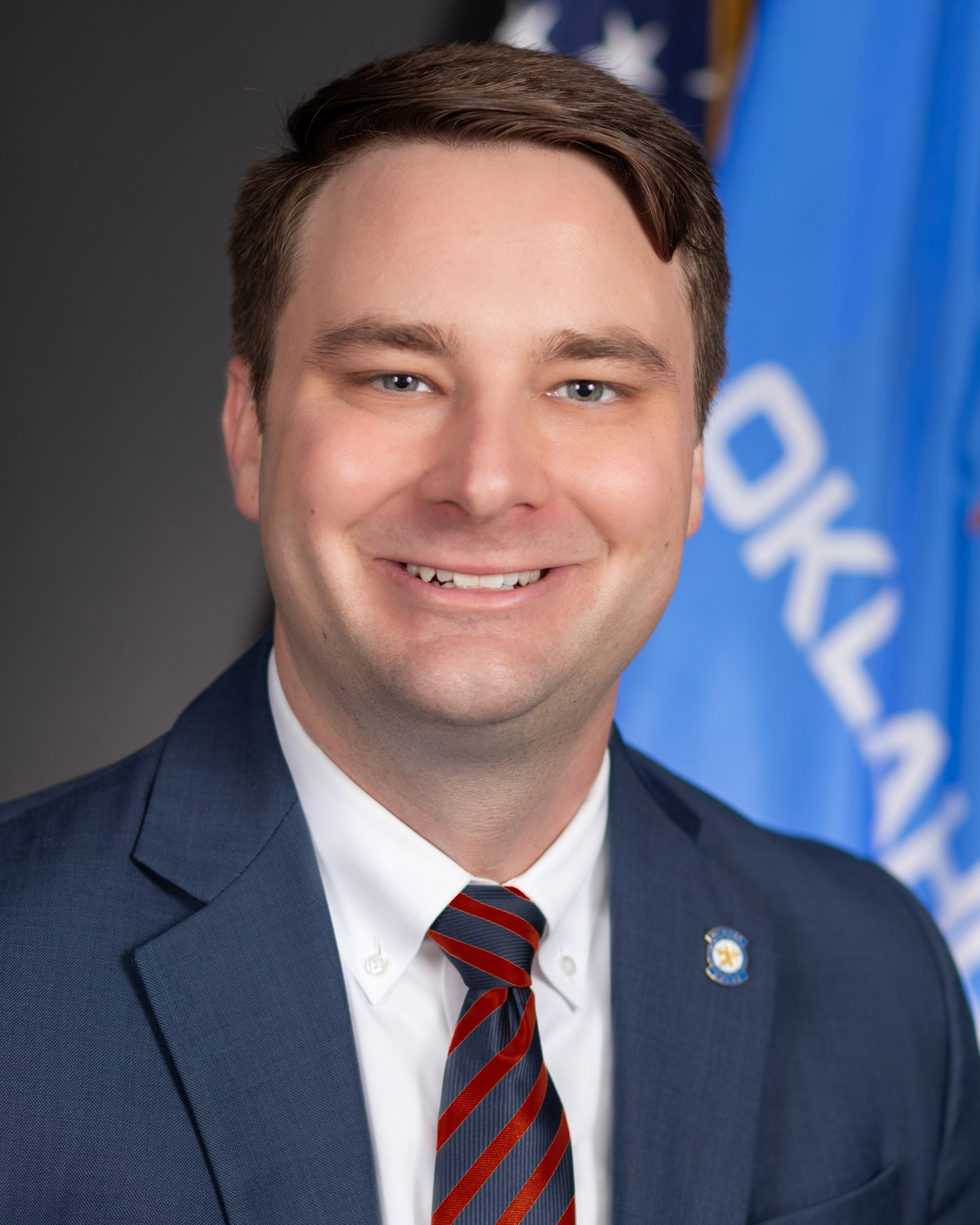

Speaker of the Oklahoma House of Representatives
- Incumbent
- Assumed office January 7, 2025
- Preceded by: Charles McCall

Speaker pro tempore of the Oklahoma House of Representatives
- In office February 8, 2022 – January 7, 2025
- Preceded by: Terry O'Donnell
- Succeeded by: Anthony Moore

Member of the Oklahoma House of Representatives from the 29th district
- Incumbent
- Assumed office November 2016
- Preceded by: James Leewright

Personal details
- Born: March 23, 1994 (age 32) Depew, Oklahoma, U.S.
- Party: Republican
- Education: Oklahoma State University, Stillwater (B.S., MBA)

Kyle Hilbert (born March 23, 1994) is an American Republican member of the Oklahoma House of Representatives and the current Speaker of the Oklahoma House of Representatives. He has represented 29th district of the Oklahoma House of Representatives since 2016.

== Education and family ==
Hilbert attended Depew High School, where he served as president of the Future Farmers of America (FFA) chapter. In 2011, he won the national championship for public speaking at the National FFA Convention in Indianapolis.

Hilbert earned a Bachelor's Degree in Agribusiness from Oklahoma State University. While at OSU, Kyle served as president of the Student Government Association and was named a 2016 OSU Outstanding Senior. In 2024, Hilbert graduated with a Master of Business Administration from Oklahoma State University.

He currently lives in Bristow with his wife and their two daughters.

== Legislative career ==
Hilbert was first elected to serve House District 29, which includes portions of Creek County and Tulsa County, in November 2016. He campaigned while a senior in college and was elected at 22 years old.

=== 56th Legislature ===
As a first-term legislator, Hilbert carried eight bills that were signed into law, was an assistant majority whip, and served on three appropriations subcommittees.

=== 57th Legislature ===
In January 2019, Hilbert was named vice chair of the House Appropriations & Budget Committee as a second-term legislator. He also served as chair of the House Rural Caucus, a bipartisan group of representatives who meet regularly to discuss issues important to rural communities.

Hilbert authored a bill creating a sales tax exemption for medical devices used in the home and prescribed by a medical practitioner. He also introduced legislation allowing voters to take a picture of or with their ballot, which was previously illegal. Hilbert was the House author of Senate Bill 271, which required all state agencies to annually disclose and rank all federally affiliated funds, programs and priorities.

=== 58th Legislature ===
Hilbert championed several major pieces of legislation, including Senate Bill 609, which overhauled Oklahoma's ad valorem tax reimbursement system, and The DRIVE Act, which established an equitable tax structure for electric vehicles in the state of Oklahoma.

In 2021, he served as the House author of Senate Bill 229, which created the Redbud School Funding Act. The bill directs a portion of medical marijuana excise tax revenue for annual distribution to eligible public school districts for acquiring and improving school buildings.

Hilbert authored House Bill 2078, which modernized the education funding formula by basing per-pupil funding on the most recent enrollment data. The previous system gave school districts multiple enrollment figures from which to base their funding, causing some districts to receive state funds for students who were no longer enrolled.

He was elected as the speaker pro tempore of the Oklahoma House of Representatives for the second session on February 8, 2022, becoming the youngest Oklahoma speaker pro tempore in modern history at 27 years old. The position was vacated by Terry O'Donnell after his indictment in a tax agency scandal.

In 2022, he authored legislation requiring school library programs to be reflective of community standards when evaluating new and existing materials.

=== 59th Legislature ===
Hilbert was reelected to his fourth term in November 2022 and was reelected to his first full term as Speaker Pro Tempore in 2023. In mid-April 2023, House Floor Leader Jon Echols steered SB 519 through committee. It "would give charter schools right of first refusal for leasing Commissioners of the Land Office property." During the committee vote, Speaker Pro Tem Kyle Hilbert of Bristow "had to be tracked down to break a 5-5 tie and keep the bill moving."

In March 2024, he was voted as the Speaker of the Oklahoma House of Representatives-elect to succeed Charles McCall in 2025 by the Republican house caucus. He is set to be the youngest speaker in Oklahoma history.

=== 60th Legislature ===
On January 7, 2025, Hilbert was elected Speaker of the Oklahoma House of Representatives. Elected to this position at 30 years old, he is only the second Republican speaker 30 years old or younger in any state since 1873. Hilbert has defended teaching about the historically high turnout in the 2020 United States presidential election as part of the state's public school curriculum. On the final day of the 2025 legislative session, the Oklahoma House of Representatives and the Oklahoma Senate successfully overrode 47 gubernatorial vetoes.

Oklahoma House of Representatives
Preceded by Terry O'Donnell	Speaker pro tempore of the Oklahoma House of Representatives; 2022–2025	Succeeded by Anthony Moore
Political offices
Preceded by Terry O'Donnell	Speaker of the Oklahoma House of Representatives; 2025–present	Incumbent
