= Anthony Moore (politician) =

American politician

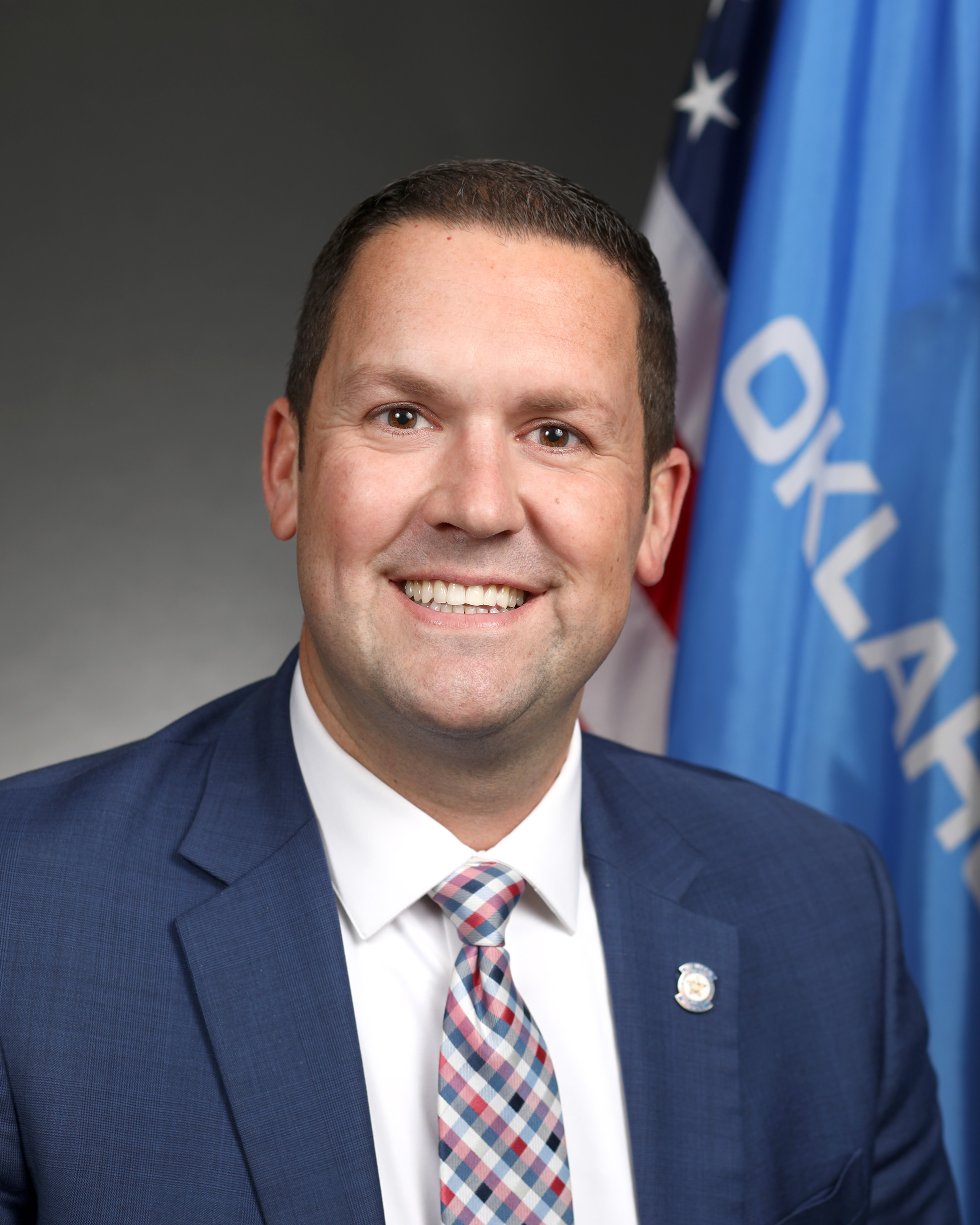

Speaker pro tempore of the Oklahoma House of Representatives
- Incumbent
- Assumed office January 7, 2025
- Preceded by: Kyle Hilbert

Member of the Oklahoma House of Representatives from the 57th district
- Incumbent
- Assumed office November 18, 2020
- Preceded by: Harold Wright

Personal details
- Born: Clinton, Oklahoma, U.S.
- Party: Republican
- Spouse: Rachel Moore
- Children: 3
- Education: Oklahoma Christian University (BA); Oklahoma City University (JD)

Anthony Moore is an American attorney and politician serving as a member of the Oklahoma House of Representatives from the 57th district. He assumed office on November 18, 2020.

== Early life and education ==
Born and raised in Clinton, Oklahoma, Moore attended Clinton High School. He earned a Bachelor of Arts degree in political science and government from Oklahoma Christian University and a Juris Doctor from the Oklahoma City University School of Law. He also studied international law at the University of Granada.

== Career ==
Moore served as an assistant district attorney for Custer County, Latimer County, and Washita County. He has also worked as an attorney at various law firms. Moore was elected to the Oklahoma House of Representatives in November 2020. He also serves as vice chair of the House Energy & Natural Resources Committee. He was one of twenty early Oklahoma lawmakers who endorsed Ron DeSantis for the 2024 presidential election. In November 2024, he was voted Speaker Pro Tempore of the House-elect for the 60th Oklahoma Legislature.

Oklahoma House of Representatives
Preceded by Kyle Hilbert	Speaker pro tempore of the Oklahoma House of Representatives; 2025–present	Incumbent
