= Anastasia Pittman =

American politician (born 1970)

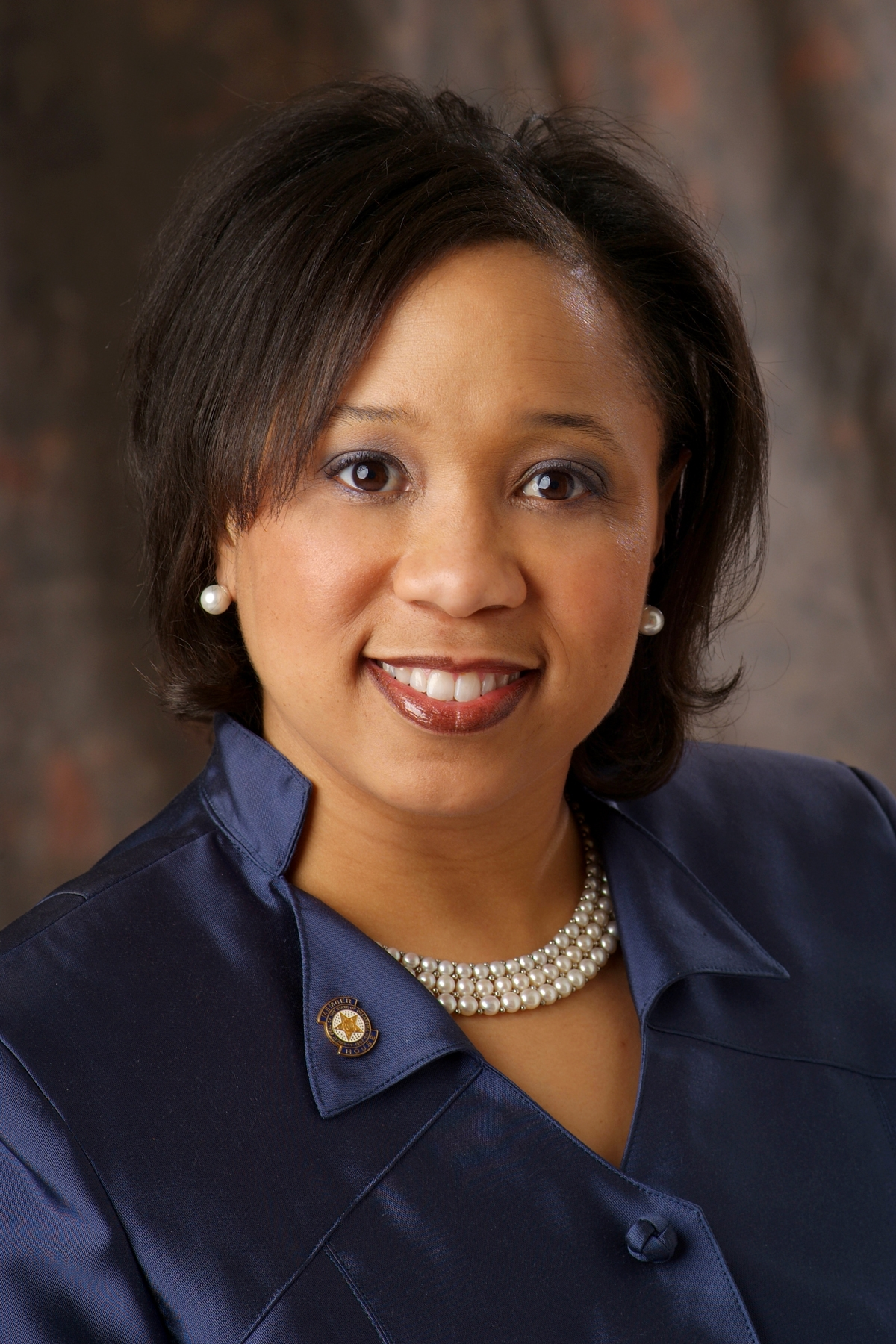

Member of the Seminole Nation General Council
- Incumbent
- Assumed office 2021
- Constituency: Dosar Barkus Band

Member of the Oklahoma Senate from the 48th district
- In office November 16, 2014 – November 16, 2018
- Preceded by: Constance N. Johnson
- Succeeded by: George E. Young

Member of the Oklahoma House of Representatives from the 99th district
- In office November 16, 2006 – November 16, 2014
- Preceded by: Opio Toure
- Succeeded by: George Young

Personal details
- Born: July 19, 1970 (age 56) Miami, Florida, U.S.
- Citizenship: American; Seminole Nation
- Party: Democratic
- Children: Ajay Pittman
- Education: University of Oklahoma (BA); Langston University (MEd)

Anastasia A. Pittman (born July 19, 1970) is an American and Seminole politician. She has served on the Seminole Nation General Council since 2021 representing the Dosar Barkus Band.

She represented the 99th district in the Oklahoma House of Representatives, as a member of the Democratic Party. Pittman served in the House from 2006 to 2014. In April 2014, she filed to run for an Oklahoma Senate seat vacated by Constance N. Johnson. Pittman was elected to the Oklahoma Senate and represented the 48th district until 2018. In 2018, she was the Democratic Party nominee for lieutenant governor in Oklahoma.

== Early life ==
Pittman was born on July 19, 1970, in Miami, Florida. Her mother was also a member of the Seminole Nation of Oklahoma. Her family moved back and forth from Miami to Oklahoma City every summer. During one summer, Pittman's parents did not return on time for her and her brother and their grandmother enrolled them in school in Oklahoma. Pittman's grandmother later became her legal guardian and Pittman finished high school and college in Oklahoma. Pittman graduated from Star Spencer High School.

=== Education ===
She earned a Bachelor of Arts degree in journalism and public relations in 1999 from the University of Oklahoma and a Master's degree in Education and Behavioral Science from Langston University in 2002.

== Oklahoma legislature ==
=== House of Representatives ===
She served in the Oklahoma House of Representatives from 2006 to 2014. In 2013 Pittman was selected to lead the Legislative Black Caucus of the Oklahoma Legislature.

=== Oklahoma Senate ===
Pittman served in the Oklahoma Senate between 2014 and 2018.

=== 2016 and 2018 campaigns ===
Pittman ran for Oklahoma County Clerk in 2016, losing to Rick Warren.

Pittman ran for Lieutenant Governor of Oklahoma in 2018, facing Anna Dearmore in the Democratic primary. She won the Democratic primary with 50.4% of the vote. She lost the general election to Matt Pinnell, receiving 34.5% of the vote.

== Seminole Nation of Oklahoma General Council ==
Pittman ran for one of the Dosar Barkus Band's seat in 2021 against three other candidates, with the two top vote earners winning a seat. Pittman and Terry Loy Edwards won the election.

== 2022 and 2025 Oklahoma County Commissioner campaigns ==
Pittman announced her intention to run against incumbent Oklahoma County Commissioner Carrie Blumert in November 2021. Blumert and Pittman also faced Christine Byrd and Kendra Coleman, an Oklahoma County District Judge removed from office in September 2020 for misconduct. Pittman placed first in the June primary and advanced to a runoff alongside Blumert. She lost the August runoff to Blumert.

Pittman filed to run for a special election to fill an open seat on the Oklahoma County Board of Commissioners in December 2024. Incumbent commissioner Carrie Blumert resigned to work in the private sector, triggering a special election. In the February Democratic primary she faced Midwest City councilor Sara Bana and state representative Jason Lowe. Lowe won the Democratic primary.

== Electoral history ==
2006 Oklahoma House District 99 Democratic primary
Party	Candidate	Votes	%
Democratic	Anastasia Pittman	1,421	44.55%
Democratic	Larry Foster II	1,115	34.95%
Democratic	Tom Nash	257	8.06%
Democratic	Wayne Chandler Jr	237	7.43%
Democratic	Greg Nelson	160	5.02%
Turnout		3,190	

2006 Oklahoma House District 99 Democratic primary runoff
Party	Candidate	Votes	%
Democratic	Anastasia Pittman	1,322	58.44%
Democratic	Larry Foster II	940	41.56%
Turnout		2,262	

2006 Oklahoma House District 99 Election
Party	Candidate	Votes	%
Democratic	Anastasia Pittman	4,886	76.85%
Republican	Willard Linzy	1,166	18.34%
Independent	J. M. Branum	306	4.81%
Turnout		6,358	

2008 Oklahoma House District 99 Democratic primary
Party	Candidate	Votes	%
Democratic	Anastasia Pittman	1,357	91.50%
Democratic	Larry Foster II	126	8.50%
Turnout		1,483	

2008 Oklahoma House District 99 Election
Party	Candidate	Votes	%
Democratic	Anastasia Pittman	10,480	83.22%
Republican	Willard Linzy	2,113	16.78%
Turnout		12,593	

2012 Oklahoma House District 99 Election
Party	Candidate	Votes	%
Democratic	Anastasia Pittman	10,641	83.49%
Republican	Willard Linzy	2,104	16.51%
Turnout		12,745	

2014 Oklahoma Senate District 48 Democratic primary
Party	Candidate	Votes	%
Democratic	Anastasia Pittman	5,659	84.80%
Democratic	Christine Byrd	1,014	15.20%%
Turnout		6,673	

2014 Oklahoma Senate District 48 Election
Party	Candidate	Votes	%
Democratic	Anastasia Pittman	14,254	83.01%
Republican	Duane Crumbacher	2,917	16.99%
Turnout		17,171	

2016 Oklahoma County Court Clerk election
Party	Candidate	Votes	%
Republican	Rick Warren	152,379	56.63%
Democratic	Anastasia Pittman	116,681	43.37%
Turnout		269,060	

2018 Oklahoma Lieutenant governor Democratic Primary
Party	Candidate	Votes	%
Democratic	Anastasia Pittman	188,892	50.42%
Democratic	Anna Dearmore	185,769	49.58%
Turnout		374,661	

2018 Oklahoma Lieutenant governor Election
Party	Candidate	Votes	%
Republican	Matt Pinnell	729,219	61.89%
Democratic	Anastasia Pittman	406,797	34.53%
Independent	Ivan Holmes	42,174	3.58%
Turnout		1,178,190	

2021 Seminole Nation of Oklahoma Dosar Barkus Band representative election
Candidate	Votes	%
Anastasia Pittman	81	47.37%
Terry Loy Edwards	60	35.09%
Sylvia Davis	17	9.94%
Patrick Thomas	13	7.60%
Total votes	171	100%

2022 Oklahoma County District 1 Commissioner Democratic primary
Party	Candidate	Votes	%
Democratic	Anastasia Pittman	7,841	38.64%
Democratic	Carrie Blumert	7,247	35.71%
Democratic	Kendra Coleman	3,451	17.01%
Democratic	Christine Byrd	1,754	8.64%
Turnout		20,293	

2022 Oklahoma County District 1 Commissioner Democratic primary runoff
Party	Candidate	Votes	%
Democratic	Carrie Blumert	6,173	50.49%
Democratic	Anastasia Pittman	6,052	49.51%
Turnout		12,225	

2025 Oklahoma County District 1 Commissioner Democratic special primary
Party	Candidate	Votes	%
Democratic	Jason Lowe	4,244	40.61%
Democratic	Anastasia Pittman	3,315	31.72%
Democratic	Sara Bana	2,891	27.67%
Turnout		10450	

Anastasia Pittman was reelected to the Seminole Nation of Oklahoma's General Council without opposition in 2025.

Oklahoma House of Representatives
Preceded by Opio Toure	Member of the Oklahoma House of Representatives from the 99th district 2007–2015	Succeeded by George Young
Oklahoma Senate
Preceded by Connie Johnson	Member of the Oklahoma Senate from the 48th district 2014–2018	Succeeded by George Young
Party political offices
Preceded by Cathy Cummings	Democratic nominee for Lieutenant Governor of Oklahoma; 2018	Succeeded by Melinda Alizadeh-Fard
