= Oklahoma City Council =

Unicameral legislature of Oklahoma City, Oklahoma

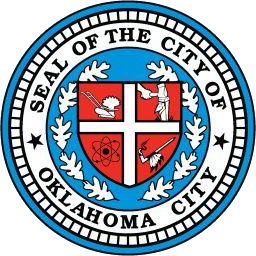

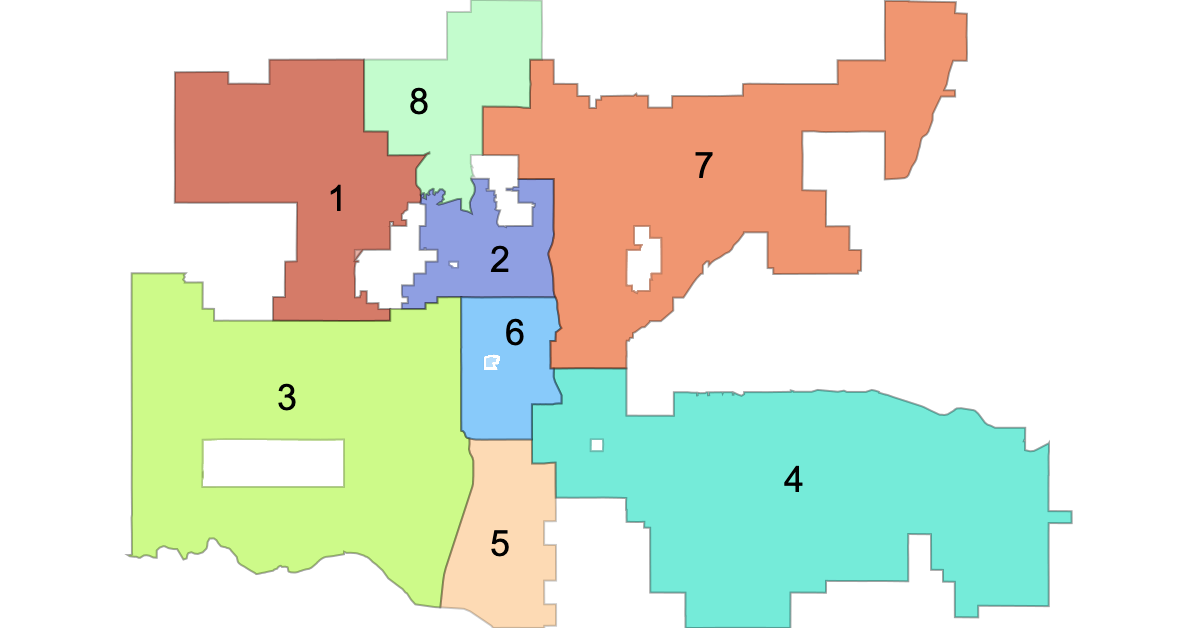
- Ward map of Oklahoma City, effective 1 April 2022.

Type
- Type: Unicameral
- Term limits: None

Leadership
- Mayor: David Holt (R)
- Vice Mayor: JoBeth Hamon (D)

Structure
- Seats: 9
- Political groups: officially nonpartisan Majority: Republican (6); Minority: Democratic (3)
- Length of term: 4 years

Elections
- Last election: April 4, 2023
- Next election: February 11, 2025

Meeting place
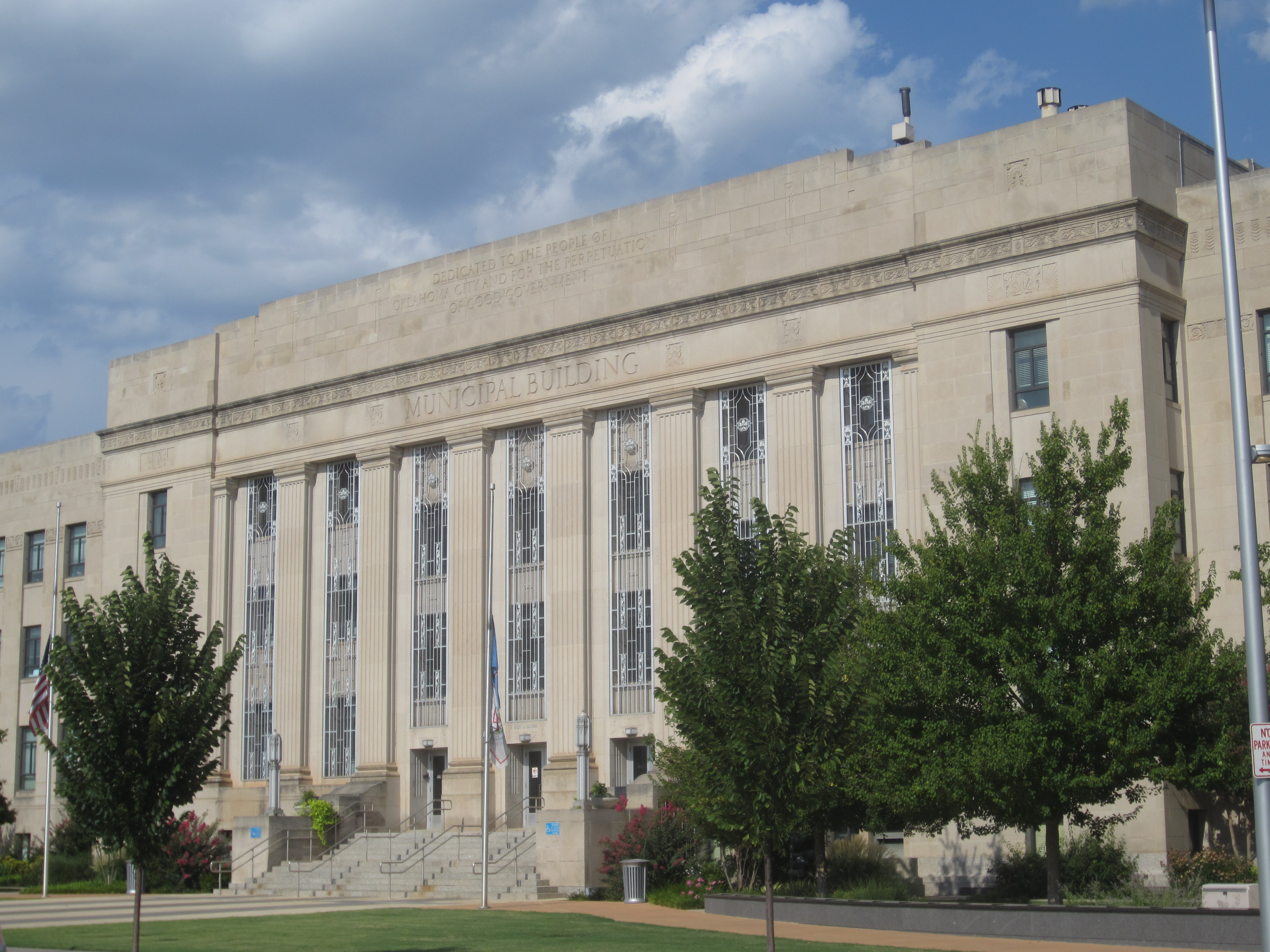
- Oklahoma City Municipal Building

Website
- City Council - City of OKC

The Oklahoma City Council is the unicameral legislative body of the City of Oklahoma City, Oklahoma. The form of government of Oklahoma City is a council-manager government, therefore the mayor is included as a member of the city council. The current mayor is David Holt. The mayor serves as President of the Council and presides over all council meetings. The city council must set policy, enact ordinances, and authorize expenditures of City funds. Although the council is nonpartisan, six of the nine members are associated with the Republican Party.

== Members ==
Ward	Name	Party (officially nonpartisan)	Term start	Location	References
Mayor	David Holt	Republican	April 10, 2018	Citywide	
1	Bradley Carter	Republican	April 6, 2021	West, Northwest, Lake Overholser	
2	James Cooper	Democratic	April 9, 2019	Central, Inner Northside	
3	Katrina Avers	Republican	April 29, 2025	West, Southwest, Will Rogers World Airport	
4	Todd Stone	Republican	April 4, 2017	Southeast, Lake Stanley Draper, Tinker Air Force Base	
5	Matt Hinkle	Republican	April 4, 2023	South, Far South-central	
6	JoBeth Hamon	Democratic	April 9, 2019	Central, Downtown, Inner Southside	
7	Camal Pennington	Democratic	April 29, 2025	East, Northeast, Oklahoma State Capitol	
8	Mark Stonecipher	Republican	April 2015	Far North, Northwest, Lake Hefner	

== History ==
Oklahoma City was founded on April 22, 1889 as the Village of Oklahoma. On May 1, 1889, ten days after the founding of the city, an election was held that selected the first mayor, William James Gault, and two wards were established. Oklahoma village became the county seat of County Two (present-day Oklahoma County) at the passage of the Oklahoma Organic Act on May 2, 1890. The townsite of 5,000 residents was incorporated on July 15, 1890 as the Village of Oklahoma City by commissioners of County Two. The Oklahoma City Council held their first meeting on July 22, 1890 and passed Ordinance No. 1 that divided the city into four wards. Each ward had two council members, one serving for one year and the other for two years.

The first City Charter was approved by city voters and Oklahoma Governor Lee Cruce in March 1911. In 1926, the office of city manager was created and the city adopted the council-manager form of government.

On April 9, 2019, James Cooper became the first openly-gay man, and also the first person of color outside of Ward 7, to serve on the council.
