= HIV Prevention Act of 1997 =

Proposed law

The HIV Prevention Act of 1997 was proposed U.S. legislation that was not acted on by either house of Congress.

The bill would have brought policy towards HIV/AIDS, often referred to as 'AIDS exceptionalism', in line with the public health approach used for other infectious diseases. It would have established confidential HIV reporting and partner notification nationwide, required accused sex offenders to be tested for HIV, and allowed health-care providers to test for HIV before exposing their employees in the course of an invasive medical procedure. It recommended that States enact laws providing that intentionally infecting others with HIV is a felony. The bill was endorsed by the American Medical News.

== Legislative history ==
Representative Thomas Coburn (R-Oklahoma) introduced it in the House on March 13, 1997, and Senator Don Nickles (R-Oklahoma) introduced it in the Senate. The legislation was referred to the House Committee on Commerce on March 13, 1997, and to its Subcommittee on Health and Environment on March 21, 1997. No further action was taken in either chamber. The Senate referred the legislation to the Committee on Labor and Human Resources. Coburn had introduced similar legislation the year before with similar results.

About the same time as this legislation was introduced, Representative Nancy Pelosi(D-California) introduced the William A. Bailey Comprehensive HIV Prevention Act of 1997 on March 21, 1997. It would have amended the Public Health Service Act to promote activities for the prevention of additional cases of infection HIV. It too was referred to committee and never acted upon.

== Provisions ==
The legislation asserted that:

- The term HIV disease more accurately describes the public health problem than Human Immunodeficiency Virus (HIV) or AIDS, its later manifestation.
- Federal and State data collection efforts should focus on obtaining data as early as possible after infection occurs, while continuing to collect data on the symptomatic stage of the disease.
- HIV disease can be addressed as a chronic disease rather than as a terminal disease. Early intervention is critical.
- The Centers for Disease Control and Prevention has recommended partner notification as a primary prevention service. The health needs of the general public, and the care and protection of those who do not have the disease, should be balanced with the needs of individuals with the disease in a manner that allows for the infected individuals to receive optimal medical care and for public health services to protect the uninfected.

The act proposed amending the Social Security Act:

- All positive HIV test results would be reported to a state public health officer for statistical purposes and to enable a program of partner notification.
- Defendants in rape cases would be tested within 48 hours of an indictment, with the results of the test being made available to everyone involved and available for use in court.
- Health professionals and people working for a funeral home would be able to require an HIV test before performing their services.
- Health insurance issuers would be entitled to see the results of an HIV test at their request.
- Adoptive parents would be entitled to see the HIV test results of a child before completing the final stages of the adoption process.
- Health professionals with an HIV infection would be required to inform patients of their HIV status where there was a risk of infection.
- The States should have in effect laws providing that intentionally infecting others with HIV is a felony.
- Strict confidentiality should be maintained in carrying out the provisions of section 1930A of the Social Security Act.
- Any state that fails to comply with this legislation is denied all federal Medicaid funding.

== Concerns ==
Many concerns emerged that involved the HIV Prevention Act of 1997. Those included medical privacy and economical issues.

=== Economic concerns ===
The Association of State and Territorial Health Officers (ASTHO) estimated that implementation of the legislation would require at least 265 statutory or regulatory changes nationwide and cost approximately $420 million a year, though it provided no new money to finance any of these amendments. For individuals, it would not have supplied for following testing and notification with health care and provides no money, for example, to make protease inhibitors available to those who test positive.

=== Medical privacy concerns ===
The Act proposed that states report the identity of anyone testing positive for HIV to federal authorities, along with the names of their sexual and intravenous-injection partners. It charged the Centers for Disease Control and Prevention (CDC) with establishing a notification system for sharing these identities with all states to locate and inform individuals who might have been infected with the disease. It required all states to participate notification system despite the fact that some states already have an existing surveillance/identifier system that estimate the number of people infected with HIV from anonymous demographic information. The concern involves privacy issues, along with the fact that no other existing disease is required to be reported and examined by the CDC.

The legislation would eliminate anonymous testing options, such as the HIV sample collection kits. Those who appose mandatory names reporting prefer using unique identifiers and sentinel studies, for they believe that national partner notification may even discourage people from being tested in the first place.

Some claim that the national partner notification policy would be unnecessary, for it is already required to have partner notification programs in order to receive funds from the CDC for HIV prevention and Control. The Ryan White Care Act Amendments of 1996 also requires states to notify a spouse of a known HIV-infected patient that he or she may have been exposed to HIV and should seek testing. In addition, some criticize the belief that the Bill includes a sense of the Congress urging states to criminalize the intentional transmission of HIV.

== See also ==
- Ryan White Care Act of 1990
