= Partner services =

Public health term

Partner services is a public health term which refers to the health intervention given to a client's intimate partners when a client goes to a health care provider requesting health care.

Partner notification is a type of partner service, wherein if someone has a contagious disease, the health care provider finding the problem will try to notify that person's partners that they have been exposed to infection. It is a form of contact tracing.

Partner services are important because in some cases a person's health problems are partially caused or sustained by other people. A common example would be that a person visits a doctor because he has an infectious disease. If that disease is also contagious, then that person's close associates may also have the disease. If a physician were to only treat the person who initially requests treatment, then the disease may remain in the community. Instead, principles of partner services dictate that health care should treat all members of a group which transmits infection.

== Examples ==
Partner services are frequently discussed in the treatment of sexually transmitted infections (STI). If one person has a sexually transmitted infection, then any sexual partner that person has is at risk to get that infection. A common practice after identifying a person who has an STI is to ask that person to identify any sexual partners so that the clinic can contact them and arrange for them to receive STI testing, treatment, and counseling.

Another example is the case in which two people are in an intimate relationship, such as a marriage. One partner may be dissatisfied with the relationship and seek counseling. In this case, the counselor may advise that if the other partner in the relationship does not also participate in counseling then improvement in the relationship might be difficult. In this case, the counselor would assist the person making the complaint in arranging partner services.

== List of conditions for which partner services are often used ==
Public health offices are often directed to offer partner services for sexually transmitted infections, including the following:

- HIV
- syphilis
- chlamydia
- gonorrhea
- hepatitis A
- hepatitis B

Mental health professionals often recommend partner services when clients express interest in treatment for many problems, including the following:

- substance abuse, including alcoholism
- Relationship counseling
- depression
- and many other mental disorders

The intention is that often a person will benefit from the support of close friends, family, and significant others when getting treatment for a mental problem.

== Benefits ==
Partner services help the original client have better health, and improve the health of that client's close associates, and benefit the community by relieving the burden of retaining an infectious reservoir of endemic health problems.
