= 2004 United States Senate election in Oklahoma =

- November 2, 2004
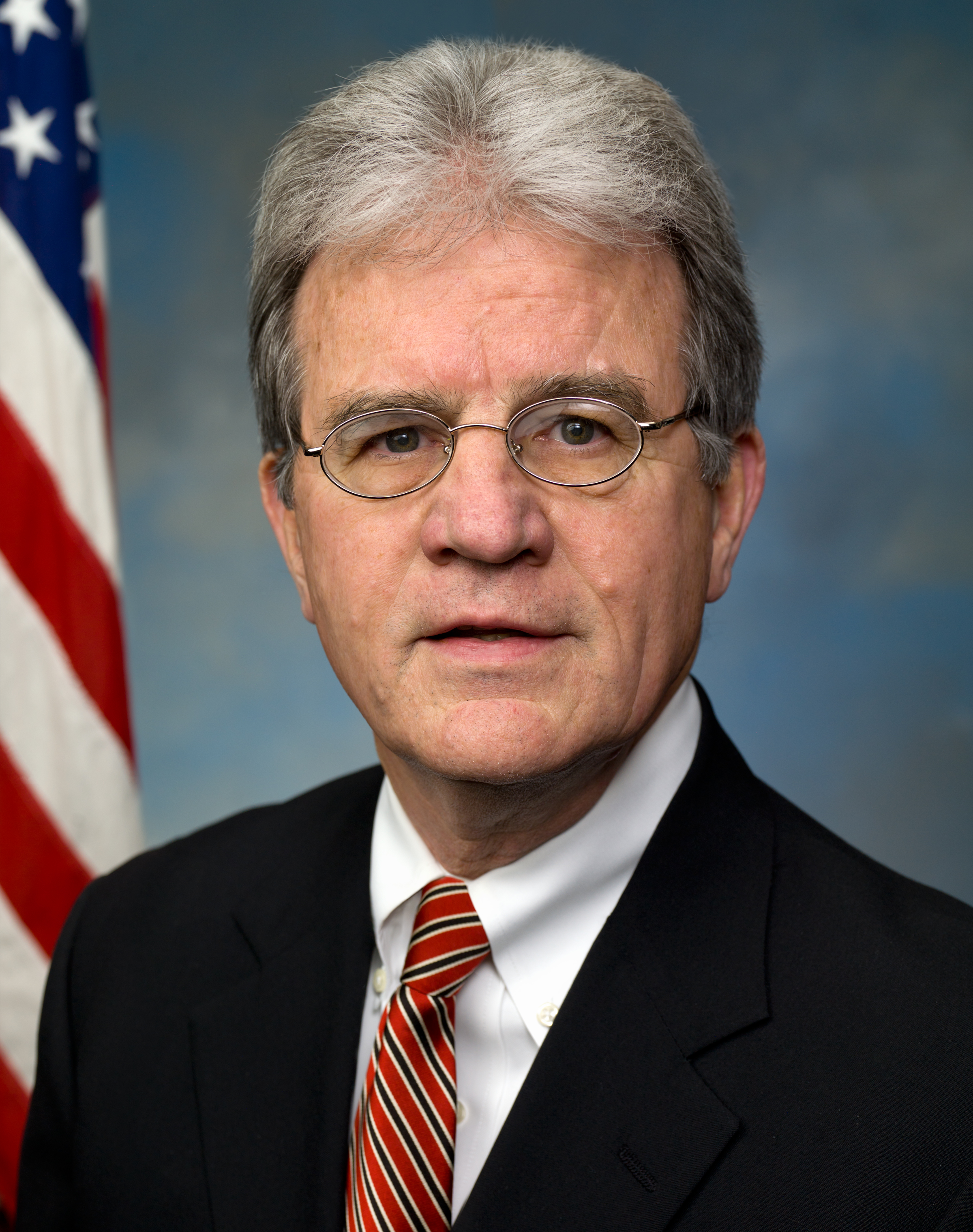

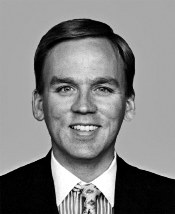

Nominee	Tom Coburn	Brad Carson	Sheila Bilyeu
Party	Republican	Democratic	Independent
Popular vote	763,433	596,750	86,663
Percentage	52.77%	41.24%	5.99%
- County results Coburn: 40–50% 50–60% 60–70% 70–80% Carson: 40–50% 50–60%
U.S. senator before election
Don Nickles
Republican
Elected U.S. Senator
Tom Coburn
Republican

The 2004 United States Senate election in Oklahoma took place on November 2, 2004. The election was concurrent with elections to the United States House of Representatives and the presidential election. Incumbent Senator Don Nickles decided to retire instead of seeking a fifth term. Fellow Republican Tom Coburn won the open seat. This was the last open-seat Oklahoma U.S. Senate race until 2026, and the last election for this seat in which the Republican nominee did not win every county.

== Democratic primary ==
=== Candidates ===
- Brad Carson, U.S. representative
- Carroll Fisher, Oklahoma insurance commissioner
- Monte E. Johnson, attorney
- Jim Rogers, perennial candidate
- W. B. G. Woodson

=== Polling ===
Poll source	Date(s) administered	Sample size	Margin of error	Brad Carson	Carroll Fisher	Jim Rogers	Monte Johnson	W. B. G. Woodson	Undecided/ Other
SurveyUSA	June 25–27, 2004	563 (LV)	± 4.2%	61%	15%	6%	4%	1%	13%
Wilson Research Strategies	May 20–21, 2004	300 (RV)	± 5.7%	45%	7%		3%		45%

=== Results ===
Democratic primary results
Party	Candidate	Votes	%
Democratic	Brad Carson	280,026	79.37%
Democratic	Carroll Fisher	28,385	8.05%
Democratic	Jim Rogers	20,179	5.72%
Democratic	Monte E. Johnson	17,274	4.90%
Democratic	W. B. G. Woodson	6,932	1.96%
Total votes		352,796	100.00%

== Republican primary ==
=== Candidates ===
- Bob Anthony, Oklahoma corporation commissioner
- Tom Coburn, former U.S. representative
- Kirk Humphreys, former mayor of Oklahoma City
- Jay Richard Hunt, activist

=== Campaign ===
Humphreys, the former mayor of Oklahoma City, ran for the United States Senate with institutional conservative support, namely from Senators Don Nickles and Jim Inhofe, as well as former Congressman J. C. Watts. However, Coburn received support from the Club for Growth and conservative activists within Oklahoma. Humphreys noted, "[Coburn is] kind of a cult hero in the conservative portion of our party, not just in Oklahoma. You can't get right of the guy." Much of Coburn's celebrity within the Republican Party came from his tenure in Congress, where he battled House Speaker Newt Gingrich, who he argued was moving the party to the center of the political spectrum due to their excessive federal spending. Coburn's maverick nature culminated itself in 2000 when he backed conservative activist Alan Keyes for President rather than George W. Bush or John McCain.

Ultimately, Coburn triumphed over Humphreys, Anthony, and Hunt in the primary, winning every county in Oklahoma except for tiny Harmon County.

=== Polling ===
Poll source	Date(s) administered	Sample size	Margin of error	Tom Coburn	Kirk Humphreys	Bob Anthony	Jay Richard Hunt	Linda Murphy	Undecided/ Other
SurveyUSA	July 23–25, 2004	517 (LV)	± 4.4%	54%	25%	13%			8%
SurveyUSA	July 16–18, 2004	436 (LV)	± 4.8%	46%	32%	12%			10%
Club for Growth (R)	July 11–12, 2004	500 (LV)	± 4.4%	51%	22%	8%			19%
Consumer Logic	July 8–12, 2004	291 (RV)	± 5.9%	37%	34%	7%	1%		21%
SurveyUSA	June 25–27, 2004	408 (LV)	± 5%	38%	34%	16%			12%
CMA Strategies (R)	June 6–8, 2004	400 (LV)	± 5%	34%	36%	10%			20%
Wilson Research Strategies	May 20–21, 2004	300 (RV)	± 5.7%	21%	21%	11%		5%	42%
Consumer Logic	Mar 26–Apr 5, 2004		± 5.9%	34%	22%	12%			32%

=== Results ===
Republican primary results
Party	Candidate	Votes	%
Republican	Tom Coburn	145,974	61.23%
Republican	Kirk Humphreys	59,877	25.12%
Republican	Bob Anthony	29,596	12.41%
Republican	Jay Richard Hunt	2,944	1.23%
Total votes		238,391	100.00%

== General election ==
=== Candidates ===
- Sheila Bilyeu (I), perennial candidate
- Brad Carson (D), United States congressman from Oklahoma's 2nd congressional district
- Tom Coburn (R), former United States congressman from Oklahoma's 2nd congressional district

=== Campaign ===
Carson and Coburn engaged each other head-on in one of the year's most brutal Senate contests. Coburn and the National Republican Senatorial Committee attacked Carson for being too liberal for Oklahoma and for being a vote in lockstep with John Kerry, Hillary Clinton, and Ted Kennedy. To drive the point home, one television advertisement aired by the Coburn campaign accused Carson of being "dangerously liberal" and not supporting the war on terrorism. Coburn was aided in this effort by the fact that the Kerry campaign did not contest the state of Oklahoma and that incumbent President George W. Bush was expected to win Oklahoma comfortably. This was compounded by the fact that Vice-President Dick Cheney campaigned for Coburn and appeared in several television advertisements for him. Carson countered by emphasizing his Stilwell roots and his moderation, specifically, bringing attention to the fact that he fought for greater governmental oversight of nursing home care for the elderly. Carson responded to the attacks against him by countering that his opponent had committed Medicaid fraud years prior, in an event that reportedly left a woman sterilized without her consent. Ultimately, however, Carson was not able to overcome Oklahoma's conservative nature and Senator Kerry's abysmal performance in Oklahoma, and he was defeated by Coburn by 11.5%. As of 2026, the result remains the closest the Democrats have come to winning a Senate election in Oklahoma since David Boren won a landslide reelection victory in 1990.

=== Predictions ===
Source	Ranking	As of
Sabato's Crystal Ball	Lean R	November 1, 2004

=== Polling ===
Poll source	Date(s) administered	Sample size	Margin of error	Tom Coburn (R)	Brad Carson (D)	Sheila Bilyeu (I)	Undecided/ Other
SurveyUSA	October 28–30, 2004	656 (LV)	± 3.9%	47%	39%	8%	6%
Sooner Poll	October 27–28, 2004	498 (LV)	± 4.4%	44.4%	35.1%	4.2%	16.3%
Wilson Research Strategies	October 22–24, 2004	500 (LV)	± 4.5%	41%	38%	6%	15%
Sooner Poll	October 20–21, 2004	500 (LV)	± 4.4%	38.0%	36.8%	5.8%	19.4%
Rasmussen Reports	October 20, 2004	500 (LV)	± 4.5%	48%	43%		9%
SurveyUSA	October 18–20, 2004	625 (LV)	± 4%	47%	41%	8%	4%
Global Strategy Group (D)	August 18–20, 2004	600 (LV)	± 4%	44%	45%		11%
Consumer Logic	October 14–19, 2004	750 (RV)	± 3.6%	40%	47%		13%
Wilson Research Strategies	October 15–17, 2004	500 (LV)	± 4.4%	42.2%	39.0%	3.6%	14.4%
Sooner Poll	October 14, 2004	300 (LV)	± 5.7%	40.6%	43.3%	2.0%	14.1%
Cole, Hargrave, Snodgrass & Associates (R)	October 10–11, 2004	500 (RV)	± 4.3%	46%	41%	3%	10%
Wilson Research Strategies	October 8–10, 2004	500 (LV)	± 4.5%	37.8%	40.0%	7.2%	15.0%
Sooner Poll	October 7, 2004	330 (LV)	± 5.4%	39.2%	39.8%		21.0%
SurveyUSA	October 4–6, 2004	609 (LV)	± 4.1%	46%	44%	5%	5%
Wilson Research Strategies	October 1–3, 2004	500 (LV)	± 4.5%	41.2%	42.6%	2.4%	13.8%
Sooner Poll	September 28–29, 2004	553 (LV)	± 4.1%	37.2%	44.1%		18.7%
Basswood Research (R)	September 27, 2004		± 4.4%	41.0%	39.6%	2.4%	17.0%
Wilson Research Strategies	September 24–26, 2004	500 (LV)	± 4.5%	39.2%	44.2%	3.2%	13.4%
Global Strategy Group (D)	September 24, 2004	600 (LV)	± 4%	40%	44%		16%
Sooner Poll	September 22, 2004	394 (LV)	± 4.9%	37.0%	39.8%		23.2%
SurveyUSA	September 20–22, 2004	610 (LV)	± 4%	45%	45%	6%	4%
Wilson Research Strategies	September 17–19, 2004	500 (LV)	± 4.4%	40%	41%	2%	17%
Sooner Poll	September 15, 2004	412 (LV)	± 4.8%	35%	42%		23%
Wilson Research Strategies	September 10–12, 2004	500 (LV)	± 4.4%	37%	39%	6%	18%
Wilson Research Strategies	September 3–5, 2004	500 (LV)	± 4.4%	42%	36%	5%	17%
Westhill Partners	September 1–2, 2004	400 (LV)	± 5%	42%	44%	1%	13%
SurveyUSA	August 16–18, 2004	586 (LV)	± 4.1%	47%	43%		10%
Wilson Research Strategies	August 15–18, 2004	300 (LV)	± 5.6%	46%	37%	2%	15%
Cole, Hargrave, Snodgrass & Associates (R)	August 10–12, 2004	500 (RV)	± 4.3%	47%	39%		14%
Global Strategy Group (D)	August 8–11, 2004	600 (LV)	± 4%	45%	43%		12%
Basswood Research (R)	July 29, 2004	600 (LV)	± 4%	43.5%	31.8%		24.7%
Consumer Logic	July 8–12, 2004	825 (RV)	± 3.4%	39%	42%		21%
Wilson Research Strategies	June 28–29, 2004	500 (LV)	± 4.4%	37%	35%	1%	27%
Wilson Research Strategies	May 20–21, 2004	500 (RV)	± 4.4%	41%	39%		20%
Consumer Logic	Mar 26–Apr 5, 2004	825 (RV)	± 3.4%	35%	37%		28%

Hypothetical polling

Poll source	Date(s) administered	Sample size	Margin of error	Kirk Humphreys (R)	Brad Carson (D)	Sheila Bilyeu (I)	Undecided/ Other
Consumer Logic	July 8–12, 2004	825 (RV)	± 3.4%	38%	47%		15%
Wilson Research Strategies	June 28–29, 2004	500 (LV)	± 4.4%	34%	41%	2%	23%

Poll source	Date(s) administered	Sample size	Margin of error	Bob Anthony (R)	Brad Carson (D)	Sheila Bilyeu (I)	Undecided/ Other
Wilson Research Strategies	June 28–29, 2004	500 (LV)	± 4.4%	34%	39%	2%	25%

=== Results ===
2004 United States Senate election in Oklahoma
Party	Candidate	Votes	%	±%
Republican	Tom Coburn	763,433	52.77%	−13.62%
Democratic	Brad Carson	596,750	41.24%	+9.97%
Independent	Sheila Bilyeu	86,663	5.99%	
Majority		166,683	11.52%	−23.58%
Turnout		1,446,846		
Republican hold		Swing		

==== Counties that flipped from Republican to Democratic ====
- Atoka (largest city: Atoka)
- Bryan (largest city: Durant)
- Caddo (largest city: Anadarko)
- Coal (largest city: Coalgate)
- Cotton (largest city: Walters)
- Craig (largest city: Vinita)
- Greer (largest city: Mangum)
- Harmon (largest city: Hollis)
- Jefferson (largest city: Waurika)
- Johnston (largest city: Tishomingo)
- Kiowa (largest city: Hobart)
- Le Flore (largest city: Poteau)
- Love (largest city: Marietta)
- Marshall (largest city: Madill)
- Mayes (largest city: Pryor Creek)
- Murray (largest city: Sulphur)
- Nowata (largest city: Nowata)
- Okfuskee (largest city: Okemah)
- Osage (largest city: Hominy)
- Pittsburg (largest city: McAlester)
- Pushmataha (largest city: Antlers)
- Seminole (largest city: Seminole)
- Sequoyah (largest city: Sallisaw)
- Tillman (largest city: Frederick)
- Cherokee (largest city: Tahlequah)
- Choctaw (largest city: Hugo)
- Hughes (largest city: Holdenville)
- Latimer (largest city: Wilburton)
- McIntosh (largest city: Checotah)
- Muskogee (largest city: Muskogee)
- Okmulgee (largest city: Okmulgee)
- Ottawa (largest city: Miami)
- Delaware (largest city: Grove)
- Adair (largest city: Stilwell)

== See also ==
- 2004 United States Senate elections
