= Imedexchange =

iMedExchange Inc.
- Company type: Private
- Industry: Online Community; Social Network
- Founded: Seattle (2007)
- Headquarters: Seattle, Washington, United States
- Key people: Tobin Arthur, Founder/CEO; Bob Crimmins, Founder
- Products: VitalSigns
- Number of employees: 20
- Website: www.imedexchange.com

iMedexchange is a private online community for M.D.s and D.O.s in the United States. iMedexchange provides a free venue for resources, tools and discussions to be shared between physicians.

== History ==
iMedexchange was founded in 2007 by Tobin Arthur and Bob Crimmins. The start-up is credited with assembling a nationwide physician advisory board, which includes 30 advisers and investors from the St. Louis area. The site launched in June 2008 with $2.5 million in angel funding, all but two of the 40 angel investors were physicians.

== VitalSigns ==
VitalSigns is a Health Policy Resource Center launched by iMedExchange in July 2009. It provides a succinct dashboard of health care policy updates and peer insights on healthcare policy and reform.

The Senator Tom Coburn M.D. Resource Center provides insight and commentary from Senator Coburn's physician advocate - Dr. Jim Rowsey.
