= Insurance Capital Standards Clarification Act of 2014 =

- Long title: To clarify the application of certain leverage and risk-based requirements under the Dodd-Frank Wall Street Reform and Consumer Protection Act.
- Announced in: the 113th United States Congress
- Sponsored by: Sen. Tom Coburn (R, OK)
- Number of co-sponsors: 4

Citations
- Public law: 113-279

Codification
- U.S.C. sections affected: 12 U.S.C. § 5371
- Agencies affected: Federal Reserve Board of Governors

Legislative history
- Introduced in the Senate as S. 2270 by Susan Collins (R–ME) on April 29, 2014; Committee consideration by United States Senate Committee on Banking, Housing, and Urban Affairs; Passed the Senate on June 3, 2014 (unanimous consent); Passed the House on December 10, 2014 (unanimous consent); Signed into law by President Barack Obama on December 18, 2014

The Insurance Capital Standards Clarification Act of 2014 (S. 2270) is a United States bill that would amend the Dodd–Frank Wall Street Reform and Consumer Protection Act to "clarify the application of certain leverage and risk-based requirements".

The bill was passed during the 113th United States Congress and signed into law on December 18, 2014.

== Background ==
The bill was written in response to some claims by Federal reserve Board lawyers that the way the law is current written, they are required to apply rules about bank capital standards to insurance companies.

A companion measure H.R. 4510 was introduced in the United States House of Representatives.

== Provisions of the bill ==
The bill would give states more control over the "business insurance of foreign companies doing business within the United States."

The bill would revise section 171 of the Dodd–Frank Wall Street Reform and Consumer Protection Act, a section which is sometimes called the "Collins Amendment". The bill would "clarify that the Federal Reserve Board can apply insurance-based capital standards to the insurance portion of any insurance holding company it oversees." The change would mean that bank capital rules would be applied only to the banking portions of a business, with separate insurance capital rules being applied to insurance-related portions.

== Procedural history ==
The Insurance Capital Standards Clarification Act of 2014 was introduced into the United States Senate on April 29, 2014 by Sen. Tom Coburn (R, OK). It was referred to the United States Senate Committee on Banking, Housing, and Urban Affairs. On June 3, 2014, the Senate voted with unanimous consent to pass the bill. The House passed the bill also by unanimous consent on December 10, 2014. It was signed by the President and became Public Law No: 113-279 on December 18, 2014.

== Debate and discussion ==
The Hill called the bill "bipartisan".

Organizations that could be affected by this change include the American International Group, Prudential Financial, MetLife, State Farm, and USAA.

The American Council of Life Insurers (ACLI) strongly supported the bill, purchasing advertisements in Roll Call and Politico to announce their support. The organization stated that "there is broad agreement on this position... The Obama administration, Democrats and Republicans in the House and the Senate, state and federal regulators and private industry all agree that life insurers should not be subject to capital standards more suited for the business of banking."

According to Mark A. Hofmann, the bill was an example of "common sense" because "no one, including Fed officials, has taken to the streets demanding that the Fed take over insurance regulation."

== See also ==
- List of bills in the 113th United States Congress
