= 2010 United States Senate election in Oklahoma =

- November 2, 2010
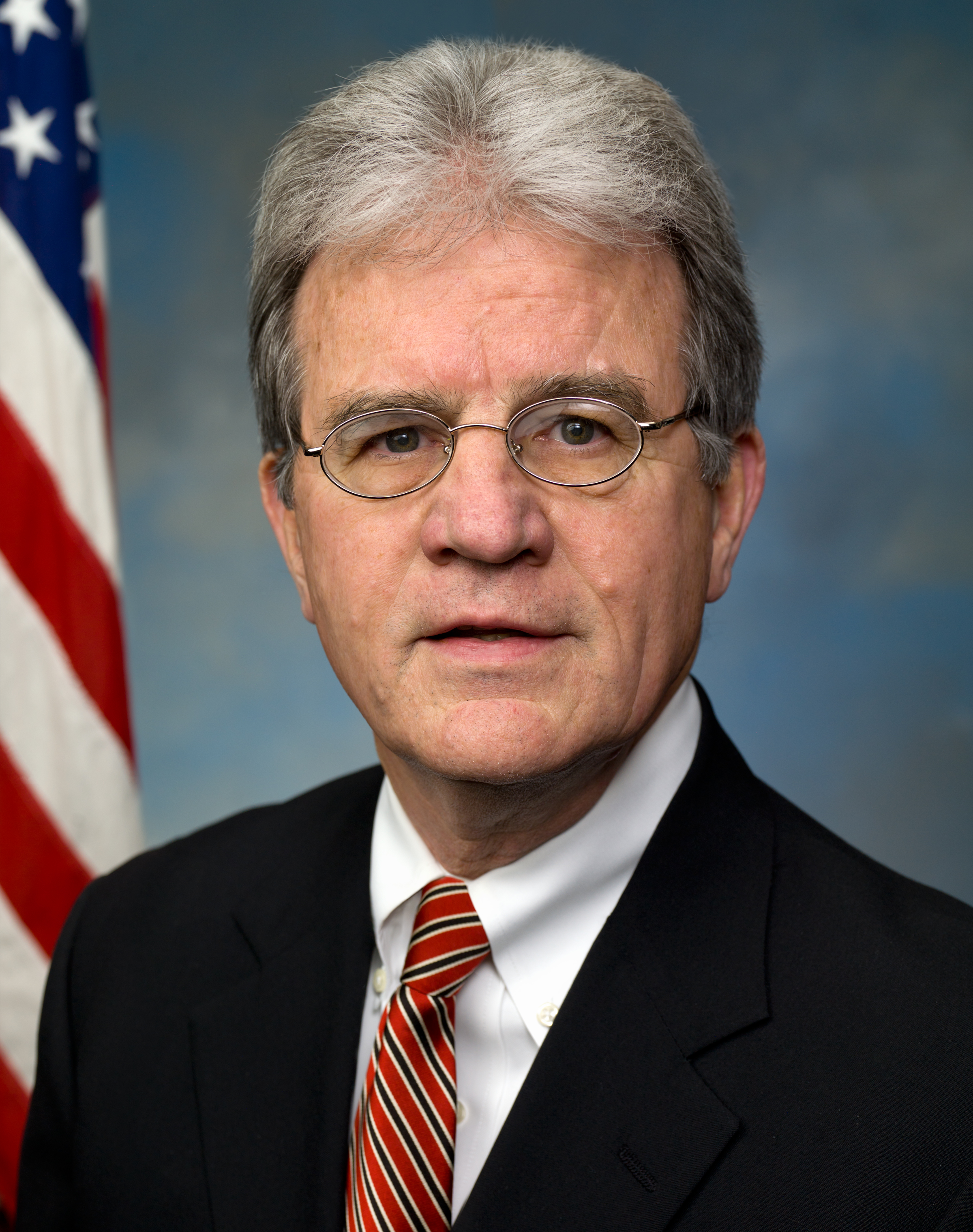

Nominee	Tom Coburn	Jim Rogers
Party	Republican	Democratic
Popular vote	718,482	265,814
Percentage	70.64%	26.13%
- County results Coburn: 60–70% 70–80% 80–90%
U.S. senator before election
Tom Coburn
Republican
Elected U.S. Senator
Tom Coburn
Republican

The 2010 United States Senate election in Oklahoma was held on November 2, 2010. Incumbent Republican Senator Tom Coburn won re-election to a second term with more than 70% of votes statewide, and in each county with more than 60%.

== Republican primary ==
=== Candidates ===
- Tom Coburn, incumbent U.S. senator
- Evelyn Rogers, librarian
- Lewis Kelly Spring, teacher

=== Results ===
Republican primary results
Party	Candidate	Votes	%
Republican	Tom Coburn (incumbent)	223,997	90.4%
Republican	Evelyn Rogers	15,093	6.1%
Republican	Lewis Kelly Spring	8,812	3.5%
Total votes		247,902	100.00%

== Democratic primary ==
=== Candidates ===
- Mark Myles, businessman
- Jim Rogers, retired college professor

=== Results ===
Democratic primary results
Party	Candidate	Votes	%
Democratic	Jim Rogers	157,955	65.4%
Democratic	Mark Myles	83,715	34.6%
Total votes		241,670	100.0%

== General election ==
=== Candidates ===
- Tom Coburn (R), incumbent U.S. senator
- Ronald Dwyer (I), activist
- Jim Rogers (D), teacher
- Stephen Wallace (I), businessman

=== Campaign ===
Coburn, a very popular incumbent, promised to self-term limit himself to two terms. Despite his popularity, he did release television advertisements. In 2009, Coburn's approval rating in a PPP poll was 59%, including a 39% approval rating among Democrats. His Democratic opponent was a perennial candidate who did little campaigning.

=== Predictions ===
Source	Ranking	As of
Cook Political Report	Solid R	October 26, 2010
Rothenberg	Safe R	October 22, 2010
RealClearPolitics	Safe R	October 26, 2010
Sabato's Crystal Ball	Safe R	October 21, 2010
CQ Politics	Safe R	October 26, 2010

=== Polling ===
Poll source	Date(s) administered	Sample size	Margin of error	Tom Coburn (R)	Jim Rogers (D)	Other	Undecided
Rasmussen Reports	June 30, 2010	500	± 4.5%	65%	26%	3%	7%
Rasmussen Reports	July 28, 2010	500	± 4.5%	65%	31%	1%	4%
Rasmussen Reports	August 26, 2010	500	± 4.5%	67%	24%	3%	5%
Rasmussen Reports	September 23, 2010	500	± 4.5%	68%	26%	2%	4%
SoonerPoll	October 3–7, 2010	755	± ?	62%	22%	2%	14%

Hypothetical polling

Poll source	Date(s) administered	Sample size	Margin of error	Tom Coburn (R)	Dan Boren (D)	Other	Undecided
Public Policy Polling	May 13–17, 2009	715	± 3.7%	53%	36%	—	11%

Poll source	Date(s) administered	Sample size	Margin of error	Tom Coburn (R)	Brad Henry (D)	Other	Undecided
Public Policy Polling	May 13–17, 2009	715	± 3.7%	52%	40%	—	8%

Poll source	Date(s) administered	Sample size	Margin of error	Tom Coburn (R)	Mark Myles (D)	Other	Undecided
Rasmussen Reports	June 30, 2010	500	± 4.5%	62%	27%	4%	6%

Poll source	Date(s) administered	Sample size	Margin of error	Tom Cole (R)	Dan Boren (D)	Other	Undecided
Public Policy Polling	May 13–17, 2009	715	± 3.7%	42%	40%	—	18%

Poll source	Date(s) administered	Sample size	Margin of error	Tom Cole (R)	Brad Henry (D)	Other	Undecided
Public Policy Polling	May 13–17, 2009	715	± 3.7%	44%	43%	—	13%

Poll source	Date(s) administered	Sample size	Margin of error	J. C. Watts (R)	Dan Boren (D)	Other	Undecided
Public Policy Polling	May 13–17, 2009	715	± 3.7%	46%	41%	—	13%

Poll source	Date(s) administered	Sample size	Margin of error	J. C. Watts (R)	Brad Henry (D)	Other	Undecided
Public Policy Polling	May 13–17, 2009	715	± 3.7%	45%	44%	—	11%

=== Fundraising ===
Candidate (party)	Receipts	Disbursements	Cash on hand	Debt
Tom Coburn (R)	$1,935,820	$2,103,749	$671,135	$0
Jim Rogers (D)	$0	$0	$0	$0
Source: Federal Election Commission

=== Results ===
United States Senate election in Oklahoma, 2010
Party	Candidate	Votes	%	±%
Republican	Tom Coburn (incumbent)	718,482	70.64%	+17.87%
Democratic	Jim Rogers	265,814	26.13%	−15.11%
Independent	Stephen Wallace	25,048	2.46%	N/A
Independent	Ronald F. Dwyer	7,807	0.77%	N/A
Majority		452,668	44.50%	
Total votes		1,017,151	100.00%	
Republican hold		Swing		

==== Counties that flipped from Democratic to Republican ====
- Atoka (largest city: Atoka)
- Bryan (largest city: Durant)
- Caddo (largest city: Anadarko)
- Coal (largest city: Coalgate)
- Cotton (largest city: Walters)
- Craig (largest city: Vinita)
- Greer (largest city: Mangum)
- Harmon (largest city: Hollis)
- Jefferson (largest city: Waurika)
- Johnston (largest city: Tishomingo)
- Kiowa (largest city: Hobart)
- Le Flore (largest city: Poteau)
- Love (largest city: Marietta)
- Marshall (largest city: Madill)
- Mayes (largest city: Pryor Creek)
- Murray (largest city: Sulphur)
- Nowata (largest city: Nowata)
- Okfuskee (largest city: Okemah)
- Osage (largest city: Hominy)
- Pittsburg (largest city: McAlester)
- Pushmataha (largest city: Antlers)
- Seminole (largest city: Seminole)
- Sequoyah (largest city: Sallisaw)
- Tillman (largest city: Frederick)
- Cherokee (largest city: Tahlequah)
- Choctaw (largest city: Hugo)
- Haskell (largest city: Stigler)
- Hughes (largest city: Holdenville)
- Latimer (largest city: Wilburton)
- McIntosh (largest city: Checotah)
- Muskogee (largest city: Muskogee)
- Okmulgee (largest city: Okmulgee)
- Ottawa (largest city: Miami)
- Delaware (largest city: Grove)
- Adair (largest city: Stilwell)
