= 1986 United States Senate election in Oklahoma =

- November 3, 1986
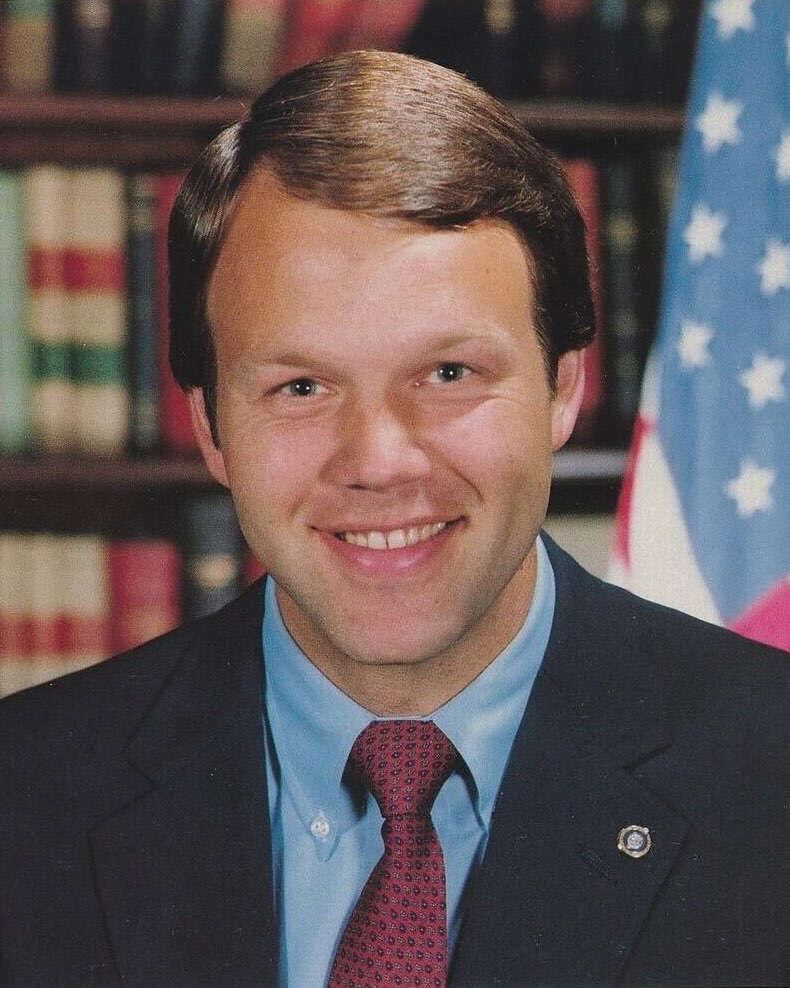

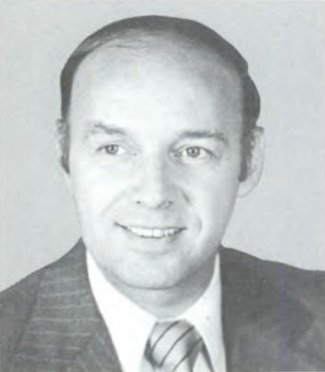
Nominee	Don Nickles	James R. Jones
Party	Republican	Democratic
Popular vote	493,436	400,230
Percentage	55.21%	44.79%
- County results Nickles: 50–60% 60–70% 70–80% Jones: 50–60% 60–70%
U.S. senator before election
Don Nickles
Republican
Elected U.S. Senator
Don Nickles
Republican

The 1986 United States Senate election in Oklahoma was held on November 3, 1986. Incumbent Republican U.S. Senator Don Nickles won re-election to his second term.

== Democratic primary ==
=== Candidates ===
- James R. Jones, Representative for Oklahoma's 1st district

=== Results ===
Democratic primary
Party	Candidate	Votes	%
Democratic	James R. Jones	324,907	67.40
Democratic	George Gentry	157,141	32.60
Total votes		482,048	100

== Results ==
1986 Oklahoma U.S. Senate election
Party	Candidate	Votes	%
Republican	Don Nickles (Incumbent)	493,436	55.21%
Democratic	James R. Jones	400,230	44.79%
Republican hold			

== See also ==
- 1986 United States Senate elections
