= American Council of Life Insurers =

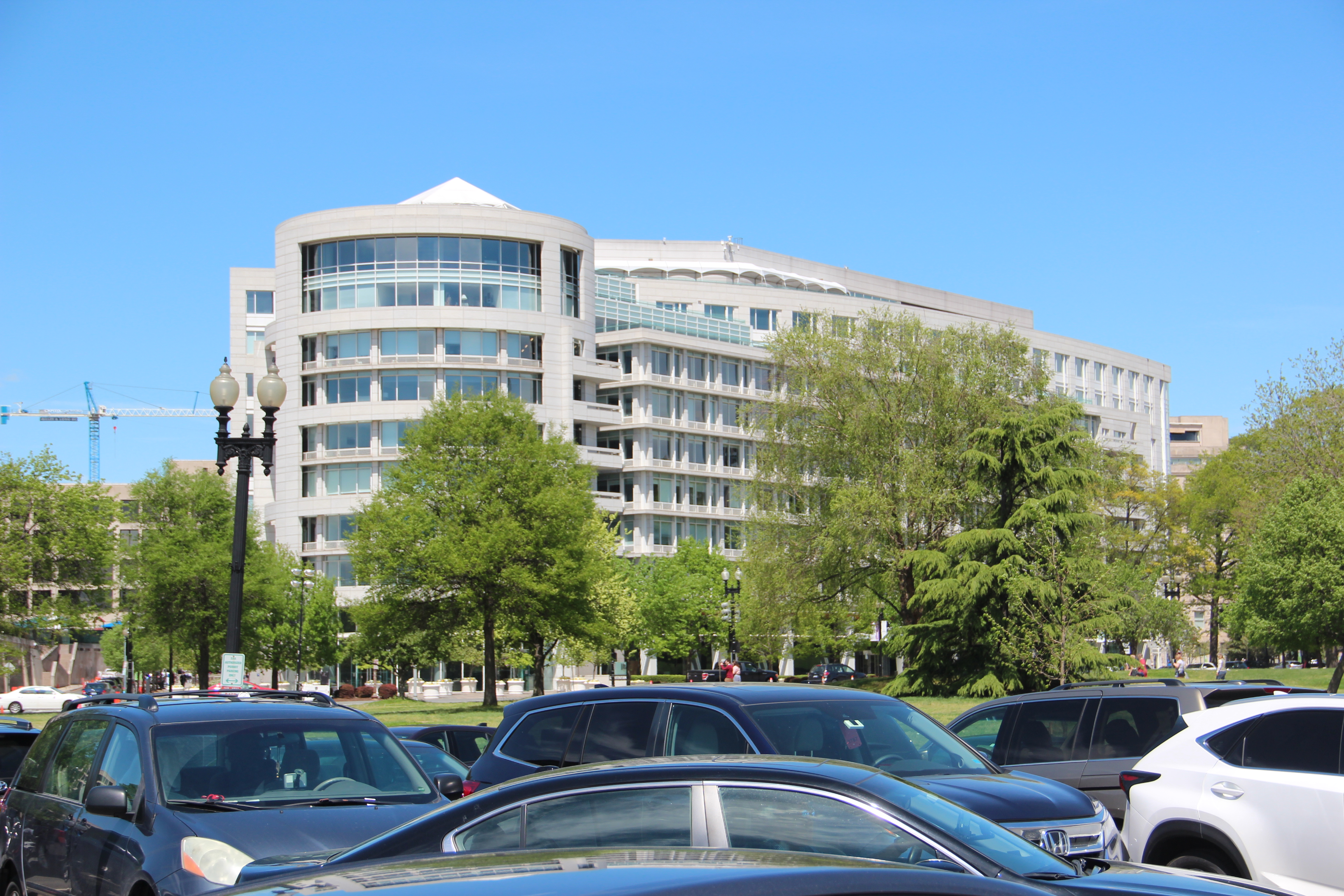
ACLI headquarters on Constitution Avenue

The American Council of Life Insurers (ACLI) is the leading trade association driving public policy and advocacy on behalf of the life insurance industry. Based in Washington, D.C., ACLI advocates on behalf of 275 member companies whose products and services help 90 million American families achieve financial security. Life insurers offer products that protect people through all stages of life, including life insurance, paid leave, retirement savings like 401(k)s, annuities, supplemental benefits and more. ACLI produces an annual Life Insurers Fact Book that provides statistics and information on trends in the life insurance industry.

David Chavern is the organization's president and chief executive officer. He succeeded Susan Neely, who led ACLI from 2018 through 2024. She was preceded by former Governor of Idaho Dirk Kempthorne, who led ACLI from 2010 to 2018. Prior to that, former Oklahoma Governor Frank Keating led ACLI from 2003 to 2011.

== Legislation ==
- Insurance Capital Standards Clarification Act of 2014 (S. 2270; 113th Congress) - ACLI lobbied in favor of this bill, buying advertisements in several Washington, D.C. newspapers. ACLI stated that "there is broad agreement on this position... The Obama administration, Democrats and Republicans in the House and the Senate, state and federal regulators and private industry all agree that life insurers should not be subject to capital standards more suited for the business of banking."
