= American Medical News =

- Type: Weekly newspaper
- Format: Tabloid
- Owner: American Medical Association
- Publisher: American Medical Association
- Founded: September 22, 1958
- Ceased publication: September 9, 2013
- Headquarters: 515 N. State St., Chicago, IL 60654, United States
- Circulation: 213,107 (June 2011)
- ISSN: 1539-5162
- Website: www.amednews.com

American Medical News was an American newspaper that covered business, policy, public health and legal issues affecting physician practices. American Medical News offered 24 print issues each year, and 52 online editions, with fresh news added each weekday. First published by the American Medical Association as The AMA News in 1958, it was renamed in 1969 to reflect its broadened coverage. Most copies were distributed free as an AMA benefit of membership and to some non-member physicians, with internal medicine and family practice accounting for the majority of readers. The paper was intended to serve as an impartial and credible forum for information affecting physicians and their practices.

The newspaper was shut down in 2013.
