= Don Nickles =

American politician (born 1948)

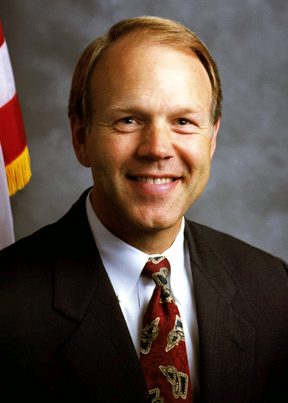

United States Senator from Oklahoma
- In office January 3, 1981 – January 3, 2005
- Preceded by: Henry Bellmon
- Succeeded by: Tom Coburn
Senate positions
Chair of the Senate Budget Committee
In office January 3, 2003 – January 3, 2005
Preceded by	Kent Conrad
Succeeded by	Judd Gregg
Senate Minority Whip
In office June 6, 2001 – January 3, 2003
Leader	Trent Lott
Preceded by	Harry Reid
Succeeded by	Harry Reid
In office January 3, 2001 – January 20, 2001
Leader	Trent Lott
Preceded by	Harry Reid
Succeeded by	Harry Reid
Senate Majority Whip
In office January 20, 2001 – June 6, 2001
Leader	Trent Lott
Preceded by	Harry Reid
Succeeded by	Harry Reid
In office June 12, 1996 – January 3, 2001
Leader	Trent Lott
Preceded by	Trent Lott
Succeeded by	Harry Reid
Chair of the Senate Republican Policy Committee
In office January 3, 1991 – June 12, 1996
Leader	Bob Dole
Preceded by	William L. Armstrong
Succeeded by	Larry Craig

Member of the Oklahoma Senate from the 20th district
- In office January 2, 1979 – January 3, 1981
- Preceded by: Roy Grantham
- Succeeded by: William O'Connor

Personal details
- Born: Donald Lee Nickles; December 6, 1948 (age 77) Ponca City, Oklahoma, U.S.
- Party: Republican
- Spouse: Linda Lou Morrison (m. 1968; died 2022)
- Children: 4
- Education: Oklahoma State University, Stillwater (BA)
- Nickles's voice Nickles honoring deceased Sen. John Chafee. Recorded October 25, 1999

Donald Lee Nickles (born December 6, 1948) is an American politician and lobbyist who was a Republican United States senator from Oklahoma from 1981 to 2005. He was considered both a fiscal and social conservative. After retiring from the Senate as the longest-serving senator from Oklahoma up until that point, he founded the Nickles Group, a lobbying firm.

== Early life ==
Nickles was born and raised in Ponca City, Oklahoma, the son of Coeweene (Bryan) and Robert C. Nickles. He attended Ponca City public schools graduating from Ponca City High School in 1967. To help pay for their education at Oklahoma State University, he and his wife, the former Linda Lou Morrison, operated Don Nickles Professional Cleaning Service in Stillwater. He was a member of Beta Theta Pi fraternity at Oklahoma State University, and earned a Bachelor of Arts in business administration in 1971.

After college, he went to work for Nickles Machine Corporation in Ponca City, a business started in 1918 by his grandfather, Clair Nickles. He became the company's vice president and general manager. He also served in the Kansas Army National Guard and the Oklahoma Army National Guard from 1970 until 1976. A formative experience was the distress his family suffered following the death of his father, Robert, in 1961, when Nickles was twelve years old. The family had to sell off part of the family business to raise cash to pay the required estate tax.

In 1978, aged 29, his election to the Oklahoma Senate was the beginning of his career in public office. Two years later, at the age of 31, he became and remains the youngest Republican ever elected to the U.S. Senate.

== U.S. Senate ==
=== Tenure ===
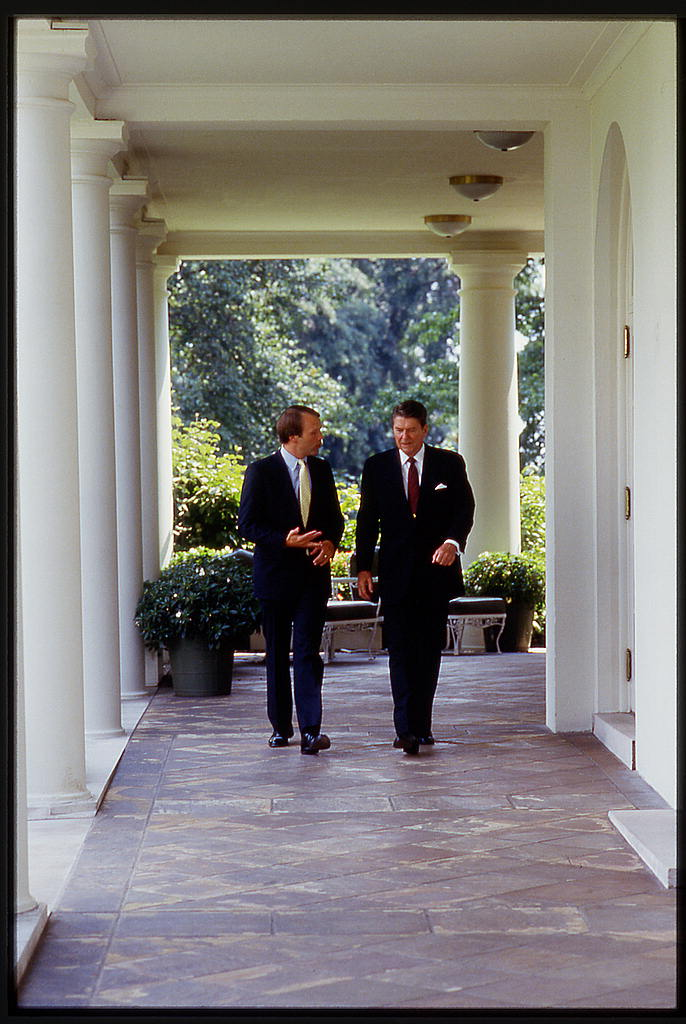
Nickles with President Ronald Reagan in 1986

He sponsored legislation to cut taxes, reduce government spending, promote national defense, and reduce what he believed to be official hostility to religion. He sponsored the Defense of Marriage Act, which allowed states to refuse to recognize same-sex marriages conducted in other states.

As Republican Whip, Nickles called for the resignation of fellow Republican Trent Lott as majority leader after Lott made remarks praising Strom Thurmond that seemed insensitive to the issue of racial segregation. The National Federation of Independent Business praised Nickles for including in the Senate's 2005 budget a provision that would accelerate by one year a complete repeal of the federal estate tax. Nickles was one of many Republican senators who in 1981 called the White House to express his discontent over the nomination of Sandra Day O'Connor of Arizona to the United States Supreme Court. Nickles said that he and other socially conservative Republican senators would not support O'Connor because of her "presumed unwillingness" to overturn the abortion decision Roe v. Wade.

During a 1986 campaign rally at the University of Oklahoma in Norman, President Ronald Reagan accidentally called him Don Rickles, the American comedian. The president was later told about his mistake and found it very amusing.

Nickles was one of three Senators to vote against the confirmation of Ruth Bader Ginsburg and one of nine to vote against the confirmation of Stephen Breyer to the U.S. Supreme Court.

=== Leadership ===
Nickles quickly rose in the Senate Republican leadership, serving as chairman of the National Republican Senatorial Committee in the 101st Congress; Chairman of the Republican Policy Committee in the 102nd, 103rd, and 104th Congresses; and Assistant Republican Leader from 1996 to 2003. After being term-limited out of the Assistant Leader position, Nickles served in the 108th Congress as chairman of the Senate Budget Committee. Nickles was also on Bob Dole's short list of vice presidential choices, before Dole finally decided on former Congressman Jack Kemp of New York.

In December 2002, Nickles became embroiled in the controversy surrounding Republican Leader Trent Lott. At Senator Strom Thurmond's 100th birthday party, Lott had made comments that some took to be racially insensitive. As the controversy grew, Nickles went on national television and became the first senator in the Republican leadership to say that Lott should step down. Nickles believed that the controversy over Lott's remarks would distract from the Republican legislative agenda, and as he served as Lott's deputy in the Senate this statement was seen as the proverbial "straw that broke the camel's back." Despite many apologies for his remarks, Lott stepped down shortly thereafter. Nickles declined to run for the position of Senate Majority Leader himself, and Lott was succeeded by Bill Frist of Tennessee.

Nickles was re-elected in 1986, 1992 and 1998 and was the senior senator from Oklahoma from 1994 to 2005.

== Post-Senate career ==
On October 7, 2003, he announced that he would not run in the 2004 election. Republican Tom Coburn was elected to succeed Nickles.

Nickles went on to found the Nickles Group, a government consulting group in Washington, D.C. He also serves on the boards of directors of a number of public companies, such as Oklahoma City-based Chesapeake Energy.

Nickles was one of the politicians featured in the film Traffic, giving his opinion on the war on drugs.

== Family ==
Nickles and his wife, Linda, have four children.

== See also ==
- HIV Prevention Act of 1997

== Other sources ==
- "Nickles, McCaleb Try to Sabotage Oklahoma Amtrak Service, Opt for Yugo Rather Than Cadillac." Oklahoma State Senate. Communications Division, State Capitol. May 24, 1999.
- Biographical Directory of the American Congress, 1774–1996. Alexandria, Va.: CQ Staff Directories, 1997.
- "Donald Nickles." Research Division, Oklahoma Historical Society, Oklahoma City, Okla.
- Biographical Directory of the United States Congress, 1774–1989. Washington, D.C.: U.S. Government Printing Office, 1989.
- Congressional Directory, 106th Congress, 1999–2000. Washington, D.C.: U.S. Government Printing Office, 1999.
- Congressional Quarterly's Politics in America 2000, The 106th Congress. Philip D. Duncan and Brian Nutting, eds. Washington, D.C.: Congressional Quarterly, Inc., 1999.
- Who's Who in American Politics, 1997–1998. Marquis Who's Who, 1997.

Party political offices
Preceded by Henry Bellmon	Republican nominee for U.S. Senator from Oklahoma (Class 3); 1980, 1986, 1992, 1998	Succeeded by Tom Coburn
Preceded by Rudy Boschwitz	Chair of the National Republican Senatorial Committee; 1989–1991	Succeeded by Phil Gramm
Preceded by William L. Armstrong	Chair of the Senate Republican Policy Committee; 1991–1996	Succeeded by Larry Craig
Preceded by Trent Lott	Senate Republican Whip; 1996–2003	Succeeded by Mitch McConnell
U.S. Senate
Preceded by Henry Bellmon	U.S. Senator (Class 3) from Oklahoma; 1981–2005; Served alongside: David Boren, Jim Inhofe	Succeeded by Tom Coburn
Preceded by Trent Lott	Senate Majority Whip; 1996–2001	Succeeded by Harry Reid
Preceded by Harry Reid	Senate Minority Whip; 2001–2003	Succeeded by Harry Reid
Preceded by Kent Conrad	Chair of the Senate Budget Committee; 2003–2005	Succeeded by Judd Gregg
Honorary titles
Preceded by Bill Bradley	Baby of the Senate; 1981–1987	Succeeded by David Karnes
Preceded by David Karnes	Baby of the Senate; 1989–1993	Succeeded by Russ Feingold
U.S. order of precedence (ceremonial)
Preceded by Bill Frist as former U.S. Senate Majority Leader	Order of precedence of the United States as former U.S. Senate Majority Whip	Succeeded by Richard Shelby as former U.S. Senator
