= Partner notification =

Notifying sexual partners of a person diagnosed with an STD

Partner notification is the practice of notifying the sexual partners of a person, known as the "index case", who has been newly diagnosed with a sexually transmitted infection that they may have been exposed to the infection. It is a kind of contact tracing and is considered a partner service.

== Practice ==
In the UK, partner notification has not played a significant part in HIV prevention and testing efforts despite proving to be highly effective in diagnosing people with HIV. Some audits show up to 37% of partners traced and tested through partner notification were newly diagnosed HIV positive as a result. Notifying sexual partners of people diagnosed with HIV is usually voluntary but a healthcare worker may decide to contact partners without consent if they feel there is a risk of HIV transmission. This is permitted under General Medical Council guidance.

A 2002 survey in the United States showed that with regards to STIs, healthcare providers conduct screenings with less frequency than recommended by health department guidelines. Furthermore, when a person was found to have a sexually transmitted infection, it was much more common for the physician to ask the person to notify their partners rather than for the physician to arrange for this to be done on behalf of the patient.

A study in San Francisco conducted between 2004 and 2006 showed that many new diagnoses of HIV infection were made as a result of one person getting HIV tested, and then contacting that person's partner if the test was positive. It was sometimes the case that a positive person also had a positive partner. Patients rarely refused partner services, and their partners rarely refused to present themselves for healthcare when asked by the clinic.

== Involuntary partner notification ==
In the past, the CDC has recommended that physicians and health departments should inform the sexual partners of people known to be infected with HIV of their risk for contracting the disease when the diagnosed individual refused to do so. However, the CDC currently recommends that all partner services, including partner notification, should be "voluntary and non-coercive" for both the individual initially diagnosed with the STD and their sexual partners. Despite the change, as of 1998, several states in the US have laws that codify involuntary or coercive partner notification. In Michigan and Indiana, individuals who test positive for HIV are legally obligated to notify past sexual contacts. In Texas and other states, doctors and public health officials are either required or authorized to inform known sexual contacts of patients who have tested positive for HIV.

In New South Wales, Australia, if a health worker believes that the behavior of the index case poses a risk to the health of the public, then the worker is obligated to inform the Director-General of NSW health, who has the sole authority to inform partners of the index case without their consent.
