= Tom Coburn =

American politician and physician (1948–2020)

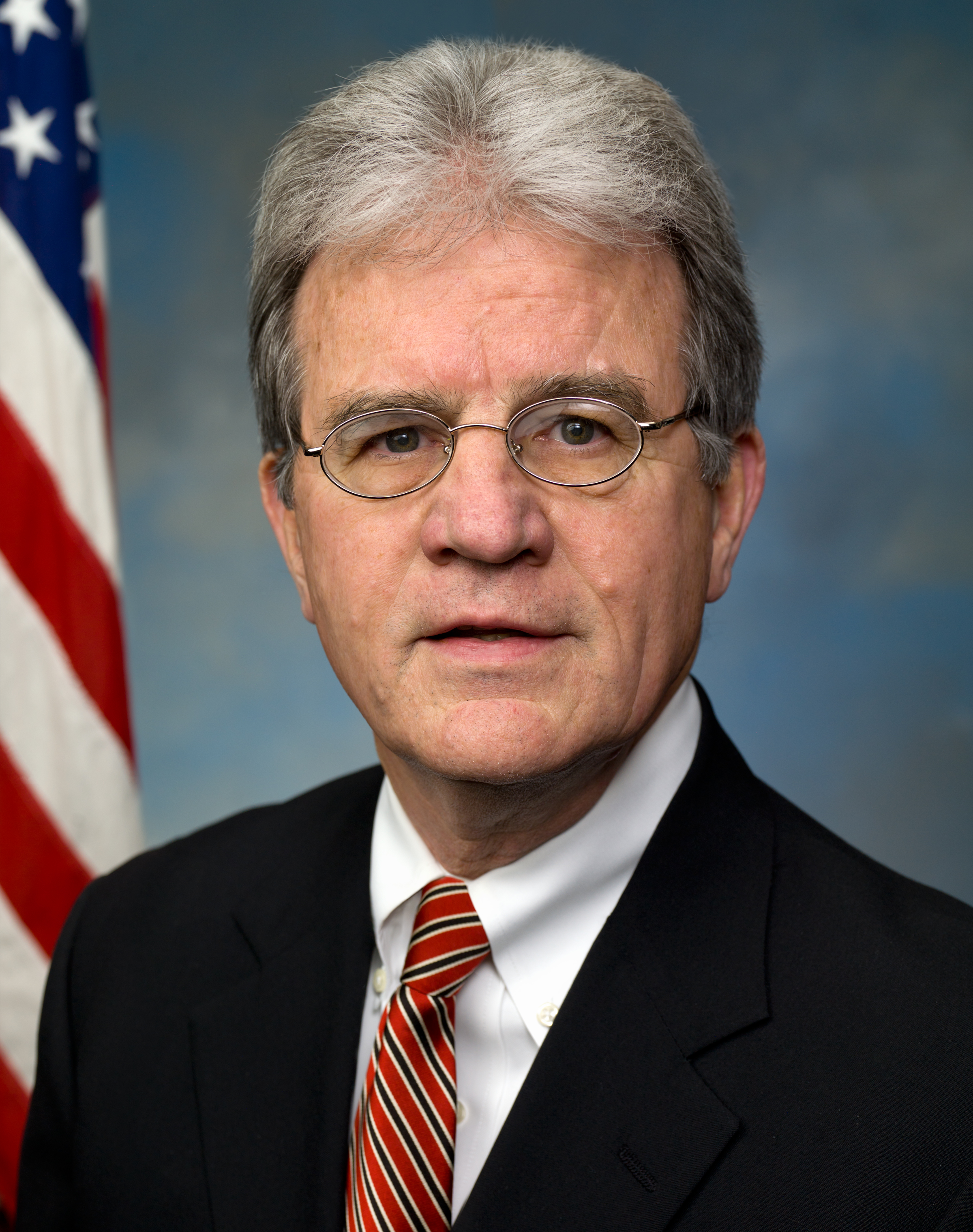
- Official portrait, 2011

Ranking Member of the Senate Homeland Security Committee
- In office January 3, 2013 – January 3, 2015
- Preceded by: Susan Collins
- Succeeded by: Tom Carper

United States Senator from Oklahoma
- In office January 3, 2005 – January 3, 2015
- Preceded by: Don Nickles
- Succeeded by: James Lankford

Member of the U.S. House of Representatives from Oklahoma's 2nd district
- In office January 3, 1995 – January 3, 2001
- Preceded by: Mike Synar
- Succeeded by: Brad Carson

Personal details
- Born: Thomas Allen Coburn; March 14, 1948 Casper, Wyoming, U.S.
- Died: March 28, 2020 (aged 72) Tulsa, Oklahoma, U.S.
- Party: Republican
- Spouse: Carolyn Denton (m. 1968)
- Children: 3, including Sarah
- Education: Oklahoma State University (BS); University of Oklahoma (MD)
- Nickname: "Dr. No"
- Tom Coburn's voice Coburn speaks to Elena Kagan at her Supreme Court confirmation hearing Recorded June 28, 2010

Thomas Allen Coburn (March 14, 1948 – March 28, 2020) was an American politician and physician who served as a United States senator from Oklahoma from 2005 to 2015. A Republican, Coburn previously served as a United States representative from 1995 to 2001.

Coburn was an obstetrician who operated a private medical practice in Muskogee, Oklahoma. He was elected to the United States House of Representatives in 1994 as part of the Republican Revolution. After being re-elected twice, Coburn upheld his campaign pledge to serve no more than three consecutive terms and did not seek re-election in 2000. In 2004, he returned to political life with a successful run for the United States Senate. Coburn was re-elected to a second Senate term in 2010 and kept his pledge not to seek a third term in 2016. In January 2014, Coburn announced that he would resign before the expiration of his final term due to a recurrence of prostate cancer. He submitted a letter of resignation to Oklahoma Governor Mary Fallin, effective at the end of the 113th Congress.

Coburn was a fiscal and social conservative known for his opposition to deficit spending, pork barrel projects, and abortion. Described as "the godfather of the modern conservative austerity movement", he supported term limits, gun rights and the death penalty, and opposed same-sex marriage and embryonic stem cell research. Many Democrats referred to him as "Dr. No" due to his frequent use of technicalities to block federal spending bills.

After leaving Congress, Coburn worked with the Manhattan Institute for Policy Research on its efforts to reform the Food and Drug Administration, becoming a senior fellow of the institute in December 2016. Coburn also served as a senior advisor to Citizens for Self-Governance, where he was active in calling for a convention to propose amendments to the United States Constitution.

== Early life, education, and medical career ==
Coburn was born in Casper, Wyoming, the son of Anita Joy (née Allen) and Orin Wesley Coburn. Coburn's father was an optician and founder of Coburn Optical Industries, and a named donor to O. W. Coburn School of Law at Oral Roberts University.

Coburn graduated with a Bachelor of Science in accounting from Oklahoma State University, where he was also a member of Sigma Nu fraternity. In 1968, he married Carolyn Denton, the 1967 Miss Oklahoma; their three daughters are Callie, Katie and Sarah, a leading operatic soprano. One of the top ten seniors in the School of Business, Coburn served as president of the College of Business Student Council.

From 1970 to 1978, Coburn served as a manufacturing manager at the Ophthalmic Division of Coburn Optical Industries in Colonial Heights, Virginia. While Coburn was manager, the Virginia division of Coburn Optical grew from 13 employees to over 350 and captured 35 percent of the U.S. market.

After recovering from an occurrence of malignant melanoma, Coburn pursued a medical degree and graduated from the University of Oklahoma Medical School with honors in 1983. He then opened Maternal & Family Practice in Muskogee, Oklahoma, and served as a deacon in a Southern Baptist Church. During his career in obstetrics, he treated over 15,000 patients, delivered 4,000 babies and was subject to one malpractice lawsuit, which was dismissed without finding Coburn at fault. Together Coburn and his wife were members of First Baptist Church of Muskogee.

=== Sterilization controversy ===
A sterilization Coburn performed on a 20-year-old woman, Angela Plummer, in 1990, became what was called "the most incendiary issue" of his Senate campaign. Coburn performed the sterilization on the woman during an emergency surgery to treat a life-threatening ectopic pregnancy, removing her healthy intact fallopian tube as well as the one damaged by the surgery. The woman sued Coburn, alleging that he did not have consent to sterilize her, while Coburn claimed he had her oral consent. The lawsuit was ultimately dismissed with no finding of liability on Coburn's part.

The state attorney general claimed that Coburn committed Medicaid fraud by not reporting the sterilization when he filed a claim for the emergency surgery. Medicaid did not reimburse doctors for sterilization procedures for patients under 21 and according to the attorney general, Coburn would not have been reimbursed at all had he disclosed this information. Coburn says since he did not file a claim for the sterilization, no fraud was committed. No charges were filed against Coburn for this claim.

== Political career ==
=== House career ===
In 1994, Coburn ran for the House of Representatives in Oklahoma's 2nd congressional district, which was based in Muskogee and included 22 counties in northeastern Oklahoma. Coburn initially expected to face eight-term incumbent Mike Synar. However, Synar was defeated in a runoff for the Democratic nomination by a 71-year-old retired principal, Virgil Cooper. According to Coburn's 2003 book, Breach of Trust: How Washington Turns Outsiders Into Insiders, Coburn and Cooper got along well, since both were opposed to the more liberal Synar. The general election was cordial since both men knew that Synar would not return to Washington regardless of the outcome. Coburn won by a 52%–48% margin, becoming the first Republican to represent the district since 1921.

Coburn was one of the most conservative members of the House. He supported "reducing the size of the federal budget", wanted to make abortion illegal and supported the proposed television V-chip legislation.

Despite representing a heavily Democratic district and President Bill Clinton's electoral dominance therein, Coburn was reelected in 1996 and 1998.

In the House, Coburn earned a reputation as a political maverick due to his frequent battles with House Speaker Newt Gingrich. Most of these stand-offs stemmed from his belief that the Republican caucus was moving toward the political center and away from the more conservative Contract With America policy proposals that had brought the Republicans into power in Congress in 1994 for the first time in 40 years.

External videos
- Booknotes interview with Coburn on Breach of Trust: How Washington Turns Outsiders Into Insiders, November 23, 2003, C-SPAN

Coburn endorsed conservative activist and former diplomat Alan Keyes in the 2000 Republican presidential primaries. Coburn retired from Congress in 2001, fulfilling his pledge to serve no more than three terms in the House. His congressional district returned to the Democratic fold, as attorney Brad Carson defeated Andy Ewing, a Republican endorsed by Coburn. After leaving the House and returning to private medical practice, Coburn wrote Breach of Trust, with ghostwriter John Hart, about his experiences in Congress. The book detailed Coburn's perspective on the internal Republican Party debates over the Contract With America and displayed his disdain for career politicians. Some of the figures he criticized (such as Gingrich) were already out of office at the time of the book's publishing, but others (such as former House Speaker Dennis Hastert) remained influential in Congress, which resulted in speculation that some congressional Republicans wanted no part of Coburn's return to politics.

During his tenure in the House, Coburn wrote and passed far-reaching pieces of legislation. These include laws to expand seniors' health care options, to protect access to home health care in rural areas and to allow Americans to access cheaper medications from Canada and other nations. Coburn also wrote a law intended to prevent the spread of AIDS to infants. The Wall Street Journal said about the law, "In 10 long years of AIDS politics and funding, this is actually the first legislation to pass in this country that will rescue babies." He also wrote a law to renew and reform federal AIDS care programs. In 2002, President George W. Bush chose Coburn to serve as co-chair of the Presidential Advisory Council on HIV/AIDS (PACHA).

During his three terms in the House, Coburn also played an influential role in reforming welfare and other federal entitlement programs.

==== Schindler's List TV broadcast ====
As a congressman in 1997, Coburn protested NBC's plan to air the R-rated Academy Award-winning Holocaust drama Schindler's List during prime time. Coburn stated that, in airing the movie without editing it for television, TV had been taken "to an all-time low, with full-frontal nudity, violence and profanity". He also said the TV broadcast should outrage parents and decent-minded individuals everywhere. Coburn described the airing of Schindler's List on television as "irresponsible sexual behavior. I cringe when I realize that there were children all across this nation watching this program."

This statement met with strong criticism, as the film deals mainly with the Holocaust. After heavy criticism, Coburn apologized "to all those I have offended" and clarified that he agreed with the movie being aired on television, but stated that it should have been on later in the evening. In apologizing, Coburn said that at that time of the evening there are still large numbers of children watching without parental supervision and stated that he stood by his message of protecting children from violence, but had expressed it poorly. He also said, "My intentions were good, but I've obviously made an error in judgment in how I've gone about saying what I wanted to say."

He later wrote in Breach of Trust that he considered this one of the biggest mistakes in his life and that, while he still felt the material was unsuitable for a 7 p.m. television broadcast, he handled the situation poorly.

=== Senate career ===
After three years out of politics, Coburn announced his candidacy for the Senate seat being vacated by four-term incumbent Republican Don Nickles. Former Oklahoma City Mayor Kirk Humphreys (the favorite of the state and national Republican establishment) and Corporation Commissioner Bob Anthony joined the field before Coburn. However, Coburn won the primary by an unexpectedly large margin, taking 61% of the vote to Humphreys's 25%. In the general election, he faced Brad Carson, the Democrat who had succeeded him in the 2nd District and was giving up his seat after only two terms.

In the election, Coburn won by a margin of 53% to Carson's 42%. While Carson routed Coburn in the generally heavily Democratic 2nd District, Coburn swamped Carson in the Oklahoma City metropolitan area and the closer-in Tulsa suburbs. Coburn won the state's two largest counties, Tulsa and Oklahoma, by a combined 86,000 votes, more than half of his overall margin of 166,000 votes cast.

Coburn's Senate voting record was as conservative as his House record.

Coburn was re-elected in 2010. He received 90% of the vote in the Republican primary and 70% in the general election. While he already planned on not seeking a third term in the Senate due to his self-imposed two-term term limit, on January 16, 2014, Coburn announced he would resign his office before his term ended at the end of the year due to his declining health.

On April 29, 2014, Coburn introduced the Insurance Capital Standards Clarification Act of 2014 (S. 2270; 113th Congress) into the Senate and it passed on June 3, 2014.

==== Use of Senate hold ====
Coburn used the Senate hold privilege to prevent several bills from coming to the Senate floor. Coburn earned a reputation for his use of this procedural mechanism. In November 2009 Coburn drew attention for placing a hold on a veterans benefits bill known as the Veterans' Caregiver and Omnibus Health Benefits Act. Coburn also placed a hold on a bill intended to help end hostilities in Uganda by the Lord's Resistance Army.

On May 23, 2007, Coburn blocked two bills honoring the 100th birthday of Rachel Carson. Coburn called Carson's scientific work "junk science", proclaiming that Carson's landmark book Silent Spring was "the catalyst in the deadly worldwide stigmatization against insecticides, especially DDT". Democratic Senator Benjamin L. Cardin of Maryland had intended to submit a resolution celebrating Carson for her "legacy of scientific rigor coupled with poetic sensibility", but Coburn blocked it, saying that "the junk science and stigma surrounding DDT—the cheapest and most effective insecticide on the planet—have finally been jettisoned".

In response to Coburn's holds, Senate Majority Leader Harry Reid introduced the Advancing America's Priorities Act, S. 3297, in July 2008. S. 3297 combined thirty-five bills which Coburn had blocked into what Democrats called the "Tomnibus" bill. The bill included health care provisions, new penalties for child pornography, and several natural resources bills. The bill failed a cloture vote.

Coburn opposed parts of the legislation creating the Lewis and Clark Mount Hood Wilderness Area, which would add protections to wildlands in Oregon, Washington, and Idaho. Coburn exercised a hold on the legislation in both March and November 2008, and decried the required $10 million for surveying and mapping as wasteful. The Mount Hood bill would have been the largest amount of land added to federal protection since 1984.

In March 2009, those wilderness areas became protected under the Omnibus Public Land Management Act, which passed the Senate 73–21.

According to the Boston Globe, Coburn initially blocked passage of the Genetic Information Nondiscrimination Act (GINA), objecting to provisions in the bill that allow discrimination based on genetic information from embryos and fetuses. After the embryo loophole was closed, Coburn lifted his hold on the bill.

Coburn had initially blocked passage of the LRA Disarmament and Northern Uganda Recovery Act, which would help to disarm the Lord's Resistance Army, a political group accused of human rights abuses. On March 9, 2010, Coburn lifted his hold on the LRA bill freeing it to move to the Senate floor after reaching a compromise regarding the funding of the bill, and an eleven-day protest outside of his office.

==== John Ensign scandal ====
Coburn was affiliated with a religious organization called The Family. Coburn previously lived in one of the Family's Washington, D.C. dormitories with then-Senator John Ensign, another Family member and longtime resident of the C Street Center who admitted he had an extramarital affair with a staffer in 2009. The announcement by Ensign of his infidelity brought public scrutiny of the Family and its connection to other high-ranking politicians, including Coburn.

Coburn, together with senior members of the Family, attempted to intervene to end Ensign's affair in February 2008, before the affair became public, including by meeting with the husband of Ensign's mistress and encouraging Ensign to write a letter to his mistress breaking off the affair. Ensign was driven to a branch of FedEx from the C Street Center to post the letter, shortly after which Ensign called to tell his mistress to ignore it.

Coburn refused to speak about his involvement in Ensign's affair or his knowledge of the affair well before it became public, asserting legal privilege due to his statuses as a licensed physician in Oklahoma and a deacon.

In October 2009, Coburn made a statement to The New York Times about Ensign's affair and cover-up: "John got trapped doing something really stupid and then made a lot of other mistakes afterward. Judgment gets impaired by arrogance and that's what's going on here."

In May 2011, the Senate Ethics Committee identified Coburn in their report on the ethics violations of Ensign. The report stated that Coburn knew about Ensign's extramarital affair and was involved in trying to negotiate a financial settlement to cover it up.

==== Whistleblower rights ====
Coburn was involved in the Bush Administration's struggle with Congress over whistleblower rights. In the case of Garcetti v. Ceballos, the U.S. Supreme Court ruled that government employees who testify against their employers did not have protection from retaliation by their employers under the First Amendment of the Constitution. The free speech protections of the First Amendment have long been used to shield whistleblowers from retaliation.

In response to the Supreme Court decision, the House passed H.R. 985, the Whistleblower Protection Act of 2007. Bush, citing national security concerns, promised to veto the bill should it be passed by Congress. The Senate's version of the Whistleblower Protection Act (S. 274) was approved by the Senate Committee on Homeland Security and Governmental Affairs on June 13, 2007. However, that version failed to reach a vote by the Senate, as Coburn placed a hold on the bill; effectively preventing the passage of the bill, which had bipartisan support in the Senate.

Coburn's website features a news item about United Nations whistleblower Mathieu Credo Koumoin, a former employee for the U.N. Development Program in West Africa, who has asked U.N. ethics chief Robert Benson for protection under the U.N.'s whistleblower protection rules. The site has a link to the "United Nations Watch" of the Republican Office of the Senate Committee on Homeland Security and Governmental Affairs' Subcommittee on Federal Financial Management, Government Information and International Security, of which he was the ranking minority member. Coburn's website also features a tip line for potential whistleblowers on government waste and fraud.

==== Council on American–Islamic Relations ====
Coburn joined Congressmen Sue Myrick (R-NC), Trent Franks (R-AZ), John Shadegg (R-AZ), Paul Broun (R-GA) and Patrick McHenry (R-NC) in a letter to IRS Commissioner Douglas H. Shulman on November 16, 2009, asking that the Council on American-Islamic Relations (CAIR) be investigated for excessive lobbying and failing to register as a lobbying organization. The request came in the wake of the publication of a book, Muslim Mafia, the foreword of which had been penned by Myrick, that portrayed CAIR as a subversive organization allied with international terrorists.

==== Criticism of the National Science Foundation ====
On May 26, 2011, Coburn released a 73-page report, "National Science Foundation: Under the Microscope", receiving attention from The New York Times, Fox News and MSNBC.

==== STOCK Act ====
Coburn was one of three senators who voted against the Stop Trading on Congressional Knowledge Act (STOCK Act). On February 3, 2012, Coburn released the following statement regarding the Act:

It's disappointing the Senate spent a week debating a bill that duplicates existing law and fails to address the real problems facing the country. The only way we can restore confidence in Congress is to make hard choices and solve real problems by doing things like reforming our tax code, repairing our safety net and reducing our crushing debt burden. Doing anything less will further alienate the American people and rightfully so.

==== Committee assignments ====
Coburn was a member of the following committees:

- Committee on Homeland Security and Governmental Affairs (Ranking Member)
  - Permanent Subcommittee on Investigations
  - Subcommittee on Financial and Contracting Oversight
  - Subcommittee on the Efficiency and Effectiveness of Federal Programs and the Federal Workforce
  - Subcommittee on Emergency Management, Intergovernmental Affairs, and the District of Columbia
- Select Committee on Intelligence
- Committee on Banking, Housing, and Urban Affairs
  - Subcommittee on Economic Policy
  - Subcommittee on Securities, Insurance, and Investment
  - Subcommittee on Housing, Transportation, and Community Development

== Political positions ==
=== Abortion ===
Coburn opposed abortion, with the exception of abortions necessary to save the life of the mother. In 2000, he sponsored a bill to prevent the Food and Drug Administration from developing, testing, or approving the abortifacient RU-486. On July 13, the bill failed in the House of Representatives by a vote of 182 to 187. On the issue, Coburn sparked controversy with his remark, "I favor the death penalty for abortionists and other people who take life." He noted that his great-grandmother was raped by a sheriff.

Coburn was one of the original authors of the federal Partial-Birth Abortion Ban Act upheld by the United States Supreme Court in Gonzales v. Carhart. The act relied on an expansive view of the Constitution's Commerce Clause, as it applies to "any physician who, in or affecting interstate or foreign commerce, knowingly performs a partial-birth abortion". The Act's reliance on such a broad reading of the Commerce Clause was criticized by Independence Institute scholar David Kopel and University of Tennessee law professor Glenn Reynolds, who noted that "[u]nless a physician is operating a mobile abortion clinic on the Metroliner, it is not really possible to perform an abortion 'in or affecting interstate or foreign commerce.'" When Coburn later called Supreme Court nominee Elena Kagan "ignorant" due to her "very expansive view" of the Commerce Clause, his support for the Act was used by Kagan supporters who charged him with hypocrisy on the issue.

On September 14, 2005, during the confirmation hearings for Supreme Court nominee John Roberts, Coburn began his opening statement with a critique of Beltway partisan politics while, according to news reports, "choking back a sob". Coburn had earlier been completing a crossword puzzle during the hearings, and this fact was highlighted by The Daily Show with Jon Stewart to ridicule Coburn's pathos. Coburn then began his questioning by discussing the various legal terms mentioned during the previous day's hearings. Proceeding to questions regarding both abortion and end-of-life issues, Coburn, who noted that during his tenure as an obstetrician he had delivered some 4,000 babies, asked Roberts whether the judge agreed with the proposition that "the opposite of being dead is being alive."

You know I'm going somewhere. One of the problems I have is coming up with just the common sense and logic that if brain wave and heartbeat signifies life, the absence of them signifies death, then the presence of them certainly signifies life. And to say it otherwise, logically is schizophrenic. And that's how I view a lot of the decisions that have come from the Supreme Court on the issue of abortion.

=== Climate change ===
Coburn on the 2015 Paris Agreement (a global effort to reduce carbon emissions), claiming it was 'poorly negotiated' in an interview with TheStreet.

Coburn was a climate change denier, saying in 2013: "I am a global warming denier, and I don't deny that". He had previously described climate science as "crap". In 2011, Coburn introduced a bill with Democratic Maryland Senator Ben Cardin, to end the ethanol blenders' tax credit—a subsidy designed to encourage oil companies to blend more environmentally friendly ethanol into the fuels they sold to drivers. Coburn asserted that climate change was a natural phenomenon, and that it was leading to a "mini-ice age". In 2017, Coburn discussed the Paris Agreement and denied the scientific consensus on human-caused global warming. He claimed that sea level rise had been no more than 5 mm in 25 years, and asserted there was now global cooling.

=== Fiscal conservatism ===
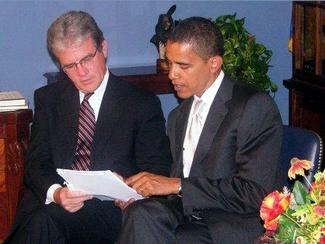
Senators Coburn and Barack Obama discuss S. 2590 in 2006

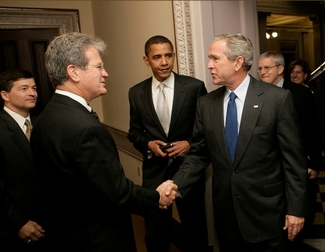
Senators Coburn and Obama and Congressman Jeb Hensarling greet President George W. Bush at the signing ceremony of the Federal Funding Accountability and Transparency Act of 2006

The best-known of Coburn's amendments was an amendment to the fiscal 2006 appropriations bill that funds transportation projects. Coburn's amendment would have transferred funding from the Bridge to Nowhere in Alaska to rebuild Louisiana's "Twin Spans" bridge, which was devastated by Hurricane Katrina. The amendment was defeated in the Senate, 82–14, after Ted Stevens, the senior senator from Alaska, threatened to resign his office if the amendment were passed. Coburn's actions did result in getting the funds made into a more politically feasible block grant to the State of Alaska, which could use the funds for the bridge or other projects. The renovations for the Elizabethtown Amtrak Station were cited by Coburn as an example of pork barrel spending in the stimulus bill.

Coburn was also a member of the Fiscal Watch Team, a group of seven senators led by John McCain, whose stated goal was to combat "wasteful government spending".

On April 6, 2006, Coburn and Senators Barack Obama, Thomas Carper and John McCain introduced the Federal Funding Accountability and Transparency Act of 2006. The bill requires the full disclosure of all entities and organizations receiving federal funds beginning in fiscal year (FY) 2007 on a website maintained by the Office of Management and Budget. The bill was signed into law on September 26, 2006.

Coburn and McCain noted that the practice of members of Congress adding earmarks had risen dramatically over the years, from 121 earmarks in 1987 to 15,268 earmarks in 2005, according to the Congressional Research Service.

In July 2007, Coburn criticized pork-barrel spending that Nebraska Senator Ben Nelson had inserted into the 2007 defense spending bill. Coburn said that the earmarks would benefit Nelson's son Patrick's employer with millions in federal dollars and that the situation violated terms of the Transparency Act, which was passed by the Senate but had not yet been voted on in the House. Nelson's spokesperson said the Senator did nothing wrong. At that time, newspapers in Nebraska and Oklahoma noted that Coburn failed to criticize very similar earmarks that had benefited Oklahoma.

In 1997, Coburn introduced a bill called the HIV Prevention Act of 1997, which would have amended the Social Security Act. The bill would have required confidential notification of HIV exposure to the sexual partners of those diagnosed with HIV, along with counseling and testing.

In 2010, Coburn called for a freeze on defense spending. Coburn served on the Simpson-Bowles debt reduction commission in 2010 and was one of the only Republicans in Congress open to tax increases as a means of balancing the budget.

In 2011 Coburn broke with Americans for Tax Reform with an ethanol amendment that gathered 70 votes in the Senate. He said that anti-tax activist Grover Norquist's influence was overstated, and that revenue increases were needed in order to "fix the country".

In 2012, Coburn identified less than $7 billion a year in possible defense savings and over half of these savings were to be through the elimination of military personnel involved in supply, transportation, and communications services.

In May 2013, after tornadoes ripped through his state, Coburn said that any new funding allocated for disaster relief needed to be offset by cuts to other federal spending.

Coburn was a fierce critic of the plan to attempt to defund the Affordable Care Act by shutting down the federal government, saying that the strategy was "doomed to fail" and that Ted Cruz and others who supported the plan had a "short-term goal with lousy tactics".

=== Gun rights ===
In regards to the Second Amendment, Coburn believed that it "recognizes the right of individual, law-abiding citizens to own and use firearms", and he opposed "any and all efforts to mandate gun control on law-abiding citizens". On the Credit CARD Act of 2009, which aimed "to establish fair and transparent practices relating to the extension of credit under an open-end consumer credit plan and for other purposes", Coburn sponsored an amendment that would allow concealed carry of firearms in national parks. The Senate passed the amendment 67–29.

Coburn placed a hold on final Senate consideration of a measure passed by the House in the wake of the Virginia Tech shootings to improve state performance in checking the federal watch list of gun buyers. However, after the Sandy Hook massacre in December 2012, Coburn (who had already announced he would not run for re-election) reversed himself and came out in support of universal background checks. Coburn partnered with Democratic members of the Senate such as Charles Schumer and Joe Manchin (to whose re-election campaign Coburn donated money) to determine what a universal background check measure should look like. However, these talks ultimately broke down, and in April 2013, Coburn was one of 46 senators to vote against the amendment in its final form, defeating its passage.

=== Health care reform ===
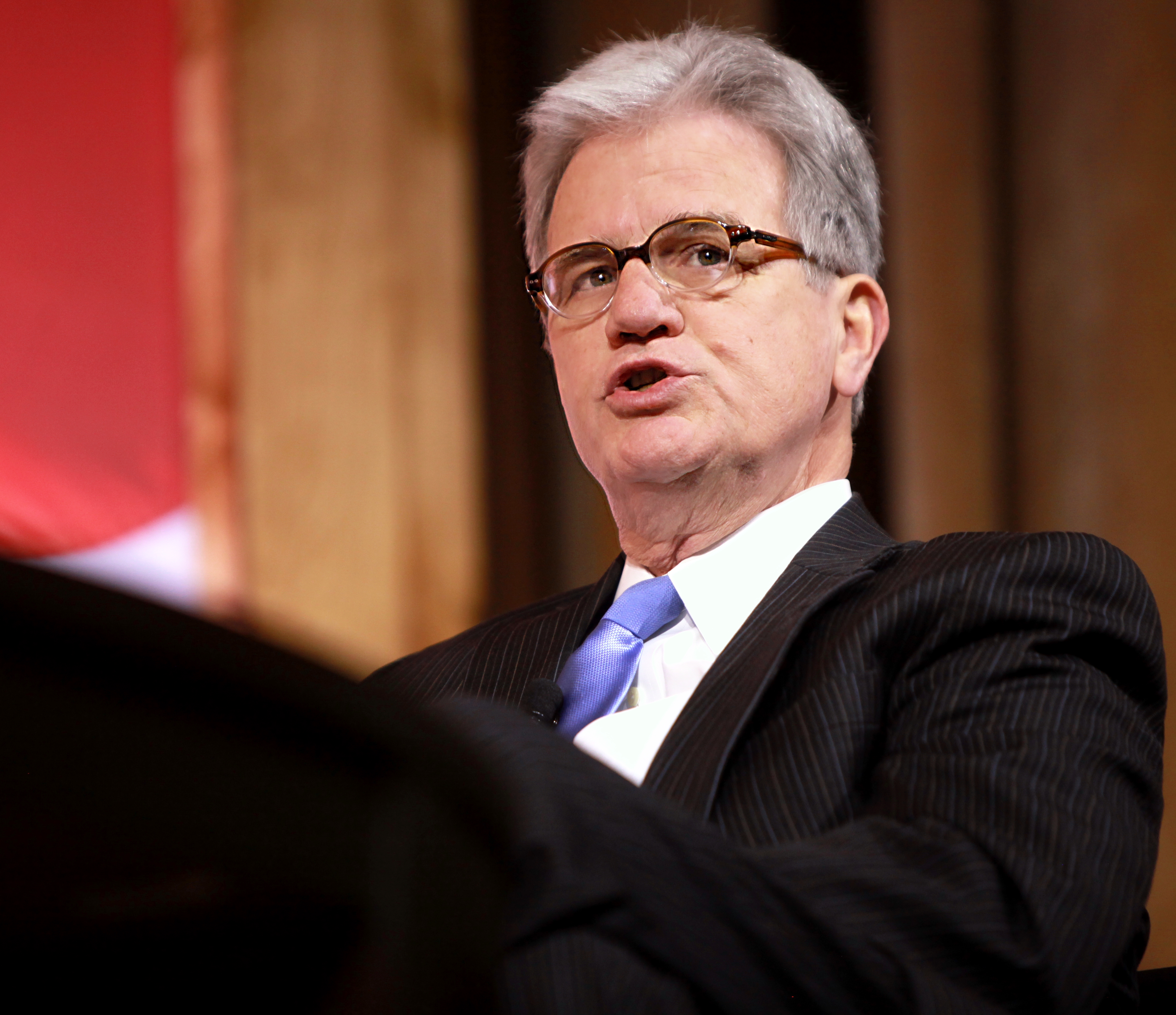
Senator Coburn at the 2014 Conservative Political Action Conference (CPAC) in Maryland

Coburn voted against the Patient Protection and Affordable Care Act in December 2009, and against the Health Care and Education Reconciliation Act of 2010.

Coburn co-authored the Patients Choice Act of 2009 (S. 1099), a Republican plan for health care reform in the United States, which required the U.S. Secretary of Health and Human Services (HHS) to convene an interagency coordinating committee to develop a national strategic plan for prevention in its first section, and provided for health promotion and disease prevention activities consistent with such a plan, while seeking to terminate the Agency for Healthcare Research and Quality. The act set forth provisions governing the establishment and operation of state-based health care exchanges to facilitate the individual purchase of private health insurance, and the creation of a market where private health plans compete for enrollees based on price and quality; it intended to amend the Internal Revenue Code to allow a refundable tax credit for qualified health care insurance coverage. The act also set forth programs to prevent Medicare fraud and abuse, including ending the use of social security numbers to identify Medicare beneficiaries.

=== Presidential nominations to the Judicial and Executive branches of government ===
During the administration of President George W. Bush, Coburn spoke out against the threat by some Democrats to filibuster nominations to judicial and Executive Branch positions. He took the position that no presidential nomination should ever be filibustered, in light of the wording of the U.S. Constitution. Coburn said, "There is a defined charge to the president and the Senate on advice and consent."

In May 2009, Coburn was the only Senator to vote against the confirmation of Gil Kerlikowske as the Director of the National Drug Control Policy.

=== Same-sex marriage ===
Coburn opposed same-sex marriage. In 2006, he voted in support of a proposed constitutional amendment to ban it.

=== War in Iraq ===
On May 24, 2007, the U.S. Senate voted 80–14 to fund the war in Iraq, which included U.S. Troop Readiness, Veterans' Care, Katrina Recovery, and Iraq Accountability Appropriations Act, 2007. Coburn voted nay. On October 1, 2007, the Senate voted 92–3 to fund the war in Iraq. Coburn voted nay. In February 2008, Coburn said, "I will tell you personally that I think it was probably a mistake going to Iraq."

On December 15, 2014, Coburn stalled the Clay Hunt Suicide Prevention for American Veterans Act aimed at stemming veteran suicides. The bill would require a report on successful veteran suicide prevention programs and allow the United States Veterans Administration to pay incentives to hire psychiatrists. Paul Rieckhoff, CEO of Iraq and Afghanistan Veterans of America, said that despite his reputation as a budget hawk, Coburn should have recognized that the $22 million cost of the bill is worth the lives it would have saved. "It's a shame that after two decades of service in Washington, Sen. Coburn will always be remembered for this final, misguided attack on veterans nationwide," he said. "If it takes 90 days for the new Congress to re-pass this bill, the statistics tell us another 1,980 vets will have died by suicide. That should be a heavy burden on the conscience of Sen. Coburn and this Congress." Speaking out against the legislation, Coburn said "I object, not because I don't want to save suicides, but because I don't think this bill will do the first thing to change what's happening," arguing that the bill "throws money and doesn't solve the real problem".

== Post-Senate career ==
After resigning from the Senate, Coburn joined Citizens for Self-Governance as a senior advisor to the group's Convention of States project, which seeks to convene a convention to propose amendments to the United States Constitution. In 2017, he authored a book on the subject titled Smashing the DC Monopoly: Using Article V to Restore Freedom and Stop Runaway Government.

Coburn was affiliated with the Manhattan Institute for Policy Research, consulting on the institute's Project FDA, an effort to promote faster drug approval processes. He also sat on the board of the Benjamin Rush Institute, a conservative association of medical students across 20 medical schools. In 2016, he became a Manhattan Institute senior fellow.

== Awards ==
In 2013, Coburn received the U.S. Senator John Heinz Award for Greatest Public Service by an Elected or Appointed Official, an award given out annually by the Jefferson Awards.

== Personal life ==
Despite their stark ideological differences, Coburn was a close friend of President Barack Obama. Their friendship began in 2005 when they both arrived in the Senate at the same time. They worked together on political ethics reform legislation, to set up an online federal spending database and to crack down on no-bid contracting at the Federal Emergency Management Agency in the wake of Hurricane Katrina. In April 2011, Coburn spoke to Bloomberg TV about Obama, saying, "I love the man. I think he's a neat man. I don't want him to be president, but I still love him. He is our President. He's my President. And I disagree with him adamantly on 95% of the issues, but that doesn't mean I can't have a great relationship. And that's a model people ought to follow."

Before the 2009 BCS game between the Oklahoma Sooners and the Florida Gators, Coburn made a bet over the outcome of the game with Florida Senator Bill Nelson—the loser had to serenade the winner with a song. The Gators defeated the Sooners and Coburn sang Elton John's "Rocket Man" to Nelson, who had once flown into space.

=== Illness and death ===
In November 2013, Coburn made public that he had been diagnosed with prostate cancer. In 2011, he had prostate cancer surgery while also surviving colon cancer and melanoma. His illness led him to resign from the Senate in 2015.

Coburn died at his home in Tulsa on March 28, 2020 at age 72. A memorial service to honor his life was held a year later on May 1, 2021, at South Tulsa Baptist Church.

== Electoral history ==
Oklahoma's 2nd congressional district results 1994–1998
Year	Democratic	Votes	Pct	Republican	Votes	Pct	3rd party	Party	Votes	Pct
1994	Virgil R. Cooper	75,943	48%	Tom Coburn	82,479	52%				
1996	Glen D. Johnson	90,120	45%	Tom Coburn (incumbent)	112,273	55%				
1998	Kent Pharaoh	59,042	40%	Tom Coburn (incumbent)	85,581	58%	Albert Jones	Independent	3,641	2%

Oklahoma Senator (Class III) results 2004–2010
Year	Democratic	Votes	Pct	Republican	Votes	Pct	3rd party	Party	Votes	Pct	3rd party	Party	Votes	Pct
2004	Brad Carson	596,750	41%	Tom Coburn	763,433	53%	Sheila Bilyeu	Independent	86,663	6%				
2010	Jim Rogers	265,519	26%	Tom Coburn (incumbent)	716,347	71%	Stephen Wallace	Independent	25,048	2%	Ronald Dwyer	Independent	7,807	1%

== Books ==
External videos
- Presentation by Coburn on Breach of Trust, October 2, 2003, C-SPAN
- Presentation by Coburn on Breach of Trust, December 15, 2005, C-SPAN
- Presentation by Coburn on The Debt Bomb, June 30, 2012, C-SPAN
- Interview with Coburn on Smashing the DC Monopoly, May 23, 2017, C-SPAN

- Breach of Trust: How Washington Turns Outsiders Into Insiders. Nashville: WND Books. 2003. ISBN 9780785262206. (with John Hart)
- The Debt Bomb: A Bold Plan to Stop Washington from Bankrupting America. Nashville: Thomas Nelson. 2012. ISBN 978-1595554673. (with John Hart)
- Smashing the DC Monopoly: Using Article V to Restore Freedom and Stop Runaway Government. WND Books. 2017. ISBN 9781944229757.

== See also ==
- Physicians in the United States Congress

U.S. House of Representatives
Preceded by Mike Synar	Member of the U.S. House of Representatives from Oklahoma's 2nd congressional district 1995–2001	Succeeded by Brad Carson
Party political offices
Preceded by Don Nickles	Republican nominee for U.S. Senator from Oklahoma (Class 3); 2004, 2010	Succeeded by James Lankford
U.S. Senate
Preceded by Don Nickles	U.S. senator (Class 3) from Oklahoma; 2005–2015; Served alongside: Jim Inhofe	Succeeded by James Lankford
Preceded by Susan Collins	Ranking Member of the Senate Homeland Security Committee; 2013–2015	Succeeded by Tom Carper
