= Regulation of artificial intelligence in the United States =

The United States federal government and state governments have developed some regulation of artificial intelligence, including executive orders, federal laws, and state laws. Federal agencies have also developed some sector-specific regulations related to AI.

At the federal level, the Biden administration released an October 2023 executive order about AI safety and security, Executive Order 14110, with directives related to AI development and deployment. President Trump revoked that executive order in January 2025 and issued Executive Order 14179. In December 2025, President Trump signed Executive Order 14365, an executive order directing federal agencies to develop a unified national approach to AI policy, evaluate state AI laws for potential conflicts, challenge them through legal action, and condition certain federal funding on state compliance, while exempting state laws related to child safety, data center infrastructure, and state government procurement. In 2025, Congress passed legislation targeting AI-generated deepfakes, the TAKE IT DOWN Act.

Several U.S. states have enacted laws related to artificial intelligence. Some are already in effect, including in California. Other states have AI-related legislation coming into effect in 2026 and 2027. In 2025 and 2026, the Trump administration mentioned the patchwork nature of state legislation as a motivation for its push for unified national legislation regulating AI. The administration has criticized state lawmakers, threatened to sue states, and issued letters to discourage them from regulating AI companies and products; some states have continued to propose and enact related laws.

Discussions about regulating AI have included topics such as the timeliness of regulating AI, the nature of the federal regulatory framework to govern and promote AI, including what agency should lead, the regulatory and governing powers of that agency, and how to update regulations in the face of rapidly changing technology, as well as the roles of state governments and courts.

In the 2026 Global Index on Responsible AI, the United States scored 53.3, ahead of 81% of the 135 countries and jurisdictions assessed, 0.9 points below the Northern America average (54.2) and 1.2 points above the high-income average (52.1).

== Federal government ==
=== Obama administration (2009–2017) ===
Preparing for the Future of Artificial Intelligence

By 2016, the Obama administration had begun to focus on the risks and regulation of artificial intelligence. In an October 2016 report, Preparing for the Future of Artificial Intelligence, the National Science and Technology Council recommended an approach "informed by assessment of the aspects of risk that the addition of AI may reduce, alongside the aspects of risk that it may increase" and reported a consensus of public commenters that "broad regulation of AI research or practice would be inadvisable at this time".

Also published in October 2016, the first National Artificial Intelligence Research and Development Strategic Plan identified seven research priorities. The Trump administration's June 2019 Update added expansion of public–private partnerships as an eighth priority. The Biden administration's May 2023 Update added international collaboration as a ninth priority.

A December 2016 report titled Artificial Intelligence, Automation, and the Economy discussed AI-related economic policies, including labor-market adjustments, income support, and distribution of gains from automation.

=== First Trump administration (2017–2021) ===
On August 13, 2018, Section 1051 of the Fiscal Year 2019 John S. McCain National Defense Authorization Act (P.L. 115-232) established the National Security Commission on Artificial Intelligence "to consider the methods and means necessary to advance the development of artificial intelligence, machine learning, and associated technologies to comprehensively address the national security and defense needs of the United States." Steering on regulating security-related AI is provided by the National Security Commission on Artificial Intelligence. The Artificial Intelligence Initiative Act (S.1558) is a proposed bill that would establish a federal initiative designed to accelerate research and development on AI for, inter alia, the economic and national security of the United States.

On January 7, 2019, following an Executive Order on Maintaining American Leadership in Artificial Intelligence, the White House's Office of Science and Technology Policy released a draft Guidance for Regulation of Artificial Intelligence Applications, which includes ten principles for United States agencies when deciding whether and how to regulate AI. In response, the National Institute of Standards and Technology (NIST) released a position paper, and the Defense Innovation Board issued recommendations on the ethical use of AI. A year later, the administration called for comments on regulation in another draft of its Guidance for Regulation of Artificial Intelligence Applications.

Other specific agencies working on the regulation of AI included the Food and Drug Administration, which created pathways to regulate the incorporation of AI in medical imaging. The National Science and Technology Council also published an updated National Artificial Intelligence Research and Development Strategic Plan in 2019, which received public scrutiny and recommendations to further improve it towards enabling Trustworthy AI.

=== Biden administration (2021–2025) ===
In March 2021, the National Security Commission on Artificial Intelligence released their final report. In the report, they stated, "Advances in AI, including the mastery of more general AI capabilities along one or more dimensions, will likely provide new capabilities and applications. Some of these advances could lead to inflection points or leaps in capabilities. Such advances may also introduce new concerns and risks and the need for new policies, recommendations, and technical advances to assure that systems are aligned with goals and values, including safety, robustness and trustworthiness."

In June 2022, Senators Rob Portman and Gary Peters introduced the Global Catastrophic Risk Management Act. The bipartisan bill "would also help counter the risk of artificial intelligence... from being abused in ways that may pose a catastrophic risk". On October 4, 2022, President Joe Biden unveiled a new AI Bill of Rights, which outlines five protections Americans should have in the AI age: 1. Safe and Effective Systems, 2. Algorithmic Discrimination Protection, 3.Data Privacy, 4. Notice and Explanation, and 5. Human Alternatives, Consideration, and Fallback. The bill was formally published in October 2022 by the Office of Science and Technology Policy (OSTP), a U.S. government office that advises the President on science and technology policy matters.

In July 2023, the Biden administration secured voluntary commitments from seven companies – Amazon, Anthropic, Google, Inflection, Meta, Microsoft, and OpenAI – to manage the risks associated with AI. The companies committed to ensure AI products undergo both internal and external security testing before public release; to share information on the management of AI risks with the industry, governments, civil society, and academia; to prioritize cybersecurity and protect proprietary AI system components; to develop mechanisms to inform users when content is AI-generated, such as watermarking; to publicly report on their AI systems' capabilities, limitations, and areas of use; to prioritize research on societal risks posed by AI, including bias, discrimination, and privacy concerns; and to develop AI systems to address societal challenges, ranging from cancer prevention to climate change mitigation. In September 2023, eight additional companies – Adobe, Cohere, IBM, Nvidia, Palantir, Salesforce, Scale AI, and Stability AI – subscribed to these voluntary commitments.

In January 2023, the NIST released the Artificial Intelligence Risk Management Framework (AI RMF 1.0), providing voluntary guidance for organizations to identify, assess, and manage risks associated with AI systems.

The Biden administration, in October 2023 signaled that they would release an executive order leveraging the federal government's purchasing power to shape AI regulations, hinting at a proactive governmental stance in regulating AI technologies. On October 30, 2023, President Biden released Executive Order 14110 on Safe, Secure, and Trustworthy Artificial Intelligence. The Executive Order includes directives on standards for critical infrastructure, AI-enhanced cybersecurity, and federally funded biological synthesis projects. The Executive Order provides the authority to various agencies and departments of the US government, including the Energy and Defense departments, to apply existing consumer protection laws to AI development. The Executive Order builds on the Administration's earlier agreements with AI companies to instate new initiatives to "red-team" or stress-test AI dual-use foundation models, especially those that have the potential to pose security risks, with data and results shared with the federal government. The Executive Order also recognizes AI's social challenges, and calls for companies building AI dual-use foundation models to be wary of these societal problems. For example, the Executive Order states that AI should not "worsen job quality", and should not "cause labor-force disruptions". Additionally, Biden's Executive Order mandates that AI must "advance equity and civil rights", and cannot disadvantage marginalized groups. It also called for foundation models to include "watermarks" to help the public discern between human and AI-generated content, which has raised controversy and criticism from deepfake detection researchers. Biden also issued a National Security Memorandum on Artificial Intelligence in October 2024.

Federal grantmaking emerged as a mechanism of AI governance. Through discretionary grants, federal agencies set program objectives, eligibility criteria, and funding conditions in Notices of Funding Opportunity (NOFOs), which can shape how artificial intelligence technologies are developed and deployed by funding recipients. Guidance issued by the Office of Management and Budget (OMB) to implement the Executive Order's policies applied risk-management requirements primarily to procurement and agency uses of AI, while generally excluding federal financial assistance programs.

In April 2024, the Federal Trade Commission (FTC) announced Operation AI Comply, a cross-agency initiative to ensure that AI products and marketing claims comply with existing consumer-protection, fair-credit, and truth-in-advertising laws. The FTC stated that companies deploying AI systems must "keep their AI claims in check" and warned that false or misleading representations about AI capabilities would be subject to enforcement under the FTC Act.

In 2024, a bipartisan House task force released a report on artificial intelligence, while representatives Jay Obernolte and Lori Trahan subsequently developed a bipartisan proposal concerning AI regulation.

=== Second Trump administration (2025–present) ===
==== Executive orders ====
In January 2025, Trump revoked Biden's Executive Order 14110 (Executive Order on Safe, Secure, and Trustworthy Development and Use of Artificial Intelligence) by issuing Executive Order 14148 (Initial Rescissions of Harmful Executive Orders and Actions), reflecting his administration's preference for deregulating AI in support of innovation over safeguarding risks. He then issued Executive Order 14179 (Removing Barriers to American Leadership in Artificial Intelligence), which called for development of a national "AI Action Plan" and aimed to strengthen U.S. leadership in AI.

A year later in December 2025, Trump signed Executive Order 14365, "Ensuring a National Policy Framework for Artificial Intelligence", which seeks to preempt state regulation. The White House published "A National Legislative Policy Framework for Artificial Intelligence: Legislative Recommendations" in March 2026, a set of recommendations to Congress for federal legislation. The recommendations ask Congress to act in various ways to implement the Trump administration's strategy for artificial intelligence policy.

In June 2026, Trump issued Executive Order 14409, "Promoting Advanced Artificial Intelligence Innovation and Security", directing agencies to strengthen federal cybersecurity, expand the use of AI-enabled defensive tools, establish a voluntary framework for secure deployment of frontier AI models, and prioritize enforcement against AI-enabled cybercrime. The framework for secure deployment outlined by the order includes the establishment of a "covered frontier model" designation, to be applied by the Director of the NSA in accordance with a "classified benchmarking process" to assess the capabilities of AI models. AI developers may voluntarily submit newly developed models to the federal government to determine if they qualify as "covered frontier models" and to provide the federal government with exclusive access for up to thirty days before models are released more broadly.

On September 29, 2026, Trump signed Executive Order 14434 which, among other effects, required the federal government to stop referring to computationally intelligent systems as "artificial intelligence" or "AI" and to instead use the terminology "Super Intelligence" or "SI". The order stated that the change in terminology was due to the fact that the latter "more appropriately captures the promise, potential, and rapidly advancing capabilities of these technologies." Some federal agencies such as the NIH displayed a banner on their websites advising the public of the change while being brought into compliance.

==== Legislation ====
In 2025, Congress passed legislation targeting AI-generated deepfakes, the TAKE IT DOWN Act, which prohibits nonconsensual disclosure of AI-generated "intimate imagery", requiring all platforms to remove such content. Lawmakers also reintroduced the CREATE AI Act to codify the National AI Research Resource (NAIRR), which aimed to expand public access to computing resources, datasets, and AI testing environments. Meanwhile, the Department of Commerce also expanded export controls on AI technology, and NIST published an updated set of guidances on AI cybersecurity risks.

In March 2025, OpenAI made a policy proposal for the Trump administration to preempt pending AI-related state laws with federal laws. Meta, Google, IBM and Andreessen Horowitz also pressured the government to adopt national rules that would rein in state laws, especially in California. At the time, the California legislature was considering several AI laws that would require insurance companies to report the use of AI when denying healthcare claims, as well as regulations that would require AI to be performance tested before making implementation on certain applications. In May 2025, House Republicans inserted into a tax and spending bill a clause banning state AI laws for 10 years, which was met with opposition from more than 100 nonprofit organizations, elected officials, public policy experts, and others. The Senate voted 99-1 to defeat the ban. In September 2025, Sen. Ted Cruz (a supporter of the AI state moratorium) said that the proposal would return for debate in Congress.

==== Other events ====
In June 2025, the U.S. Department of Commerce established the Center for AI Standards and Innovation (CAISI) as part of the NIST. CAISI serves as the federal government's primary point of contact for AI developers, streamlining coordination between private industry and the U.S. government on AI issues including security, evaluation, assessment, and the development of guidelines, standards, and best practices. CAISI is responsible for establishing agreements with AI industry leaders and developers to allow for federal government review processes of frontier AI models. By June 2026, Anthropic, Google, Microsoft, and OpenAI had established AI model review agreements with CAISI.

In August 2025, Silicon Valley companies and investors pledged up to $200 million to two new pro-AI super PACs, Meta California (funded by Meta) and Leading the Future. According to the New York Times, the super PACs criticize politicians who are "insufficiently supportive of the push into artificial intelligence" ahead of the 2026 midterm elections. In February 2026 the nonprofit organization Public First Action, which received a $20 million donation from Anthropic, announced plans to support political candidates that support regulation of AI.

Export controls on AI chips and semiconductors are imposed by the United States, restricting the export of technology and equipment related to artificial intelligence to other countries, primarily targeting China. In January 2026, BIS formalized a flexible license review policy for these transactions. This has happened in the context of a broader trade war. In June 2026, the U.S. Department of Commerce expanded export controls beyond AI hardware by requiring licenses for certain frontier artificial intelligence models from Anthropic, while authorizing release to specified trusted partners.

In September 2026, Trump announced an AI Force, to be led by an AI Czar. Senator Bernie Sanders and Representative Greg Casar introduced the "Ban Artificial Superintelligence Act" in the Senate, which would ban the creation of artificial superintelligence, referring to systems which exceed human abilities on most tasks or which are capable of destroying humanity.

== State and local government ==
Several states have proposed and passed laws that regulate AI models and AI-generated content, including impersonations, chatbot disclosures, and synthetic political content.

=== California ===
In February 2024, Senator Scott Wiener introduced the Safe and Secure Innovation for Frontier Artificial Intelligence Models Act to the California legislature. The bill drew heavily on the Biden executive order and had the goal of reducing catastrophic risks by mandating safety tests for the most powerful AI models. If passed, the bill would have established a publicly-funded cloud computing cluster in California. Governor Gavin Newsom vetoed the bill in September 2024.

The Artificial Intelligence Training Data Transparency Act (AB 2013) and Transparency in Frontier Artificial Intelligence Act (TFAIA) (SB 53) went into effect on January 1, 2026. In addition, the California AI Transparency Act will go into effect in August 2026. By signing TFAIA into law in September 2025, California became the first state to enact a statute specifically addressing the development of frontier AI models. The TFAIA protects whistleblowers who have reasonable cause to believe their employers are endangering lives or causing damages worth $1 billion. It also requires companies to publish their safety test results.

On September 9, 2026, Gavin Newsom signed Senate Bill 813 and Assembly Bill 1405. The bills outline a regulatory framework for the independent auditing of AI systems.

The political action committee Parents & Kids Safe AI Coalition, funded by OpenAI, has been involved in efforts to establish legislation related to child safety and AI in California.

In September 2024, Alameda County's Board of Supervisors approved a countywide policy for agency and department usage of generative artificial intelligence (GenAI) technology. The policy states the goal of its creation is to assist employees of the county in their daily operations to boost efficiency and productivity in a responsible, secure, and uniform manner across the county's many taskforces. With its publication, Alameda County became one of several counties across the nation willing to publicly disclose their AI policy, allowing any curious person to read the full policy online. In order to reap the benefits that GenAI can offer as a tool for county business, it is required per the policy, that any GenAI software is to be approved by the county's Information Technology Department. The policy is meant to supplement, not replace, statewide laws and regulations pertaining to the use of AI.

=== Colorado ===
On May 17, 2024, Colorado Governor Jared Polis signed the Colorado AI Act (CAIA) into law. The CAIA establishes requirements for deployers and developers of high-risk AI systems, including transparency obligations and risk assessments, to prevent algorithmic discrimination against Colorado residents. It is the first comprehensive, state-level law that regulates high-risk AI systems in the United States. The law was unpopular among pro-business advocates. An attempt to amend the regulation failed, but its implementation was delayed from the original February 1, 2026 start date to an expected June 1, 2026 start. Jared Polis has created a committee to investigate its implementation. Brianna Titone, the bill's sponsor, criticized the commission for being full of industry representatives without representation from consumers across the state.

On May 14, 2026, Polis signed into law SB 26-189, which repealed and replaced CAIA. The replacement law eliminated the focus on high-risk systems; instead, it requires companies that deploy AI for decision-making related to certain topics (like employment or housing) to inform individuals that AI is being used.

=== New York ===
In January 2023, the New York City Bias Audit Law (Local Law 144) was enacted by the NYC Council in November 2021. Originally due to come into effect on 1 January 2023, the enforcement date for Local Law 144 has been pushed back due to the high volume of comments received during the public hearing on the Department of Consumer and Worker Protection's (DCWP) proposed rules to clarify the requirements of the legislation. It eventually became effective on July 5, 2023. From this date, the companies that are operating and hiring in New York City are prohibited from using automated tools to hire candidates or promote employees, unless the tools have been independently audited for bias.

The Responsible AI Safety and Education Act (RAISE Act) is a New York State law that imposes transparency, safety, and reporting requirements on developers of large frontier artificial intelligence models. The law was signed by Governor Kathy Hochul on December 19, 2025. It is expected to take effect on January 1, 2027.

=== Tennessee ===
On March 21, 2024, the State of Tennessee enacted legislation called the ELVIS Act, aimed specifically at audio deepfakes, and voice cloning. This legislation was the first enacted legislation in the nation aimed at regulating AI simulation of image, voice and likeness. The bill passed unanimously in the Tennessee House of Representatives and Senate. This legislation's success was hoped by its supporters to inspire similar actions in other states, contributing to a unified approach to copyright and privacy in the digital age, and to reinforce the importance of safeguarding artists' rights against unauthorized use of their voices and likenesses.

=== Texas ===
On June 22, 2025, Texas Governor Greg Abbott signed the Texas Responsible Artificial Intelligence Governance Act (TRAIGA) into law. The legislation took effect on January 1, 2026. The act applies to developers and deployers of artificial intelligence systems used by Texas residents and prohibits the development and deployment of AI systems intended to incite violence, self-harm, unlawful discrimination, and other illegal activities. The law also restricts Texas state government entities from using AI systems for social scoring of consumers or for identifying individuals using biometric data without their consent. In addition, TRAIGA established the Texas Artificial Intelligence Council, which is tasked with providing recommendations on the use of AI systems by state agencies, and a regulatory sandbox program.

Texas Senate Bill 20 (S.B. 20), also known as the "Stopping AI-Generated Child Pornography Act", was signed into law on June 20, 2025.

=== Utah ===
On March 13, 2024, Utah Governor Spencer Cox signed the Artificial Intelligence Policy Act (S.B 149). This legislation went into effect on May 1, 2024. It established liability, notably for companies that do not disclose their use of generative AI when required by state consumer protection laws, or when users commit criminal offense using generative AI. It also created the Office of Artificial Intelligence Policy and the Artificial Intelligence Learning Laboratory Program.

== See also ==
- Artificial Intelligence Act — 2024 European Union regulation
- Privacy laws of the United States
- Use of artificial intelligence by the United States Department of Defense
- Americans for Responsible Innovation - nonprofit advocacy group
