= The Midas Project =

American AI safety watchdog organization

- Formation: 2024
- Founder: Tyler Johnston
- Type: Watchdog organization, Nonprofit
- Headquarters: United States
- Website: www.themidasproject.com

The Midas Project is an American watchdog nonprofit focused on AI safety. It was founded in 2024 by Tyler Johnston, who serves as its executive director. The organization advocates for stricter safety standards and increased transparency at artificial intelligence (AI) companies.

== History ==
In mid-2024, The Midas Project started tracking how AI companies such as OpenAI, Google and Anthropic are adjusting their policies. Updates are published on a dedicated account on the social networking site X. One change tracked was Anthropic's removal of Biden-era responsible AI commitments from its website.

In February 2025, the organization published the "Seoul Tracker", a website evaluating whether companies were honoring promises made at the AI Seoul Summit 2024 to adopt responsible scaling policies. According to the tracker, six companies, including OpenAI, Google and Anthropic, fulfilled all their promises to varying degrees with four companies such as xAI and Meta following through with some of them and six companies, among them IBM and Samsung Electronics, implementing none of the promised measures.

In June 2025, the group released "The OpenAI Files" together with The Tech Oversight Project. The document describes alleged issues with governance, leadership and safety culture at OpenAI.

In July 2025, the report "How Anthropic's AI Safety Framework Misses the Mark" was published, criticizing a lack of rigor in Anthropic's responsible scaling policy. The Midas Project also filed an IRS complaint alleging that OpenAI was undermining its nonprofit obligations with its planned restructuring.

In August 2025, The Midas Project published an open letter asking OpenAI for transparency about its transition to a for-profit company. The letter garnered over 10,000 signatories, among them "more than 100 prominent figures — including Nobel Prize winners, professors, and former OpenAI employees".

In September 2025, both the nonprofit and Johnston himself were among those receiving subpoenas from OpenAI, accusing them of being funded by Elon Musk as part of the Musk v. Altman lawsuit. Johnston denied the allegations, pointing to past criticism of xAI making OpenAI look "saintly in comparison". He also claimed that the related news coverage led to him being denied insurance. The subpoenas were described as overly broad and OpenAI was accused of using them to intimidate critics.

In April 2026, through its publication Model Republic, The Midas Project published an investigation linking the OpenAI-affiliated super PAC network Leading the Future to The Wire By Acutus, an automated news website that allegedly used AI agents posing as human journalists to solicit interviews.

In June 2026, The Midas Project reported on a series of sock puppet accounts that were connected to Build American AI, the advocacy offshoot of Leading th Future. One of the accounts, "@JonathanDoomer", presented as a genuine AI critic posting content that expressed pro-China views and anti-innovation views as well as memes promoting violence to stop the spread of AI. Politico later characterized the account as a "strawman for the arguments LTF felt the other side was making". In response to the reporting from The Midas Project, Build American AI said that the accounts were not a "core part of their strategy".

== See also ==
- Regulation of artificial intelligence in the United States
