= Chief technology officer =

Officer in charge of technical operations

- Synonyms: CTO, chief technical officer, chief technologist

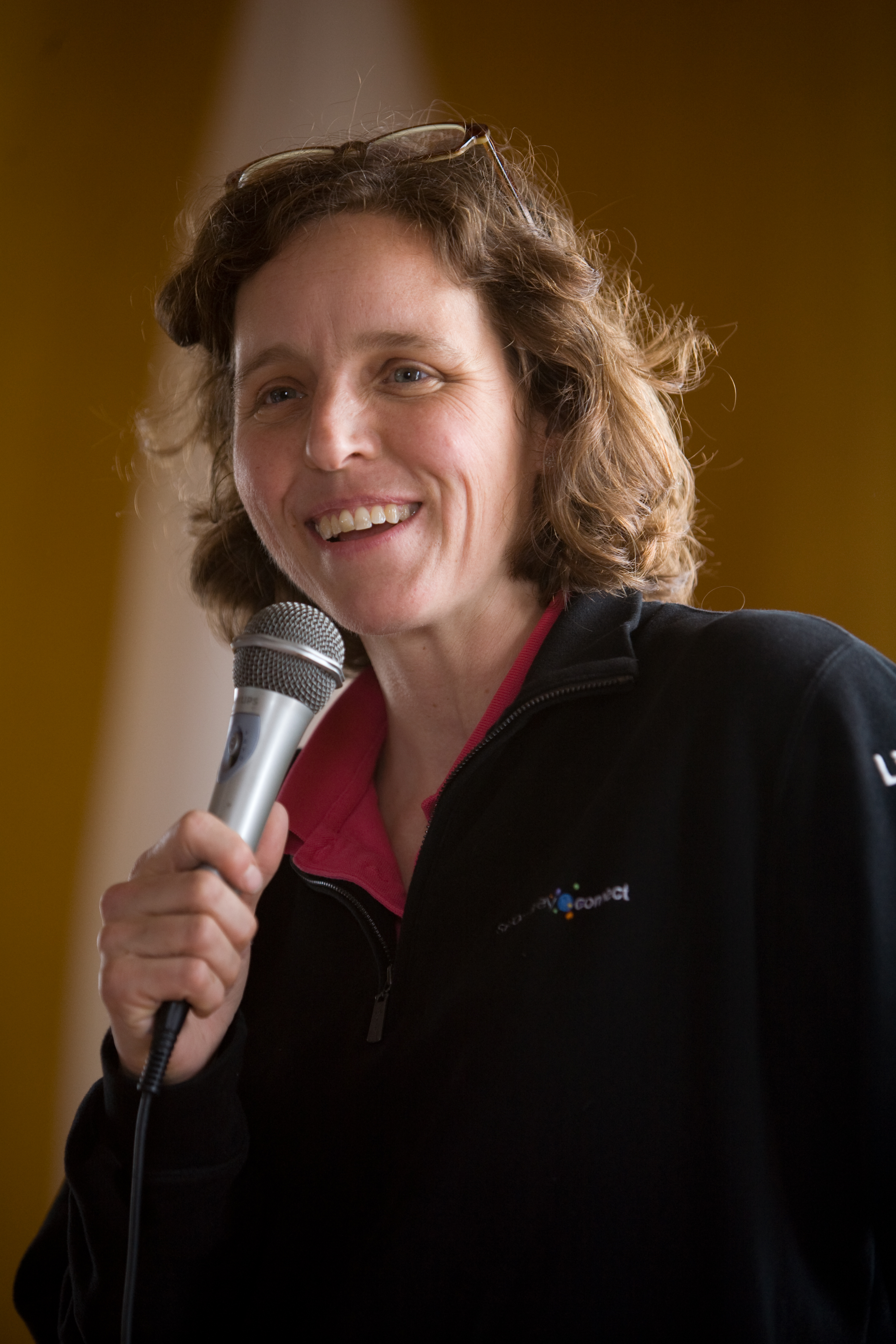
Megan Smith, Chief Technology Officer of the United States from 2014–2017

A chief technology officer (CTO), chief technical officer, or chief technologist is a corporate officer tasked with managing technical operations of an organization. They oversee and supervise research and development and serve as a technical advisor to a higher executive such as a chief executive officer.

A CTO is very similar to a chief information officer (CIO). CTOs will make decisions for the overarching technology infrastructure that closely align with the organization's goals, while CIOs work alongside the organization's information technology ("IT") staff members to perform everyday operations. The attributes of the roles a CTO holds vary from one company to another, mainly depending on their organizational structure.

== History ==
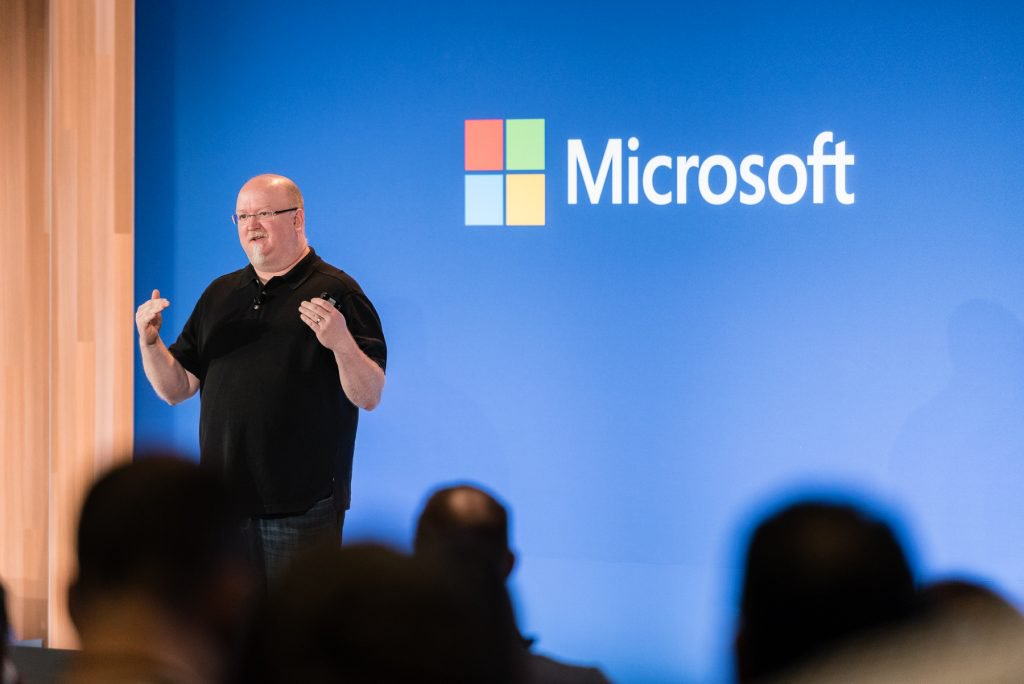
Kevin Scott, CTO of Microsoft

After World War II, large corporations established research laboratories at locations separate from their headquarters. The corporation's goals were to hire scientists and offer them facilities to conduct research on behalf of the company without the burdens of day-to-day office work. This is where the idea of a CTO focusing on the overarching technology infrastructures originates.

At that time, the director of the laboratory was a corporate vice president who did not participate in the company's corporate decisions. Instead, the technical director was the individual responsible for attracting new scientists, to do research, and to develop products.

In the 1980s, the role of these research directors changed substantially. Since technology was becoming a fundamental part of the development for most products and services, companies needed an operational executive who could understand the product's technical side and provide advice on ways to improve and develop.

This all led to the creation of the position of Chief Technology Officer by large companies in the late 1980s with the growth of the information technology industry and computer (internet) companies.

== Overview ==
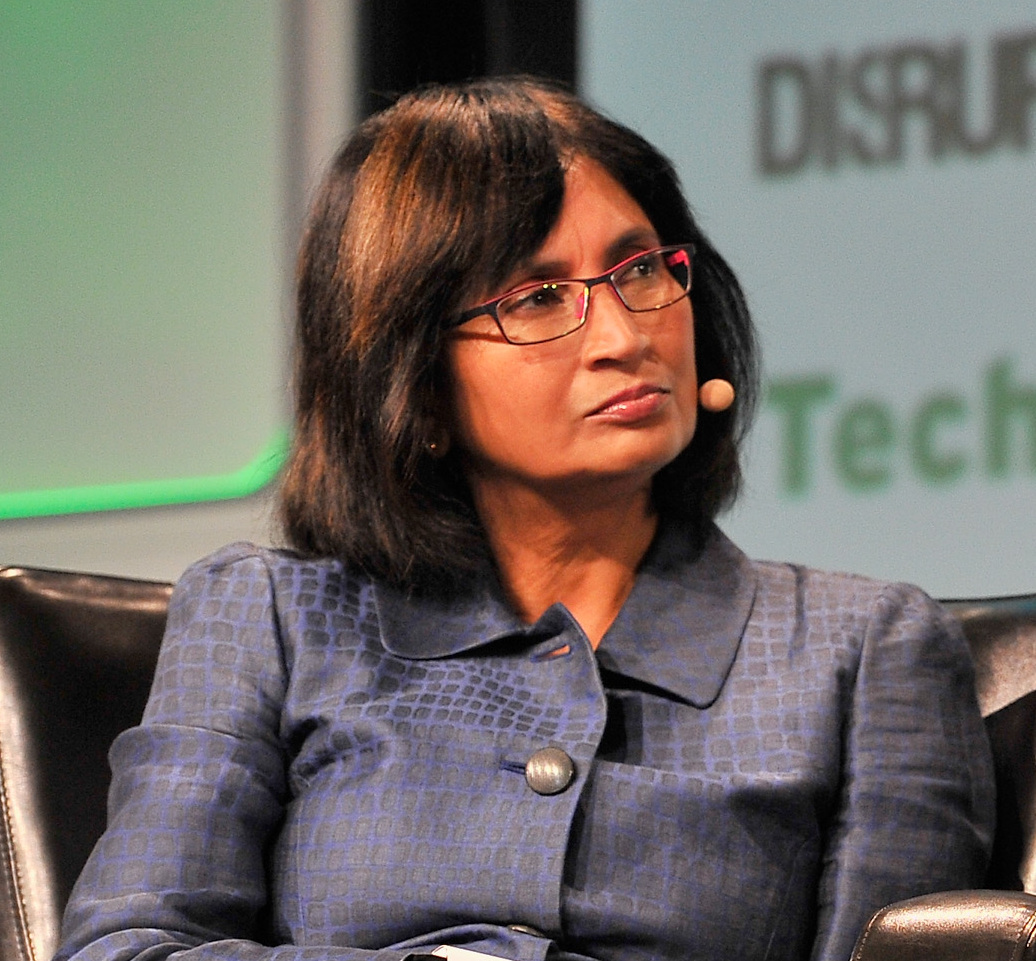
Padmasree Warrior, former CTO of Cisco and Motorola

A CTO "examines the short and long term needs of an organization, and utilizes capital to make investments designed to help the organization reach its objectives... [the CTO] is the highest technology executive position within a company and leads the technology or engineering department". The role became prominent with the ascent of the IT industry, but has since become prevalent in technology-based industries of all types – including computer-based technologies (such as game developer, e-commerce, and social networking service) and other/non-computer-focused technology (such as biotech/pharma, defense, and automotive). In non-technical organizations as a corporate officer position, the CTO typically reports directly to the chief information officer (CIO) and is primarily concerned with long-term and "big picture" issues (while still having deep technical knowledge of the relevant field). In technology-focused organizations, the CIO and CTO positions can be at the same level, with the CIO focused on the information technology and the CTO focused on the core company and other supporting technologies.

Depending on company structure and hierarchy, there may also be positions such as R&D manager, director of R&D and vice president of engineering whom the CTO interacts with or oversees. The CTO also needs a working familiarity with regulatory (e.g. U.S. Food and Drug Administration, Environmental Protection Agency, Consumer Product Safety Commission, as applicable) and intellectual property (IP) issues (e.g. patents, trade secrets, license contracts), and an ability to interface with legal counsel to incorporate these considerations into strategic planning and inter-company negotiations.

In many older industries (whose existence may predate IT automation) such as manufacturing, shipping or banking, an executive role of the CTO would often arise out of the process of automating existing activities; in these cases, any CTO-like role would only emerge if and when efforts would be made to develop truly novel technologies (either for facilitating internal operations or for enhancing products/services being provided), perhaps through "intrapreneuring".

== See also ==
- Chief creative officer
- Chief executive officer
- Chief innovation officer (CINO or CTIO)
- Chief scientific officer
- Chief security officer
- Chief AI officer
