= Parents & Kids Safe AI Coalition =

The Parents & Kids Safe AI Coalition is a political action committee that advocates for regulation of artificial intelligence on child safety. As of April 2026, the group is funded solely by the artificial intelligence company OpenAI, which pledged $10 million to the effort.

== History ==
In October 2025, California Gov. Gavin Newsom vetoed Assembly Bill 1064. Sponsored by Common Sense Media, the bill would have introduced stronger child safety protections for AI chatbots. The following month, Common Sense Media founder Jim Steyer filed a ballot initiative intended to restore the "guardrails" lost in the veto. In response, OpenAI introduced a competing initiative.

In January 2026, Common Sense Media and OpenAI announced that they would be working together on a compromise ballot initiative, the Parents & Kids Safe AI Act. Reporting indicated that initial outreach emails to child safety organizations failed to disclose OpenAI's involvement. Several advocacy groups signed an open letter claiming the initiative would shield AI companies from liability and undermine age verification, among other concerns.

After Common Sense Media met with opposing groups in February, the ballot initiative was put on hold and the organizations involved sought to negotiate with the Legislature instead. The Parents & Kids Safe AI Coalition was founded to support this effort.

In March 2026, the group reached out to some of the same groups contacted earlier, asking them to endorse its list of policy priorities. Again, some organizations reported being unaware of OpenAI's level of involvement. At least two groups withdrew from the coalition after learning about the financial ties. The priorities themselves were described as "vague but fairly uncontroversial" by The San Francisco Standard.

== See also ==
- Regulation of artificial intelligence in the United States
