= Brad Carson =

American politician (born 1967)

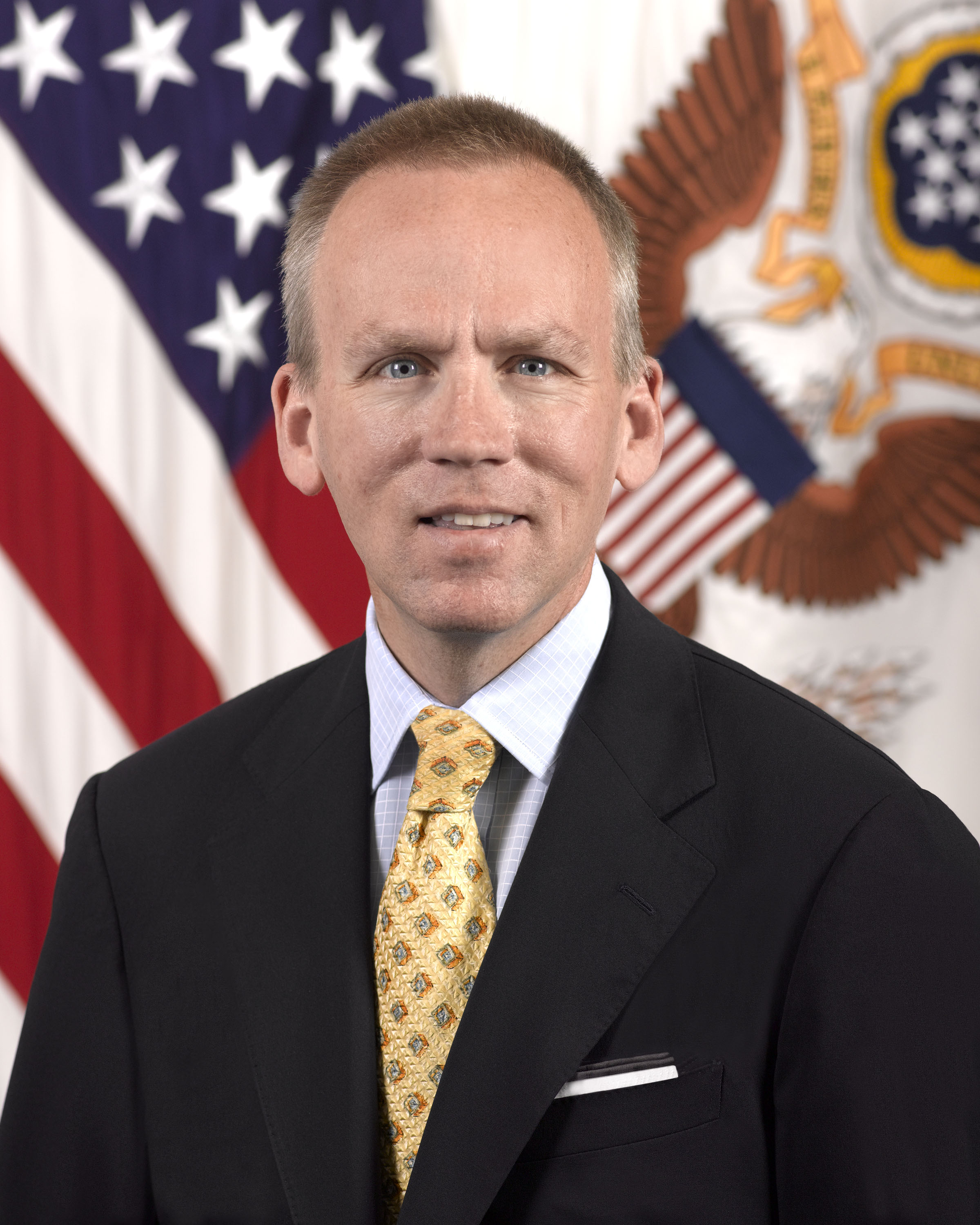
- Official portrait, 2014

21st President of the University of Tulsa
- In office July 1, 2021 – May 31, 2025
- Preceded by: Gerard Clancy
- Succeeded by: Rick Dickson (acting)

Under Secretary of Defense for Personnel and Readiness
- Acting
- In office April 2, 2015 – April 8, 2016
- Appointed by: Barack Obama
- Preceded by: Jessica Wright
- Succeeded by: Peter Levine (acting)

United States Under Secretary of the Army
- In office March 28, 2014 – June 30, 2015
- President: Barack Obama
- Preceded by: Joseph W. Westphal
- Succeeded by: Patrick Murphy

General Counsel of the Army
- In office 2012–2014
- President: Barack Obama
- Preceded by: Steven J. Morello
- Succeeded by: Alissa Starzak

Member of the U.S. House of Representatives from Oklahoma's 2nd district
- In office January 3, 2001 – January 3, 2005
- Preceded by: Tom Coburn
- Succeeded by: Dan Boren

Personal details
- Born: Brad Rogers Carson; March 11, 1967 (age 59) Winslow, Arizona, U.S.
- Citizenship: American; Cherokee Nation
- Party: Democratic
- Spouse: Julie Carson
- Children: 1
- Education: Baylor University (BA); Trinity College, Oxford (MA); University of Oklahoma (JD)

Brad Rogers Carson (born March 11, 1967) is an American lawyer and politician who was the 21st president of the University of Tulsa from 2021 to 2025. A member of the Democratic Party, he served two terms in the United States House of Representatives from 2001 to 2005.

Carson is the only person to have voted on the authorization of the Iraq War in Congress and to have subsequently fought in it. He served with the 84th EOD Battalion of the US Army in 2008–2009, earning a Bronze Star, and from 2015 to 2016, was the Acting Under Secretary of Defense for Personnel and Readiness, where he initiated a number of notable reforms to modernize civilian and military personnel systems. He served as Under Secretary of the Army from 2014 to 2015 and as General Counsel of the Army from 2012 to 2014.

In April 2021, the University of Tulsa announced Carson had been selected to be the 21st president of the university, effective July 2021. He resigned from the position in May 2025.

In 2024, Carson launched Americans for Responsible Innovation (ARI), a public policy organization focused on artificial intelligence. He currently serves as president of ARI, which is based in Washington, D.C.

== Early life and education ==
Carson was born in Winslow, Arizona to Jack Rogers Carson (1930-2022) and Jimmie Ruth Adair Carson. His father worked for the Bureau of Indian Affairs. During Carson's childhood the family relocated a number of times, resulting in Carson being raised in several different Native American communities, including reservations in Nevada, Arizona, and Kansas, as well as the Eastern Band Cherokee Reserve in North Carolina. As a teenager, Carson moved back to Oklahoma, where his family has roots in the Cherokee Nation, of which Carson is an enrolled member.

Carson studied and graduated at Jenks High School in 1985 and Baylor University in 1989, where he was elected to Phi Beta Kappa. He became the first student at Baylor in 55 years to be awarded a Rhodes Scholarship, an ambition he wanted to fulfill since he was seven years old. As a Rhodes Scholar, Carson went to Trinity College, Oxford, and earned a second BA (which became an MA a few years later) in Politics, Philosophy, and Economics. He attended the University of Oklahoma College of Law, graduating at the top of his class in 1994.

According to The Almanac of American Politics, Carson had originally intended to attend Yale Law School, only to change his mind while at Oxford.

== Career ==
After graduation from the University of Oklahoma, Carson took a job at a prestigious Oklahoma law firm, Crowe & Dunlevy. His firm was awarded the Exceptional Contribution to Legal Services Award by Legal Services of Eastern Oklahoma in 1996, and in 1997, Carson was selected as a White House Fellow, where he was assigned to The Pentagon as a special assistant to the Secretary of Defense.

=== Election to Congress ===
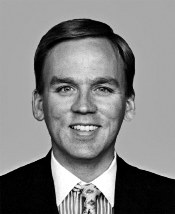
Brad Carson's official photo as a Member of Congress

In 2000, he was elected as a Democrat to the United States House of Representatives from Oklahoma's 2nd Congressional District, located in the northeastern part of the state. In the primary, Carson defeated long-term state representative Bill Settle, who was chairman of the Appropriations Committee in the Oklahoma House of Representatives.

After redistricting changed the political composition of his district to be much more favorable to a Democratic candidate, Carson was reelected in 2002 with nearly 75 percent of the vote.

During his tenure in Congress, Carson was generally seen as a moderate Democrat. He was a member of the conservative Democratic Blue Dog Coalition, and served on the Transportation Committee, the Natural Resources Committee, and the Small Business Committee. On October 10, 2002, Brad Carson was among the 81 House Democrats who voted in favor of authorizing the invasion of Iraq.

=== 2004 U.S. Senate election ===
In 2004, Carson did not seek reelection to the House and ran for the open U.S. Senate seat that was being vacated by retiring Republican Don Nickles. He easily won the Democratic primary, and after a tough campaign, lost the election to Republican Tom Coburn, his predecessor in the House. Despite Carson's loss, election analyst Stuart Rothenberg called the Carson campaign the best-run campaign in the nation in 2004. The Weekly Standard called him "The Perfect Democrat". After the election, Carson wrote an article for The New Republic which was the subject of much discussion. He was succeeded in the House by fellow Democrat Dan Boren.

=== Post-congressional work ===
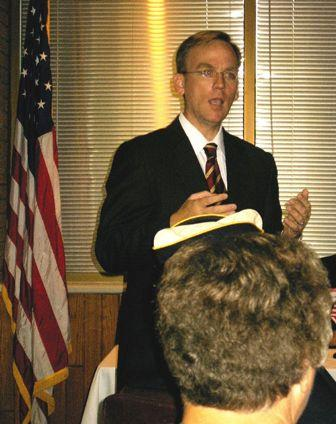
Brad Carson addresses his Veterans Advisory Committee (2004).

After the 2004 Senate election, Carson's term in the United States Congress expired on January 3, 2005; Carson was succeeded by Dan Boren. Carson indicated that he had no immediate plans to seek political office, and, in January 2005, he accepted a semester-long teaching fellowship specializing in U.S. politics at Harvard University. Upon leaving Harvard, he returned to his hometown of Claremore, Oklahoma, and worked as chief executive officer of Cherokee Nation Businesses, which is owned by the Cherokee Nation of Oklahoma in Catoosa, Oklahoma.

As an expert in Indian law, Carson oversaw one of the largest businesses in the state, with thousands of employees, hundreds of millions of dollars in revenue, and more than a dozen in-house lawyers who specialized in Indian and corporate law. In December 2008, Carson left his post at Cherokee Nation Businesses to deploy to Iraq as an intelligence officer in the U.S. Navy. He was officer-in-charge of weapons intelligence teams embedded with the U.S. Army's 84th Explosive Ordnance Disposal Battalion in the nine southern provinces of Iraq; the teams worked with EOD teams at seven bases and investigated bomb sites, caches, smuggling routes, and other activities related to improvised explosive devices. For this work, Carson received, among other awards, the Bronze Star. On his return, he was elected to the board of Cherokee Nation Businesses.

==== University of Tulsa ====
In January 2010, Carson assumed a position as professor of business and law at the University of Tulsa, and as director of the National Energy Policy Institute, a non-profit energy policy organization funded by billionaire George Kaiser's family foundation. In his academic work, Carson has written extensively about the economics of renewable energy. He has also contributed journalism to The Weekly Standard, The New Republic, Blueprint, and Democracy: A Journal of Ideas. In 2010, Carson contributed to a symposium issue of Democracy: A Journal of Ideas, in which he was one of ten writers (including Martha Nussbaum, Michael Sandel, and others) discussing the future of progressive political thought and politics. He is the author of several other works, including a guide to federal appellate practice, a work co-authored with judge Robert Bacharach (who was appointed by President Obama to the 10th Circuit Court of Appeals). More recently, he has been working on a long series of articles about military reform for the online journal War on the Rocks.

==== Work with Barack Obama ====
Carson had met Barack Obama in 2004 when they were both nominees of the Democratic Party for open seats in the United States Senate. Carson endorsed Obama in 2006 for the 2008 presidential election. Carson served as Obama's personal representative in the approval of candidates for delegates from Oklahoma to the 2008 Democratic National Convention. Oklahoma was the first state to name its complete delegation to the 2008 Democratic Convention.

=== Obama administration ===
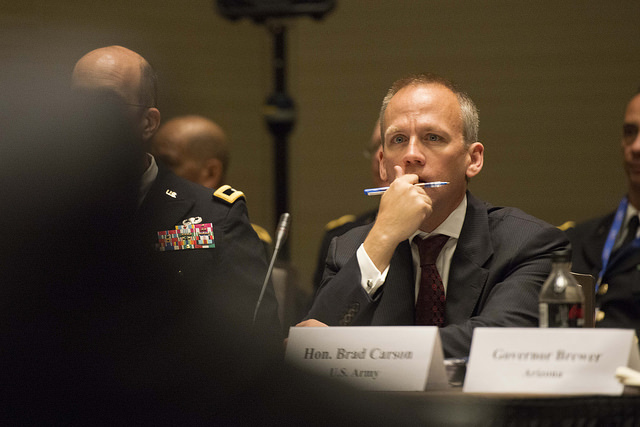
Under Secretary of the Army, Brad Carson

On September 14, 2011, President Barack Obama nominated Carson to serve as the General Counsel of the United States Department of the Army. The United States Senate confirmed Carson by unanimous consent on December 17, 2011.

On January 6, 2014, President Obama nominated Carson to be Under Secretary of the Army, to replace Joseph W. Westphal, whom the president had nominated to be the United States Ambassador to Saudi Arabia. On February 12, 2014, Carson was confirmed by the United States Senate and he was sworn in as the 31st Under Secretary of the Army on March 27, 2014. Fellow Oklahoma Democrat, Principal Chief Bill John Baker of the Cherokee nation, praised Carson, saying, "I applaud President Obama for nominating Brad Carson to this post [...] Brad is a Cherokee citizen and has committed his life to one of our Cherokee values: serving people. As a U.S. Congressman he served the people of Oklahoma's second district, as a CEO he served Cherokee Nation Businesses and the Cherokee people [...] he will be a champion for our American military in his role as Army undersecretary."

As chief operating officer of the Department of the Army, Carson led day-to-day-business operations of the global U.S. Army business enterprise, with over 490,000 active-duty soldiers, 335,000 National Guard soldiers, 200,000 Army Reserve soldiers, and over 330,000 civilians. He supervised the development and submission of the Army's budget, which exceeded $150 billion. In a move lauded by veterans groups, Carson made national headlines when he formally apologized to veterans of the Iraq War for the Army's mishandling of chemical weapons exposures.

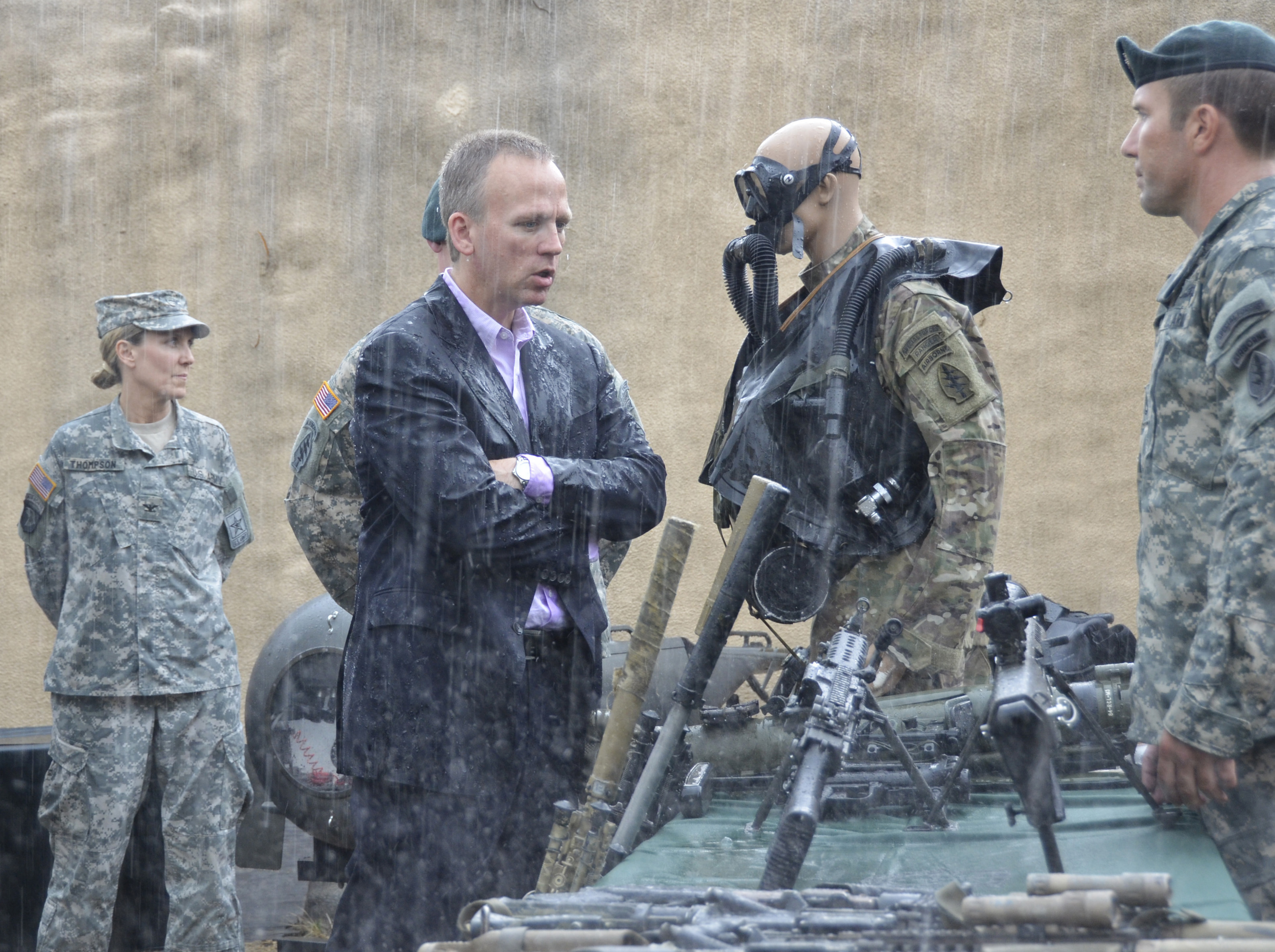
Carson visiting with Green Berets at Fort Bragg

Carson served as the acting undersecretary of defense for personnel and readiness from April 2015 until April 2016, resigning while still awaiting Senate formal approval. As undersecretary, Carson led a number of pioneering initiatives such as the Department of Defense's "Force of the Future" reforms, which included updating the recruitment, development, and management systems of the military and civilian workforce, the largest personnel change in nearly 50 years.

From 2017 to 2021, Carson taught courses related to national security and public sector innovation at the University of Virginia's Frank Batten School of Leadership and Public Policy.

=== The University of Tulsa president ===
Carson was sworn in as president of the University of Tulsa in July 2021. He succeeded Gerard Clancy, who left office after a vote of no-confidence. In July 2023, Carson was president when the university launched a new Honors College, focusing on literature and philosophy. During Carson's tenure in 2022, the university had more National Merit Scholars per capita than other university in the nation. In 2023, Carson pushed for the organizing of more concerts at Chapman Stadium, seeing the university hold the first major concert in the venue since 1990 with the performance of Def Leppard, Mötley Crüe, and Alice Cooper. He also expanded the university's programs in Tulsa's arts district and led the university in taking over organizing responsibilities for Tulsa's Mayfest.

In 2023, TU was recognized as a "free speech" university and was the first university in Oklahoma to receive a "green light" rating by the Foundation for Individual Rights and Expression. This recognition was given after the Foundation for Individual Rights and Expression aided Carson in revising the university's policies on speech and assembly.

In May 2025, Carson announced he would leave the University of Tulsa to focus on his artificial intelligence nonprofit, effective May 31.

=== Artificial intelligence ===
In 2024, Carson and tech entrepreneur Eric Gastfriend co-founded Americans for Responsible Innovation, an advocacy group that calls for regulations on artificial intelligence. In 2025, he created the super PAC network Public First, along with former Republican member of Congress Chris Stewart. The super PACs seek to counter Leading the Future, an industry-aligned group that opposes AI regulations.. In February 2026, Anthropic said that it would donate $20 million to the aligned advocacy group Public First Action.

== Personal life ==
Carson's wife, Julie, served on the Oklahoma State Regents for Higher Education. They live in Claremore, Oklahoma. They have one son. In 2017, Carson completed the Marathon des Sables, a 250-km ultramarathon in the Sahara Desert often called the world's toughest footrace. In 2018, he completed the Jungle Ultra, a similar race through the Amazon jungle.

== Electoral history ==
Oklahoma's 2nd congressional district: Results 2000–2002
Year	Democratic	Votes	Pct	Republican	Votes	Pct	3rd Party	Party	Votes	Pct
2000	Brad Carson	107,273	55%	Andy Ewing	81,672	42%	Neil Mavis	Libertarian	6,467	3%
2002	Brad Carson	146,748	74%	Kent Pharaoh	51,234	26%				

Oklahoma Senator (Class III) results: 2004
Year	Democratic	Votes	Pct	Republican	Votes	Pct	3rd Party	Party	Votes	Pct
2004	Brad Carson	596,750	41%	Tom Coburn	763,433	53%	Sheila Bilyeu	Independent	86,663	6%

== See also ==
- List of Native Americans in the United States Congress

U.S. House of Representatives
Preceded by Tom Coburn	Member of the U.S. House of Representatives from Oklahoma's 2nd congressional district 2001–2005	Succeeded by Dan Boren
Party political offices
Preceded by Don Carroll	Democratic nominee for U.S. Senator from Oklahoma (Class 3); 2004	Succeeded by Jim Rogers
Political offices
Preceded by Joseph W. Westphal	United States Under Secretary of the Army; 2014–2015	Succeeded by Eric Fanning; Acting
Preceded by Jessica Wright	Under Secretary of Defense for Personnel and Readiness; Acting; 2015–2016	Succeeded by Peter Levine; Acting
U.S. order of precedence (ceremonial)
Preceded by Larry LaRocco as Former U.S. Representative	Order of precedence of the United States as Former U.S. Representative	Succeeded by Jim Bridenstine as Former U.S. Representative
