= Executive Order 14179 =

2025 executive order signed by Trump

- Removing Barriers to American Leadership in Artificial Intelligence
- Front page of Executive Order 14179
- Type: Executive order
- Number: 14179
- President: Donald Trump
- Signed: January 23, 2025

Federal Register details
- Federal Register document number: 2025-02172
- Publication date: January 23, 2025

Summary
- The executive order seeks to enhance U.S. leadership in AI by revoking certain policies and establishing a plan to promote AI development.

Executive Order 14179, titled "Removing Barriers to American Leadership in Artificial Intelligence", is an executive order signed by Donald Trump, the 47th President of the United States, on January 23, 2025. The executive order aims to initiate the process of strengthening U.S. leadership in artificial intelligence, promote AI development free from ideological bias or social agendas, establish an action plan to maintain global AI dominance, and to revise or rescind policies that conflict with these goals.

== Background ==
=== Joe Biden ===
This executive order comes in response to the Executive Order 14110 titled Executive Order on Safe, Secure, and Trustworthy Development and Use of Artificial Intelligence (sometimes referred to as "Executive Order on Artificial Intelligence") signed by Joe Biden on October 30, 2023.

=== Donald Trump ===
Donald Trump rescinded Executive Order 14110 on his first day in office with the Initial Rescissions of Harmful Executive Orders and Actions executive order. On January 23, 2025, Trump signed the Removing Barriers to American Leadership in Artificial Intelligence executive order as the replacement executive order covering the development of artificial intelligence technologies.

== Provisions ==
- It revokes existing AI policies and directives that are seen as barriers to U.S. AI innovation.
- It mandates the creation of an action plan within 180 days to sustain U.S. AI leadership, focusing on human flourishing, economic competitiveness, and national security.
- It requires the review of policies, directives, and regulations related to Executive Order 14110 (from October 2023) to identify actions that may conflict with the new policy goals.
- Agencies are instructed to suspend, revise, or rescind actions from the previous executive order that may be inconsistent with the new policy.
- The Office of Management and Budget (OMB) must revise certain memoranda (M-24-10 and M-24-18) within 60 days to align with the new policy.
- The order specifies that it does not create new enforceable rights or benefits and should be implemented within the boundaries of existing law and appropriations.

== Implementation ==
The NITRD program, on behalf of the Office of Science and Technology Policy (OSTP), requested public input on the development of an AI Action Plan by March 15.

== Reactions ==
Over 10,000 public comments were submitted in response to the OSTP request for public input.

OpenAI submitted comments proposing a five-point strategy focused on regulatory preemption, export controls, copyright protections, infrastructure investment, and government adoption to ensure AI innovation, promote democratic AI globally, and protect national security. They emphasized the ability to learn from copyrighted material to maintain America's lead against China's state-controlled AI efforts like DeepSeek.

Google submitted comments advocating for a three-pronged plan that invests in domestic AI development through energy infrastructure reform, balanced export controls, continued research funding, and coherent federal policies, while modernizing government AI adoption and promoting innovation-friendly approaches internationally.

Both OpenAI and Google urged White House opposition to foreign copyright and transparency obligations, for example in the UK Government's preferred option in their Copyright and AI consultation.

== See also ==
- A National Policy Framework for Artificial Intelligence
- List of executive orders in the first presidency of Donald Trump
- List of executive actions by Joe Biden
- List of executive orders in the second presidency of Donald Trump
- Artificial intelligence
- Generative artificial intelligence
