= Utah Artificial Intelligence Policy Act =

Utah AI Policy Act

Utah State Legislature
- Long title: Artificial Intelligence Policy Act
- Citation: SB 149
- Signed by: Governor Spencer Cox

The Utah Artificial Intelligence Policy Act (SB-149) was signed into law in Utah in 2024 and amended in 2025. The first state law in the United States specifically regulating generative AI, it went into effect on May 1, 2024. The law requires companies to disclose if their customers interact with AI instead of a human. It also established an Office of Artificial Intelligence Policy.

Amendments to the Act went into effect on May 7, 2025. While the 2024 Act requires companies to disclose generative AI use when asked by customers, the amendments introduced stricter requirements for higher-risk interactions. SB 226 mandates disclosure of AI use in high-risk interactions involving health, financial, and biometric data, or when providing consumers with advice on financial, legal, or healthcare matters.

== See also ==
- Regulation of artificial intelligence in the United States
