= 2000 United States House of Representatives elections in Oklahoma =

- November 7, 2000

All 6 Oklahoma seats to the United States House of Representatives
	Majority party	Minority party
Party	Republican	Democratic
Last election	6	0
Seats won	5	1
Seat change	▼1	▲1
Popular vote	701,820	336,955
Percentage	64.53%	30.98%
Swing	▲1.85%	▼5.63%

Republican
50–60%
60–70%
70–80%
80–90%
≥90%
Democratic
40–50%
50–60%
60–70%

The 2000 United States House of Representatives elections in Oklahoma were held on November 7, 2000, to elect the six U.S. representatives from the state of Oklahoma, one from each of the state's six congressional districts. The elections coincided with the 2000 U.S. presidential election, as well as other elections to the House of Representatives, elections to the United States Senate and various state and local elections.

== Overview ==
District	Republican		Democratic		Others		Total		Result
District	Votes	%	Votes	%	Votes	%	Votes	%	Result
District 1	138,528	69.26%	58,493	29.25%	2,984	1.49%	200,005	100.0%	Republican hold
District 2	81,672	41.79%	107,273	54.90%	6,467	3.31%	195,412	100.0%	Democratic gain
District 3	137,826	86.57%	0	0.00%	21,390	13.43%	159,216	100.0%	Republican hold
District 4	114,000	64.89%	54,808	31.20%	6,876	3.91%	175,684	100.0%	Republican hold
District 5	134,159	68.44%	53,275	27.18%	8,588	4.38%	196,022	100.0%	Republican hold
District 6	95,635	59.34%	63,106	39.15%	2,435	1.51%	161,176	100.0%	Republican hold
Total	701,820	64.53%	336,955	30.98%	48,740	4.48%	1,087,515	100.0%	

Popular vote
Republican	64.53%
Democratic	30.98%
Other	4.48%

House seats
Republican	83.33%
Democratic	16.67%

== District 1 ==
2000 Oklahoma's 1st congressional district election
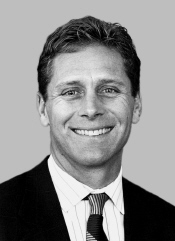

Nominee	Steve Largent	Dan Lowe
Party	Republican	Democratic
Popular vote	138,528	58,493
Percentage	69.3%	29.3%
- County results Largent: 60–70% 70–80%
U.S. Representative before election
Steve Largent
Republican
Elected U.S. Representative
Steve Largent
Republican

Precinct and county-level results

The 1st congressional district encompassed the entirety of Tulsa County as well as western Wagoner County. This included the city of Tulsa and all of the Tulsa County suburbs in addition to Broken Arrow and vicinity. Steve Largent won reelection to a fourth term in office with 69.3% of the vote.

Oklahoma's 1st congressional district, 2000
Party	Candidate	Votes	%
Republican	Steve Largent (incumbent)	138,528	69.3
Democratic	Dan Lowe	58,493	29.3
Libertarian	Michael A. Clem	2,984	1.5
Total votes		200,005	100.0
Republican hold			

== District 2 ==
2000 Oklahoma's 2nd congressional district election
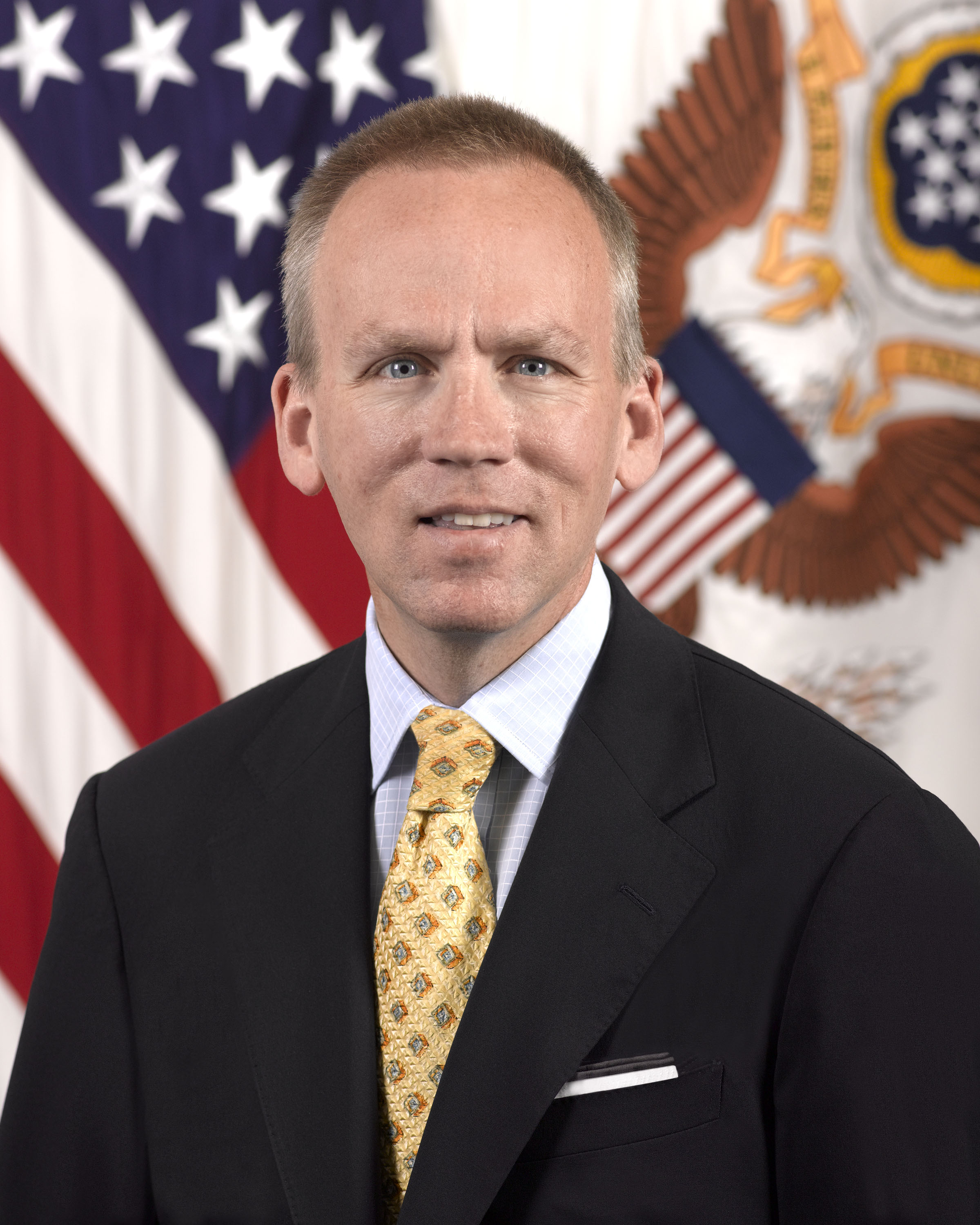

Nominee	Brad Carson	Andy Ewing
Party	Democratic	Republican
Popular vote	107,273	81,672
Percentage	54.9%	41.8%
- County results Carson: 40–50% 50–60% 60–70% Ewing: 50–60%
U.S. Representative before election
Tom Coburn
Republican
Elected U.S. Representative
Brad Carson
Democratic

Precinct and county-level results

The 2nd congressional district encompassed most of northeastern Oklahoma with the exception of northern Osage County, Tulsa County, Wagoner County, and Washington County. Outgoing Republican Representative Tom Coburn was replaced by Democrat Brad Carson, who won 54.9% of the vote.

=== General election ===
==== Polling ====
Poll source	Date(s)	Sample size	Margin of error	Andy Ewing (R)	Brad Carson (D)	Other / undecided (Note: Calculated by taking the difference of 100% and all other candidates combined.)
Consumer Logic	October 24, 2000	600	—	29%	44%	27%

==== Results ====
Oklahoma's 2nd congressional district, 2000
Party	Candidate	Votes	%
Democratic	Brad Carson	107,273	54.9
Republican	Andy Ewing	81,672	41.8
Libertarian	Neil Mavis	6,467	3.3
Total votes		195,412	100.0
Democratic gain from Republican			

== District 3 ==
2000 Oklahoma's 3rd congressional district election
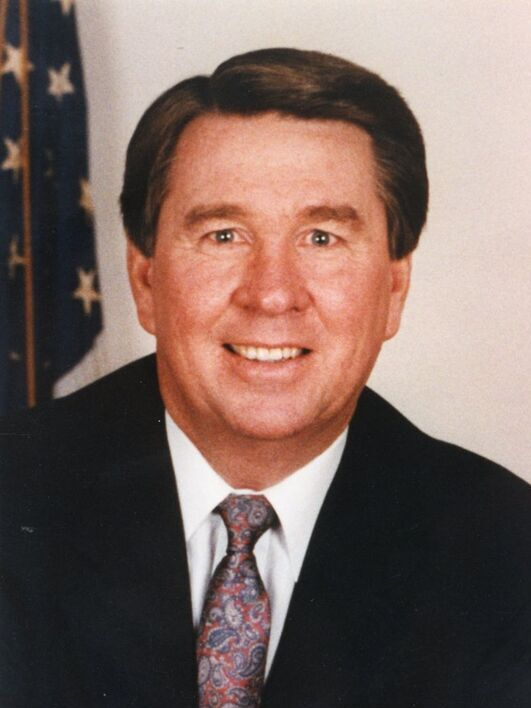

Nominee	Wes Watkins	Argus W. Yandell, Jr.
Party	Republican	Independent
Popular vote	137,826	14,660
Percentage	86.6%	9.2%
- County results Watkins: 70–80% 80–90%
U.S. Representative before election
Wes Watkins
Republican
Elected U.S. Representative
Wes Watkins
Republican

Precinct and county-level results

The 3rd congressional district encompassed most of southeastern Oklahoma in addition to a tendril of counties extending from Seminole County to most of Pawnee County. Incumbent Republican Wes Watkins won election to a 13th term in office with 86.6% of the vote. The seat was uncontested by the Democratic Party this cycle.

Oklahoma's 3rd congressional district, 2000
Party	Candidate	Votes	%
Republican	Wes Watkins (incumbent)	137,826	86.6
Independent	Argus W. Yandell, Jr. (Note: Yandell was supported by the Southern Party.)	14,660	9.2
Libertarian	R.C. Sevier White	6,730	4.2
Total votes		159,216	100.0
Republican hold			

== District 4 ==
2000 Oklahoma's 4th congressional district election
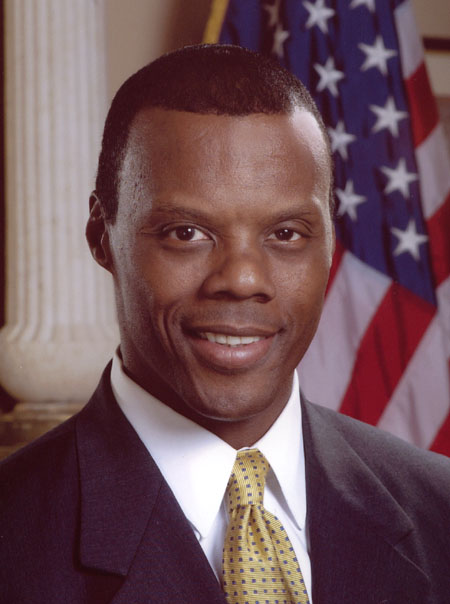

Nominee	J.C. Watts	Larry Weatherford
Party	Republican	Democratic
Popular vote	114,000	54,808
Percentage	64.9%	31.2%
- County results Watts: 50–60% 60–70%
U.S. Representative before election
J.C. Watts
Republican
Elected U.S. Representative
J.C. Watts
Republican

Precinct and county-level results

The 4th congressional district encompassed an area extending from the southern Oklahoma City metropolitan area to southwestern Oklahoma. Incumbent Republican J.C. Watts won reelection with 64.9% of the vote, securing a fourth term in office.

Oklahoma's 4th congressional district, 2000
Party	Candidate	Votes	%
Republican	J.C. Watts (incumbent)	114,000	64.9
Democratic	Larry Weatherford	54,808	31.2
Reform	Susan Ducey	4,897	2.8
Libertarian	Keith B. Johnson	1,979	1.1
Total votes		175,684	100.0
Republican hold			

== District 5 ==
2000 Oklahoma's 5th congressional district election
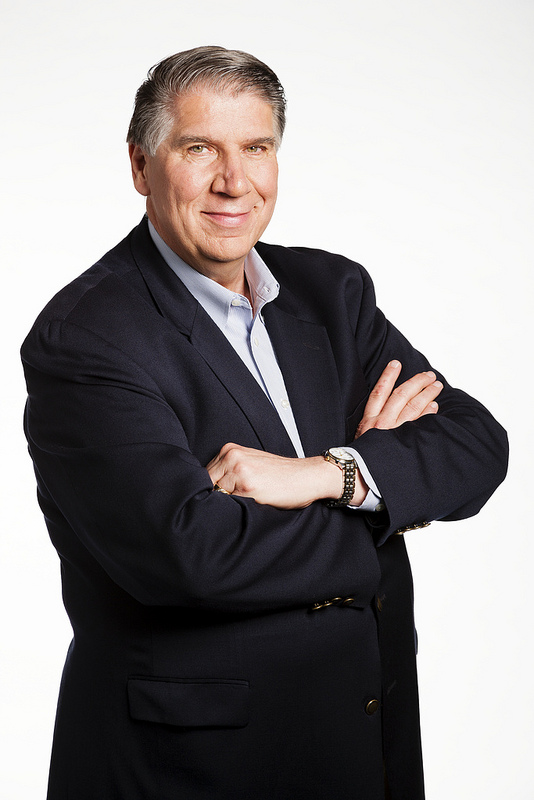

Nominee	Ernest Istook	Garland McWatters
Party	Republican	Democratic
Popular vote	134,159	53,275
Percentage	68.4%	27.2%
- County results Istook: 50–60% 60–70% 70–80%
U.S. Representative before election
Ernest Istook
Republican
Elected U.S. Representative
Ernest Istook
Republican

Precinct and county-level results

The 5th congressional district encompassed an area containing the western Canadian County, western, northern, and eastern Oklahoma County, and a line of counties extending from the northern Oklahoma City suburbs to the northern border and from there to Washington County, including Bartlesville. Incumbent Republican Ernest Istook won reelection with 68.4% of the vote, securing a fifth term in office.

Oklahoma's 5th congressional district, 2000
Party	Candidate	Votes	%
Republican	Ernest Istook (incumbent)	134,159	68.4
Democratic	Garland McWatters	53,275	27.2
Independent	Bill Maguire	5,930	3.0
Libertarian	Robert T. Murphy	2,658	1.4
Total votes		196,022	100.0
Republican hold			

== District 6 ==
2000 Oklahoma's 6th congressional district election
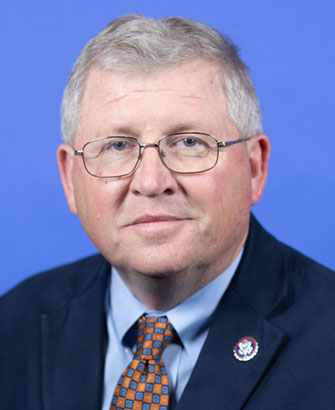

Nominee	Frank Lucas	Randy Beutler
Party	Republican	Democratic
Popular vote	95,635	63,106
Percentage	59.3%	39.2%
- County results Lucas: 50–60% 60–70% 70–80% 80–90% Beutler: 50–60% 60–70%
U.S. Representative before election
Frank Lucas
Republican
Elected U.S. Representative
Frank Lucas
Republican

Precinct and county-level results

The 6th congressional district broadly encompassed most of western Oklahoma in addition to a Democratic-leaning portion of interior Oklahoma County. Incumbent Republican Frank Lucas won reelection with 59.3% of the vote, winning a fourth term in office.

Oklahoma's 6th congressional district, 2000
Party	Candidate	Votes	%
Republican	Frank Lucas (incumbent)	95,635	59.3
Democratic	Randy Beutler	63,106	39.2
Libertarian	Joseph V. Cristiano	2,435	1.5
Total votes		161,176	100.0
Republican hold			
