= Public First Action =

American AI policy group

- Formation: 2025
- Type: 501(c)(4)
- Region served: United States
- Key people: Brad Carson; Chris Stewart
- Affiliations: Defending Our Values; Jobs and Democracy
- Website: publicfirstaction.us

Public First Action is a 501(c)(4) nonprofit organization focused on United States public policy related to artificial intelligence. Public First Action is a bipartisan group that advocates for AI transparency, safeguards, and export controls on advanced AI chips. The organization is aligned with the political action committees Jobs and Democracy to support Democratic candidates, Defending Our Values to support Republican candidates, and Public First.

== History ==
Public First Action was formed in 2025 by former Congressmen Brad Carson, a Democrat, and Chris Stewart, a Republican, to advocate for federal, state, and local regulations related to AI. The group's formation followed the founding of a super PAC network, Leading the Future, which advocates for deregulation of the AI industry and faster development of the new technology. Public First Action supports measures that would increase transparency at frontier AI companies and impose export controls on advanced AI chips, in addition to opposing the preemption of state-level AI laws.

In February 2026, the 501(c)(4) organization Public First Action received $20 million from the AI company Anthropic. The company later clarified that the donation could not be used for election ads.

That same month, the group announced plans to support 30 to 50 Democrats and Republicans in state and federal races, with Public First Action and aligned super PACs launching advertisements in Nebraska, Tennessee, and other states. In one ad, Senator Marsha Blackburn was touted for her work on child online safety.

As of October 2026, the organization spent $23.33 million in primary elections and $1.1 million in general elections during the 2026 United States elections. For Democratic candidates, it spent $3.5 million in support of Scott Wiener, $263,000 in support of Bob Brooks, $399,000 in support of Colin Allred, $512,000 in support of Brian Poindexter, $1.62 million in support of Valerie Foushee, $13.16 million in support of Alex Bores. For Republican candidates, it spent $98,000 against Briscoe Cain, $262,000 in support of Pete Ricketts, $501,000 in support of John Cowan, $646,000 in support of Alex Mealer, $740,000 against Dan Franzese, $808,000 in support of Kevin Hern, $857,000 in support of Scott Singer, $959,000 in support of Rhett Marques, $998,000 in support of Celeste Maloy, and $1.49 million in support of Carlos De La Cruz.

== Organization ==
=== Leadership and funding ===
Public First Action is led by Carson and Stewart. The group has raised nearly $50 million in funding with a goal of raising $75 million during the 2026 midterms. Anthropic CEO Dario Amodei donated $1 million and Anthropic has contributed $20 million to the group.

=== Structure ===
Public First Action is aligned with three political action committees: "Jobs and Democracy", which supports Democratic candidates; "Defending Our Values", which supports Republican candidates; and "Public First", which supports both Republicans and Democrats.

== See also ==
- Regulation of artificial intelligence in the United States
