= Leading the Future =

American pro-artificial intelligence lobby group

- Formation: August 15, 2025; 14 months ago
- Type: Super PAC
- Registration no.: C00916114
- Headquarters: Henderson, Nevada
- Region served: United States
- Key people: Zac Moffatt; Josh Vlasto
- Affiliations: American Mission; Build American AI; Think Big
- Website: www.leadingthefuture.com

Leading the Future (LTF) is an American super PAC network focused on lobbying for policies friendly to the artificial intelligence industry. It launched in 2025 and received over $140 million from industry stakeholders including Andreessen Horowitz, OpenAI President Greg Brockman and Palantir co-founder Joe Lonsdale. It operates the American Mission PAC in Republican primaries, the Think Big PAC in Democratic primaries, and the offshoot Build American AI.

== History ==
=== Founding ===
Leading the Future launched in August 2025 and received over $140 million from industry stakeholders including Andreessen Horowitz, OpenAI President Greg Brockman and Palantir co-founder Joe Lonsdale. The launch was preceded by talks between Collin McCune, head of government affairs at Andreessen Horowitz, and Chris Lehane, chief global affairs officer at OpenAI. Lehane had also advised Brockman on his political spending, which Brockman described as being in service of OpenAI's mission. NBC News states that LTF's efforts are modeled after the pro-cryptocurrency group Fairshake, which Chris Lehane had previously helped launch.

LTF is led by Zac Moffatt and Josh Vlasto, the latter of whom previously served as the chief spokesperson for Fairshake. Vlasto worked as a press secretary to Chuck Schumer in the mid-2000s, and from 2011 to 2014 he served as chief of staff in Andrew Cuomo's governor's office. He also advised Cuomo during the 2020 sexual harassment allegations.

Moffatt worked on Michael Bloomberg's 2001 New York City mayoral campaign and later at the RNC. In 2009, he founded the digital strategy firm Targeted Victory. He also worked on Mitt Romney's 2012 presidential campaign. Stagwell took a controlling stake in Targeted Victory in 2018, and in 2025 Moffatt became Stagwell's global chair of communications and advocacy.

LTF is affiliated with the nonprofit Build American AI, which Axios describes as a dark money advocacy "offshoot" operating alongside the super PAC. Build American AI is led by Nathan Leamer.

In response to the creation of LTF, former members of Congress Brad Carson and Chris Stewart co-founded the super PAC network Public First, aiming to counter the group's influence.

=== 2026 elections ===
In April 2026, an investigation by Model Republic linked Leading the Future to The Wire By Acutus, an automated news website that allegedly used AI agents posing as human journalists to solicit interviews. The site's content was found to closely mirror the PAC's deregulatory policy goals while targeting researchers and advocates skeptical of rapid AI development.

In May 2026, Wired revealed that Build American AI used a "dark money" campaign to pay TikTok and Instagram influencers $5,000 per video to promote scripted narratives framing Chinese AI as a "national security threat." According to internal documents and staff at the marketing agency managing the project, the campaign's explicit goal was to "subtly shift public debate" toward the deregulation of AI industries while intentionally avoiding technical discussions regarding AI quality or safety.

In June 2026, The Midas Project reported on a series of sock puppet accounts that were connected to Build American AI. One of the accounts, "@JonathanDoomer", presented as a genuine AI critic posting content that expressed pro-China views and anti-innovation views as well as memes promoting violence to stop the spread of AI. Politico later characterized the account as a "strawman for the arguments LTF felt the other side was making". In response to the reporting from The Midas Project, Build American AI said that the accounts were not a "core part of their strategy".

During the 2026 primary season, LTF endorsed several candidates in both Democratic and Republican races. As of October 26, 2026, it spent $27.38 million on primary election campaigns and $7.4 million on general election campaigns in 2026. For Democratic candidates, it spent $265,000 in support of Greg Stanton, $288,000 in support of Marilyn Strickland, $289,000 in support of Yvette Clarke, $292,000 in support of Val Hoyle, $294,000 in support of Jeremy Moss, $309,000 in support of Jared Moskowitz, $571,000 in support of Joseph Morelle, $599,000 in support of Jimmy Panetta, $638,000 in support of Rob Menendez, $705,000 in support of Dan Koh, $1.11 million in support of Richie Torres, $1.13 million in support of Ben McAdams, $1.14 million in support of Melissa Bean, $1.43 million in support of Jesse Jackson Jr., and $8.16 million against Alex Bores. For Republican candidates, it spent $103,000 in support of Chris McGowan, $129,000 in support of Jace Yarbrough, $259,000 in support of Jay Obernolte, $281,000 in support of Houston Gaines, $286,000 in support of Kurt Alme, $287,000 in support of Johnny Garrett, $330,000 in support of Barry Moore, $333,000 in support of Harriet Hageman, $374,000 in support of Lindsey Graham, $473,000 in support of Kevin Hern, $509,000 in support of Laurie Buckhout, $511,000 in support of Jessica Steinmann, $578,000 in support of Tom Sell, $590,000 in support of Aaron Flint, $616,000 in support of Jay Feely, $667,000 in support of Julia Letlow, $676,000 in support of Andy Barr, $686,000 in support of Clay Fuller, $747,000 in support of Chris Gober, $779,000 in support of Amanda McKinney, and $960,000 in support of Jim Kingston. It also endorsed the campaigns of Mike Rounds, Emilia Sykes, Josh Gottheimer, Sam Liccardo, Suhas Subramanyam, and Jimmy Gomez.

== Operations and funding ==
Leading the Future operates the American Mission PAC in Republican primaries, the Think Big PAC in Democratic primaries, and the offshoot Build American AI. American Mission is affiliated with the shell corporation Summit Ridge Media Group and Think Big is affiliated with the shell corporation Lantern Production Consultants.

=== Funding ===
During its launch in August 2025, LTF received over $140 million from industry stakeholders including Andreessen Horowitz, OpenAI President Greg Brockman and Palantir co-founder Joe Lonsdale.

In May 2026, the Campaign Legal Center filed a complaint with the Federal Election Commission alleging that super PACs associated with LTF evaded federal transparency requirements by funneling payments through shell companies. Contributions to LTF in 2026 include $50 million from Ben Horowitz and Marc Andreessen and $25 million from Greg and Anna Brockman.

== See also ==
- Regulation of artificial intelligence in the United States
