= National Security Memorandum on Artificial Intelligence =

2024 White House memorandum on AI and national security

- Memorandum on Advancing the United States’ Leadership in Artificial Intelligence; Harnessing Artificial Intelligence to Fulfill National Security Objectives; and Fostering the Safety, Security, and Trustworthiness of Artificial Intelligence

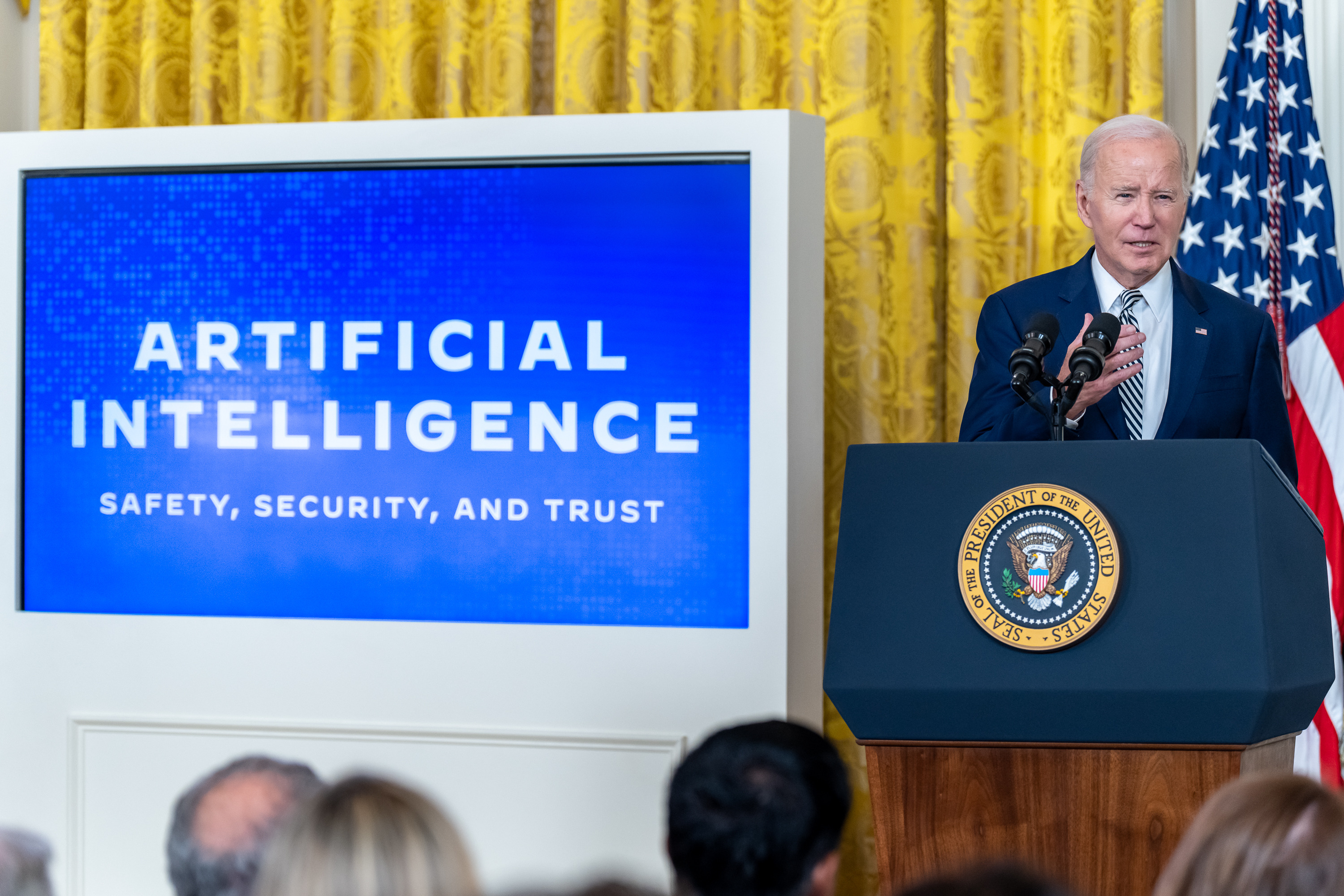
- Joe Biden delivers remarks regarding artificial intelligence.
- Type: Presidential memorandum
- President: Joe Biden
- Signed: October 24, 2024

The Memorandum on Advancing the United States' Leadership in Artificial Intelligence; Harnessing Artificial Intelligence to Fulfill National Security Objectives; and Fostering the Safety, Security, and Trustworthiness of Artificial Intelligence is a memorandum signed by U.S. president Joe Biden. The memorandum is described as seeking to advance U.S. leadership in the development of safe, secure, and trustworthy artificial intelligence (AI); enable the U.S. government to use AI for national security; and contribute to international AI governance.

== See also ==
- Executive Order 14110 – American presidential directive
- National security – Security and defence of a nation state
- Regulation of AI in the United States
