= Americans for Responsible Innovation =

Advocacy organization related to AI

Americans for Responsible Innovation (ARI) is a U.S.-based nonprofit organization focused on governance related to artificial intelligence. ARI advocates for federal AI policies that protect the public while maintaining America's competitive advantage in AI research and development. The group works with lawmakers, national security experts, civil society organizations, and technology industry associations to advance bipartisan legislation.

== Leadership ==
ARI's president is Brad Carson, a former U.S. congressman and Department of Defense official. Technology entrepreneur Eric Gastfriend is the group's executive director. Carson and Gastfriend co-founded ARI.

== History ==
ARI was launched by Carson and Gastfriend in March 2024. The group was founded to be nonpartisan and independent from the technology industry. That same year, ARI advocated for more funding and modernization at the Department of Commerce.

In 2024, ARI backed the Future of AI Innovation Act and CREATE AI Act, supporting AI progress with safeguards. The group also supported the TAKE IT DOWN Act, requiring social media platforms to take down non-consensual deepfakes and intimate images following user requests. The TAKE IT DOWN Act passed in April 2025.

In 2025, ARI played a role in defeating federal preemption proposals that aimed to block state-level AI laws. The group launched a website collecting anti-preemption statements from national figures, hosted a press conference with state lawmakers, and led grassroots petition efforts to stop a moratorium on state AI laws from passing Congress.

ARI is a supporter of export controls on advanced AI chips. In September 2025, an ARI spokesperson said the GAIN AI Act would “take back some control over what technology we’re exporting to China."

ARI has published research on AI's emerging impact on the workforce and has supported legislation including the AI Workforce PREPARE Act and the Economy of the Future Commission Act to mitigate AI-related workforce disruptions. In September 2025, ARI organized a letter signed by 40 economists, advocating for the federal government to collect more data concerning AI's impact on the workforce.
