= Executive Order 14110 =

American presidential directive

- Safe, Secure, and Trustworthy Development and Use of Artificial Intelligence

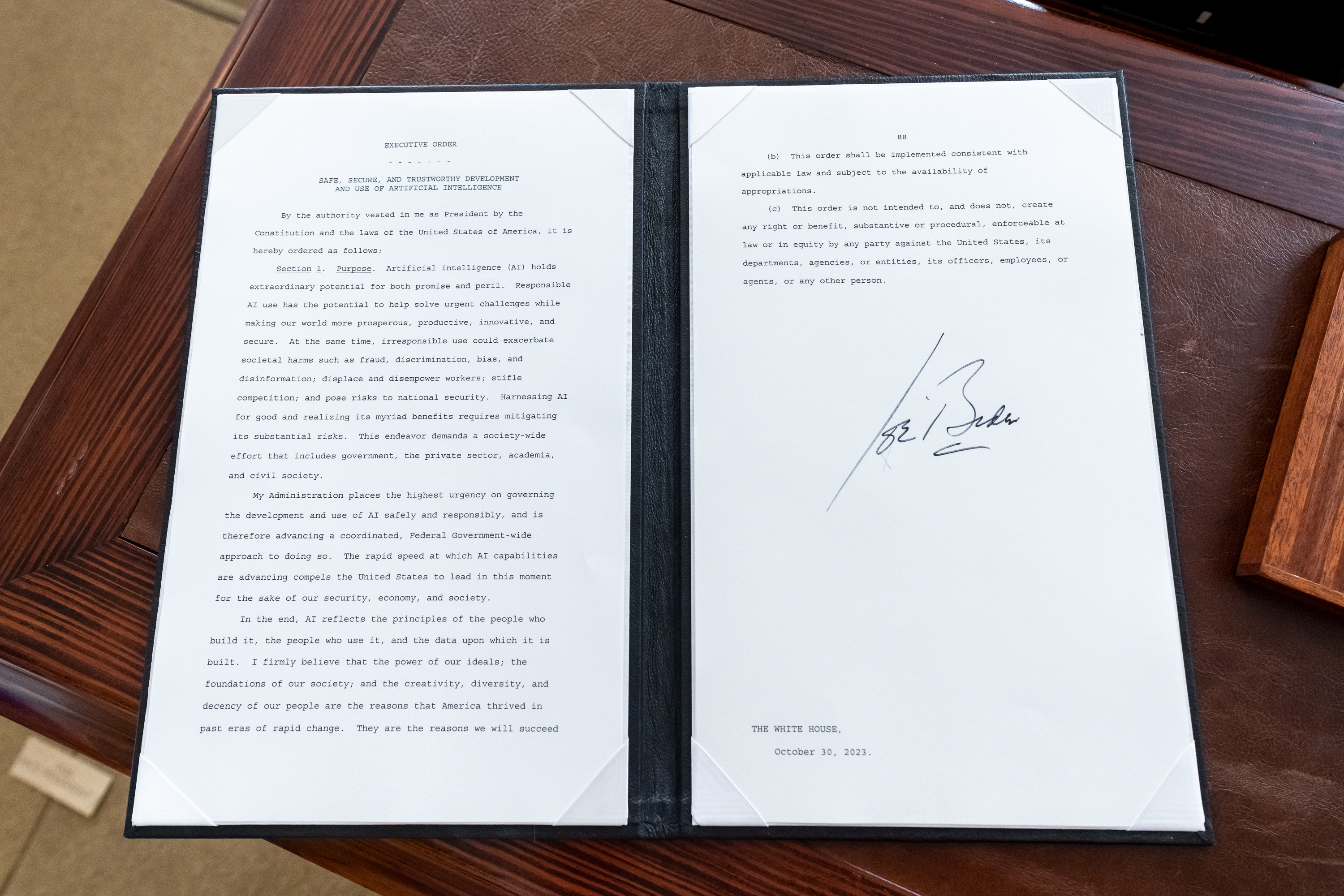
- Signed Executive Order 14110 in the East Room of the White House
- Type: Executive order
- Number: 14110
- President: Joe Biden
- Signed: October 30, 2023

Federal Register details
- Federal Register document number: 2023-24283
- Publication date: fP

Summary
- Creates a national approach to governing artificial intelligence.

Executive Order 14110, titled Executive Order on Safe, Secure, and Trustworthy Development and Use of Artificial Intelligence (sometimes referred to as "Executive Order on Artificial Intelligence") was the 126th executive order signed by then U.S. president Joe Biden. Signed on October 30, 2023, the order defines the administration's policy goals regarding artificial intelligence (AI), and orders executive agencies to take actions pursuant to these goals. The order is considered to be the most comprehensive piece of governance by the United States regarding AI. It was rescinded by U.S. president Donald Trump within hours of his assuming office on January 20, 2025.

Policy goals outlined in the executive order pertain to promoting competition in the AI industry, preventing AI-enabled threats to civil liberties and national security, and ensuring U.S. global competitiveness in the AI field. The executive order required a number of major federal agencies to create dedicated "chief artificial intelligence officer" positions within their organizations.

== Background ==
The drafting of the order was motivated by the rapid pace of development in generative AI models in the 2020s, including the release of large language model ChatGPT. Executive Order 14110 is the third executive order dealing explicitly with AI, with two AI-related executive orders being signed by then-President Donald Trump.

The development of AI models without policy safeguards has raised a variety of concerns among experts and commentators. These range from future existential risk from advanced AI models to immediate concerns surrounding current technologies' ability to disseminate misinformation, enable discrimination, and undermine national security.

In August 2023, Arati Prabhakar, the director of the Office of Science and Technology Policy, indicated that the White House was expediting its work on executive action on AI. A week prior to the executive order's unveiling, Prabhakar indicated that Office of Management and Budget (OMB) guidance on the order would be released "soon" after.

== Policy goals and provisions ==
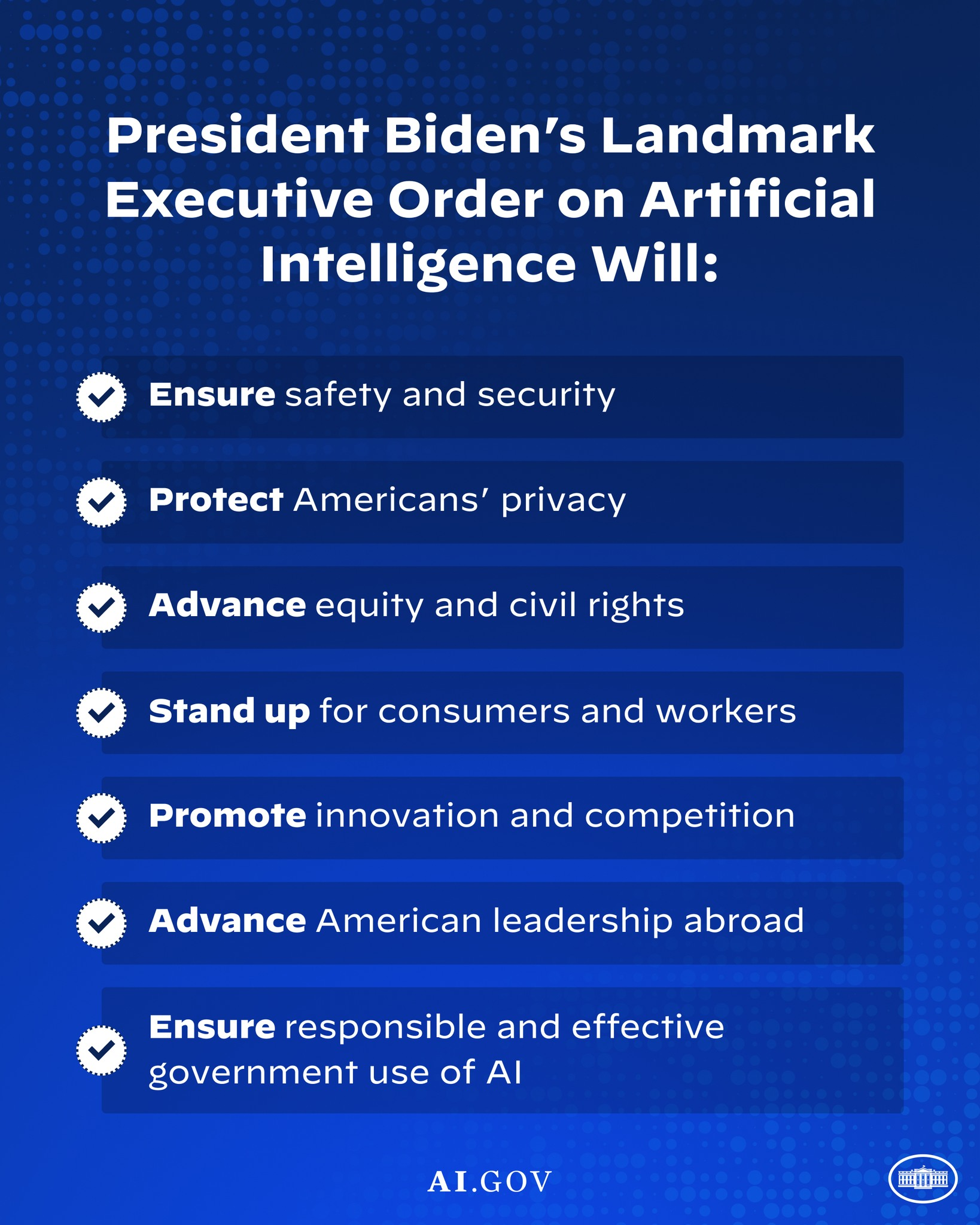
White House graphic listing the provisions of the executive order

The order has been characterized as an effort for the United States to capture potential benefits from AI while mitigating risks associated with AI technologies. Upon signing the order, Biden stated that AI technologies were being developed at "warp speed", and argued that to "realize the promise of AI and avoid the risk, we need to govern this technology".

Policy goals outlined by the order include the following:

- Promoting competition and innovation in the AI industry
- Upholding civil and labor rights and protecting consumers and their privacy from AI-enabled harms
- Specifying federal policies governing procurement and use of AI
- Developing watermarking systems for AI-generated content and warding off intellectual property theft stemming from the use of generative models
- Maintaining the nation's place as a global leader in AI

== Impact on agencies ==
=== Creation of chief AI officer positions ===
The executive order required a number of large federal agencies to appoint a chief artificial intelligence officer, with a number of departments having already appointed a relevant officer prior to the order. In the days following the order, news publication FedScoop confirmed that the General Services Administration (GSA) and the United States Department of Education appointed relevant chief AI officers. The National Science Foundation (NSF) also confirmed it had elevated an official to serve as its chief AI officer.

=== Department responsibilities ===
Under the executive order, the Department of Homeland Security (DHS) was responsible for developing AI-related security guidelines, including cybersecurity-related matters. The DHS will also work with private sector firms in sectors including the energy industry and other "critical infrastructure" to coordinate responses to AI-enabled security threats. Executive Order 14110 mandated the Department of Veterans Affairs to launch an AI technology competition aimed at reducing occupational burnout among healthcare workers through AI-assisted tools for routine tasks.

The order also mandated the Department of Commerce's National Institute of Standards and Technology (NIST) to develop a generative artificial intelligence-focused resource to supplement the existing AI Risk Management Framework.

== Analysis ==
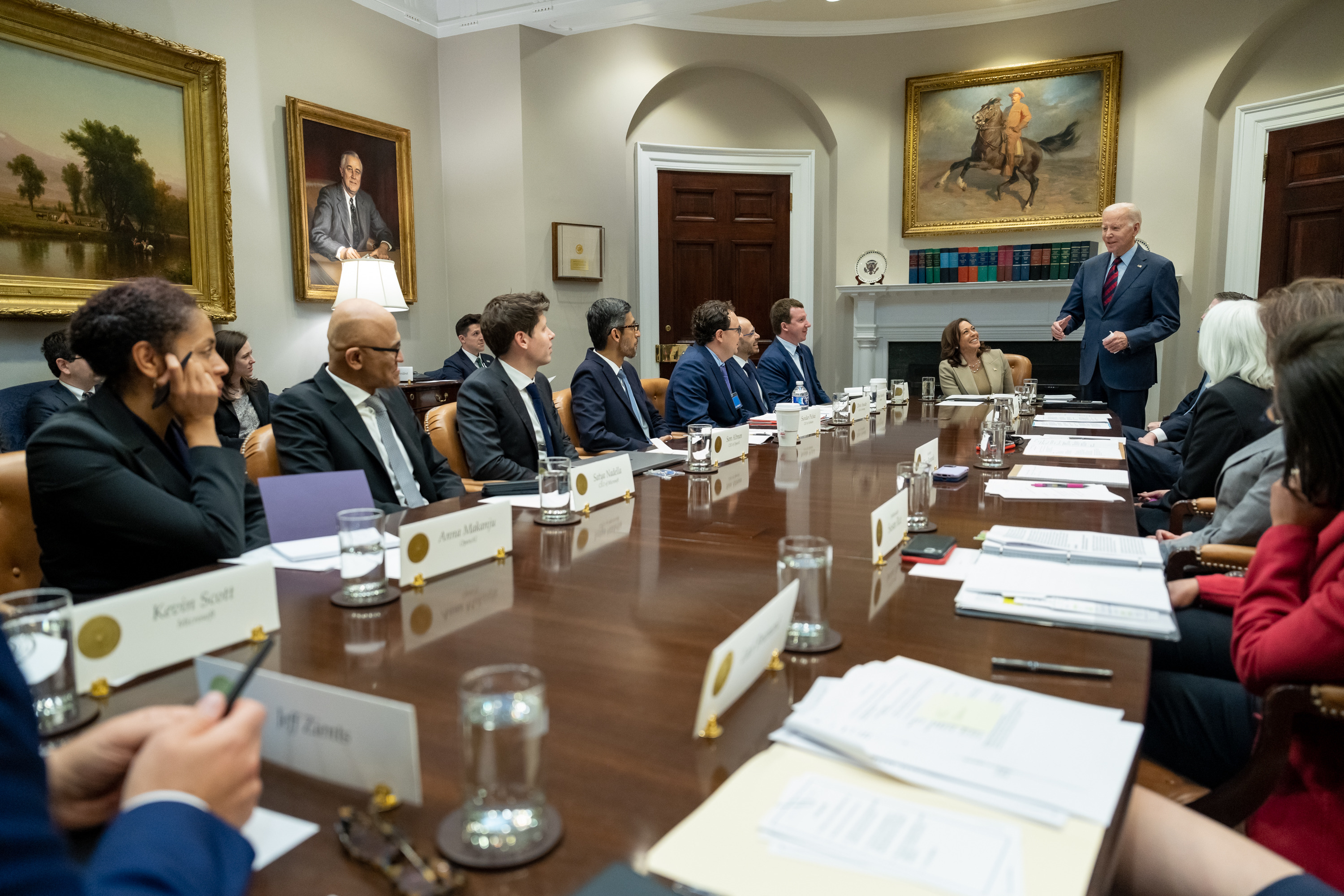
President Biden visiting a meeting held by Vice President Kamala Harris alongside CEOs of AI companies on May 4, 2023

The executive order has been described as the most comprehensive piece of governance by the United States government pertaining to AI. Earlier in 2023 prior to the signing of the order, the Biden administration had announced a Blueprint for an AI Bill of Rights, and had secured non-binding AI safety commitments from major tech companies. The issuing of the executive order comes at a time in which lawmakers including Senate Majority Leader Chuck Schumer have pushed for legislation to regulate AI in the 118th United States Congress.

According to Axios, despite the wide scope of the executive order, it notably does not touch upon a number of AI-related policy proposals. This includes proposals for a "licensing regime" to government advanced AI models, which has received support from industry leaders including Sam Altman. Additionally, the executive order does not seek to prohibit 'high-risk' uses of AI technology, and does not aim to mandate that tech companies release information surrounding AI systems' training data and models.

== Reception ==
=== Political and media reception ===
The editorial board of the Houston Chronicle described the order as a "first step toward protecting humanity". The issuing of the order received praise from Democratic members of Congress, including Senator Richard Blumenthal (D-CT) and Representative Ted Lieu (D-CA). Representative Don Beyer (D-VA), who leads the House AI Caucus, praised the order as a "comprehensive strategy for responsible innovation", while arguing that Congress must take initiative to pass legislation on AI.

The draft of the order received criticism from Republican Senator Ted Cruz (R-TX), who described it as creating "barriers to innovation disguised as safety measures".

=== Public reception ===
Polling from the AI Policy Institute showed that 69% of all voters support the executive order, while 15% oppose it. Breaking it down by party, support was at 78% for Democrats, 65% for independents, and 64% for Republicans.

=== Industry reception ===
The executive order received strong criticism from the Chamber of Commerce as well as tech industry groups including NetChoice and the Software and Information Industry Association, all of which count "Big Tech" companies Amazon, Meta, and Google as members. Representatives from the organizations argued that the executive order threatens to hinder private sector innovation.

=== Civil society reception ===
According to CNBC, a number of leaders advocacy organizations praised the executive order for its provisions on "AI fairness", while simultaneously urging congressional action to strengthen regulation. Maya Wiley, president and CEO of the Leadership Conference on Civil and Human Rights, praised the order while urging Congress to take initiative to "ensure that innovation makes us more fair, just, and prosperous, rather than surveilled, silenced, and stereotyped". A representative from the American Civil Liberties Union (ACLU) praised provisions of the order centered on combating AI-enabled discrimination, while also voiced concern over sections of the order focused on law enforcement and national security.

=== Second Trump administration ===
Hours after his inauguration as the 47th president of the United States, Donald Trump rescinded the order, labeling it, among several other of Biden's executive orders and actions, as "unpopular, inflationary, illegal, and radical practices".

== See also ==
- National Security Memorandum on Artificial Intelligence
- List of executive actions by Joe Biden
- AI Action Plan
