= Executive Order 14365 =

Trump administration AI policy framework

- Long title: Ensuring a National Policy Framework for Artificial Intelligence

Legislative history
- Signed into law by President Donald Trump on December 11, 2025

Executive Order 14365, titled Ensuring a National Policy Framework for Artificial Intelligence, is an executive order issued by United States President Donald Trump on December 11, 2025. The order establishes a federal policy aimed at promoting a uniform national framework for artificial intelligence (AI) regulation and limiting the impact of conflicting state laws.

== Background ==
The order was issued as the administration indicated it would work with Congress to develop a single national framework for artificial intelligence regulation, amid growing state-level regulation in the United States, where multiple states had adopted laws addressing issues such as safety, transparency, and consumer protection.

The order directs federal authorities to challenge certain state-level artificial intelligence laws and contemplates limiting federal funding to states maintaining regulations deemed inconsistent with federal policy. It also reflects concerns within the administration that a fragmented state-by-state regulatory approach could hinder the development and deployment of artificial intelligence technologies.
