= Chief AI officer =

C-suite position

A Chief AI Officer (CAIO), also known as chief artificial intelligence officer, is a executive role within a company or organization which handles the handling, implementation and or development of artificial intelligence. Their role as a whole is bringing business and artificial intelligence together to benefit a desired outcome.

In September 2026, a census by ProfessionLens found an enterprise-wide chief AI officer at 24 of the Fortune 500 companies, and at 54 once combined titles such as chief data and AI officer were counted.

== Role ==
The CAIO is responsible for implementing AI technology in an organization typically in operational strategy and product differentiation with help from other executives. According to Head of AI of Sailpoint, Joe Mayberry, the CAIO focuses on making corporate strategies successful by means of changing the strategies themselves to reflect their company or organization's market. New policies would also need to align with the company's digital transformation and business goals to further improve their operational efficiency, enhance the experience of their customer or to create new sources of revenue.

== Skills ==
A Chief AI Officer would be expected to be well-versed in AI technologies and understand how to work with AI. They would also to have technical AI skills like machine learning, data science and analytics, traditional software development and understanding the infrastructure of AI. Usual executive positional skills including management and cultural leadership and an ethical mindset are also expected in CAIOs.

== See also ==
- AI in business
- Ethical issues in machine learning
