= John Ravitz =

American politician

Chair of the Manhattan Republican Party
- In office 2002–2003
- Preceded by: Roy M. Goodman
- Succeeded by: James Ortenzio

Member of the New York State Assembly from the 73rd district
- In office 1993–2002
- Preceded by: David Rosado
- Succeeded by: Jonathan Bing

Member of the New York State Assembly from the 66th district
- In office 1991–1992
- Preceded by: Mark Alan Siegel
- Succeeded by: Deborah J. Glick

Personal details
- Born: 1960 (age 65–66)
- Party: Republican

John A. Ravitz (born 1960) is an American businessman and former politician who served in the New York State Assembly from 1991 to 1992 (New York State Assembly District 66) and 1992 to 2002 (New York State Assembly District 73). A Rockefeller Republican, he represented a district in Manhattan. He was an unsuccessful candidate for the New York State Senate in a special election on February 13, 2002. After leaving office, Ravitz briefly served as chairman of the Manhattan Republican Party before he became the executive director of the New York Board of Elections until 2007. Ravitz later became Executive Vice President of the Business Council of Westchester in Westchester County.

New York State Assembly
Preceded by Mark Alan Siegel	Member of the New York State Assembly from the 66th district 1991–1992	Succeeded by Deborah J. Glick
Preceded by David Rosado	Member of the New York State Assembly from the 73rd district 1993–2002	Succeeded by Jonathan Bing
