= Jonathan Bing =

American attorney and politician

Jonathan L. Bing

Member of the New York State Assembly from the 73rd district
- In office January 1, 2003 – June 8, 2011
- Preceded by: John Ravitz
- Succeeded by: Dan Quart

Personal details
- Born: March 13, 1970 (age 56) New York City, New York, U.S.
- Party: Democratic
- Spouse: Meredith Ballew
- Children: 1 daughter
- Education: University of Pennsylvania (BA); New York University (JD)
- Occupation: Politician; attorney

Jonathan L. Bing (born March 13, 1970) is an American attorney and politician. He was a Democratic member of the New York State Assembly from the 73rd district.

== Political career ==
A resident of Manhattan's East Side for two decades, Bing was first elected to the New York State Assembly in November 2002 from the 73rd Assembly District in Manhattan. That district includes the Upper East Side, East Midtown, Sutton Place and Turtle Bay communities. Bing was re-elected in 2010, having received two-thirds of the vote in a district that had been represented by a Republican Assembly member for twelve years prior to 2002.

During his nine years in the assembly, Bing wrote 85 pieces of legislation that passed the assembly, thirty five of which were signed into law. In 2009, he sponsored a bill to make impersonating an attorney a felony. He also sponsored a bill to exempt pre-existing eating establishments with smoking lounges from legislation which banned smoking where food and drink is served.

During the 2010 session, Bing wrote ten bills that passed the assembly, five of which passed both houses of the legislature and were signed into law. His 2010 legislative successes included the law which provides for no-fault divorce in New York State, ending the state's notoriety as the only jurisdiction in the nation without this provision. Bing also wrote a law to allow cultural and higher education institutions more flexibility with their endowments, allowing them to preserve jobs and programs during difficult economic times. Bing wrote two laws in 2010 (Chapters 441 and 443) intended to reduce administrative burdens in the insurance and real estate brokerage industries. He sponsored a bill to abolish "last in, first out" policies in New York education. Bing's bill to authorize cameras in New York City's Select Bus Service lanes was included in the 2010–11 budget, and his legislation to create an arts education advisory panel for the New York City schools was voluntarily adopted by the New York City Department of Education.

Bing wrote a bill signed into law in August 2006 that expanded the statute of limitations for workers' compensation claims made by 9/11 rescue, recovery and clean-up workers, allowing hundreds to get benefits. In 2009, the governor signed into law Bing's bill to increase criminal and civil penalties against those who falsify construction records or illegally assist people with government licensing examinations as had been alleged with regard to two crane accidents that occurred on the East Side in 2008.

Bing served on the Assembly's Health; Housing; Insurance; Judiciary; Social Services; and Tourism, Parks, Arts & Sports Development Committees. He was appointed Chairman of the Assembly Committee on Oversight, Analysis and Investigation in February 2011, after previously serving as the chair of the Committee on Libraries and Education Technology, the Legislative Task Force on People with Disabilities and the Subcommittee on Mitchell-Lama Housing.

He stepped down from the Assembly in June 2011, when Governor Andrew Cuomo appointed him to supervise impaired insurance companies as Special Deputy Superintendent of the New York Liquidation Bureau.

== Personal life ==
Prior to his 2002 election, Bing was a practicing attorney in Manhattan. After serving as law clerk to U.S. District Court Judge Bruce M. Van Sickle, Bing joined the law firm Torys LLP in 1996 as an attorney in its labor and employment practice group. He wrote the legal article "Protecting the Mentally Retarded from Capital Punishment: State Efforts Since Penry and Recommendations for the Future" for the N.Y.U. Review of Law & Social Change.

After September 11, Bing was chosen to organize over two hundred fifty attorneys as the New York Coordinator of the Federal Emergency Management Agency/American Bar Association's Disaster Legal Services program which provided free, comprehensive legal assistance to nearly a thousand New Yorkers affected by the terrorist attacks.

Bing lives in Turtle Bay with his wife, Meredith Ballew, Director of Fund Development for the Vanderbilt YMCA, and their daughter.

New York State Assembly
Preceded by John Ravitz	Member of the New York State Assembly from the 73rd district 2003–2011	Succeeded by Dan Quart
