= Siffert (surname) =

Siffert is a Swiss surname. Notable people with the surname include:

- David Siffert, American politician
- Emmanuel Siffert (born 1967), Swiss conductor
- Jo Siffert (1936–1971), Swiss racing driver
