= RAISE Act =

RAISE Act may refer to:

- Reforming American Immigration for Strong Employment Act
- Responsible AI Safety and Education Act, New York state, US
