= California AI laws =

Artificial intelligence laws in the US state of California

The State of California has several laws regulating artificial intelligence, including the Artificial Intelligence Training Data Transparency Act (AB 2013) and the Transparency in Frontier Artificial Intelligence Act (TFAIA) (SB 53), which went into effect on January 1, 2026. In addition, the California AI Transparency Act went into effect in August 2026.

By signing TFAIA into law on September 29, 2025, California became the first state to enact a statute specifically addressing the development of frontier AI models. The TFAIA protects whistleblowers who have reasonable cause to believe their employers are endangering lives or causing damages worth $1 billion. It also requires companies to publish their safety test results.

On September 9, 2026, Governor Newsom signed Senate Bill 813 (SB 813) and Assembly Bill 1405 (AB 1405). The bills outline a regulatory framework for the independent auditing of AI systems or models. SB 813 calls for the Government Operations Agency to designate and regulate independent verification organizations (IVOs), auditors that are deemed by the agency to possess the necessary expertise and methodology for evaluating risks from AI systems. The agency must develop criteria for organizations to gain IVO status by January 1, 2028. AB 1405 requires the Government Operations Agency to create a registry for AI auditors, who should maintain objectivity and independence from the assessed party.

On September 10, 2026, Governor Gavin Newsom signed a new series of laws to enhance protections for children from AI chatbots and technology. It requires tech companies to conduct risk assessments before new chatbot rollouts and penalizes companies if they're found guilty of harming children, with a fine of up to $1 million per child.

Failed AI regulation bills in California have included SB 1047, the Safe and Secure Innovation for Frontier Artificial Intelligence Models Act, which was vetoed by Governor Gavin Newsom in September 2024.

== See also ==
- Regulation of artificial intelligence in the United States
