= Bill Green (New York politician) =

American politician

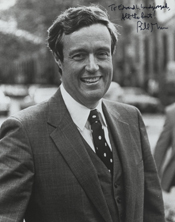

Member of the U.S. House of Representatives from New York
- In office February 14, 1978 – January 3, 1993
- Preceded by: Ed Koch
- Succeeded by: Carolyn Maloney (redistricted)
- Constituency: 18th district (1978–1983); 15th district (1983–1993)

Member of the New York State Assembly from the 66th district
- In office January 1, 1967 – December 31, 1968
- Preceded by: Louis DeSalvio
- Succeeded by: Stephen C. Hansen

Member of the New York State Assembly from the 72nd district
- In office January 1, 1966 – December 31, 1966
- Preceded by: Constituency established
- Succeeded by: Charles Rangel

Member of the New York State Assembly from the New York County's 9th district
- In office January 1, 1965 – December 31, 1965
- Preceded by: John Brook
- Succeeded by: Constituency abolished

Personal details
- Born: Sedgwick William Green; October 16, 1929 New York City, New York, U.S.
- Died: October 14, 2002 (aged 72) New York City, New York, U.S.
- Party: Republican
- Spouse: Patricia Freiburg
- Children: 2
- Education: Harvard University (BA, JD)

Sedgwick William Green (October 16, 1929 – October 14, 2002) was a Republican member of the United States House of Representatives from New York. He represented a district covering most or all of Manhattan's East Side. To date, he is the last Republican to have represented Manhattan in the U.S. House.

== Life and career ==
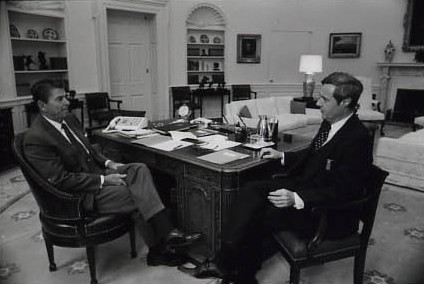
Green with President Ronald Reagan in 1982

Bill Green was born on October 16, 1929, in New York City, the son of Louis A. Green and Evelyn (née Schoenberg) Green. His father was a wealthy investor who was one of the main shareholders in Grand Union, and Bill Green grew up in Manhattan. He graduated from The Horace Mann School in 1946, Harvard University in 1950, and Harvard Law School in 1953. From 1953 to 1955, he served in the United States Army. After leaving the army, he was legal secretary for U.S. Court of Appeals (D.C.) Judge George T. Washington before leaving to practice law. From 1961-64, Green was the chief counsel to the New York Joint Legislative Committee on Housing and Urban Development. He was a member of the New York State Assembly from 1965 to 1968, sitting in the 175th, 176th and 177th New York State Legislatures. In 1968 he ran for Congress, but lost the Republican nomination to Whitney North Seymour Jr., who went on to be defeated by Democrat Ed Koch., Afterwards he was the New York City director of the United States Department of Housing and Urban Development.

Green was elected as a Republican to the 95th United States Congress, to fill the vacancy caused by the resignation of Ed Koch, and was re-elected to the 96th, 97th, 98th, 99th, 100th, 101st and 102nd United States Congresses, holding office from February 14, 1978, to January 3, 1993. A mostly liberal Republican, he was one of the few members of his party to have a long run in office from a city long dominated by Democrats.

However, the East Side-based district, long considered a bastion of moderate Republicans, had been trending Democratic at the national level for some time. Redistricting in 1992 made his district friendlier to Democrats, as it gained some heavily Democratic portions of Queens and Brooklyn. As a result, he narrowly lost his re-election bid that year to New York City Councilwoman Carolyn Maloney. Green sought the Republican nomination for Governor of New York in 1994, but was defeated by State Senator George Pataki.

As of 2026, Green is the last Republican to represent any part of Manhattan in Congress. The Republicans have only made one substantive bid for the seat–renumbered as the 12th in 2013–since Green left office, and have never cracked the 40 percent barrier in the district.

== Personal life and death ==
Green and his wife, the former Patricia Freiburg, had two children. He died from liver cancer at a hospital in Manhattan on October 14, 2002, two days before his 73rd birthday.

== See also ==
- List of Jewish members of the United States Congress

U.S. House of Representatives
Preceded by Ed Koch	Member of the U.S. House of Representatives from New York's 18th congressional district 1978–1983	Succeeded by Robert García
Preceded by Leo C. Zeferetti	Member of the U.S. House of Representatives from New York's 15th congressional district 1983–1993	Succeeded by Charles Rangel
Party political offices
New office	Chair of the Gypsy Moths; 1981–1983; Served alongside: Carl Pursell	Position abolished
