= New York's 66th State Assembly district =

American legislative district

Assemblymember
Deborah Glick; D–Greenwich Village

New York's 66th State Assembly district is one of 150 districts of the New York State Assembly. It is currently represented by Assemblywoman Deborah Glick (D). In 2025, she announced that she would not seek re-election in 2026.

== Geography ==
District 66 is located in southwestern Manhattan, comprising the neighborhood of Greenwich Village, Tribeca, SoHo, NoHo, as well as a small portion of Battery Park City and the Meatpacking District. The district includes City Hall, Washington Square Park, Union Square, the Stonewall Inn and the main campus of New York University.

The district overlaps (partially) with New York's 10th and 12th congressional districts, the 23rd, 28th and 47th districts of the New York State Senate, and the 1st, 2nd and 3rd districts of the New York City Council.

== Recent election results ==
=== 2026 ===
2026 New York State Assembly election, District 66
Primary election
Party	Candidate	Votes	%
Democratic	David Siffert	4,388	27.4
Democratic	Jeannine Kiely	4,373	27.3
Democratic	Ryder Kessler	3,641	22.7
Democratic	Benjamin Yee	2,238	14.0
Democratic	Corinne Arnold	727	4.5
Democratic	Furhan Ahmad	610	3.8
Write-in		50	0.3
Total votes		16,027	100.0
General election
Democratic	David Siffert		
Write-in			
Total votes			100.0

=== 2024 ===
2024 New York State Assembly election, District 66
Party	Candidate	Votes	%
Democratic	Deborah Glick (incumbent)	47,097	98.9
Write-in		512	1.1
Total votes		47,612	100.0
Democratic hold			

=== 2022 ===
2022 New York State Assembly election, District 66
Primary election
Party	Candidate	Votes	%
Democratic	Deborah Glick (incumbent)	9,183	70.0
Democratic	Ryder Kessler	3,914	29.8
Write-in		20	0.2
Total votes		13,117	100.0
General election
Democratic	Deborah Glick	34,283	
Working Families	Deborah Glick	3,383	
Total	Deborah Glick (incumbent)	37,666	99.1
Write-in		338	0.9
Total votes		38,004	100.0
Democratic hold			

=== 2020 ===
2020 New York State Assembly election, District 66
Party	Candidate	Votes	%
Democratic	Deborah Glick (incumbent)	47,688	84.9
Republican	Tamara Lashchyk	8,431	15.0
Write-in		68	0.1
Total votes		56,187	100.0
Democratic hold			

=== 2018 ===
Following Cynthia Nixon's unsuccessful gubernatorial primary campaign, arrangements had to be made for the Working Families Party to endorse the Democratic nominee, Andrew Cuomo. This was due to election laws (at the time) that required Nixon to run for a different office, since the party had endorsed her prior to the September primary. Nixon and WFP leadership chose to run in this district, where she lives. While there was some local support for Nixon, she did not actively campaign.

2018 New York State Assembly election, District 66
Party	Candidate	Votes	%
Democratic	Deborah Glick (incumbent)	37,419	82.0
Working Families	Cynthia Nixon	8,013	17.5
Write-in		234	0.5
Total votes		45,666	100.0
Democratic hold			

=== 2016 ===
2016 New York State Assembly election, District 66
Primary election
Party	Candidate	Votes	%
Democratic	Deborah Glick (incumbent)	3,383	74.7
Democratic	Jim Fouratt	835	25.1
Write-in		45	0.2
Total votes		19,463	100.0
General election
Democratic	Deborah Glick	46,649	
Working Families	Deborah Glick	3,882	
Total	Deborah Glick (incumbent)	50,531	99.2
Write-in		390	0.8
Total votes		50,921	100.0
Democratic hold			

=== 2014 ===
2014 New York State Assembly election, District 66
Party	Candidate	Votes	%
Democratic	Deborah Glick (incumbent)	16,817	79.7
Republican	Nekeshia Woods	2,727	12.9
Progressive	Alexander Meadows	1,545	7.3
Write-in		25	0.1
Total votes		21,114	100.0
Democratic hold			

=== 2012 ===
2012 New York State Assembly election, District 66
Party	Candidate	Votes	%
Democratic	Deborah Glick (incumbent)	40,142	99.7
Write-in		104	0.3
Total votes		40,246	100.0
Democratic win (new boundaries)			

=== 2010 ===
2010 New York State Assembly election, District 66
Party	Candidate	Votes	%
Democratic	Deborah Glick	24,520	
Working Families	Deborah Glick	4,254	
Total	Deborah Glick (incumbent)	28,774	86.6
Republican	William Buran	4,426	13.3
Write-in		27	0.1
Total votes		33,227	100.0
Democratic hold			

=== 2008 ===
2008 New York State Assembly election, District 66
Party	Candidate	Votes	%
Democratic	Deborah Glick	46,556	
Working Families	Deborah Glick	3,358	
Total	Deborah Glick (incumbent)	49,914	100.0
Write-in		6	0.0
Total votes		49,920	100.0
Democratic hold			

=== 2006 ===
2006 New York State Assembly election, District 66
Party	Candidate	Votes	%
Democratic	Deborah Glick	28,429	
Working Families	Deborah Glick	5,238	
Total	Deborah Glick (incumbent)	33,667	99.9
Write-in		12	0.1
Total votes		33,679	100.0
Democratic hold			

=== 2004 ===
2004 New York State Assembly election, District 66
Party	Candidate	Votes	%
Democratic	Deborah Glick	47,139	
Working Families	Deborah Glick	3,187	
Total	Deborah Glick (incumbent)	50,326	97.6
Libertarian	Nic Leobold	1,244	2.4
Write-in		0	0.0
Total votes		51,570	100.0
Democratic hold			

=== 2002 ===
2002 New York State Assembly election, District 66
Party	Candidate	Votes	%
Democratic	Deborah Glick	23,353	
Working Families	Deborah Glick	3,074	
Total	Deborah Glick (incumbent)	26,427	86.0
Republican	Jak Karako	3,973	
Libertarian	Jak Karako	338	
Total	Jak Karako	4,311	14.0
Write-in		3	0.0
Total votes		30,741	100.0
Democratic win (new boundaries)			

=== 2000 ===
2000 New York State Assembly election, District 66
Party	Candidate	Votes	%
Democratic	Deborah Glick	40,969	
Working Families	Deborah Glick	3,094	
Total	Deborah Glick (incumbent)	44,063	84.4
Republican	Joseph Mauriello	6,362	
Liberal	Joseph Mauriello	1,074	
Total	Joseph Mauriello	7,436	14.2
Independence	Carolyn Sackett	709	1.4
Write-in		1	0.0
Total votes		52,209	100.0
Democratic hold			

== Past Assemblypersons ==
- Deborah Glick (1992–present)
- John Ravitz (1991–1992)
- Mark Alan Siegel (1975–91)
- Antonio G. Olivieri (1971–1975)
- Stephen C. Hansen (1969–1970)
- S. William Green (1965–1968)
- Louis DeSalvio (1965)
