= California Assembly Bill 2013 (2024) =

California law on AI training data disclosure

California Assembly Bill 2013 (AB 2013) is a California law requiring developers of generative artificial intelligence systems to publicly disclose information about the data used to train their models. The law passed unanimously in both the Senate and the Assembly, and took effect on January 1, 2026.

== See also ==
- California AI laws
- Transparency in Frontier Artificial Intelligence Act
- Artificial Intelligence Act
- Regulation of artificial intelligence in the United States
- Regulation of artificial intelligence
