= Stephen C. Hansen =

American politician

Member of the New York State Assembly from the 66th district
- In office January 1, 1969 – December 31, 1970
- Preceded by: Bill Green
- Succeeded by: Antonio G. Olivieri

Personal details
- Born: July 3, 1940 New York City, U.S.
- Died: August 21, 2007 (aged 67)
- Party: Republican
- Education: Princeton University; University of Virginia School of Law

Stephen C. Hansen (July 3, 1940 – August 21, 2007) was an American politician. He served as a Republican member for the 66th district of the New York State Assembly.

== Life and career ==
Hansen was born in New York City. He attended Princeton University and the University of Virginia School of Law.

Hansen served in the New York State Assembly from 1969 to 1970.

Hansen died on August 21, 2007, at the age of 67.
