= Mark Alan Siegel =

American politician

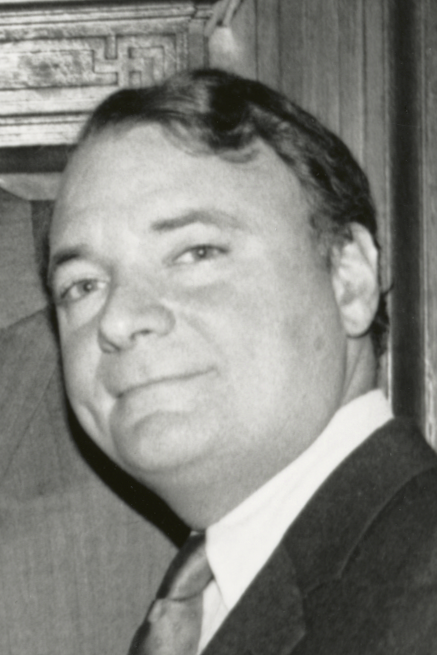

Chair of the Palm Beach County Democratic Party
- In office December 2008 – September 2012
- Preceded by: Wahid Mahmood
- Succeeded by: Terrie Rizzo

Member of the New York State Assembly from the 66th district
- In office January 1, 1975 – December 31, 1990
- Preceded by: Antonio G. Olivieri
- Succeeded by: John Ravitz

Personal details
- Born: May 20, 1944 Manhattan, New York City, New York
- Died: 9 July 2026 (aged 82)
- Party: Democratic
- Education: Columbia University (AB, JD)

Mark Alan Siegel (May 20, 1944 - July 9, 2026) was an American politician who served in the New York State Assembly from the 66th district from 1975 to 1990. He ran for the Florida House of Representatives in 2006, but came in third place in the Democratic primary. He served as Chair of the Palm Beach County Democratic Party from December 2008 to September 2012.

== Personal life ==
He was Jewish.
