= Dan Quart =

American politician

Member of the New York State Assembly from the 73rd district
- In office September 14, 2011 – December 31, 2022
- Preceded by: Jonathan Bing
- Succeeded by: Alex Bores

Personal details
- Born: May 29, 1972 (age 54) New York City, New York, U.S.
- Party: Democratic
- Spouse: Miriam Quart
- Children: 2
- Education: Binghamton University (BA); St. John's University (JD)

Dan Quart (born May 29, 1972) is an American lawyer, politician, and judge. He was a member of the New York State Assembly representing District 73 which includes parts of the Upper East Side and Midtown East areas in the Manhattan, New York City, New York. He was originally elected in a special election in 2011 following the resignation of Jonathan Bing. On December 23, 2021, he announced his plan to step down at the end of his current term. In 2022, he was elected to an open seat on the New York City Civil Court.

== Early life and education ==
Quart was born in the Washington Heights neighborhood of Manhattan. He grew up in Mitchell-Lama Housing. His father was a teacher for 41 years and a member of the United Federation of Teachers.

== Career ==
After being admitted to the bar, Quart worked as a volunteer lawyer for Legal Aid's Housing Division. In 2003, he was awarded the Pro Bono Publico Award by New York State Chief Judge Judith Kaye for his commitment to providing legal services to the poor.

Before his election to the State Assembly, Quart served on Manhattan Community Board 8 for eight years, where he was co-chair of the Transportation Committee and the chair of the board's Second Ave Subway Task force. When the project stalled, he helped secure $1 billion in funding.

In 2005, he finished second in the Democratic primary for City Council to Jessica Lappin.

Quart was elected to the New York State Assembly in 2011. He has introduced legislation to end cash bail, reform campaign finance laws for District Attorneys races, and hold reckless drivers accountable. He was part of a 7-year effort to repeal New York's gravity knife ban, a state law found unconstitutional by a Manhattan federal court judge.

In 2012, he was named one of City & State's "40 under 40" people who are young and influential in New York City politics.

In 2021, he ran for Manhattan District Attorney, losing in the Democratic primary to Alvin Bragg.

He had continued to do criminal defense work while serving in the assembly.

Quart was elected to the New York City Civil Court in 2022. He served in New York City Criminal Court, Bronx County, from 2023 through 2025.

== Personal life ==
Quart resides on the Upper East Side with his wife Miriam, and their two children.

== See also ==
- List of members of the New York State Assembly
- List of people from New York City

New York State Assembly
Preceded by Jonathan Bing	New York State Assembly, 73rd District; 2011–present	Incumbent
