= Alex Bores =

American politician (born 1990)

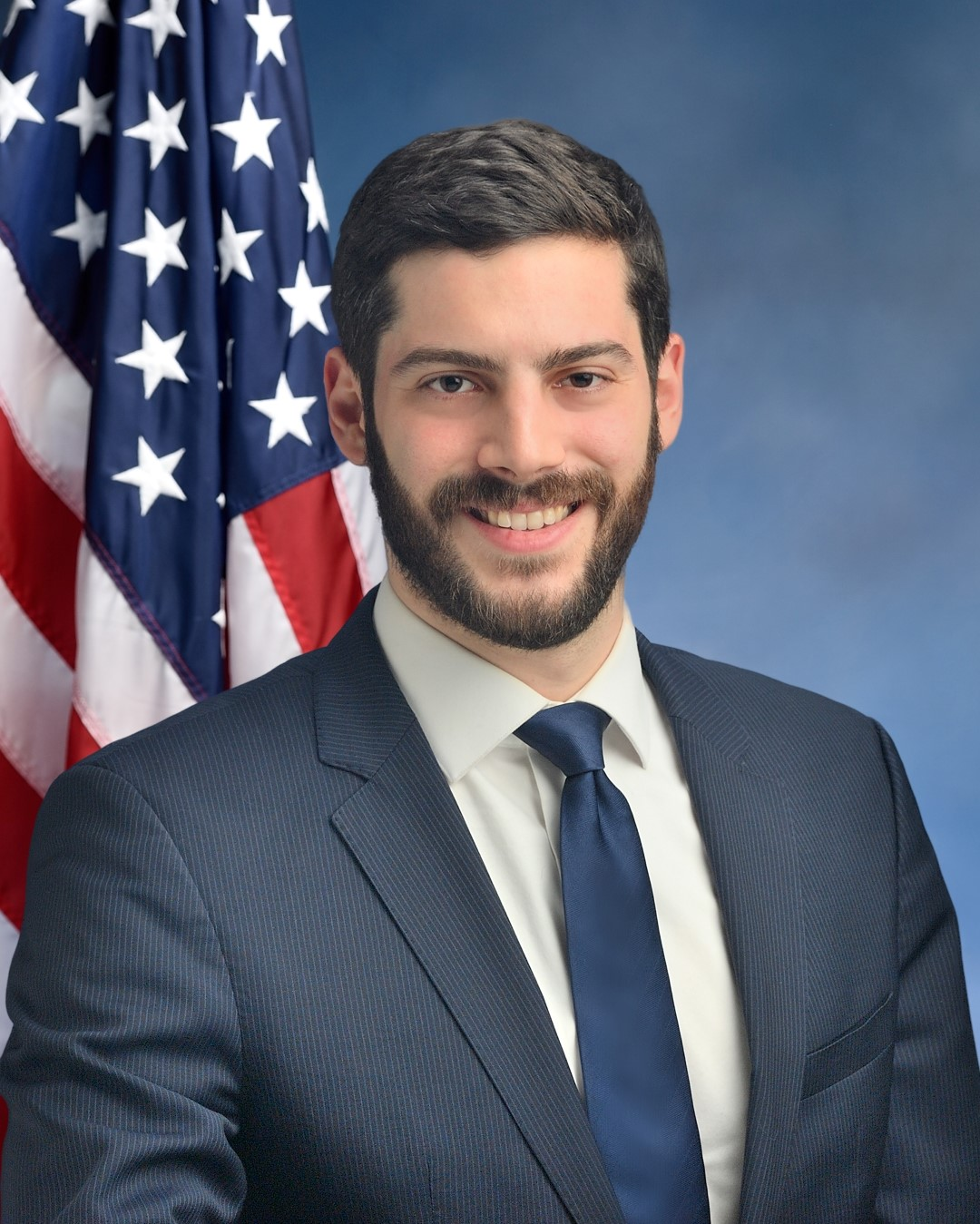

Member of the New York State Assembly from the 73rd district
- Incumbent
- Assumed office January 1, 2023
- Preceded by: Dan Quart

Personal details
- Born: November 2, 1990 (age 35) New York City, New York, U.S.
- Party: Democratic
- Spouse: Darya Moldavskaya (m. 2019)
- Children: 1
- Education: Cornell University (BS); Georgia Institute of Technology (MS)
- Website: State Assembly website Campaign website

Alex Bores (born November 2, 1990) is an American politician serving in the New York State Assembly since 2023. A member of the Democratic Party, he represents the 73rd district in Manhattan's Upper East Side.

Before entering politics, Bores worked as a data scientist and technology consultant. He earned a bachelor's degree from Cornell University and a master's degree in computer science from the Georgia Institute of Technology.

His work in office has included artificial intelligence policy, including co-authoring the Responsible AI Safety and Education Act (RAISE Act). He was a Democratic candidate in the 2026 election for New York's 12th congressional district.

== Early life and education ==
Bores was born in Manhattan, New York City. He is a fifth-generation New Yorker. His father was a union member, who worked in television sports production, and his mother was a television news writer. He grew up on the Upper East Side and attended Hunter College High School.

He earned a bachelor's degree in industrial relations and economics from Cornell University. While at Cornell, Bores was elected to the university's board of trustees. He later went to Georgia Tech, where he earned a master's degree in computer science with a specialization in machine learning.

== Early career ==
From 2008 to 2009, Bores served as a constituent services representative for City Councilwoman Jessica Lappin. He worked as a consultant for Cornerstone Research from 2013 to 2014.

Bores joined Palantir in 2014, where he worked as a data scientist, project lead, enterprise lead, and U.S. government lead. At Palantir, he worked with the United States Department of Justice to investigate pharmacies overprescribing opioids. He also worked with other government agencies including the Center for Disease Control and the Department of Veteran Affairs. Bores left Palantir in 2019, saying he disagreed with its decision to renew its contract with U.S. Immigration and Customs Enforcement (ICE). Bloomberg News later reported conflicting accounts of the circumstances surrounding his departure, which Bores disputed.

From 2019 to 2020, Bores was the head of the commercial division and acting general manager of Merlon Intelligence, an anti-money laundering risk management platform. From 2020 to 2022, he served as the head of customer success and president of transportation practice at Promise.

== New York State Assembly ==
In March 2022, Bores entered the race for New York State Assembly in District 73 with a platform including affordability and renewable energy. He was elected in November 2022.

Bores co-authored the Responsible AI Safety and Education Act (RAISE Act), an AI safety bill that passed the New York State Senate and Assembly in June 2025, with Politico saying that it was "widely regarded as the furthest-reaching in the country." The bill was significantly weakened by Governor Kathy Hochul before she signed it into law in December 2025. Time cited his role in co-sponsoring the RAISE Act when naming him to its 2025 Time 100 AI list.

In May 2026, shortly after the Trump administration announced its Anti-Weaponization Fund intended to compensate individuals who claim that the DOJ had been weaponized against them, Bores began working on a bill titled the "Anti-Insurrectionist Act". In a draft memo to the State Assembly, the bill was described as ensuring that “no resident of this State is enriched by what is, in substance, a publicly-funded political payout negotiated between the President and his own Administration.”

Bores co-sponsored a bill in the New York state legislature that would impose a one-year moratorium on new data centers in the state. It passed the legislature on June 4 but has not been signed by Hochul. The legislature also passed a biosecurity bill co-sponsored by Bores that would require pathogen screening for artificial gene synthesis.

== U.S. House of Representatives campaign ==
Results by precinct Lasher: 30–40%; 40–50%; 50–60%; 60–70%; 100%; Bores: 20–30%; 30–40%; 40–50%; 50–60%; Schlossberg: 30–40%; 50–60%; Schwalbe: 100%; Tie: 30–40%

In October 2025, Bores announced his candidacy for New York's 12th district in the U.S. House of Representatives to succeed Jerry Nadler. He said he entered the race due to the effects of rapidly advancing technology on American democracy and highlighted Donald Trump's close relationships with tech executives.

The campaign attracted national attention because of its connection to debates over artificial intelligence regulation. Bores's campaign was targeted by attack advertising from the OpenAI-aligned super PAC network Leading the Future. By June 2026, the group had spent more than $7.6 million in opposing his candidacy. Politico described the super PAC's tactic as "beat[ing] up on Bores so badly that when the idea of regulating AI development comes up, other politicians run the other direction." Transformer described the race as a "microcosm" of a nationwide political-spending battle over AI regulation due to the involvement of "dueling AI-focused super PACs."

Bores's candidacy was supported by Jobs and Democracy PAC, a super PAC aligned with the nonprofit Public First Action. Public First Action received $20 million from the AI company Anthropic. According to the company, the funds could not be used for federal election activity. Support for Bores's campaign also came from DREAM NYC, a super PAC whose only disclosed donor was an employee of Anthropic who donated $50,000. Additionally, Ripple co-founder Chris Larsen committed $3.5 million to Bores's campaign, aiming to provide a "counterweight" to the attack advertising. The campaign was also supported by a new super PAC, Guardrails Alliance, funded by the American Association of University Professors, the American Federation of Teachers, the Working Families Party, and other groups, with a similar goal of counterbalancing the attack spending. According to The New York Times, a total of $6.5 million originating from four different super PACs was spent supporting Bores or attacking his opponents.

As of February 2026, the majority of contributions to Bores's campaign had come from outside of New York City, with 12 percent originating from within the congressional district. By June 2026, about $12 million in independent expenditures had been spent to support and oppose his campaign. In an article published in May 2026, The New Yorker described Bores's run as "a proxy battle between OpenAI and Anthropic."

Bores finished second in the primary election and was defeated by Micah Lasher. Other Democratic candidates for the seat included Jack Schlossberg and George Conway, among others.

== Personal life ==
Bores is married to Darya Moldavskaya. They live on the Upper East Side of Manhattan and have one son.

== See also ==
- Regulation of artificial intelligence in the United States
- Campaign finance in the United States
