= Antonio G. Olivieri =

American politician (1941–1980)

Member of the New York City Council from the Manhattan at-large district
- In office January 1, 1978 – November 4, 1980
- Preceded by: Robert F. Wagner III
- Succeeded by: Edward C. Wallace

Member of the New York State Assembly from the 66th district
- In office January 1, 1971 – December 31, 1974
- Preceded by: Stephen C. Hansen
- Succeeded by: Mark Alan Siegel

Personal details
- Born: June 12, 1941 Manhattan, New York City, New York
- Died: November 4, 1980 (aged 39) Manhattan, New York City, New York
- Cause of death: cancer
- Party: Democratic
- Spouse: Frances Reese (m. 1964)

Antonio G. Olivieri (June 12, 1941 – November 4, 1980) was an American politician who served in the New York State Assembly from the 66th district from 1971 to 1974 and in the New York City Council from the Manhattan at-large district from 1978 to 1980.

He died of cancer on November 4, 1980, in Manhattan, New York City, New York at age 39.

== Personal life ==
Oliveri married Frances Gallatin Reese on June 28, 1964.

He died at home of a malignant brain tumor on November 4, 1980.
