= David Siffert =

American politician

Member-elect of the New York State Assembly from the 66th district
- Assuming office January 2027
- Succeeding: Deborah J. Glick

Personal details
- Party: Democratic

David Siffert is an American politician. A member of the Democratic Party, they are the member-elect for the 66th district of the New York State Assembly.
