= Deborah J. Glick =

American politician (born 1950)

Deborah Glick
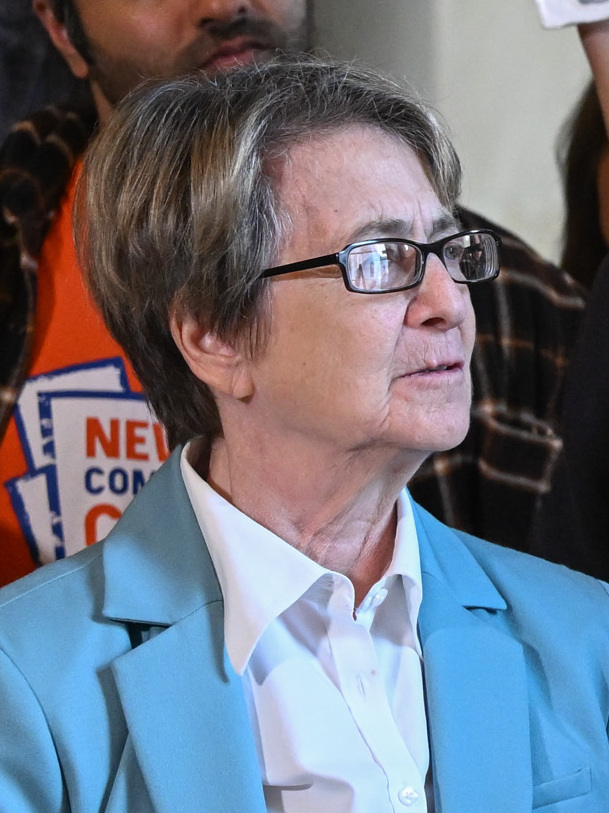
- Glick in 2025

Member of the New York State Assembly
- Incumbent
- Assumed office January 3, 1991
- Preceded by: William F. Passannante
- Succeeded by: David Siffert (elect)
- Constituency: 61st district (1991–1993); 66th district (1993–present)

Personal details
- Born: December 24, 1950 (age 75) New York City, New York, U.S.
- Party: Democratic
- Spouse: Leslie
- Education: Queens College (BA); Fordham University (MBA)
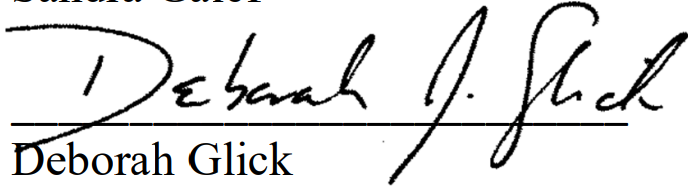
- Signature
- Website: Campaign website

Deborah J. Glick (born December 24, 1950) is an American politician who serves in the New York State Assembly from the 66th district since 1993, and from the 61st district between 1991 and 1993, as a member of the Democratic Party.

Born in Queens, Glick was educated at Queens College and Fordham University. She operated a printing business and was a deputy director for the New York City Department of Housing Preservation and Development. The Gay and Lesbian Independent Democrats elected her as its president and splintered due to her opposition to Ed Koch.

Glick was elected to the New York State Assembly in 1990, becoming the first open LGBT person to serve in the state legislature. She has chaired the Ethics and Guidance, Higher Education, and Social Services committees during her tenure. She unsuccessfully sought the Democratic nomination for borough president of Manhattan in 1997.

== Early life ==
Deborah J. Glick was born in the New York City borough of Queens, on December 24, 1950. She graduated from Queens College with a bachelor's degree and from Fordham University with a Master of Business Administration. She has lived in Greenwich Village for over 40 years. She is Jewish and is married to Leslie.

Until May 1990, Glick was a deputy director for the New York City Department of Housing Preservation and Development. Prior to that she operated a printing business in Tribeca.

Glick announced in October 2025 that she will retire from the New York State Assembly in January 2027.

== Career ==
=== Local politics ===
Greenwich Village's Democratic politics were divided into the pro-Ed Koch Village Reform Democratic Club (VRDC), anti-Koch Village Independent Democrats (VID), and neutral Downtown Independent Democrats (DID). The Gay and Lesbian Independent Democrats elected Glick, who was opposed to Koch, president in 1986. The pro-Koch members of the organization left and formed the Stonewall Democratic Club.

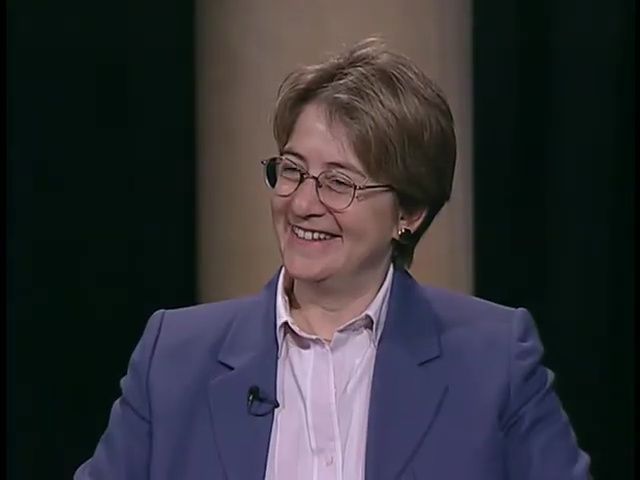
Glick on CUNY TV's The Urban Agenda, 2001

Ruth Messinger, borough president of Manhattan, ran for mayor of New York City in 1997, rather than for reelection. Glick announced her campaign for the Democratic nomination on May 4, but lost to C. Virginia Fields. Her campaign raised $665,002 from donors and received $322,074 in public funds. Fields was endorsed by Messinger while Glick was endorsed by Alan Hevesi.

Thomas Duane was endorsed by Glick for New York City Council in 1991, later becoming its first openly gay member. She and other gay leaders and organizations opposed the reelection of Antonio Pagán, a gay man, to the city council in 1993. For mayor of New York City, she supported Fernando Ferrer in 2005, Bill Thompson in 2009, Maya Wiley in 2021, and Scott Stringer in 2025. Glick called for Eric Adams to resign as Mayor of New York City after he was indicted.

=== State legislature ===
==== Elections ====
William F. Passannante, who had served in the state legislature for 35 years, announced that he would not seek reelection to the New York State Assembly from the 61st district on April 11, 1990. Glick, who launched her campaign before his announcement, was supported by Susan Sarandon, Messinger, Bella Abzug, the National Organization for Women, and The New York Times.

Liz Shollenberger, who was endorsed by the Stonewall Democratic Club and VRDC, attacked Glick's commitment to abortion stating that "The only time that a lesbian would deal with an abortion would be when she's raped." The VID endorsed Tony Hoffman while DID endorsed Kathryn E. Freed. She defeated Republican nominee Elizabeth Ivory Greene in the general election. Around $150,000 was spent by Glick during the campaign.

Glick faced no opposition in the 2006, 2008, 2012, and 2022 elections. She considered running to succeed Manfred Ohrenstein in the New York State Senate in 1994, but declined to do so.

Doug Seidman was selected by the Working Families Party as a paper candidate against Glick in 2018. The WFP swapped Seidman for Cynthia Nixon, who received the party's gubernatorial nomination and is a resident of the district, so that it could give its nomination to Andrew Cuomo. Nixon did not campaign and supported Glick. Glick won with 81.94% of the vote. On October 22, 2025, Glick announced that she would not seek reelection.

==== Tenure ====
Glick was the first openly LGBT person in the state legislature. She refused to participate in the 1992 New York City St. Patrick's Day Parade if the Irish Lesbian and Gay Organization were prohibited.

In 1991, Glick was the 10th-lowest paid member of the state legislature. During Glick's tenure in the state house she served on the Children and Families, Environmental Conservation, Government Operations, Rules, and Ways and Means committees. She was chair of the Ethics and Guidance, Higher Education, and Social Services committees. She was a presidential elector for Bill Clinton in the 1996 election.

== Political positions ==
In 1993, legislation cosponsored by Glick which would amend New York's civil rights law to prohibit discrimination based on sexual orientation was passed by the state house, but was not voted on in the state senate. Pope John Paul II's visit to the United States was protested by around 1,000 people, including Glick, due to his stances on abortion, birth control, and gay rights. She criticized Barack Obama for selecting Rick Warren to do the invocation at his inauguration due to his stances on gay rights. In 2013, she supported legislation to ban conversion therapy.

Legislation to recognize domestic partnerships was proposed by Glick. She supported repealing New York misdemeanor punishment for adultery, which ad existed since the 1800s, as only 10 people were arrested for it between 1972 and 1993. She criticized Senate Majority Leader Joseph Bruno in 1995, after he stated that LGBT state senate employees should not receive health coverage for domestic partners as it would subsidize their "abnormal lifestyle".

Glick opposes capital punishment. In 1991, Glick sponsored legislation by Velmanette Montgomery that would decriminalize the possession of hypodermic needle, hoping that the availability of clean needles would reduce the spread of HIV/AIDS. In 1995, the state assembly voted 140 to 9, with Glick against, to pass Megan's Law. She supported releasing Judith Alice Clark from prison.

New York State Senator Carl Marcellino and Glick proposed legislation in 2005, to ban contests where the goal is to kill as many animals as possible, with the exception of fishing contests. Similar legislation was cosponsored by Glick and signed into law by Governor Kathy Hochul in 2023. Selling horses for meat was made illegal by legislation sponsored by Glick in 2023.

The 1992 redistricting plan for the state legislature was criticized by Glick as a "clear attempt to gerrymander". In 2017, she proposed to create a compulsory voting system with a fine of $10 for those who do not vote.

Construction of a new stadium for the New York Jets in Manhattan was opposed by Glick in 2005. She opposed using Pier 40 for residential development and the Elizabeth Street Garden for affordable housing for seniors in the mid 2020s.

On June 22, 2026, Glick appeared at the Lesbian, Gay, BiSexual, Transgender Community Center of New York to denounce the 2026 Republican nominee for Governor of New York Bruce Blakeman for his anti-LGBTQ+ record and association with Andy Ogles, Randy Fine, and the Make America Great Again movement. Others who spoke at the conference were Christine C. Quinn, Ritchie Torres, the President of The Stonewall Democratic Club of New York John Wahlmeirer, and Carl Michael Wilson.

== Electoral history ==
Electoral history of Kevin Kiley
Year	Office	Party	Primary			General			Result	Ref.
Year	Office	Party	Total	%	P.	Total	%	P.	Result	Ref.
1996	New York State Assembly (66th)	Democratic; Liberal				37,338	86.26%	1st	Won	
1996	Borough president of Manhattan	Democratic	37,388	29.98%	2nd	Lost nomination			Lost	
1998	New York State Assembly (66th)	Democratic				31,095	88.39%	1st	Won	
2000	New York State Assembly (66th)	Democratic; Working Families				44,063	84.32%	1st	Won	
2002	New York State Assembly (66th)	Democratic; Working Families				26,427	85.98%	1st	Won	
2004	New York State Assembly (66th)	Democratic; Working Families				50,326	97.59%	1st	Won	
2006	New York State Assembly (66th)	Democratic; Working Families				33,667	100.00%	1st	Won	
2008	New York State Assembly (66th)	Democratic; Working Families				49,943	99.99%	1st	Won	
2010	New York State Assembly (66th)	Democratic; Working Families				28,774	86.60%	1st	Won	
2012	New York State Assembly (66th)	Democratic; Working Families				40,142	99.74%	1st	Won	
2014	New York State Assembly (66th)	Democratic				16,817	79.68%	1st	Won	
2016	New York State Assembly (66th)	Democratic; Working Families	3,383	80.20%	1st	50,531	99.23%	1st	Won	
2018	New York State Assembly (66th)	Democratic				37,419	81.94%	1st	Won	
2020	New York State Assembly (66th)	Democratic				47,688	84.87%	1st	Won	
2022	New York State Assembly (66th)	Democratic; Working Families				37,666	99.11%	1st	Won	

== See also ==
- List of first openly LGBTQ politicians in the United States

== Works cited ==
=== Books ===
- Hertzog, Mark (1996). The Lavender Vote: Lesbians, Gay Men, and Bisexuals in American Electoral Politics. New York University Press. ISBN 0814735290.
- Michaels, Ian, ed. (1998). A Decade of Reform: 1988-1998 (PDF). New York City Campaign Finance Board. Archived (PDF) from the original on March 18, 2025.
- Neiles, Edward, ed. (2013). New York Red Book (104 ed.). New York Legal Publishing. ISBN 978-1-223-06625-7.
- Ryan-Germani, Mary, ed. (2003). New York Red Book (97 ed.). New York Legal Publishing. ISBN 978-1-223-06625-7.

=== Election reports ===
- "1996 State Assembly District 66 election". New York State Board of Elections.
- "1997 Annual Report of the Board of Elections". New York City Board of Elections.
- "1998 State Assembly District 66 election". New York State Board of Elections.
- "2000 State Assembly District 66 election". New York State Board of Elections.
- "2002 State Assembly District 66 election". New York State Board of Elections.
- "2004 State Assembly District 66 election". New York State Board of Elections.
- "2006 State Assembly District 66 election". New York State Board of Elections.
- "2008 State Assembly District 66 election". New York State Board of Elections.
- "2010 State Assembly District 66 election". New York State Board of Elections.
- "2012 State Assembly District 66 election". New York State Board of Elections.
- "2014 State Assembly District 66 election". New York State Board of Elections.
- "2016 State Assembly District 66 election". New York State Board of Elections.
- "2016 State Assembly District 66 primary". New York State Board of Elections.
- "2018 State Assembly District 66 election". New York State Board of Elections.
- "2020 State Assembly District 66 election". New York State Board of Elections.
- "2022 State Assembly District 66 election". New York State Board of Elections.

=== News ===
- "The Candidates 2022: Deborah Glick for Assembly District 66". Tribeca Citizen. June 10, 2022. Archived from the original on March 16, 2025.
- Campbell, Jon (October 22, 2025). "Deborah Glick, longtime NY assemblymember from Greenwich Village, won't seek re-election". Gothamist. Archived from the original on October 25, 2025.
- Coltin, Jeff (June 16, 2021). "The endorsements for NYC mayoral candidates". City & State. Archived from the original on March 19, 2025.
- Fink, Zach (October 11, 2018). "Cynthia Nixon's Exit from Governor's Race Has Led to a Complicated Ballot in Manhattan — and a Frustrated Incumbent". NY1. Archived from the original on March 19, 2025.
- Foderaro, Lisa (March 1, 2013). "Battle for the Soul of a Park". The New York Times. Archived from the original on April 11, 2021.
- McDonough, Annie (March 17, 2025). "Endorsements in the 2025 New York City mayoral race". City & State. Archived from the original on March 19, 2025.
- Tracy, Matt (September 26, 2024). "LGBTQ lawmakers call on Mayor Adams to resign after federal indictment". Gay City News. Archived from the original on March 16, 2025.

=== Newspapers ===
- "After 36 Years, He Makes Room for New Face". Newsday. July 5, 1990. p. 19 – via Newspapers.com.
- "Assembly OKs death penalty". Daily Sentinel. April 14, 1994. p. 12 – via Newspapers.com.
- "Draws Nigh". Newsday. September 10, 1990. p. 27 – via Newspapers.com.
- "Electoral College expected to get the last word: Clinton". Tarrytown Daily News. December 16, 1996. p. 4B – via Newspapers.com.
- "First openly gay legislator elected to state Assembly". Democrat and Chronicle. November 7, 1990. p. 4A – via Newspapers.com.
- "Gay candidate announces that he has the AIDS virus". The Journal News. August 8, 1991. p. B6 – via Newspapers.com.
- "Getting Into The Political Act". New York Daily News. July 5, 1990. p. 6 – via Newspapers.com.
- "Law: Addresses of high-risk offenders made known". Poughkeepsie Journal. January 31, 1998. p. 2A – via Newspapers.com.
- "Lawmakers propose legalizing possession of hypodermic needles". The Journal News. June 28, 1991. p. B8 – via Newspapers.com.
- "Megan's Law". Newsday. June 29, 1995. p. A6 – via Newspapers.com.
- "Most, least paid lawmakers". Daily Sentinel. October 26, 1992. p. 7 – via Newspapers.com.
- "Multiple Democratic candidates would suit GOP best". The Buffalo News. July 31, 2018. p. A5 – via Newspapers.com.
- "Protesters rally near St. Pat's". New York Daily News. October 8, 1995. p. 4 – via Newspapers.com.
- "Public & private". Newsday. May 3, 1994. p. A28 – via Newspapers.com.
- "Pugilist Pols". New York Daily News. April 1, 1990. p. 6 – via Newspapers.com.
- "Senate GOP Rejects Bill on Gay Rights". The Post-Standard. July 3, 1993. p. B4 – via Newspapers.com.
- "Sex Symbols". New York Daily News. September 6, 1990. p. 6 – via Newspapers.com.
- "The Gay Pol on Homosexuals' Hit List". Newsday. August 25, 1993. p. 84 – via Newspapers.com.
- "Unhappy Days". Newsday. June 21, 1992. p. 35 – via Newspapers.com.
- Bauder, David (February 8, 1995). "GOP angers gay assemblywoman". The Post-Star. p. B11 – via Newspapers.com.
- Beer, Beth (May 2, 2003). "Downstate lawmakers take aim at wildlife contests". The Post-Standard. p. B2 – via Newspapers.com.
- Blain, Glenn (March 18, 2017). "Pol: Vote - or cough up $10". New York Daily News. p. 2 – via Newspapers.com.
- Bliven, Gus (June 14, 1992). "Redistrict plan is ridiculous". Syracuse Herald-Journal. p. B4 – via Newspapers.com.
- Cockfield, Errol (May 12, 2005). "Pressure on Silver to back Jets plan". Newsday. p. A22 – via Newspapers.com.
- Finnegan, Michael (July 25, 1997). "Hevesi backs Glick for beep in Dem battle". New York Daily News. p. 38 – via Newspapers.com.
- Gormley, Michael (December 15, 2023). "New state law bans sale of horses for meat". Newsday. p. A6 – via Newspapers.com.
- House, Billy (February 2, 1993). "Assembly gives approval to gay civil rights measure". The Reporter Dispatch. p. 6A – via Newspapers.com.
- House, Billy (May 4, 1993). "Bill seeks to end adultery as a misdemeanor". New York Daily News. p. 11A – via Newspapers.com.
- Hughes, Kyle (June 8, 1993). "Lawmaker: Allow vote on gay rights bill". The Ithaca Journal. p. 5A – via Newspapers.com.
- Keogh, Elizabeth (March 7, 2019). "Suit aims to save garden". New York Daily News. p. 25 – via Newspapers.com.
- Kriss, Erik (April 21, 2004). "Albany takes aim at Auburn crow hunt". The Post-Standard. p. B2 – via Newspapers.com.
- Liff, Bob (May 5, 1997). "Beep run for Glick kicks off". New York Daily News. p. 22 – via Newspapers.com.
- Lombardi, Frank (April 13, 1990). "Dems vie for Village pol's seat". New York Daily News. p. MJ2 – via Newspapers.com.
- Lombardi, Frank (January 5, 1997). "Five-way beep battle brewing". New York Daily News. p. 13 – via Newspapers.com.
- Lombardi, Frank (April 22, 1994). "Glick mulls run for Ohrenstein seat". New York Daily News. p. 22 – via Newspapers.com.
- Lovett, Kenneth (April 27, 2013). "Ban gay therapy: pol". New York Daily News. p. 10 – via Newspapers.com.
- McAuliff, Michael (December 19, 2008). "Dial it down a notch, Bam tells gays". New York Daily News. p. 41 – via Newspapers.com.
- Moreno, Sylvia (March 14, 1992). "Dinkins Won't March, Either". Newsday. p. 6 – via Newspapers.com.
- Moritz, Owen (July 9, 1990). "When the interesting names are those NOT on the ballot". New York Daily News. p. 6 – via Newspapers.com.
- Moses, Paul (June 3, 1997). "Messinger Taps Fields". Newsday. p. A23 – via Newspapers.com.
- Newfield, Jack (May 28, 1990). "They were liberal with insinuation". New York Daily News. p. 12 – via Newspapers.com.
- Precious, Tom (October 5, 2018). "Out with Nixon, in with Cuomo for Working Families Party". The Buffalo News. p. A10 – via Newspapers.com.
- Saul, Michael (May 1, 2009). "Dinkins likes Mike OK, but he's backing Thompson for mayor". New York Daily News. p. 37 – via Newspapers.com.
- Sur, Debadrita (December 26, 2023). "New law bans wildlife killing contests in NY". The Buffalo News. p. B3 – via Newspapers.com.
- Virasami, Bryan; Rayman, Graham; Janison, Dan (October 7, 2005). "Unfazed by clucking". Newsday. p. A22 – via Newspapers.com.
- Walt, Vivienne (February 12, 1992). "Council Bids to Extend Spousal Rights". Newsday. p. 21 – via Newspapers.com.
- Weiner, Mark (March 1, 1992). "Here I Am". Syracuse Herald-Journal. p. C1 – via Newspapers.com.

=== Web ===
- "Biography". New York State Assembly. Archived from the original on March 5, 2025.
- "Candidate Answers to JOLDC: Deborah Glick for NY Assembly District 66". Jim Owles Liberal Democratic Club. January 14, 2020. Archived from the original on March 20, 2025.
- "Deborah Glick". New York City Campaign Finance Board. Archived from the original on March 18, 2025.
- "Deborah Glick, New York, 1990". OutHistory. Archived from the original on March 16, 2025.
