= New York's 73rd State Assembly district =

American legislative district

Assemblymember
Alex Bores; D–Upper East Side

New York's 73rd State Assembly district is one of the 150 districts in the New York State Assembly. It has been represented by Alex Bores since 2023, succeeding Dan Quart.

== Geography ==
District 73 is located in Manhattan, comprising portions of the Upper East Side, Midtown East, Turtle Bay and Sutton Place. Notable places such as Grand Central Terminal, the Chrysler Building and the Guggenheim are within this district.

== Recent election results ==
=== 2026 ===
2026 New York State Assembly election, District 73
Party	Candidate	Votes	%
Democratic	Vanessa Aronson		
Working Families	Vanessa Aronson		
Total	Vanessa Aronson		
Write-in			
Total votes			100.0

=== 2024 ===
2024 New York State Assembly election, District 73
Party	Candidate	Votes	%
Democratic	Alex Bores	40,741	
Working Families	Alex Bores	1,811	
Total	Alex Bores (incumbent)	42,552	73.2
Republican	Awadhesh Gupta	15,414	26.6
Write-in		90	0.2
Total votes		58,056	100.0
Democratic hold			

=== 2022 ===
2022 New York State Assembly election, District 73
Primary election
Party	Candidate	Votes	%
Democratic	Alex Bores	3,207	28.6
Democratic	Adam Roberts	2,768	24.7
Democratic	Russell Squire	2,271	20.3
Democratic	Kellie Leeson	2,225	19.9
Democratic	May Malik	712	6.3
Write-in		25	0.2
Total votes		11,208	100
General election
Democratic	Alex Bores	31,190	
Working Families	Alex Bores	1,748	
Total	Alex Bores	32,938	73.7
Republican	David Casavis	11,747	26.3
Write-in		18	0.0
Total votes		44,703	100
Democratic hold			

=== 2020 ===
2020 New York State Assembly election, District 73
Primary election
Party	Candidate	Votes	%
Democratic	Dan Quart (incumbent)	8,672	65.9
Democratic	Cameron Koffman	4,427	33.7
Write-in		49	0.4
Total votes		13,148	100
General election
Democratic	Dan Quart	42,526	
Working Families	Dan Quart	2,670	
Total	Dan Quart (incumbent)	45,196	74.3
Republican	Judith Graham	15,534	25.5
Write-in		93	0.2
Total votes		60,823	100
Democratic hold			

=== 2018 ===
2018 New York State Assembly election, District 73
Primary election
Party	Candidate	Votes	%
Independence	Jeff Ascherman	20	60.6
Write-in		13	39.4
Total votes		33	100
General election
Democratic	Dan Quart	35,224	
Working Families	Dan Quart	957	
Total	Dan Quart (incumbent)	36,181	76.1
Republican	Jeff Ascherman	10,618	
Independence	Jeff Ascherman	616	
Reform	Jeff Ascherman	86	
Total	Jeff Ascherman	11,320	23.8
Write-in		37	0.1
Total votes		47,538	100
Democratic hold			

=== 2016 ===
2016 New York State Assembly election, District 73
Primary election
Party	Candidate	Votes	%
Women's Equality	Rebecca Harary	3	100
Write-in		0	0.0
Total votes		3	100
General election
Democratic	Dan Quart	34,696	
Working Families	Dan Quart	840	
Total	Dan Quart (incumbent)	35,536	62.7
Republican	Rebecca Harary	18,473	
Independence	Rebecca Harary	775	
Stop De Blasio	Rebecca Harary	615	
Libertarian	Rebecca Harary	325	
Women's Equality	Rebecca Harary	267	
Reform	Rebecca Harary	82	
Total	Rebecca Harary	20,537	36.2
Green	Donal Butterfield	584	1.0
Write-in		40	0.1
Total votes		56,697	100
Democratic hold			

=== 2014 ===
2014 New York State Assembly election, District 73
Primary election
Party	Candidate	Votes	%
Green	Donal Butterfield	4	80.0
Green	David Casavis	1	20.0
Write-in		0	0.0
Total votes		5	100
General election
Democratic	Dan Quart	15,135	
Working Families	Dan Quart	1,483	
Total	Dan Quart (incumbent)	16,618	67.6
Republican	David Casavis	7,179	
Independence	David Casavis	328	
Total	David Casavis	7,507	30.5
Green	Donal Butterfield	454	1.8
Write-in		18	0.1
Total votes		24,597	100
Democratic hold			

=== 2012 ===
2012 New York State Assembly election, District 73
Party	Candidate	Votes	%
Democratic	Dan Quart	31,336	
Working Families	Dan Quart	817	
Total	Dan Quart (incumbent)	32,153	68.9
Republican	David Casavis	13,721	
Independence	David Casavis	493	
Libertarian	David Casavis	289	
Total	David Casavis	14,503	31.2
Write-in		15	0.2
Total votes		46,671	100.0
Democratic hold			

=== 2011 special ===
2011 New York State Assembly special election, District 73
Party	Candidate	Votes	%
Democratic	Dan Quart	6,020	
Working Families	Dan Quart	298	
Total	Dan Quart	6,318	66.8
Republican	Paul Niehaus	2,802	
Independence	Paul Niehaus	327	
Total	Paul Niehaus	3,129	33.1
Write-in		11	0.1
Total votes		9,458	100.0
Democratic hold			
